= New Mexico's 3rd congressional district =

U.S. House district for New Mexico

Coordinates: 36°00′35″N 105°49′55″W

- Interactive map of district boundaries since January 3, 2023
- Representative: Teresa Leger Fernández; D–Santa Fe
- Distribution: 64.70% urban; 35.30% rural
- Population (2025): 698,155
- Median household income: $66,719
- Ethnicity: 42.4% Hispanic; 34.5% White; 17.6% Native American; 2.6% Two or more races; 1.2% Black; 1.2% Asian; 0.5% other
- Cook PVI: D+3

New Mexico's 3rd congressional district serves the northern half of New Mexico, including the state's Capital, Santa Fe. The district has a significant Native American presence, encompassing most of the New Mexico portion of the Navajo Nation, situated in the northwest corner of the state, and most of the Puebloan peoples reservations. The current Representative is Democrat Teresa Leger Fernandez.

Ever since Mary Peltola of Alaska's at-large congressional district lost re-election in 2024, this district has been the largest United States congressional district by land area to be represented by a Democrat.

== History ==
The district was created as a result of the redistricting cycle after the 1980 census. Ben Ray Luján, who was elected to the seat in 2008, ran successfully for the United States Senate in 2020, leaving the seat open. Democratic nominee Teresa Leger Fernandez defeated Republican Alexis Johnson in the 2020 general election.

=== Historical district boundaries ===
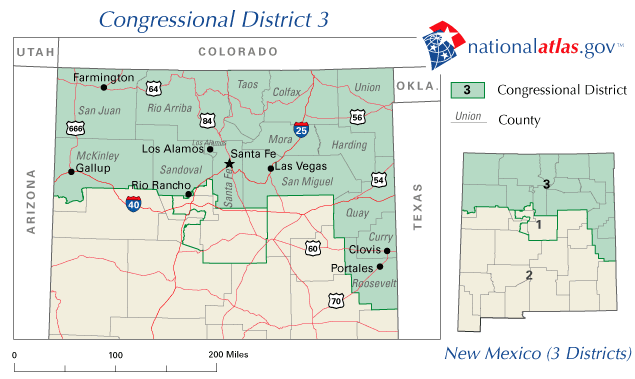
2003–2013

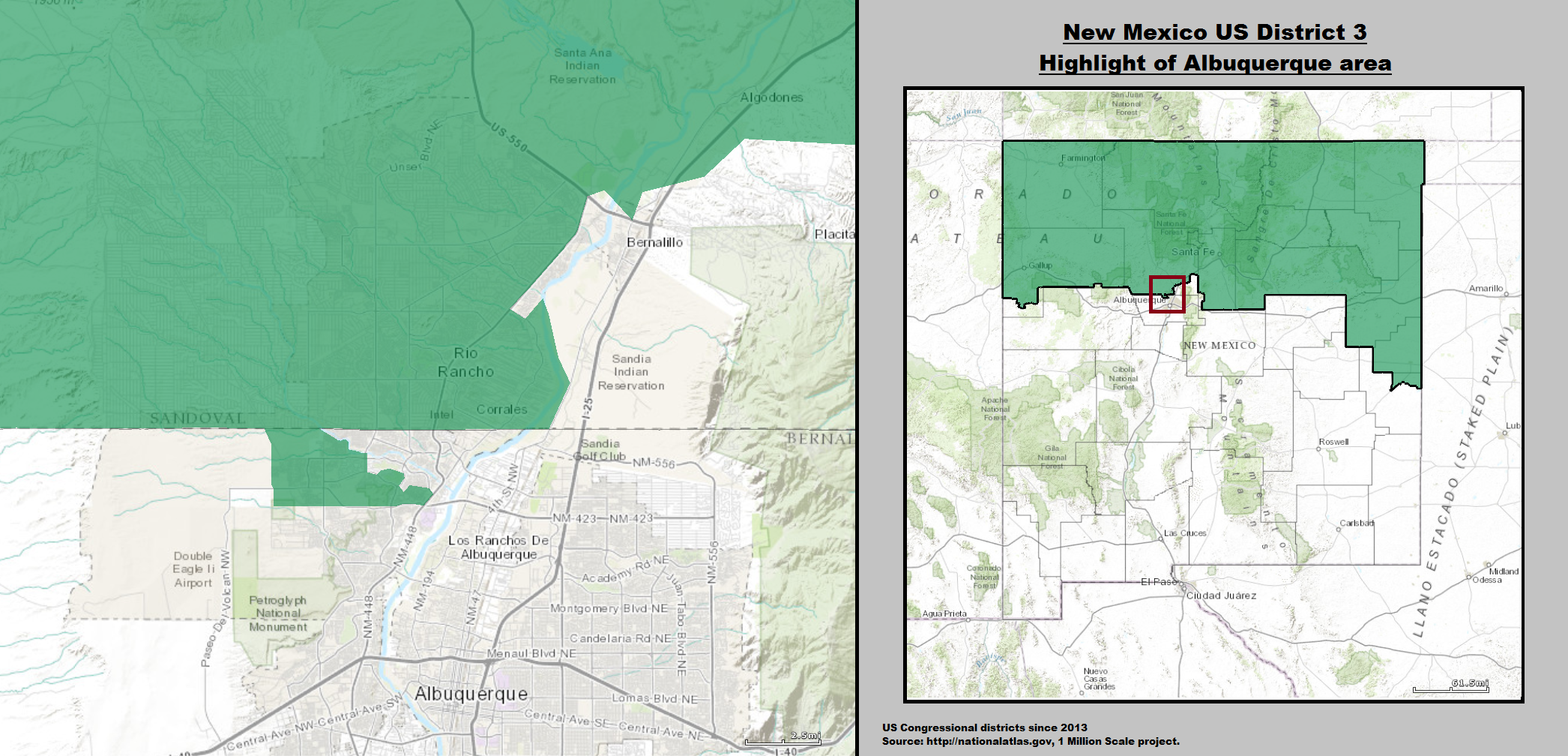
2013–2023

== Recent election results from statewide races ==
Year	Office	Results
2008	President	Obama 56–42%
2008	Senate	Udall 64–36%
2010	Governor	Martinez 50.4–49.6%
2010	Secretary of State	Duran 56–44%
2010	Attorney General	King 57–43%
2010	Auditor	Balderas 58–42%
2010	Treasurer	Lewis 57–43%
2012	President	Obama 57–43%
2012	Senate	Heinrich 52–44%
2014	Senate	Udall 60–40%
2014	Governor	Martinez 53–47%
2014	Secretary of State	Duran 50.3–49.7%
2014	Attorney General	Balderas 61–39%
2014	Auditor	Keller 56–44%
2014	Treasurer	Eichenberg 55–45%
2016	President	Clinton 50–39%
2016	Secretary of State (Spec.)	Toulouse Oliver 57–43%
2018	Senate	Heinrich 56–30%
2018	Governor	Lujan Grisham 59–41%
2018	Attorney General	Balderas 62–33%
2018	Auditor	Colón 59–41%
2020	President	Biden 54–44%
2020	Senate	Luján 53–45%
2022	Governor	Lujan Grisham 54–44%
2022	Secretary of State	Toulouse Oliver 55–42%
2022	Attorney General	Torrez 57–43%
2022	Treasurer	L. Montoya 55–45%
2024	President	Harris 52–46%
2024	Senate	Heinrich 55–45%

== Composition ==
For the 118th and successive Congresses (based on redistricting following the 2020 census), the district contains all or portions of the following counties and communities:

Colfax County (7)

All 7 communities

Chaves County (5)

Dexter, Hagerman, Lake Arthur, Midway, Roswell (part; also 1st)

Curry County (5)

All 5 communities

Eddy County (3)

Artesia, Atoka (part; also 2nd), Morningside

Harding County (2)

Mosquero (shared with San Miguel County), Roy

Lea County (4)

Hobbs (part; also 2nd), Lovington, North Hobbs, Tatum

Los Alamos County (2)

Los Alamos, White Rock

McKinley County (41)

Becenti, Black Hat, Black Rock, Bluewater, Borrego Pass, Brimhall Nizhoni, Catalpa Canyon, Church Rock, Continental Divide, Crestview, Crownpoint, Crystal (shared with San Juan County), Fort Wingate, Gallup, Gamerco, Haystack, Homer C Jones, Iyanbito, Jamestown, Manuelito, McGaffey, Nakaibito, Navajo, Ojo Encino, Pinedale, Pinehaven, Prewitt, Pueblo Pintado, Purty Rock, Red Rock Ranch, Rock Springs, Sagar, Sundance, Thoreau, Tohatchi, Tse Bonito, Twin Lakes, Vanderwagen, White Cliffs, Williams Acres, Yah-ta-hey

Mora County (3)

All 3 communities

Quay County (5)

All 5 communities

Rio Arriba County (41)

All 41 communities

Roosevelt County (5)

All 5 communities

Sandoval County (21)

Algodones, Cañon, Cochiti, Cochiti Lake, Cuba, Jemez Pueblo, Jemez Springs, La Cueva, La Jara, Peña Blanca, Ponderosa, Regina, Rio Rancho (part; also 1st), Rio Rancho Estates (part; also 1st), San Felipe Pueblo, San Luis, Santa Ana Pueblo, Santo Domingo Pueblo, San Ysidro, Torreon, Zia Pueblo

San Juan County (35)

All 35 communities

San Miguel County (15)

All 15 communities

Santa Fe County (51)

Agua Fria, Arroyo Hondo, Cañada de los Alimos, Chimayo (shared with Rio Arriba County), Cedar Grove (part; also 1st), Chupadero, Conejo, Cuartelez, Cundiyo, Cuyamungue, Cuyamungue Grant, Eldorado at Santa Fe, El Rancho, El Valle de Arroyo Seco, Encantado, Española, Galisteo, Glorieta, Golden, Hyde Park, Jacona, Jaconita, La Bajada, La Cienega, La Cueva, Lamy, La Puebla, Las Campanas, La Tierra, Los Cerrillos, Madrid, Nambé, Peak Place, Pojoaque, Rio Chiquito, Rio en Medio, San Ildefonso Pueblo, San Pedro (part; also 1st), Santa Cruz, Santa Fe, Santa Fe Foothills, Seton Village, Sombrillo, Stanley, Sunlit Hills, Tano Road, Tesuque, Tesuque Pueblo, Tres Arroyos, Valencia, Valle Vista

Taos County (17)

All 15 communities

Union County (5)

All 5 communities

== List of members representing the district ==
Member (District home)	Party	Years	Cong ress	Electoral history	District boundaries
District established January 3, 1983
Bill Richardson (Santa Fe)	Democratic	January 3, 1983 – February 13, 1997	98th 99th 100th 101st 102nd 103rd 104th 105th	Elected in 1982. Re-elected in 1984. Re-elected in 1986. Re-elected in 1988. Re-elected in 1990. Re-elected in 1992. Re-elected in 1994. Re-elected in 1996. Resigned to become U.S. Ambassador to the United Nations.	1983–1993; Catron, Cibola, Colfax, Harding, Los Alamos, McKinley, Mora, Rio Arriba, Sandoval, San Juan, San Miguel, Santa Fe, Socorro, Taos, and Valencia
Bill Richardson (Santa Fe)	Democratic	January 3, 1983 – February 13, 1997	98th 99th 100th 101st 102nd 103rd 104th 105th	Elected in 1982. Re-elected in 1984. Re-elected in 1986. Re-elected in 1988. Re-elected in 1990. Re-elected in 1992. Re-elected in 1994. Re-elected in 1996. Resigned to become U.S. Ambassador to the United Nations.	1993–2003; Colfax, Curry, Harding, Los Alamos, McKinley, Mora, Quay, Rio Arriba, Roosevelt, San Juan, San Miguel, Taos, and Union; parts of Bernalillo, Cibola, Sandoval, and Santa Fe
Vacant		February 13, 1997 – May 13, 1997	105th		1993–2003; Colfax, Curry, Harding, Los Alamos, McKinley, Mora, Quay, Rio Arriba, Roosevelt, San Juan, San Miguel, Taos, and Union; parts of Bernalillo, Cibola, Sandoval, and Santa Fe
Bill Redmond (Santa Fe)	Republican	May 13, 1997 – January 3, 1999	105th	Elected to finish Richardson's term. Lost re-election.	1993–2003; Colfax, Curry, Harding, Los Alamos, McKinley, Mora, Quay, Rio Arriba, Roosevelt, San Juan, San Miguel, Taos, and Union; parts of Bernalillo, Cibola, Sandoval, and Santa Fe
Tom Udall (Santa Fe)	Democratic	January 3, 1999 – January 3, 2009	106th 107th 108th 109th 110th	Elected in 1998. Re-elected in 2000. Re-elected in 2002. Re-elected in 2004. Re-elected in 2006. Retired to run for U.S. senator.	1993–2003; Colfax, Curry, Harding, Los Alamos, McKinley, Mora, Quay, Rio Arriba, Roosevelt, San Juan, San Miguel, Taos, and Union; parts of Bernalillo, Cibola, Sandoval, and Santa Fe
Tom Udall (Santa Fe)	Democratic	January 3, 1999 – January 3, 2009	106th 107th 108th 109th 110th	Elected in 1998. Re-elected in 2000. Re-elected in 2002. Re-elected in 2004. Re-elected in 2006. Retired to run for U.S. senator.	2003–2013 Colfax, Curry, Harding, Los Alamos, Mora, Quay, Rio Arriba, Roosevelt, San Juan, San Miguel, Santa Fe, Taos, and Union; parts of Bernalillo, McKinley, Sandoval, and Santa Fe
Ben Ray Luján (Nambé)	Democratic	January 3, 2009 – January 3, 2021	111th 112th 113th 114th 115th 116th	Elected in 2008. Re-elected in 2010. Re-elected in 2012. Re-elected in 2014. Re-elected in 2016. Re-elected in 2018. Retired to run for U.S. senator.	2003–2013 Colfax, Curry, Harding, Los Alamos, Mora, Quay, Rio Arriba, Roosevelt, San Juan, San Miguel, Santa Fe, Taos, and Union; parts of Bernalillo, McKinley, Sandoval, and Santa Fe
Ben Ray Luján (Nambé)	Democratic	January 3, 2009 – January 3, 2021	111th 112th 113th 114th 115th 116th	Elected in 2008. Re-elected in 2010. Re-elected in 2012. Re-elected in 2014. Re-elected in 2016. Re-elected in 2018. Retired to run for U.S. senator.	2013–2023 Colfax, Curry, Harding, Los Alamos, Mora, Quay, Rio Arriba, San Juan, San Miguel, Taos, and Union; parts of Bernalillo, McKinley, Roosevelt, Sandoval, and Santa Fe
Teresa Leger Fernández (Santa Fe)	Democratic	January 3, 2021 – present	117th 118th 119th	Elected in 2020. Re-elected in 2022. Re-elected in 2024. Re-elected in 2026.	2013–2023 Colfax, Curry, Harding, Los Alamos, Mora, Quay, Rio Arriba, San Juan, San Miguel, Taos, and Union; parts of Bernalillo, McKinley, Roosevelt, Sandoval, and Santa Fe
Teresa Leger Fernández (Santa Fe)	Democratic	January 3, 2021 – present	117th 118th 119th	Elected in 2020. Re-elected in 2022. Re-elected in 2024. Re-elected in 2026.	2023–present Colfax, Curry, Harding, Los Alamos, Mora, Quay, Rio Arriba, Roosevelt, San Juan, San Miguel, Taos, and Union; parts of Chaves, Eddy, Lea, McKinley, Sandoval, and Santa Fe

== Election results ==
=== 1982 ===
1982 United States House of Representatives elections in New Mexico: District 3
Party	Candidate	Votes	%
Democratic	Bill Richardson	84,669	64.49
Republican	Marjorie Bell Chambers	46,466	35.39
Write-in		158	0.12
Total votes		131,293	100.00
Democratic win (new seat)			

=== 1984 ===
1984 United States House of Representatives elections in New Mexico: District 3
Party	Candidate	Votes	%
Democratic	Bill Richardson (incumbent)	100,470	60.81
Republican	Louis H. Gallegos	62,351	37.74
Libertarian	Shirley Machocky Jones	2,388	1.45
Total votes		165,209	100.00
Democratic hold			

=== 1986 ===
1986 United States House of Representatives elections in New Mexico: District 3
Party	Candidate	Votes	%
Democratic	Bill Richardson (incumbent)	95,760	71.30
Republican	David F. Cargo	38,552	28.70
Total votes		134,312	100.00
Democratic hold			

=== 1988 ===
1988 United States House of Representatives elections in New Mexico: District 3
Party	Candidate	Votes	%
Democratic	Bill Richardson (incumbent)	124,938	73.11
Republican	Cecilia M. Salazar	45,954	26.89
Total votes		170,892	100.00
Democratic hold			

=== 1990 ===
1990 United States House of Representatives elections in New Mexico: District 3
Party	Candidate	Votes	%
Democratic	Bill Richardson (incumbent)	104,225	74.46
Republican	Phil T. Archuletta	35,751	25.54
Total votes		139,976	100.00
Democratic hold			

=== 1992 ===
1992 United States House of Representatives elections in New Mexico: District 3
Party	Candidate	Votes	%
Democratic	Bill Richardson (incumbent)	122,850	67.42
Republican	F. Gregg Bemis Jr.	54,569	29.95
Libertarian	Ed Nagel	4,798	2.63
Total votes		182,217	100.00
Democratic hold			

=== 1994 ===
1994 United States House of Representatives elections in New Mexico: District 3
Party	Candidate	Votes	%
Democratic	Bill Richardson (incumbent)	99,900	63.59
Republican	F. Gregg Bemis Jr.	53,515	34.06
Libertarian	Ed Nagel	3,697	2.35
Total votes		157,112	100.00
Democratic hold			

=== 1996 ===
1996 United States House of Representatives elections in New Mexico: District 3
Party	Candidate	Votes	%
Democratic	Bill Richardson (incumbent)	124,594	67.25
Republican	Bill Redmond	56,580	30.54
Libertarian	Ed Nagel	4,097	2.21
Total votes		185,271	100.00
Democratic hold			

=== 1997 (Special) ===
1997 New Mexico's 3rd congressional district special election
Party	Candidate	Votes	%
Republican	Bill Redmond	43,559	42.75
Democratic	Eric P. Serna	40,542	39.79
Green	Carol Miller	17,101	16.78
Libertarian	Ed Nagel	393	0.39
Reform	Daniel Pearlman	304	0.30
Total votes		101,899	100.00
Republican gain from Democratic			

=== 1998 ===
1998 United States House of Representatives elections in New Mexico: District 3
Party	Candidate	Votes	%
Democratic	Tom Udall	91,248	53.16
Republican	Bill Redmond (incumbent)	74,266	43.27
Green	Carol Miller	6,103	3.56
Write-in		32	0.01
Total votes		171,649	100.00
Democratic gain from Republican			

=== 2000 ===
2000 United States House of Representatives elections in New Mexico: District 3
Party	Candidate	Votes	%
Democratic	Tom Udall (incumbent)	135,040	67.18
Republican	Lisa L. Lutz	65,979	32.82
Total votes		201,019	100.00
Democratic hold			

=== 2002 ===
2002 United States House of Representatives elections in New Mexico: District 3
Party	Candidate	Votes	%
Democratic	Tom Udall (incumbent)	122,921	100.00
Total votes		122,921	100.00
Democratic hold			

=== 2004 ===
2004 United States House of Representatives elections in New Mexico: District 3
Party	Candidate	Votes	%
Democratic	Tom Udall (incumbent)	175,269	68.68
Republican	Gregory M. Tucker	79,935	31.32
Total votes		255,204	100.00
Democratic hold			

=== 2006 ===
2006 United States House of Representatives elections in New Mexico: District 3
Party	Candidate	Votes	%
Democratic	Tom Udall (incumbent)	144,880	74.64
Republican	Ronald M. Dolin	49,219	25.36
Total votes		194,099	100.00
Democratic hold			

=== 2008 ===
2008 Democratic Primary Congressional Election, District 3
Party	Candidate	Votes	%
Democratic	Ben Ray Luján	26,667	41.58
Democratic	Don Wiviott	16,314	25.44
Democratic	Benny J. Shendo Jr.	10,113	15.77
Democratic	Harry Montoya	7,205	11.23
Democratic	Jon Adams	1,993	3.11
Democratic	Rudy Martin	1,838	2.87

2008 Republican Primary Congressional Election, District 3
Party	Candidate	Votes	%
Republican	Daniel K. East	14,767	53.89
Republican	Marco Gonzales	12,634	46.11

2008 United States House of Representatives elections in New Mexico: District 3
Party	Candidate	Votes	%
Democratic	Ben Ray Luján	161,292	56.74
Republican	Daniel K. East	86,618	30.47
Independent	Carol Miller	36,348	12.79
Total votes		284,258	100.00
Democratic hold			

=== 2010 ===
2010 United States House of Representatives elections in New Mexico: District 3
Party	Candidate	Votes	%
Democratic	Ben Ray Luján (incumbent)	120,057	56.99
Republican	Thomas E. Mullins	90,621	43.01
Total votes		210,678	100.00
Democratic hold			

=== 2012 ===
2012 United States House of Representatives elections in New Mexico: District 3
Party	Candidate	Votes	%
Democratic	Ben Ray Luján (incumbent)	167,103	63.12
Republican	Jefferson L. Byrd	97,616	36.88
Total votes		264,719	100.00
Democratic hold			

=== 2014 ===
2014 United States House of Representatives elections in New Mexico: District 3
Party	Candidate	Votes	%
Democratic	Ben Ray Luján (incumbent)	113,249	61.52
Republican	Jefferson Byrd	70,775	38.45
Republican	Thomas Hook (Write-In)	52	0.03
Total votes		184,076	100.00
Democratic hold			

=== 2016 ===
2016 United States House of Representatives elections in New Mexico: District 3
Party	Candidate	Votes	%
Democratic	Ben Ray Luján (incumbent)	170,612	62.42
Republican	Michael H. Romero	102,730	37.58
Total votes		273,342	100.00
Democratic hold			

=== 2018 ===
2018 United States House of Representatives elections in New Mexico: District 3
Party	Candidate	Votes	%
Democratic	Ben Ray Luján (incumbent)	155,201	63.4
Republican	Jerald S. McFall	76,427	31.2
Libertarian	Christopher Manning	13,265	5.4
Total votes		244,893	100.00
Democratic hold			

=== 2020 ===
2020 United States House of Representatives elections in New Mexico: District 3
Party	Candidate	Votes	%
Democratic	Teresa Leger Fernandez	186,282	58.7
Republican	Alexis Martinez Johnson	131,166	41.3
Total votes		317,448	100.00
Democratic hold			

=== 2022 ===
2022 United States House of Representatives elections in New Mexico: District 3
Party	Candidate	Votes	%
Democratic	Teresa Leger Fernandez (incumbent)	134,217	58.2
Republican	Alexis Martinez Johnson	96,565	41.8
Total votes		230,782	100.00
Democratic hold			

=== 2024 ===
2024 United States House of Representatives elections in New Mexico: District 3
Party	Candidate	Votes	%
Democratic	Teresa Leger Fernandez (incumbent)	162,342	56.3
Republican	Sharon Clahchischilliage	126,085	43.7
Total votes		288,427	100.00
Democratic hold			

== See also ==
- New Mexico's congressional districts
- List of United States congressional districts
