= New Mexico State Road 592 =

State highway in New Mexico, United States

State Road 592
- NM 592highlighted in red

Route information
- Maintained by NMDOT
- Length: 5.345 mi (8.602 km)

Major junctions
- South end: CR 73 (Tesuque Village Road) near Tesuque
- North end: End of state maintenance in Rio En Medio

Location
- Country: United States
- State: New Mexico
- Counties: Santa Fe

Highway system
- New Mexico State Highway System; Interstate; US; State; Scenic
← NM 585	→ NM 594

State Road 592 (NM 592) is a 5.345-mile-long (8.602 km) state highway in the US state of New Mexico. NM 592's southern terminus is at Santa Fe County Route 73 (CR 73) (Tesuque Village Road) (former NM 591) northwest of Tesuque, and the northern terminus is at the end of state maintenance in Rio En Medio. It travels through Encantado and Chupadero. NM 592 is not connected to any other state road in the state highway system.

== Major intersections ==
The entire route is in Santa Fe County.

Location	mi	km	Destinations	Notes
	0.000	0.000	CR 73 (Tesuque Village Road) to US 84 / US 285	Southern terminus; former routing of NM 591
Rio En Medio	5.345	8.602	End of state maintenance	Northern terminus
1.000 mi = 1.609 km; 1.000 km = 0.621 mi
