= Valle Vista =

Valle Vista may refer to the following places in the United States:

- Valle Vista, Arizona
- Valle Vista, California, in Riverside County
- Valle Vista, New Mexico
- Valle Vista, Texas
