= New Mexico State Road 594 =

State highway in New Mexico, United States

State Road 594

Route information
- Maintained by NMDOT

Location
- Country: United States
- State: New Mexico
- Counties: Santa Fe

Highway system
- New Mexico State Highway System; Interstate; US; State; Scenic
← NM 592	→ NM 595

State Road 594 (NM 594) was a state highway in the US state of New Mexico. The 2010 NMDOT Highway Log showed NM 594 having a southern terminus is at NM 599 by Santa Fe, and a northern terminus was at NM 4 by White Rock with a length of 1 mile, but the straight-line distance between the two locations is roughly 12 miles. Then the 2016 NMDOT Highway Log didn't include a NM 594 designation in the list.

== Future ==
With no Rio Grande crossing in the area, the NM 594 designation seemed to be a placeholder for a future route planned as a direct route between Santa Fe and Los Alamos.
