= Waldo, New Mexico =

- Ghost town
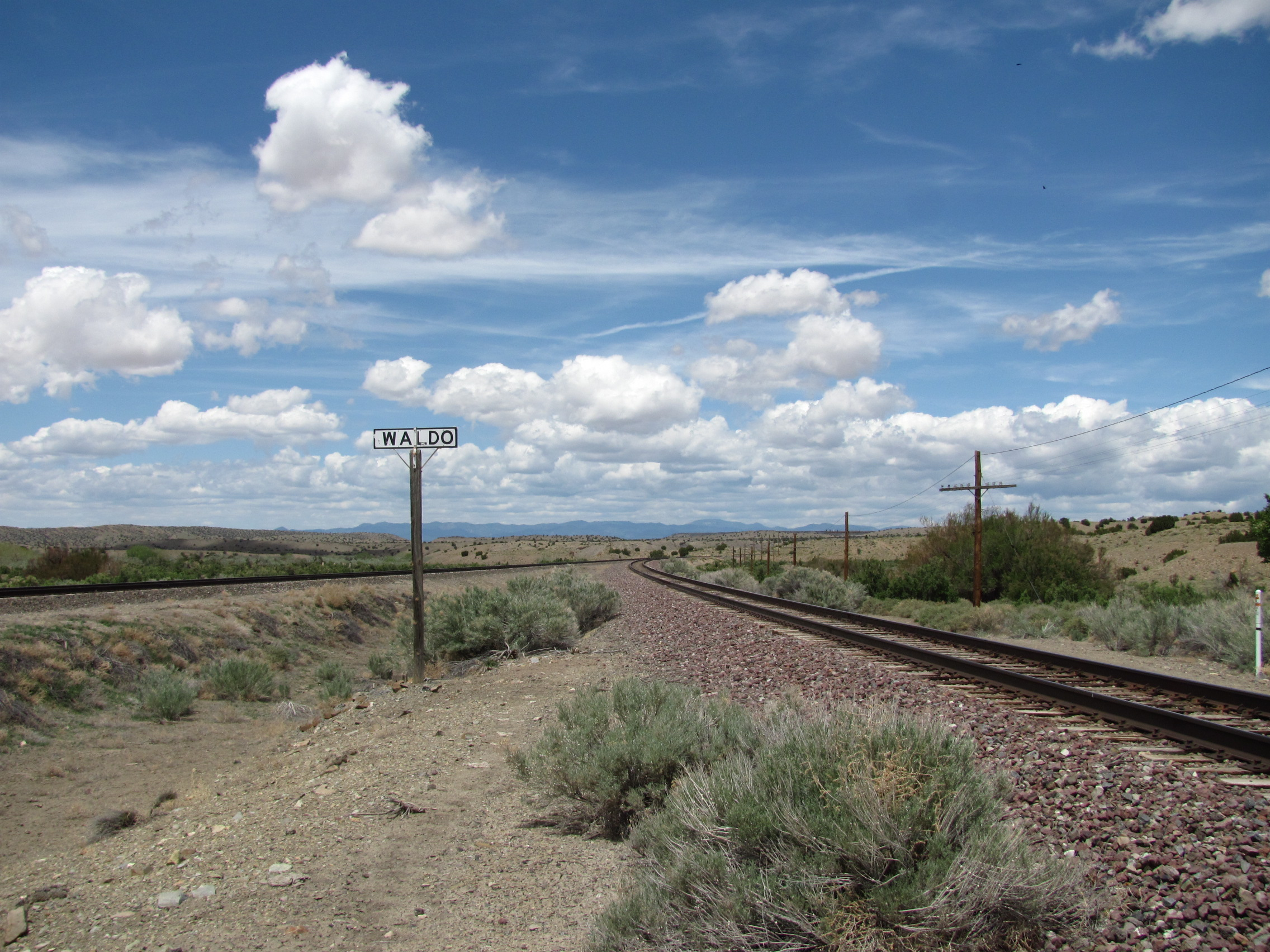
- Waldo sign along the BNSF tracks

- Location within New Mexico
- Coordinates: 35°27′02″N 106°08′52″W
- Country: United States
- State: New Mexico
- County: Santa Fe
- Elevation: 5,640 ft (1,720 m)
- Time zone: UTC-7 (Mountain (MST))
  - Summer (DST): UTC-6 (MDT)
- Area code: 505
- GNIS feature ID: 918402

Waldo is a ghost town in Santa Fe County, New Mexico, United States.

== Description ==
The community was created along the Atchison, Topeka and Santa Fe Railway just west of Cerrillos. Today little remains, although the name appears on a freeway exit on Interstate 25, some distance to the west. Today, Waldo is a siding along the line of the BNSF Railway, which is part of the former Atchison Topeka and Santa Fe Railway.

Waldo was at the junction of the AT&SF main east–west line and the Madrid spur. There were coke ovens in Waldo, supplied by coal from Madrid. The spur itself no longer exists. The ovens were on the south side of the rail line, and the town on the north. The rail line parallels the Galisteo River.
