= Encantado, New Mexico =

- Census-designated place
- Location within New Mexico Location within the United States
- Coordinates: 35°47′36″N 105°54′40″W
- Country: United States
- State: New Mexico
- County: Santa Fe

Area
  - Total: 2.68 sq mi (6.95 km^{2})
  - Land: 2.68 sq mi (6.95 km^{2})
  - Water: 0 sq mi (0.00 km^{2})
- Elevation: 7,130 ft (2,170 m)

Population (2020)
  - Total: 93
  - Density: 34.7/sq mi (13.38/km^{2})
- Time zone: UTC-7 (Mountain (MST))
  - Summer (DST): UTC-6 (MDT)
- ZIP Code: 87506 (Santa Fe)
- Area code: 505
- FIPS code: 35-24453
- GNIS feature ID: 2806759

Encantado is an unincorporated community and census-designated place (CDP) in Santa Fe County, New Mexico, United States. It was first listed as a CDP prior to the 2020 census. As of the 2020 census, Encantado had a population of 93.

The CDP is in northern Santa Fe County and is bordered to the north by Chupadero and to the west by Peak Place. New Mexico State Road 592 forms the northwest border of the CDP and leads southwest 2 miles (3 km) to U.S. Routes 84/285. Santa Fe, the state capital, is 9 miles (14 km) south of Encantado.

The Egan family operated Rancho Encantado from 1967 to 1995. It reopened as a luxury resort in 2008. Four Seasons Hotels and Resorts began managing the resort in 2012.

== Demographics ==
Historical population
Census	Pop.	Note	%±
2020	93		—
U.S. Decennial Census

== Education ==
It is within Santa Fe Public Schools.
