= Santa Fe County, New Mexico =

County in New Mexico, United States

- County
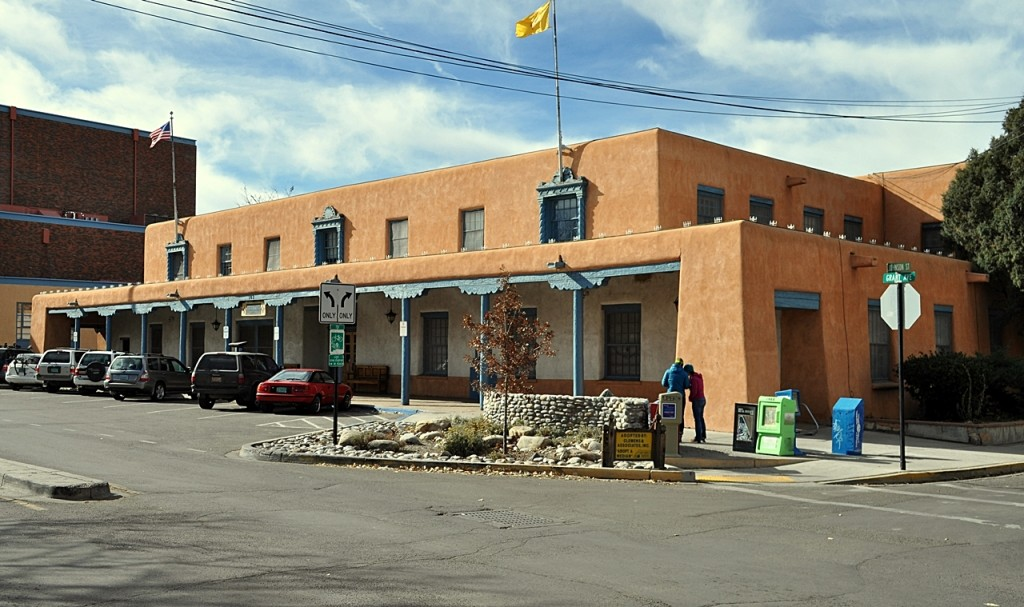
- Original Santa Fe County Courthouse

- Seal

- Location within the U.S. state of New Mexico
- Coordinates: 35°31′N 105°59′W
- Country: United States
- State: New Mexico
- Founded: 1852
- Seat: Santa Fe
- Largest city: Santa Fe

Area
  - Total: 1,911 sq mi (4,950 km^{2})
  - Land: 1,909 sq mi (4,940 km^{2})
  - Water: 1.5 sq mi (3.9 km^{2}) 0.08%

Population (2020)
  - Total: 154,823
  - Estimate (2025): 156,907 ▲
  - Density: 81.10/sq mi (31.31/km^{2})
- Time zone: UTC−7 (Mountain)
  - Summer (DST): UTC−6 (MDT)
- Congressional districts: 1st, 3rd
- Website: www.santafecountynm.gov

Santa Fe County (Spanish: Condado de Santa Fe; meaning "County of the Holy faith" in Spanish) is a county located in the U.S. state of New Mexico. As of the 2020 census, its population was 154,823, making it New Mexico's third-most populous county, after Bernalillo County and Doña Ana County. Its county seat is Santa Fe, the state capital.

Santa Fe County includes the Santa Fe metropolitan statistical area, which is also included in the Albuquerque–Santa Fe–Las Vegas combined statistical area.

== Geography ==
According to the U.S. Census Bureau, the county has a total area of 1,911 square miles (4,950 km^{2}), of which 1.5 sq mi (3.9 km^{2}) (0.08%) is covered by water. It is the fifth-smallest county in New Mexico by area. The highest point in the county is the summit of Santa Fe Baldy at 12,621 feet (3,847 m). It is drained by the Rio Grande and several of its small tributaries.

=== Adjacent counties ===
- Rio Arriba County - north
- Mora County - northeast
- San Miguel County - east
- Torrance County - south
- Bernalillo County - southwest
- Sandoval County - west
- Los Alamos County - northwest

=== National protected areas ===
- El Camino Real de Tierra Adentro National Historic Trail (part)
- Pecos National Historical Park (part)
- Santa Fe National Forest (part)

== Demographics ==
Historical population
Census	Pop.	Note	%±
1850	7,713		—
1860	8,114		5.2%
1870	9,699		19.5%
1880	10,867		12.0%
1890	13,562		24.8%
1900	14,658		8.1%
1910	14,770		0.8%
1920	15,030		1.8%
1930	19,567		30.2%
1940	30,826		57.5%
1950	38,153		23.8%
1960	44,970		17.9%
1970	53,756		19.5%
1980	75,360		40.2%
1990	98,928		31.3%
2000	129,292		30.7%
2010	144,170		11.5%
2020	154,823		7.4%
2025 (est.)	156,907	▲	1.3%
U.S. Decennial Census; 1790-1960 1900-1990; 1990-2000 2010

=== 2020 census ===
As of the 2020 census, the county had a population of 154,823. The median age was 47.9 years. 17.4% of residents were under the age of 18 and 25.7% of residents were 65 years of age or older. For every 100 females there were 93.7 males, and for every 100 females age 18 and over there were 91.8 males age 18 and over.

Santa Fe County, New Mexico – Racial and ethnic composition Note: the US Census treats Hispanic/Latino as an ethnic category. This table excludes Latinos from the racial categories and assigns them to a separate category. Hispanics/Latinos may be of any race.
Race / Ethnicity (NH = Non-Hispanic)	Pop 2000	Pop 2010	Pop 2020	% 2000	% 2010	% 2020
White alone (NH)	58,790	63,291	67,861	45.47%	43.90%	43.83%
Black or African American alone (NH)	667	947	1,221	0.52%	0.66%	0.79%
Native American or Alaska Native alone (NH)	3,218	3,271	3,869	2.49%	2.27%	2.50%
Asian alone (NH)	1,082	1,569	2,238	0.84%	1.09%	1.45%
Pacific Islander alone (NH)	71	59	72	0.05%	0.04%	0.05%
Other race alone (NH)	208	335	969	0.16%	0.23%	0.63%
Mixed race or Multiracial (NH)	1,851	1,683	4,216	1.43%	1.17%	2.72%
Hispanic or Latino (any race)	63,405	73,015	74,377	49.04%	50.64%	48.04%
Total	129,292	144,170	154,823	100.00%	100.00%	100.00%

The racial makeup of the county was 57.4% White, 0.9% Black or African American, 3.6% American Indian and Alaska Native, 1.5% Asian, 0.1% Native Hawaiian and Pacific Islander, 14.4% from some other race, and 22.0% from two or more races. Hispanic or Latino residents of any race comprised 48.0% of the population.

65.0% of residents lived in urban areas, while 35.0% lived in rural areas.

There were 68,020 households in the county, of which 22.4% had children under the age of 18 living with them and 31.2% had a female householder with no spouse or partner present. About 34.1% of all households were made up of individuals and 16.9% had someone living alone who was 65 years of age or older.

There were 76,877 housing units, of which 11.5% were vacant. Among occupied housing units, 68.9% were owner-occupied and 31.1% were renter-occupied. The homeowner vacancy rate was 1.5% and the rental vacancy rate was 7.3%.

=== 2010 census ===
As of the 2010 census, 144,170 people, 61,963 households, and 36,183 families were residing in the county. The population density was 75.5 inhabitants per square mile (29.2/km^{2}). There were 71,267 housing units at an average density of 37.3 per square mile (14.4/km^{2}). The racial makeup of the county was 67.2% White, 3.1% American Indian, 1.2% Asian, 0.9% Black or African American, 0.1% Pacific Islander, 15.1% from other races, and 3.6% from two or more races. Those of Hispanic or Latino origin made up 50.6% of the population.

The largest ancestry groups were:

- 22.4% Mexican
- 11.2% German
- 11.1% Spanish
- 10.0% English
- 8.4% Irish
- 3.6% French
- 3.2% Italian
- 2.5% Scottish
- 2.3% American
- 2.1% Scotch-Irish
- 1.8% Polish
- 1.3% Swedish
- 1.3% Russian
- 1.2% Dutch
- 1.1% Norwegian

Of the 61,963 households, 26.9% had children under 18 living with them, 42.1% were married couples living together, 11.0% had a female householder with no husband present, 41.6% were not families, and 33.7% of all households were made up of individuals. The average household size was 2.28 and the average family size was 2.94. The median age was 43.0 years.

The median income for a household in the county was $52,696 and for a family was $64,041. Males had a median income of $41,703 versus $39,215 for females. The per capita income for the county was $32,188. About 10.0% of families and 14.4% of the population were below the poverty line, including 21.4% of those under age 18 and 7.3% of those age 65 or over.

=== 2000 census ===
As of the 2000 census, 129,292 people, 52,482 households, and 32,801 families resided in the county. The population density was 68 people per square mile (26/km²). The 57,701 housing units had an average density of 30/sq mi (12/km²). The racial makeup of the county was 73.52% White, 0.64% Black or African American, 3.08% Native American, 0.88% Asian, 0.07% Pacific Islander, 17.74% from other races, and 4.07% from two or more races. About 49.04% of the population were Hispanics or Latinos of any race.

Of the 52,482 households, 30.4% had children under 18 living with them, 45.5% were married couples living together, 11.7% had a female householder with no husband present, and 37.5% were not families. Aboout 29.4% of all households were made up of individuals, and 7.4% had someone living alone who was 65 or older. The average household size was 2.42 and the average family size was 3.01.

In the county, the age distribution was 24.1% under 18, 8.1% from 18 to 24, 29.7% from 25 to 44, 27.3% from 45 to 64, and 10.8% who were 65 or older. The median age was 38 years. For every 100 females there were 95.8 males. For every 100 females 18 and over, there were 93.4 males.

The median income for a household in the county was $42,207, and for a family was $50,000. Males had a median income of $33,287 versus $27,780 for females. The per capita income for the county was $23,594. About 9.4% of families and 12% of the population were below the poverty line, including 15.2% of those under 18 and 9.7% of those 65 or over.

== Government ==
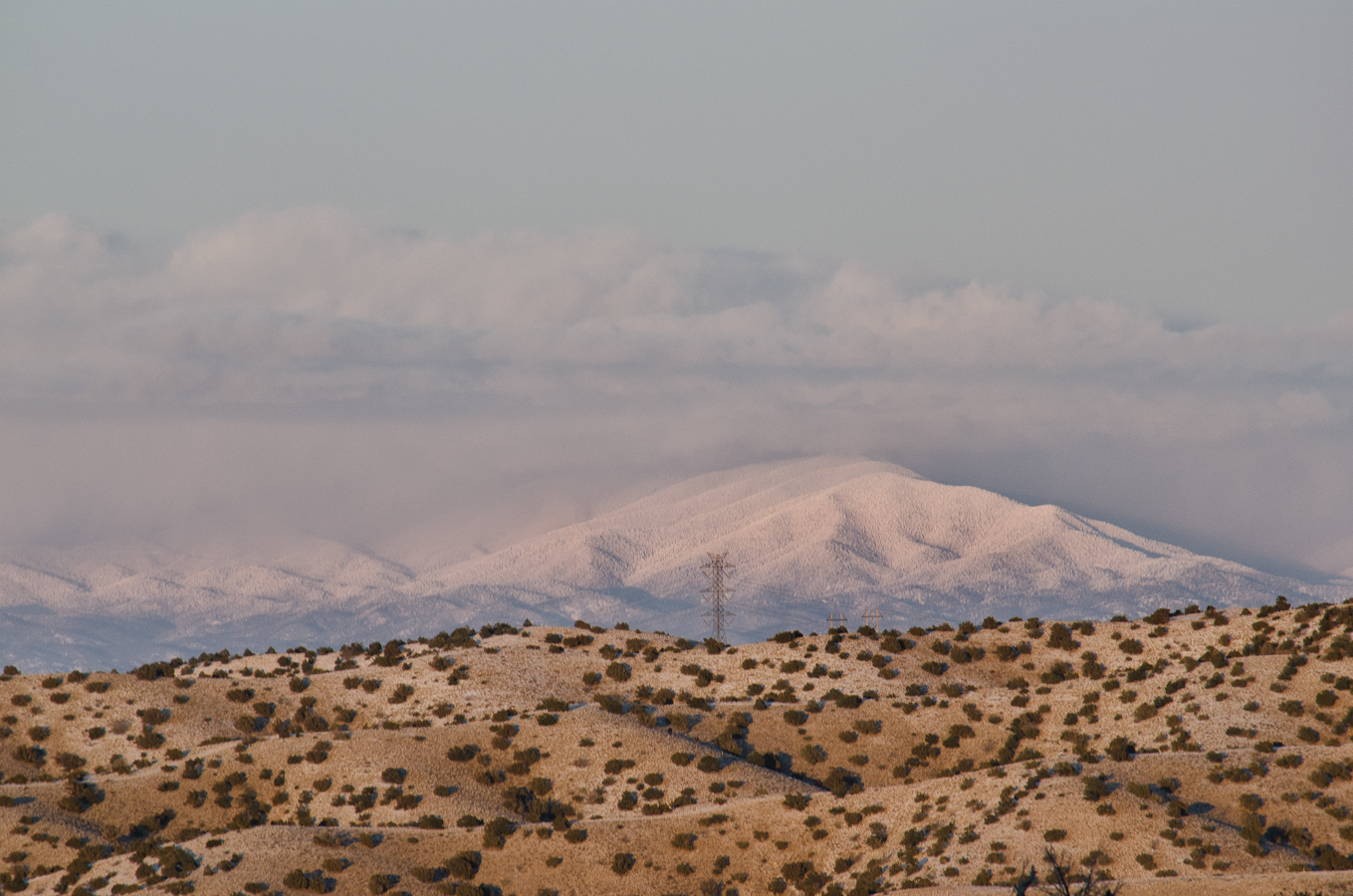
Santa Fe Baldy

The county is governed by a five-member county commission, whose members are elected from single-member districts (see map). Elections are partisan and all five seats are currently held by Democrats. County commissioners serve four-year terms, with term limits preventing them from serving more than two full terms.

Current commissioners are:

District	Name	Party	First elected	Term ends
District 1	Justin Greene	Democratic	2022	2025
District 2	Anna Hansen	Democratic	2017	2024
District 3	Camilla Bustamante	Democratic	2022	2025
District 4	Anna Hamilton	Democratic	2017	2024
District 5	Hank Hughes	Democratic	2021	2024

As well, five elected officials take on the roles of assessor, clerk, probate judge, sheriff, and treasurer:

Role	Name	Party	First elected	Term ends
Assessor	Isaiah F. Romero	Democratic	2023	2026
Clerk	Katharine E. Clark	Democratic	2021	2024
Probate Judge	Cordilia Montoya	Democratic	2020	2026
Sheriff	Adan Mendoza	Democratic	2019	2026
Treasurer	Jennifer J. Manzanares	Democratic	2021	2024

The New Mexico Corrections Department and the Penitentiary of New Mexico are located in an unincorporated area in the county.

Santa Fe County is a Democratic Party stronghold, rivaling Taos County as the most Democratic county in New Mexico. The last Republican to carry the county in a presidential election was Richard Nixon in 1972, although Ronald Reagan nearly carried it in 1980. In 1984, Democrat Walter Mondale won Santa Fe County by a solid margin over the incumbent president Reagan. Since 1988, Democrats Michael Dukakis, Bill Clinton, Al Gore, John Kerry, Barack Obama, Hillary Clinton, Joe Biden, and Kamala Harris all carried Santa Fe County by significant margins.

United States presidential election results for Santa Fe County, New Mexico
Year	Republican		Democratic		Third party(ies)	
Year	No.	%	No.	%	No.	%
1912	1,432	49.41%	1,012	34.92%	454	15.67%
1916	1,830	56.17%	1,406	43.16%	22	0.68%
1920	3,060	63.92%	1,700	35.51%	27	0.56%
1924	4,010	59.05%	2,602	38.32%	179	2.64%
1928	4,630	60.25%	3,051	39.70%	4	0.05%
1932	3,625	38.60%	5,739	61.12%	26	0.28%
1936	4,960	44.56%	6,145	55.20%	27	0.24%
1940	6,285	49.22%	6,482	50.76%	3	0.02%
1944	5,482	52.73%	4,915	47.27%	0	0.00%
1948	7,491	54.56%	6,172	44.95%	68	0.50%
1952	9,011	56.62%	6,786	42.64%	119	0.75%
1956	9,359	56.92%	6,997	42.56%	85	0.52%
1960	7,411	41.43%	10,385	58.05%	94	0.53%
1964	5,834	31.50%	12,616	68.12%	69	0.37%
1968	9,359	48.12%	9,544	49.07%	546	2.81%
1972	12,211	52.53%	10,761	46.29%	274	1.18%
1976	11,576	44.53%	14,127	54.34%	294	1.13%
1980	12,361	42.86%	12,658	43.89%	3,819	13.24%
1984	15,886	45.98%	18,262	52.85%	404	1.17%
1988	12,891	34.91%	23,581	63.86%	455	1.23%
1992	9,684	22.56%	27,189	63.35%	6,044	14.08%
1996	10,857	25.58%	26,349	62.08%	5,240	12.35%
2000	13,974	28.25%	32,017	64.72%	3,480	7.03%
2004	18,466	27.89%	47,074	71.11%	660	1.00%
2008	15,807	21.89%	55,567	76.94%	849	1.18%
2012	15,500	22.38%	50,872	73.47%	2,873	4.15%
2016	14,332	20.06%	50,793	71.10%	6,309	8.83%
2020	18,329	22.29%	62,530	76.05%	1,368	1.66%
2024	20,457	24.44%	61,405	73.35%	1,857	2.22%

== Education ==
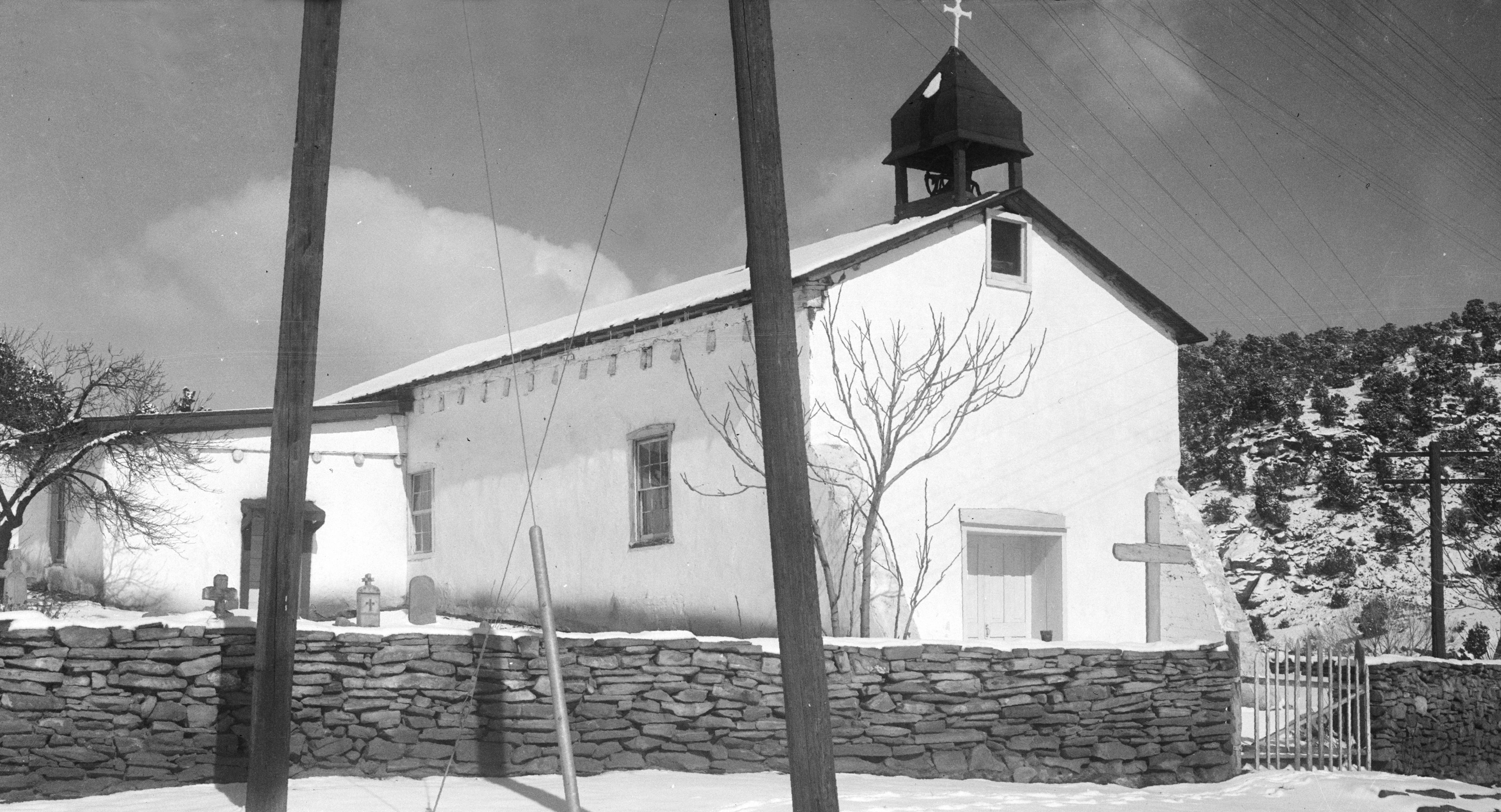
Nuestra Senora de Luz Church, Canoncito

Currently, four school districts serve Santa Fe County:

- Española Public Schools
- Moriarty Municipal Schools
- Pojoaque Valley Public Schools
- Santa Fe Public Schools

State-operated school:

- New Mexico School for the Deaf

Bureau of Indian Education (BIE)-affiliated schools:

- Santa Fe Indian School (tribal)
- San Ildefonso Day School (BIE-operated) - San Ildefonso Pueblo
- Te Tsu Geh Oweenge Day School a.k.a. Tesuque Day School (tribal) - Tesuque Pueblo)

== Communities ==
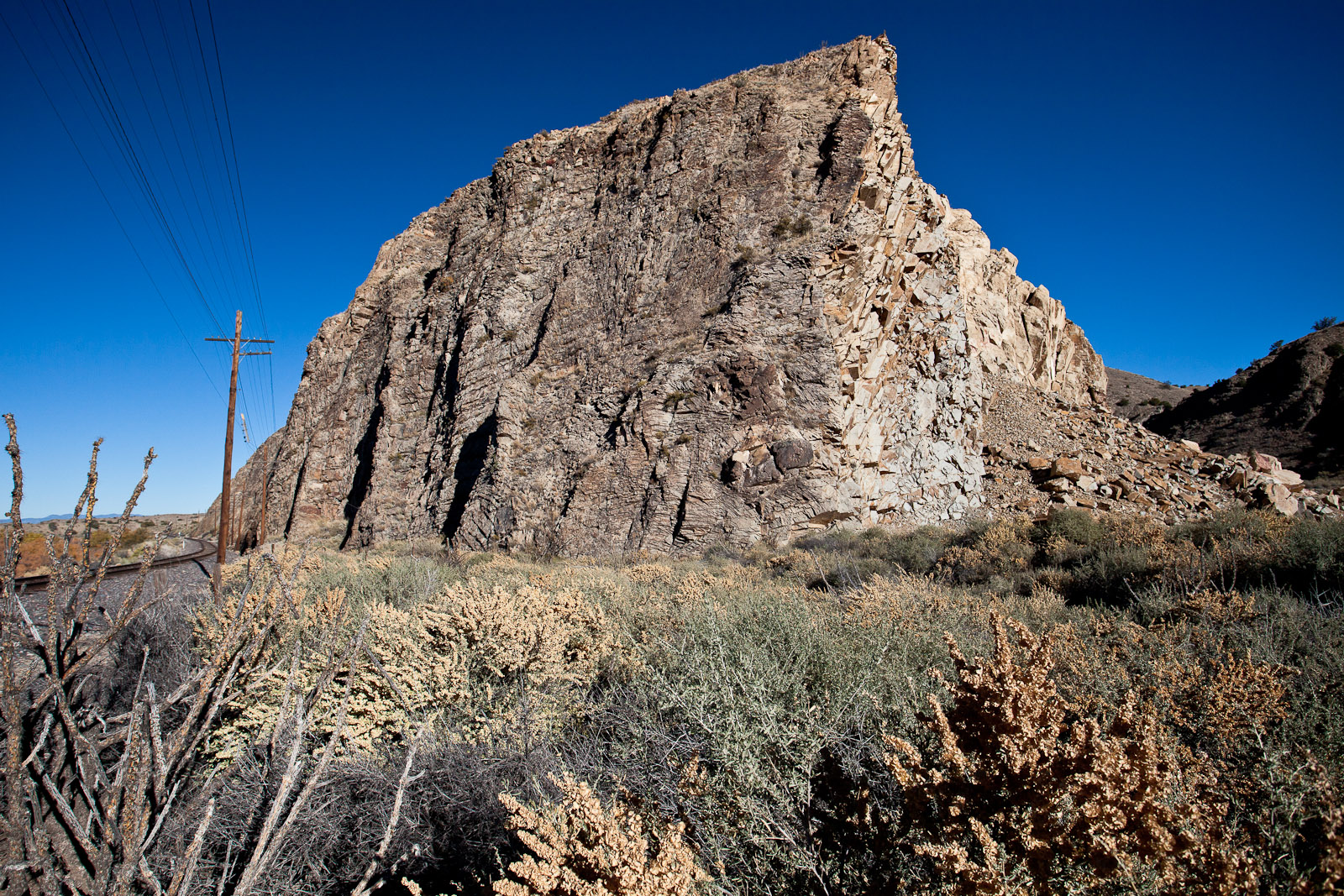
Devils Throne, a landmark near Cerrillos

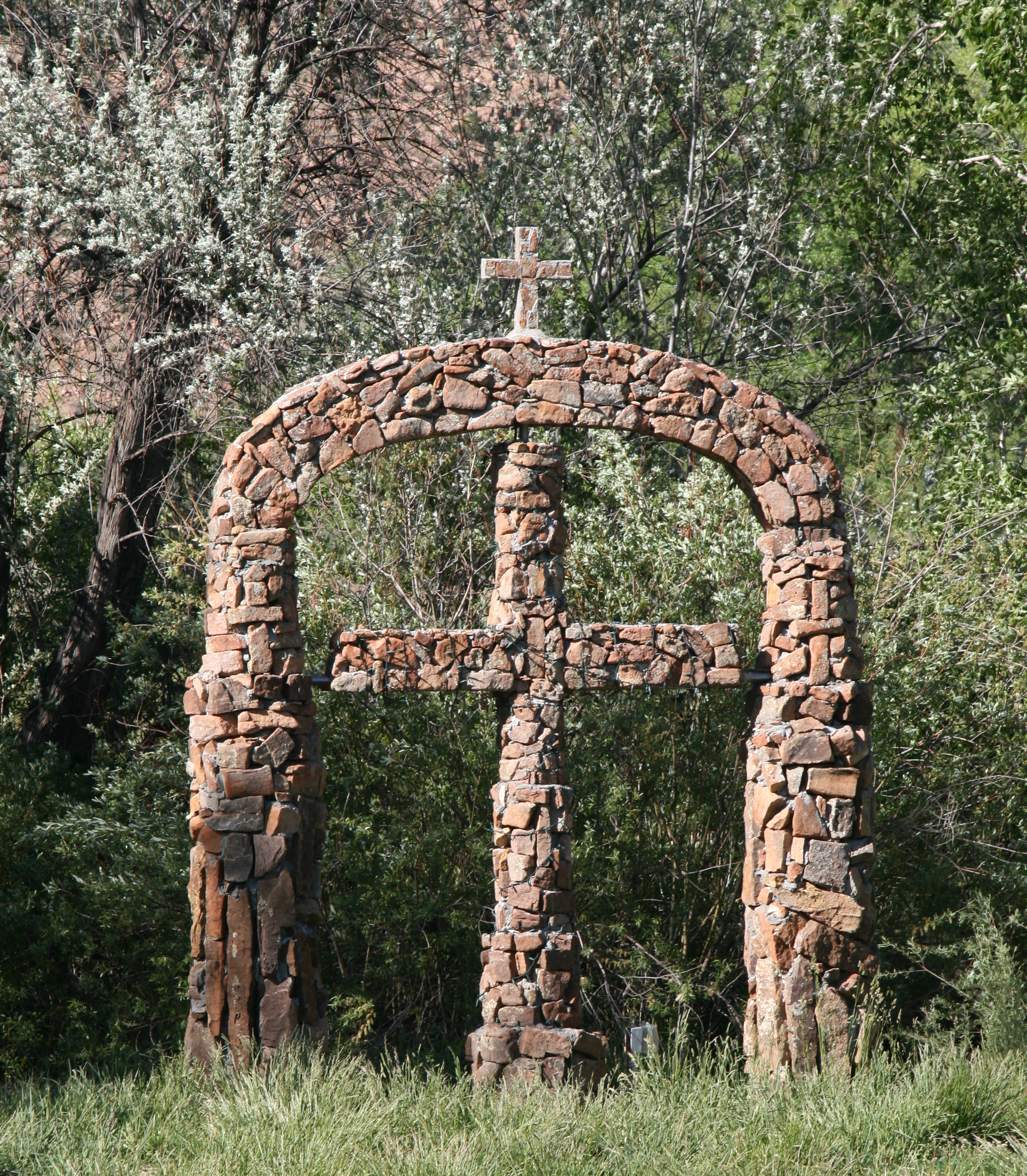
Stone arch and cross, El Santuario de Chimayó

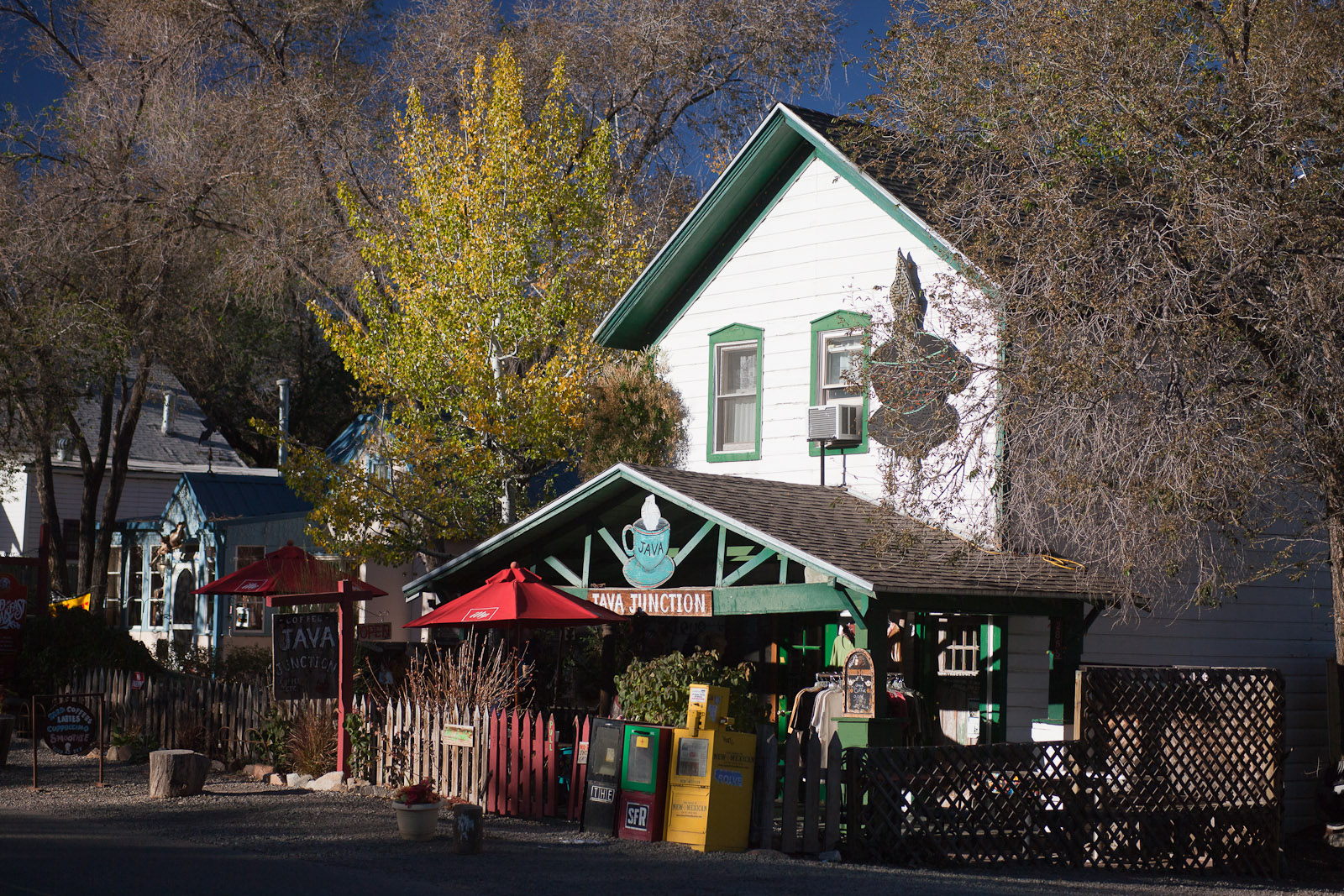
Java Junction, Madrid

=== Cities ===
- Española
- Santa Fe (county seat)

=== Town ===
- Edgewood

=== Census-designated places ===
- Agua Fria
- Arroyo Hondo
- Barton (part)
- Cañada de los Alamos
- Cañoncito
- Cedar Grove
- Chimayo (part)
- Chupadero
- Conejo
- Cuartelez
- Cundiyo
- Cuyamungue
- Cuyamungue Grant
- El Rancho
- El Valle de Arroyo Seco
- Eldorado at Santa Fe
- Encantado
- Galisteo
- Glorieta
- Golden
- Hyde Park
- Jacona
- Jaconita
- La Bajada
- La Cienega
- La Cueva
- La Puebla
- La Tierra
- Lamy
- Las Campanas
- Los Cerrillos
- Madrid
- Nambe
- Peak Place
- Pojoaque
- Rio Chiquito (part)
- Rio en Medio
- San Ildefonso Pueblo
- San Pedro
- Santa Cruz
- Santa Fe Foothills
- Seton Village
- Sombrillo
- Stanley
- Sunlit Hills
- Tano Road
- Tesuque
- Tesuque Pueblo
- Thunder Mountain
- Tres Arroyos
- Valencia
- Valle Vista

=== Other unincorporated communities ===
- Cañoncito
- La Loma
- Totavi
- Waldo

== Transportation ==
=== Major highways ===
- I-25 / US 85 (unsigned)
- I-40
- US 84
- US 285
- NM 4
- NM 14
- NM 16
- NM 30
- NM 41
- NM 45
- NM 50
- NM 76
- NM 106
- NM 291
- NM 300
- NM 333
- NM 344
- NM 399
- NM 466
- NM 472
- NM 475
- NM 502
- NM 503
- NM 583
- NM 592
- NM 599

=== Public transit ===
- Santa Fe Trails is the primary bus system serving Santa Fe.
- New Mexico Rail Runner Express (NMRX) is a commuter rail service with Santa Fe as its northern terminus. From there it serves Albuquerque and continues to Belen.

=== Air ===
The Santa Fe Regional Airport serves Santa Fe.

== See also ==
- National Register of Historic Places listings in Santa Fe County, New Mexico
