= Santa Fe Public Schools =

School district based in Santa Fe, New Mexico, US

Location
- Santa Fe, New Mexico Northern New Mexico; Santa Fe, New Mexico

District information
- Type: Public
- Motto: "Striving for excellence."
- Grades: K-12
- Established: 1896
- Superintendent: Hilario "Larry" Chavez

Students and staff
- Students: 11,253

Other information
- Website: www.sfps.info

Santa Fe Public Schools (SFPS) is a school district based in Santa Fe, New Mexico. Santa Fe Public Schools serves the city of Santa Fe, the communities of Tesuque and Eldorado, and the historic neighborhood of Agua Fria, and other communities with a total area of 1,016 square miles (2,630 km^{2}). The school district has a total of 31 schools: three high schools, three combined high/middle schools, three middle schools, and 21 elementary schools (of which five are community schools).

== History ==
Stanley was formerly in the Santa Fe School District, which operated a school in Stanley, which in 1962 had 150 students. In 1962 that district's school board approved a plan to have the district moved to Moriarty Municipal Schools. Meanwhile Glorieta was to be moved to the Santa Fe district. The superintendent of the Santa Fe district advocated for closing the Stanley School because of the following reasons: was in close proximity to the one of Moriarty, that it would not be viable as an elementary only school if only the high school were closed, the poor physical state of the building and it was not meeting the academic benchmarks set by the state government of New Mexico.

Hilario "Larry Chavez" began his term as superintendent in 2021.

== Service area ==
The school district serves, in addition to Santa Fe: Agua Fria, Arroyo Hondo, Cañada de los Alamos, Cañoncito, Chupadero, Conejo, Eldorado at Santa Fe, Encantado, Galisteo, Glorieta, Hyde Park, La Bajada, La Cienega, La Cueva, Las Campanas, Lamy, Los Cerrillos, Madrid, Rio en Medio, Santa Fe Foothills, Seton Village, Sunlit Hills, Tesuque, Tres Arroyos, Valencia, and Valle Vista. It also serves almost all of Tano Road, most of La Tierra, and a small portion of Peak Place.

== Schools ==
=== High schools ===
- Capital High School
- Desert Sage Academy
- Early College Opportunities
- Mandela International Magnet School- Serves grade 7-12
- Santa Fe High School

=== Community schools (K-8) ===
- Amy Biehl Community School
  - Also known as Amy Biehl at Rancho Viejo Community School, it has 64,000 square feet (5,900 m^{2}) of space. It was named after Amy Biehl. Pam De La O, the first principal, participated in the design of the school. 2010 was its planned year of opening.
- Aspen Community Magnet School (formed as merger from three other schools)
  - Alvord Elementary (closed)
  - Kaune Elementary (closed)
  - Larragoite Elementary (closed)
- El Camino Real Academy
- El Dorado Community School (Eldorado)
- Gonzales Community School
- Nina Otero Community School

=== Middle schools ===
- Milagro Middle School
- Edward Ortiz Middle School
- Mandela International Magnet School

Closed:

- Alameda Middle School
- B.F. Young Middle School
- Harrington Junior High
- Leah Harvey Middle School
- Capshaw Middle School
- DeVargas Middle School

=== Elementary schools ===
- Acequia Madre Elementary
- Agua Fria Elementary (Agua Fria)
- Atalaya Elementary
- Carlos Gilbert Elementary
- Chaparral Elementary
- Cielo Azul Elementary
  - Formerly known as César Chávez Elementary. Santa Fe Public Schools' school board voted unanimously to change the school's name following public allegations that César Chávez, the American labor leader and activist the school was named after, had sexually abused women and minors. The school was temporarily named White Tigers Elementary until the permanent name change to Cielo Azul Elementary was approved on June 11, 2026.
- E.J. Martinez Elementary
- El Camino Real Academy
- Kearny Elementary
- Francis X. Nava Elementary
- Piñon Elementary
- Ramirez Thomas Elementary
  - Nye Early Childhood Center (Pre-K program)
- Salazar Elementary
- R. M. Sweeney Elementary
- Tesuque Elementary (Tesuque)
- Wood Gormley Elementary

== Dress code ==
Beginning circa 1998 the district required elementary and middle school students to wear standardized dress (school uniforms). This was ended in 2018 as low income parents complained that the standardized dress caused their clothing expenditures to rise, and as teachers felt that policing the student dress caused too many absences and used too many class resources.

== See also ==
Charter schools:

- Monte del Sol Charter School
- Tierra Encantada Charter School
