= Santa Fe Foothills, New Mexico =

- Census-designated place
- Location within New Mexico Location within the United States
- Coordinates: 35°37′24″N 105°53′49″W
- Country: United States
- State: New Mexico
- County: Santa Fe

Area
  - Total: 8.28 sq mi (21.44 km^{2})
  - Land: 8.28 sq mi (21.44 km^{2})
  - Water: 0 sq mi (0.00 km^{2})
- Elevation: 7,615 ft (2,321 m)

Population (2020)
  - Total: 1,074
  - Density: 129.7/sq mi (50.09/km^{2})
- Time zone: UTC-7 (Mountain (MST))
  - Summer (DST): UTC-6 (MDT)
- ZIP Code: 87505 (Santa Fe)
- Area code: 505
- FIPS code: 35-70505
- GNIS feature ID: 2806766

Santa Fe Foothills is an unincorporated community and census-designated place (CDP) in Santa Fe County, New Mexico, United States. It was first listed as a CDP prior to the 2020 census. As of the 2020 census, Santa Fe Foothills had a population of 1,074.

The CDP is in northern Santa Fe County and is bordered to the northwest by the city of Santa Fe, the state capital, to the west by Conejo, to the southwest by Sunlit Hills, to the southeast by Cañada de los Alamos, and to the northeast by Santa Fe National Forest. The community is in the foothills of the southern end of the Sangre de Cristo Mountains.

== Demographics ==
Historical population
Census	Pop.	Note	%±
2020	1,074		—
U.S. Decennial Census

== Education ==
It is within Santa Fe Public Schools.
