= Capital High School (Santa Fe, New Mexico) =

Coordinates: 35°37′23″N 106°02′33″W

Location
- 4851 Paseo del Sol; Santa Fe, New Mexico 87507; United States

Information
- School type: Open, secondary school
- Motto: "Believe, Achieve, Succeed"
- Founded: 1988
- School district: Santa Fe Public Schools
- Teaching staff: 89.00 (FTE)
- Enrollment: 1,388 (2024–2025)
- Student to teacher ratio: 15.60
- Campus: Suburban
- Colors: Turquoise blue, silver, and black
- Athletics conference: NMAA - 2AAAAA League
- Mascot: Jaguar
- Rival: Santa Fe High School; St. Michael's High School; Española Valley High School
- Newspaper: Jaguar Voice
- Yearbook: The Jungle Book
- Website: http://capital.sfps.info/

Capital High School is a public secondary school located in the south side of Santa Fe, New Mexico, United States. The school, a part of Santa Fe Public Schools, was founded in 1988 and currently holds students in grades 9–12. The school's mascot is the Jaguar.

Capital High is most notable for its rigorous Advanced Placement and college readiness Advancement Via Individual Determination (AVID) programs, along with their exclusive Career Academy Capstone Mentorship program, which provides students with Medical, Business, Performing Arts and Digital Design academies.

Capital High School has seen growth in population and popularity as the south side of Santa Fe continues to expand.

== History ==
Capital High School was founded in 1988, and became the second major public secondary school in the city of Santa Fe. Its building is most notable for the white pillars that surround the facility and the structure of the school resembling the old State Capitol, which is now known as the Bataan Memorial Building in Downtown Santa Fe.

== Attendance boundary ==
The school serves sections of Santa Fe and a portion of La Cienega.

Previously the boundary included Los Cerrillos, Madrid and the rest of La Cienega. In 2017 the district recommended changing the boundary of these areas to Santa Fe High.

== Athletics ==
Capital High School currently competes in NM District 2-AAAAA of the New Mexico Activities Association. The school has won two state championships, one in boys' basketball and one in boys' soccer. These two continue to be Capital High School's most dominant athletic programs, generally being prominent contenders in state tournament competition annually. Santa Fe High School continues to be Capital High's most significant rival in all sports since it became the second public high school in the city. St. Michael's High School and Española Valley High School also have become traditional sporting rivals in recent years, with games in multiple sports attracting large attendances.

=== State Champions ===
- Boys' basketball, 2004
- Boys soccer, 2014
