= Tres Arroyos, New Mexico =

- Census-designated place
- Location within New Mexico Location within the United States
- Coordinates: 35°41′12″N 106°01′12″W
- Country: United States
- State: New Mexico
- County: Santa Fe

Area
  - Total: 9.23 sq mi (23.91 km^{2})
  - Land: 9.23 sq mi (23.91 km^{2})
  - Water: 0 sq mi (0.00 km^{2})
- Elevation: 6,585 ft (2,007 m)

Population (2020)
  - Total: 2,123
  - Density: 229.9/sq mi (88.78/km^{2})
- Time zone: UTC-7 (Mountain (MST))
  - Summer (DST): UTC-6 (MDT)
- ZIP Code: 87507, 87506 (Santa Fe)
- Area code: 505
- FIPS code: 35-79500
- GNIS feature ID: 2806776

Tres Arroyos is an unincorporated community and census-designated place (CDP) in Santa Fe County, New Mexico, United States. As of the 2020 census, Tres Arroyos had a population of 2,123. It was first listed as a CDP prior to the 2020 census.

The CDP is in northern Santa Fe County and is bordered to the southeast by the city of Santa Fe, the state capital, to the northeast by Tano Road, and to the north by Las Campanas. New Mexico State Road 599 (Veterans Memorial Highway) forms the southeast border of the CDP; across it to the southeast is the CDP of Agua Fria. Downtown Santa Fe is 9 miles (14 km) to the east.

== Demographics ==
Historical population
Census	Pop.	Note	%±
2020	2,123		—
U.S. Decennial Census

=== 2020 census ===
As of the 2020 census, Tres Arroyos had a population of 2,123. The median age was 62.3 years. 10.1% of residents were under the age of 18 and 42.0% of residents were 65 years of age or older. For every 100 females there were 99.0 males, and for every 100 females age 18 and over there were 100.7 males age 18 and over.

0.0% of residents lived in urban areas, while 100.0% lived in rural areas.

There were 1,033 households in Tres Arroyos, of which 13.1% had children under the age of 18 living in them. Of all households, 58.1% were married-couple households, 15.2% were households with a male householder and no spouse or partner present, and 20.3% were households with a female householder and no spouse or partner present. About 26.9% of all households were made up of individuals and 14.9% had someone living alone who was 65 years of age or older.

There were 1,173 housing units, of which 11.9% were vacant. The homeowner vacancy rate was 1.6% and the rental vacancy rate was 24.3%.

Racial composition as of the 2020 census
Race	Number	Percent
White	1,480	69.7%
Black or African American	11	0.5%
American Indian and Alaska Native	29	1.4%
Asian	42	2.0%
Native Hawaiian and Other Pacific Islander	0	0.0%
Some other race	194	9.1%
Two or more races	367	17.3%
Hispanic or Latino (of any race)	673	31.7%

== Education ==
It is within Santa Fe Public Schools.
