= Hyde Park, New Mexico =

- Census-designated place
- Location within New Mexico Location within the United States
- Coordinates: 35°42′40″N 105°53′12″W
- Country: United States
- State: New Mexico
- County: Santa Fe

Area
  - Total: 2.12 sq mi (5.50 km^{2})
  - Land: 2.12 sq mi (5.50 km^{2})
  - Water: 0 sq mi (0.00 km^{2})
- Elevation: 7,966 ft (2,428 m)

Population (2020)
  - Total: 285
  - Density: 134.3/sq mi (51.84/km^{2})
- Time zone: UTC-7 (Mountain (MST))
  - Summer (DST): UTC-6 (MDT)
- ZIP Code: 87501 (Santa Fe)
- Area code: 505
- FIPS code: 35-33920
- GNIS feature ID: 2806760

Hyde Park is an unincorporated community and census-designated place (CDP) in Santa Fe County, New Mexico, United States. It was first listed as a CDP prior to the 2020 census. As of the 2020 census, Hyde Park had a population of 285.

The CDP is in the northeast part of the county and is bordered to the west by the city of Santa Fe, the state capital, to the east by Santa Fe National Forest, and to the north by Little Tesuque Creek. New Mexico State Road 475 passes through the community, leading southwest 4 miles (6 km) to downtown Santa Fe and northeast to its end at Ski Santa Fe in the Sangre de Cristo Mountains.

== Demographics ==
Historical population
Census	Pop.	Note	%±
2020	285		—
U.S. Decennial Census

== Education ==
The community is within Santa Fe Public Schools.
