= Sunlit Hills, New Mexico =

- Census-designated place
- Location within New Mexico Location within the United States
- Coordinates: 35°35′45″N 105°55′16″W
- Country: United States
- State: New Mexico
- County: Santa Fe

Area
  - Total: 3.75 sq mi (9.72 km^{2})
  - Land: 3.75 sq mi (9.72 km^{2})
  - Water: 0 sq mi (0.00 km^{2})
- Elevation: 7,116 ft (2,169 m)

Population (2020)
  - Total: 736
  - Density: 196.2/sq mi (75.75/km^{2})
- Time zone: UTC-7 (Mountain (MST))
  - Summer (DST): UTC-6 (MDT)
- ZIP Code: 87508 (Santa Fe)
- Area code: 505
- FIPS code: 35-75650
- GNIS feature ID: 2806770

Sunlit Hills is an unincorporated community and census-designated place (CDP) in Santa Fe County, New Mexico, United States. It was first listed as a CDP prior to the 2020 census.

As of the 2020 census, Sunlit Hills had a population of 736.

The CDP is north of the geographic center of Santa Fe County and is bordered to the west by Seton Village, to the northwest by Arroyo Hondo, to the north by Conejo, and to the northeast by Santa Fe Foothills. Interstate 25 forms the eastern border of the CDP, with the closest access from Exit 284 (Old Pecos Trail), 3 miles (5 km) to the north. Santa Fe, the state capital, is 6 miles (10 km) to the north.

== Demographics ==
Historical population
Census	Pop.	Note	%±
2020	736		—
U.S. Decennial Census

== Education ==
It is within Santa Fe Public Schools.
