= Cuartelez, New Mexico =

- Census-designated place
- Location of Cuartelez, New Mexico

- Location in the United States
- Coordinates: 35°59′50″N 106°01′06″W
- Country: United States
- State: New Mexico
- County: Santa Fe

Area
  - Total: 1.37 sq mi (3.54 km^{2})
  - Land: 1.37 sq mi (3.54 km^{2})
  - Water: 0 sq mi (0.00 km^{2})
- Elevation: 5,906 ft (1,800 m)

Population (2020)
  - Total: 455
  - Density: 332.8/sq mi (128.49/km^{2})
- Time zone: UTC-7 (Mountain (MST))
  - Summer (DST): UTC-6 (MDT)
- Area code: 505
- FIPS code: 35-19110
- GNIS feature ID: 2408630

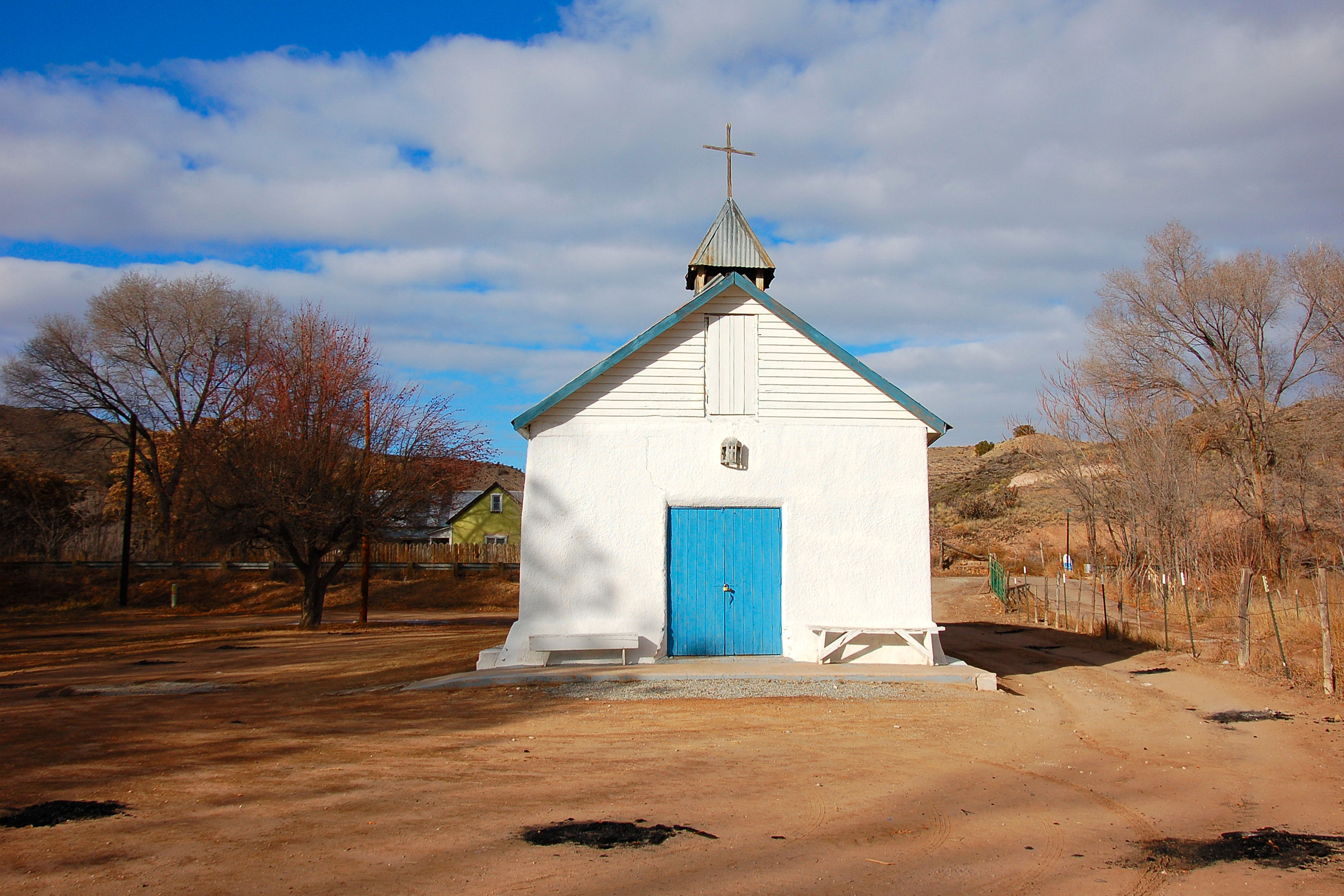
Sangre de Cristo Chapel, Cuarteles, NM

Cuartelez (or Cuarteles) is a census-designated place (CDP) in Santa Fe County, New Mexico, United States. It is part of the Santa Fe, New Mexico Metropolitan Statistical Area. As of the 2020 census, Cuartelez had a population of 455.

== Geography ==
According to the United States Census Bureau, the CDP has a total area of 1.4 square miles (3.6 km^{2}), all land.

== Demographics ==
Historical population
Census	Pop.	Note	%±
2020	455		—
U.S. Decennial Census

As of the census of 2000, there were 452 people, 165 households, and 129 families residing in the CDP. The population density was 339.9 inhabitants per square mile (131.2/km^{2}). There were 198 housing units at an average density of 148.9 per square mile (57.5/km^{2}). The racial makeup of the CDP was 57.74% White, 1.77% Native American, 34.73% from other races, and 5.75% from two or more races. Hispanic or Latino of any race were 86.06% of the population.

There were 165 households, out of which 41.8% had children under the age of 18 living with them, 57.6% were married couples living together, 13.3% had a female householder with no husband present, and 21.8% were non-families. 17.0% of all households were made up of individuals, and 2.4% had someone living alone who was 65 years of age or older. The average household size was 2.74 and the average family size was 3.06.

In the CDP, the population was spread out, with 27.7% under the age of 18, 10.4% from 18 to 24, 31.9% from 25 to 44, 19.7% from 45 to 64, and 10.4% who were 65 years of age or older. The median age was 31 years. For every 100 females, there were 105.5 males. For every 100 females age 18 and over, there were 98.2 males.

The median income for a household in the CDP was $33,906, and the median income for a family was $27,426. Males had a median income of $19,700 versus $27,083 for females. The per capita income for the CDP was $17,445. About 19.1% of families and 9.6% of the population were below the poverty line, including 7.5% of those under age 18 and none of those age 65 or over.

== See also ==
- List of census-designated places in New Mexico
