= Cedar Grove, New Mexico =

- CDP
- Location of Cedar Grove, New Mexico

- Location in the United States
- Coordinates: 35°10′34″N 106°08′56″W
- Country: United States
- State: New Mexico
- County: Santa Fe

Area
  - Total: 12.78 sq mi (33.09 km^{2})
  - Land: 12.76 sq mi (33.06 km^{2})
  - Water: 0.012 sq mi (0.03 km^{2})
- Elevation: 6,746 ft (2,056 m)

Population (2020)
  - Total: 549
  - Density: 43/sq mi (16.6/km^{2})
- Time zone: UTC-7 (Mountain (MST))
  - Summer (DST): UTC-6 (MDT)
- Area code: 505
- FIPS code: 35-13270
- GNIS feature ID: 2407999

Cedar Grove is a census-designated place (CDP) in Santa Fe County, New Mexico, United States. It is part of the Santa Fe, New Mexico Metropolitan Statistical Area. As of the 2020 census, Cedar Grove had a population of 549. Cedar Grove was formerly a stage and freight stop. It has developed into a Santa Fe suburb. New Mexico "cedars" (junipers) are abundant in the town.

== Geography ==
According to the United States Census Bureau, the CDP has a total area of 18.0 square miles (47 km^{2}), of which 18.0 square miles (47 km^{2}) is land and 0.02 square miles (0.052 km^{2}) (0.1%) is water.

== Demographics ==
Historical population
Census	Pop.	Note	%±
2020	549		—
U.S. Decennial Census

As of the census of 2000, there were 599 people, 224 households, and 167 families residing in the CDP. The population density was 30.5 inhabitants per square mile (11.8/km^{2}). There were 249 housing units at an average density of 12.7 per square mile (4.9/km^{2}). The racial makeup of the CDP was 84.97% White, 0.50% African American, 0.67% Native American, 0.83% Pacific Islander, 9.68% from other races, and 3.34% from two or more races. Hispanic or Latino of any race were 20.20% of the population.

There were 224 households, out of which 35.3% had children under the age of 18 living with them, 64.3% were married couples living together, 6.3% had a female householder with no husband present, and 25.4% were non-families. 18.3% of all households were made up of individuals, and 6.7% had someone living alone who was 65 years of age or older. The average household size was 2.67 and the average family size was 3.09.

In the CDP, the population was spread out, with 27.5% under the age of 18, 4.3% from 18 to 24, 31.1% from 25 to 44, 27.9% from 45 to 64, and 9.2% who were 65 years of age or older. The median age was 40 years. For every 100 females, there were 96.4 males. For every 100 females age 18 and over, there were 92.0 males.

The median income for a household in the CDP was $42,750, and the median income for a family was $47,560. Males had a median income of $41,146 versus $43,462 for females. The per capita income for the CDP was $16,585. About 16.0% of families and 16.3% of the population were below the poverty line, including 9.2% of those under age 18 and 27.5% of those age 65 or over.

== Education ==
It is within Moriarty-Edgewood School District.

== See also ==
- List of census-designated places in New Mexico
