= La Cienega, New Mexico =

- Census-designated place
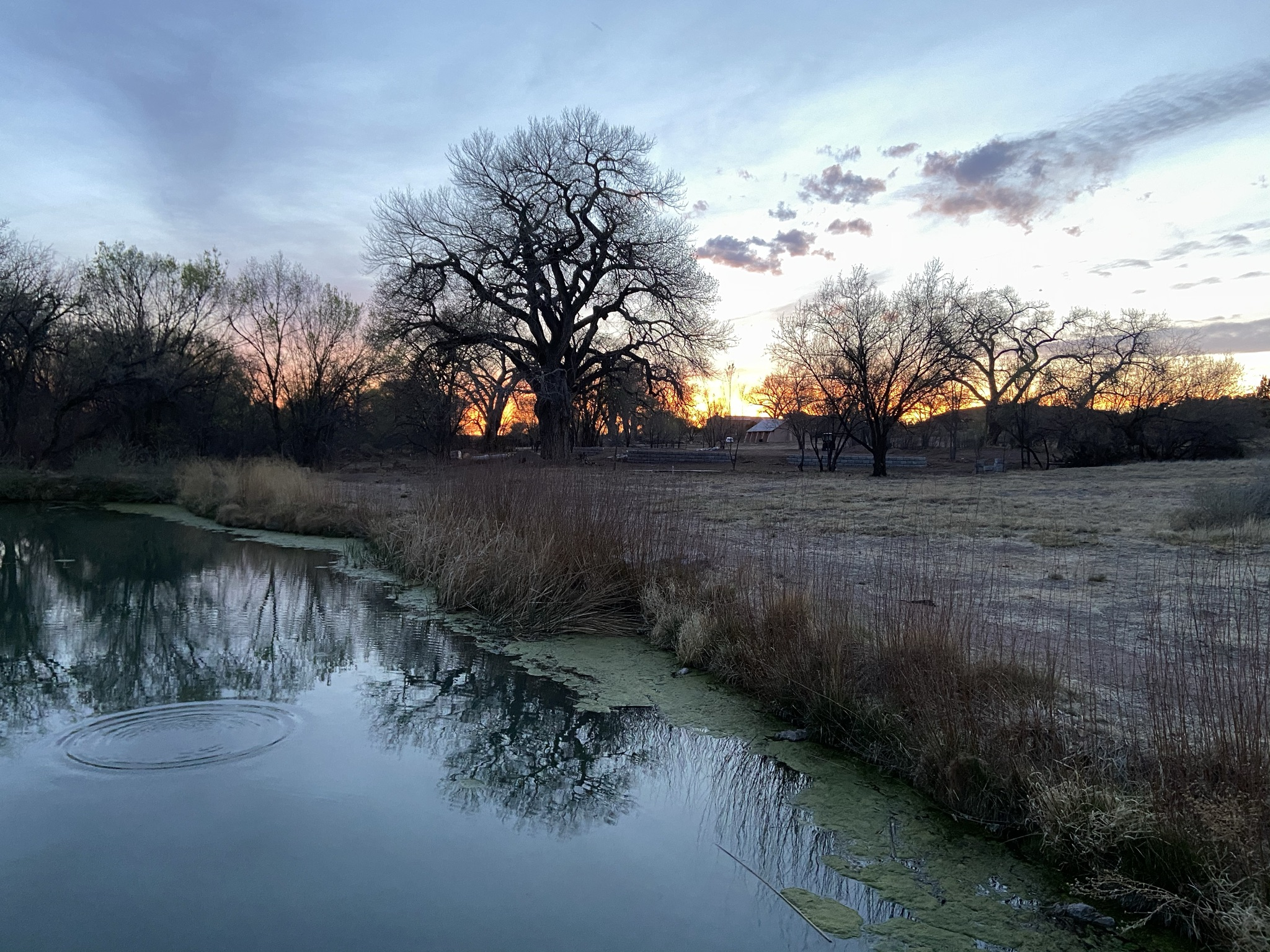
- Fishing pond in La Ciénega New Mexico

- Location of La Cienega, New Mexico

- Location in the United States
- Coordinates: 35°34′25″N 106°07′32″W
- Country: United States
- State: New Mexico
- County: Santa Fe

Area
  - Total: 11.66 sq mi (30.20 km^{2})
  - Land: 11.66 sq mi (30.20 km^{2})
  - Water: 0 sq mi (0.00 km^{2})
- Elevation: 6,158 ft (1,877 m)

Population (2020)
  - Total: 3,885
  - Density: 333.2/sq mi (128.64/km^{2})
- Time zone: UTC-7 (Mountain (MST))
  - Summer (DST): UTC-6 (MDT)
- Area code: 505
- FIPS code: 35-36720
- GNIS feature ID: 2408502
- Website: La Cienega Valley Association

La Cienega is a census-designated place (CDP) in Santa Fe County, New Mexico, United States. It is part of the Santa Fe, New Mexico, metropolitan statistical area. As of the 2020 census, La Cienega had a population of 3,885.

La Cienega is located on the site of the Keres or Tewa pueblo of Tzeguma, which took part in the 1680 Pueblo Revolt.

== Geography ==
According to the United States Census Bureau, the CDP has a total area of 13.4 square miles (35 km^{2}), all land.

The South End of the Rockies Historical Marker, marking the southern terminus of the Rocky Mountains, is about three miles west of La Cienega.

== History ==
The historical Village of La Cienega is surrounded by multiple springs and the spring brooks they feed, where, due to the geology, the aquifer rises to the surface. For many centuries these springs have been used for agriculture and as a source of water for the settlement of a historical pueblo of the Keres people. The former La Cienega Pueblo site contains archaeological evidence of "probable water catchment features" as well as petroglyphs on the basalt cliffs, and ruins of prehistoric room blocks at the site of the historic La Cienega Pithouse Village that are believed, by archaeologists, to be used for both ceremonial and domestic purposes.

== Wetlands ==
The cienega (spring and associated marsh) later supplied water to El Rancho de las Golondrinas and the Santa Fe River Canyon at the foot of the Caja del Rio. The cienega itself is managed by the Santa Fe Botanical Garden as the Leonora Curtin Wetland Preserve. La Cienega is an Area of Critical Environmental Concern and has been a focus of recent efforts to create an open space corridor between Santa Fe and the Rio Grande.

== Demographics ==
Historical population
| Census | Pop. | Note | %± |
|---|---|---|---|
| 2020 | 3,885 | | — |
U.S. Decennial Census

=== 2020 census ===
As of the 2020 census, La Cienega had a population of 3,885. The median age was 41.6 years. 20.9% of residents were under the age of 18 and 16.2% of residents were 65 years of age or older. For every 100 females there were 103.2 males, and for every 100 females age 18 and over there were 100.1 males age 18 and over.

62.7% of residents lived in urban areas, while 37.3% lived in rural areas.

There were 1,383 households in La Cienega, of which 31.3% had children under the age of 18 living in them. Of all households, 51.0% were married-couple households, 19.0% were households with a male householder and no spouse or partner present, and 20.9% were households with a female householder and no spouse or partner present. About 24.9% of all households were made up of individuals and 9.3% had someone living alone who was 65 years of age or older.

There were 1,483 housing units, of which 6.7% were vacant. The homeowner vacancy rate was 1.2% and the rental vacancy rate was 5.9%.

Racial composition as of the 2020 census
| Race | Number | Percent |
|---|---|---|
| White | 1,623 | 41.8% |
| Black or African American | 17 | 0.4% |
| American Indian and Alaska Native | 85 | 2.2% |
| Asian | 30 | 0.8% |
| Native Hawaiian and Other Pacific Islander | 1 | 0.0% |
| Some other race | 906 | 23.3% |
| Two or more races | 1,223 | 31.5% |
| Hispanic or Latino (of any race) | 2,922 | 75.2% |

=== 2000 census ===
As of the census of 2000, there were 3,007 people, 1,033 households, and 761 families residing in the CDP. The population density was 225.3 inhabitants per square mile (87.0/km^{2}). There were 1,079 housing units at an average density of 80.8 per square mile (31.2/km^{2}). The racial makeup of the CDP was 60.86% White, 0.50% African American, 1.43% Native American, 0.30% Asian, 0.07% Pacific Islander, 31.19% from other races, and 5.65% from two or more races. Hispanic or Latino of any race were 70.80% of the population.

There were 1,033 households, out of which 44.9% had children under the age of 18 living with them, 56.1% were married couples living together, 10.5% had a female householder with no husband present, and 26.3% were non-families. 19.2% of all households were made up of individuals, and 2.2% had someone living alone who was 65 years of age or older. The average household size was 2.91 and the average family size was 3.35.

In the CDP, the population was spread out, with 31.1% under the age of 18, 8.8% from 18 to 24, 33.9% from 25 to 44, 22.0% from 45 to 64, and 4.3% who were 65 years of age or older. The median age was 32 years. For every 100 females, there were 103.9 males. For every 100 females age 18 and over, there were 104.3 males.

The median income for a household in the CDP was $38,028, and the median income for a family was $46,578. Males had a median income of $31,178 versus $30,092 for females. The per capita income for the CDP was $17,329. About 7.2% of families and 6.8% of the population were below the poverty line, including 3.3% of those under age 18 and 8.1% of those age 65 or over.

== Education ==
It is within Santa Fe Public Schools.

The area is divided between the boundary of Nina Otero Community School (K-8) and those of Amy Biehl Elementary School and Milagro Middle School. The area is divided between Santa Fe High School and Capital High School.

Previously all of it was zoned to Capital High. In 2017 the district recommended changing the boundary of a section of the area to Santa Fe High.

== Gallery ==
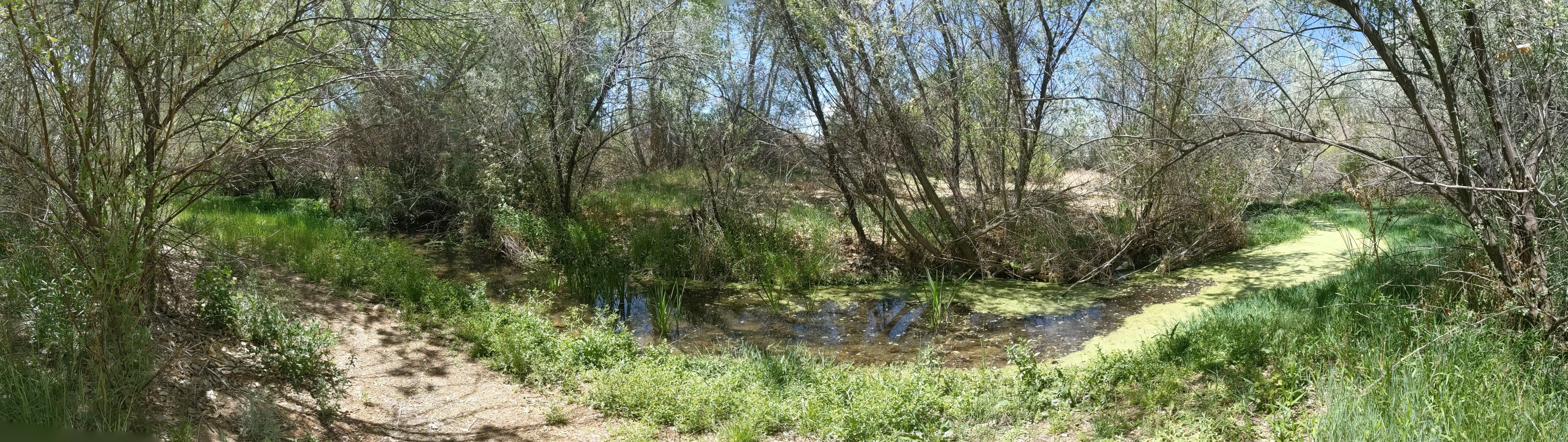
Cienega Creek above La Cienega, near the spring

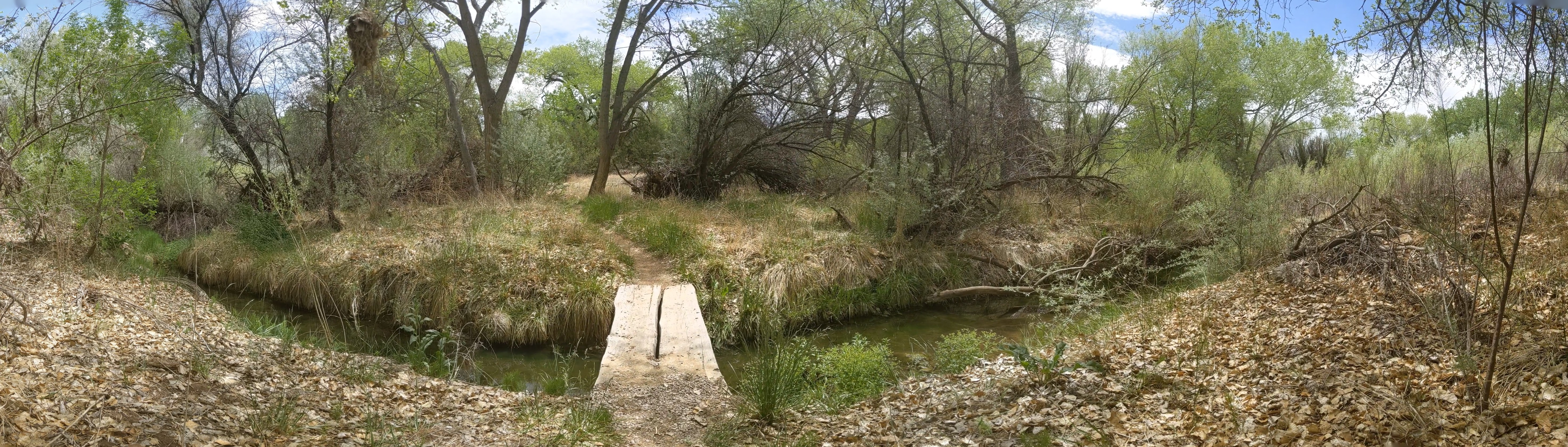
Arroyo Hondo, a tributary to Cienega Creek above La Cienega
