= Tano Road, New Mexico =

- Census-designated place
- Location within New Mexico Location within the United States
- Coordinates: 35°44′15″N 105°58′41″W
- Country: United States
- State: New Mexico
- County: Santa Fe

Area
  - Total: 11.54 sq mi (29.90 km^{2})
  - Land: 11.54 sq mi (29.90 km^{2})
  - Water: 0 sq mi (0.00 km^{2})
- Elevation: 7,054 ft (2,150 m)

Population (2020)
  - Total: 1,573
  - Density: 136.3/sq mi (52.61/km^{2})
- Time zone: UTC-7 (Mountain (MST))
  - Summer (DST): UTC-6 (MDT)
- ZIP Code: 87506 (Santa Fe)
- Area code: 505
- FIPS code: 35-76165
- GNIS feature ID: 2806772

Tano Road is an unincorporated community and census-designated place (CDP) in Santa Fe County, New Mexico, United States. As of the 2020 census, Tano Road had a population of 1,573. It was first listed as a CDP prior to the 2020 census.

The CDP is in northern Santa Fe County and is bordered to the south and east by the city of Santa Fe, the state capital, to the southwest by Tres Arroyos and Las Campanas, and to the northwest by La Tierra.

== Demographics ==
Historical population
Census	Pop.	Note	%±
2020	1,573		—
U.S. Decennial Census

== Education ==
Almost all of Tano Road is within Santa Fe Public Schools. A small portion is in Pojoaque Valley Public Schools. Pojoaque Valley High School is the zoned school for Pojoaque Valley.
