= La Cueva, Santa Fe County, New Mexico =

La Cueva, New Mexico
- Unincorporated community
- Location within New Mexico
- Coordinates: 35°52′25″N 106°38′56″W
- Country: United States
- State: New Mexico
- County: Santa Fe
- Elevation: 7,769 ft (2,368 m)
- Time zone: UTC-7 (Mountain (MST))
  - Summer (DST): UTC-6 (MDT)
- Area code: 505
- GNIS feature ID: 2584123

La Cueva is an unincorporated community in Santa Fe County, New Mexico, United States. The community is 2.2 miles (3.5 km) east-northeast of Glorieta.

== Education ==
La Cueva's education falls under the Santa Fe Public Schools system. Zoned to El Dorado Community School (K-8) in El Dorado. Its high school is Santa Fe High School.
