= Valencia, Santa Fe County, New Mexico =

Valencia, New Mexico
- Unincorporated community Census-designated place
- Location within New Mexico Location within the United States
- Coordinates: 35°34′41″N 105°47′27″W
- Country: United States
- State: New Mexico
- County: Santa Fe

Area
  - Total: 1.55 sq mi (4.01 km^{2})
  - Land: 1.55 sq mi (4.01 km^{2})
  - Water: 0 sq mi (0.00 km^{2})
- Elevation: 7,320 ft (2,230 m)

Population (2020)
  - Total: 115
  - Density: 74.2/sq mi (28.65/km^{2})
- Time zone: UTC-7 (Mountain (MST))
  - Summer (DST): UTC-6 (MDT)
- ZIP Code: 87505 (Santa Fe); 87535 (Glorieta)
- Area code: 505
- FIPS code: 35-81775
- GNIS feature ID: 2812759

Valencia is an unincorporated community in Santa Fe County, New Mexico, United States. For statistical purposes, the United States Census Bureau first defined the community as a census-designated place (CDP) prior to the 2020 census.

The community is in eastern Santa Fe County, at the southern end of the Sangre de Cristo Mountains, and is bordered to the east by Glorieta. Interstate 25 passes through Valencia, with access from Exit 297. I-25 leads northwest (southbound) 17 miles (27 km) to Santa Fe and east (northbound) 49 miles (79 km) to Las Vegas, New Mexico. The highway crosses Glorieta Pass at the eastern border of the CDP.

== Demographics ==
Historical population
Census	Pop.	Note	%±
2020	115		—
U.S. Decennial Census

== Education ==
It is within Santa Fe Public Schools.

It is zoned to El Dorado Community School (K-8) in El Dorado. Its high school is Santa Fe High School.
