= Las Campanas, New Mexico =

- Census-designated place
- Location within New Mexico Location within the United States
- Coordinates: 35°42′40″N 106°02′03″W
- Country: United States
- State: New Mexico
- County: Santa Fe

Area
  - Total: 10.44 sq mi (27.03 km^{2})
  - Land: 10.44 sq mi (27.03 km^{2})
  - Water: 0 sq mi (0.00 km^{2})
- Elevation: 6,592 ft (2,009 m)

Population (2020)
  - Total: 1,460
  - Density: 139.9/sq mi (54.02/km^{2})
- Time zone: UTC-7 (Mountain (MST))
  - Summer (DST): UTC-6 (MDT)
- ZIP Code: 87506 (Santa Fe)
- Area code: 505
- FIPS code: 35-39332
- GNIS feature ID: 2806765

Las Campanas is a golf course community and census-designated place (CDP) in Santa Fe County, New Mexico, United States. It was first listed as a CDP prior to the 2020 census. As of the 2020 census, Las Campanas had a population of 1,460.

The CDP is in northwestern Santa Fe County and is bordered to the north by La Tierra, to the east by Tano Road, and to the south by Tres Arroyos. It is 9 miles (14 km) by road northwest of Santa Fe, the state capital. The Club at Las Campanas, a country club, is at the center of the community.

== Demographics ==
Historical population
Census	Pop.	Note	%±
2020	1,460		—
U.S. Decennial Census
