= Rio en Medio, New Mexico =

- CDP
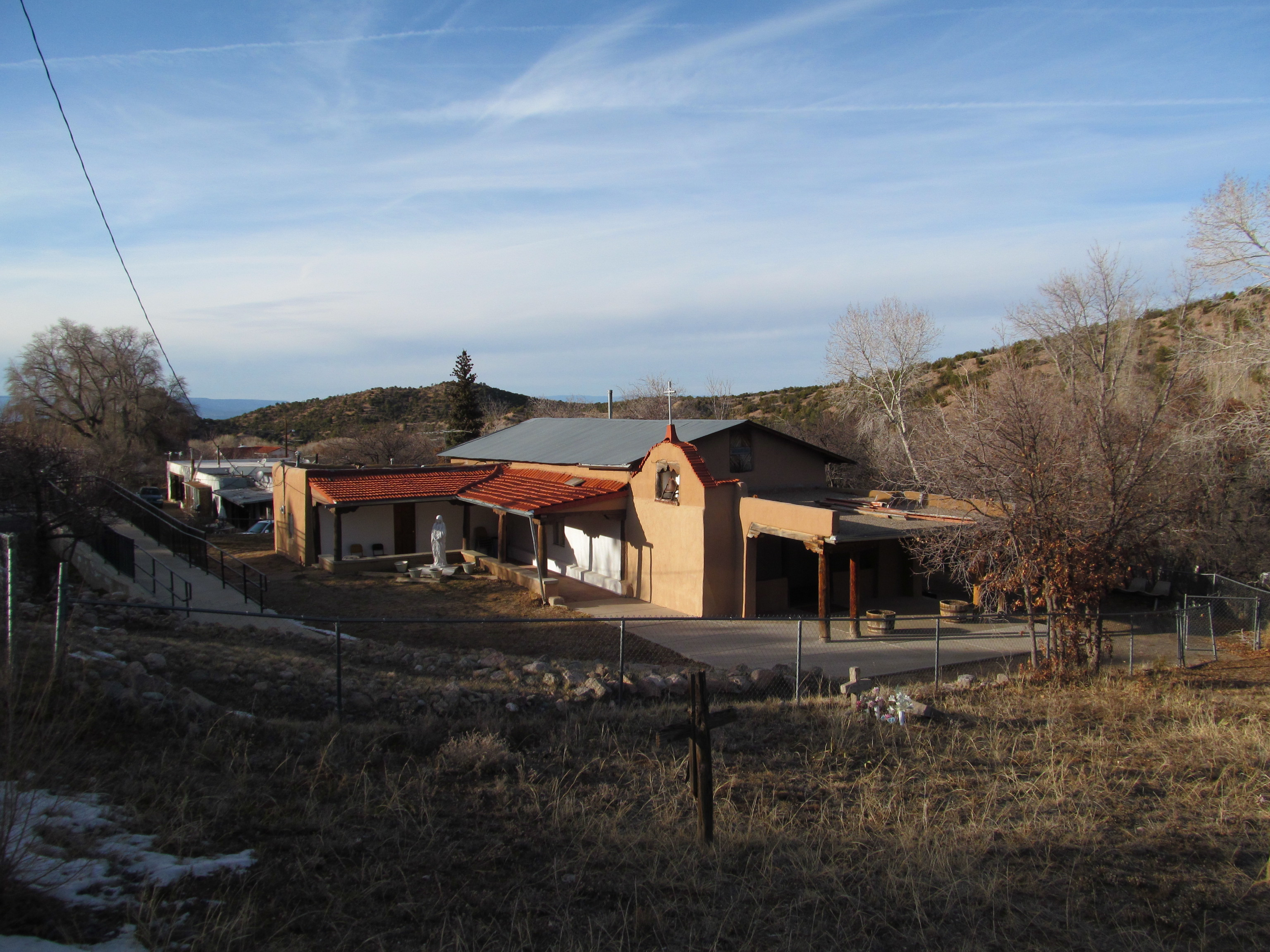

- Location of Rio en Medio, New Mexico

- Location in the United States
- Coordinates: 35°49′20″N 105°54′03″W
- Country: United States
- State: New Mexico
- County: Santa Fe

Area
  - Total: 0.66 sq mi (1.72 km^{2})
  - Land: 0.66 sq mi (1.72 km^{2})
  - Water: 0 sq mi (0.00 km^{2})
- Elevation: 7,218 ft (2,200 m)

Population (2020)
  - Total: 157
  - Density: 236.7/sq mi (91.39/km^{2})
- Time zone: UTC-7 (Mountain (MST))
  - Summer (DST): UTC-6 (MDT)
- Area code: 505
- FIPS code: 35-63168
- GNIS feature ID: 2409174

Rio en Medio is a census-designated place (CDP) in Santa Fe County, New Mexico, United States. It is part of the Santa Fe, New Mexico Metropolitan Statistical Area. As of the 2020 census, Rio en Medio had a population of 157.

== Geography ==
According to the United States Census Bureau, the CDP has a total area of 0.4 square miles (1.0 km^{2}), all land.

== Demographics ==
Historical population
Census	Pop.	Note	%±
2020	157		—
U.S. Decennial Census

As of the 2000 census, there were 131 people, 40 households, and 31 families residing in the CDP. The population density was 297.1 inhabitants per square mile (114.7/km^{2}). There were 43 housing units at an average density of 97.5 per square mile (37.6/km^{2}). The racial makeup of the CDP was 43.51% White, 7.63% African American, 6.87% Native American, 2.29% Asian, 25.19% from other races, and 14.50% from two or more races. Hispanic or Latino of any race were 77.86% of the population.

There were 40 households, out of which 32.5% had children under the age of 18 living with them, 52.5% were married couples living together, 17.5% had a female householder with no husband present, and 22.5% were non-families. 12.5% of all households were made up of individuals, and none had someone living alone who was 65 years of age or older. The average household size was 3.28 and the average family size was 3.74.

In the CDP, the population was spread out, with 29.0% under the age of 18, 8.4% from 18 to 24, 29.0% from 25 to 44, 26.0% from 45 to 64, and 7.6% who were 65 years of age or older. The median age was 35 years. For every 100 females, there were 98.5 males. For every 100 females age 18 and over, there were 93.8 males.

The median income for a household in the CDP was $32,143, and the median income for a family was $32,143. Males had a median income of $0 versus $15,536 for females. The per capita income for the CDP was $9,723. None of the population and none of the families were below the poverty line.

== Education ==
It is within Santa Fe Public Schools.
