= Agua Fria, New Mexico =

- CDP
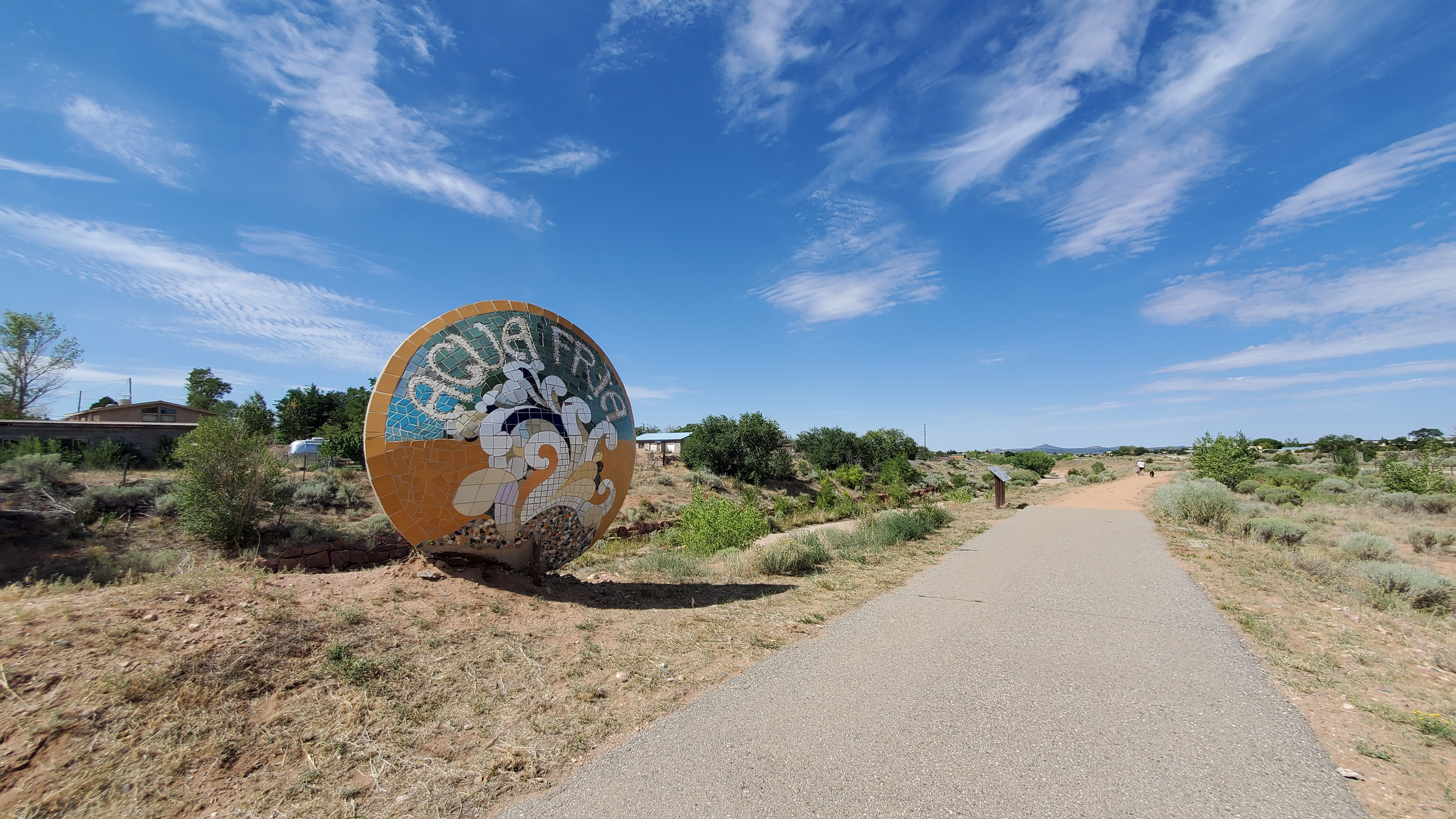

- Location of Agua Fria, New Mexico

- Location in the United States
- Coordinates: 35°39′45″N 106°00′25″W
- Country: United States
- State: New Mexico
- County: Santa Fe

Area
  - Total: 2.42 sq mi (6.28 km^{2})
  - Land: 2.42 sq mi (6.28 km^{2})
  - Water: 0 sq mi (0.00 km^{2})
- Elevation: 6,614 ft (2,016 m)

Population (2020)
  - Total: 2,913
  - Density: 1,200/sq mi (464/km^{2})
- Time zone: UTC-7 (Mountain (MST))
  - Summer (DST): UTC-6 (MDT)
- Postal code: 87507
- Area code: 505
- FIPS code: 35-01220
- GNIS feature ID: 2407699

Agua Fria (Spanish for "cold water") is a census-designated place (CDP) in Santa Fe County, New Mexico, United States. It is part of the Santa Fe, New Mexico Metropolitan Statistical Area. As of the 2020 census, Agua Fria had a population of 2,913. Agua Fria Village is a "Traditional Historic Community" (THC) as designated by the Santa Fe Board of County Commissioners in 1995 and subsequent Santa Fe County Ordinance #1996-16, as allowed by State Statute (3-7-1.1 and 3-2-3 (C) NMSA 1978).

== History ==
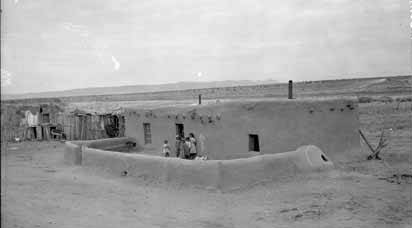
House in Agua Fria, circa 1900

Native Americans lived in this area circa 3,000-3,500 BCE because of the water availability and moderate temperatures (about 30 fewer freezing days than in Santa Fe). Recent archaeological work shows a presence in this area back to 7,000 BCE.

The Spanish under command of Juan de Oñate passed through this area on the way to founding the first capital of New Mexico San Gabriel in 1598 (near present-day Ohkay Owingeh). The first recorded settlement was circa 1640 by the grandparents of Major Roque Madrid (the area then known as Pueblo Quemado for a burnt native town in the area). The grandfather Francisco de Madrid may have 'dropped off' from a 1603 expedition to farm this area (he is the namesake of Madrid, New Mexico, a mining area).

As these settlements of Cieneguitas, Agua Fria and Cieneguilla expanded in Spanish Colonial New Mexico, they were called Ranchitos, as the population grew they became a Placita. Agua Fria was identified by two groups. The area by the Church was “La Placita de Los Romeros” and the other one in the area of the Tanque, the “watering hole” (area of Lopez Lane and Camino de Oro Road) became “La Placita de Los Lopez.” As the community grew, it acquired the status of a Village.

In the year 1776, Fray Francisco Atanacio Dominguez gave a census count to his superiors listing Agua Fria with 57 families and 297 persons; but at this time it was still known as Pueblo Quemado.

U.S. Army Colonel John M. Washington's Expedition to Navajo Country passed through Agua Fria on August 16, 1849. This was the first known American reference to the community. The parroquia of Santa Fe was administered under the auspices of the Diocese of Durango, Mexico in the 1800s. Even though the people in Agua Fria had a strong faith, they found it difficult to attend church regularly, so they founded their own mission in the Village in 1835.

== Geography ==
The traditional boundaries of the Village are from Camino Carlos Rael (west boundary of Frenchy's Field Park) on the east to San Felipe Road on the west (rejected Cienguilla Grant boundary), to Arroyo de los Chamisos on the south (present day Santa Fe Place Mall), to Arroyo de los Frijoles on the north (the arroyo is a City of Santa Fe walking trail, but it might be described as Las Companas subdivision, just north of State Road 599). The present-day THC boundaries are much smaller (basically Siler Road on east, Lopez Lane and Jemez Road on west, Rufina Street on south, and State Road 599 on north).

According to the United States Census Bureau, the CDP has a total area of 2.6 square miles (6.7 km^{2}), of which 2.5 square miles (6.5 km^{2}) is land and 0.1 square miles (0.26 km^{2}) (3.8%) is water.

== Demographics ==
Historical population
Census	Pop.	Note	%±
2000	2,051		—
2010	2,800		36.5%
2020	2,913		4.0%
U.S. Decennial Census

=== 2020 census ===
As of the 2020 census, Agua Fria had a population of 2,913. The median age was 40.0 years. 23.0% of residents were under the age of 18 and 16.0% of residents were 65 years of age or older. For every 100 females there were 92.9 males, and for every 100 females age 18 and over there were 93.4 males age 18 and over.

98.8% of residents lived in urban areas, while 1.2% lived in rural areas.

There were 1,149 households in Agua Fria, of which 29.2% had children under the age of 18 living in them. Of all households, 33.7% were married-couple households, 25.5% were households with a male householder and no spouse or partner present, and 31.9% were households with a female householder and no spouse or partner present. About 34.6% of all households were made up of individuals and 15.2% had someone living alone who was 65 years of age or older.

There were 1,223 housing units, of which 6.1% were vacant. The homeowner vacancy rate was 0.6% and the rental vacancy rate was 4.3%.

Racial composition as of the 2020 census
Race	Number	Percent
White	1,152	39.5%
Black or African American	13	0.4%
American Indian and Alaska Native	69	2.4%
Asian	20	0.7%
Native Hawaiian and Other Pacific Islander	1	0.0%
Some other race	797	27.4%
Two or more races	861	29.6%
Hispanic or Latino (of any race)	2,270	77.9%

=== 2010 census ===
In the Santa Fe CCD #92820, Agua Fria is the 01220 CDP. The 2010 Census had 2,865 people in Census Tract 1203 and included a larger area. This represented a growth of 15.6% over the 2000 Census. This included Block Group 1 with 1,201 people, Block Group 2 with 555 people, and Block Group 3 with 505 people. In the CDP 2,081 were classified as White and 637 as Other Race. Hispanics were 2,176; males 1439, females 1426. Under 18 years of age were 819 individuals; 20-24 were 213 individuals; 25-34 were 439 individuals; 35-49 were 595 individuals; 50-64 were 507 individuals; and 65 and over were 216 individuals. There were 1,027 houses with 966 occupied.

=== 2000 census ===
As of the census of 2000, there were 2,051 people, 721 households, and 508 families residing in the CDP. The population density was 1,048.7 inhabitants per square mile (404.9/km^{2}). There were 760 housing units at an average density of 388.6 per square mile (150.0/km^{2}). The racial makeup of the CDP was 64.31% White, 0.59% African American, 1.66% Native American, 0.24% Asian, 0.10% Pacific Islander, 28.47% from other races, and 4.63% from two or more races. Hispanic or Latino of any race were 79.23% of the population.

There were 721 households, out of which 41.9% had children under the age of 18 living with them, 47.2% were married couples living together, 14.7% had a female householder with no husband present, and 29.5% were non-families. 20.9% of all households were made up of individuals, and 5.0% had someone living alone who was 65 years of age or older. The average household size was 2.84 and the average family size was 3.29.

In the Census Designated Place (CDP) the population was spread out, with 29.6% under the age of 18, 9.8% from 18 to 24, 34.7% from 25 to 44, 19.3% from 45 to 64, and 6.7% who were 65 years of age or older. The median age was 31 years. For every 100 females, there were 107.2 males. For every 100 females age 18 and over, there were 106.9 males. The median income for a household in the CDP was $32,978, and the median income for a family was $33,456. Males had a median income of $25,539 versus $25,565 for females. The per capita income for the CDP was $14,023. About 21.5% of families and 22.8% of the population were below the poverty line, including 25.7% of those under age 18 and 35.0% of those age 65 or over.

== Education ==
It is within Santa Fe Public Schools.

== Notable people ==
- George Abrán Gonzales (1938–2015) – mayor of Santa Fe, New Mexico and radio broadcaster

== See also ==
- List of census-designated places in New Mexico
