= Cañada de los Alamos, New Mexico =

- CDP
- Location of Cañada de los Alamos, New Mexico

- Location in the United States
- Coordinates: 35°35′40″N 105°52′12″W
- Country: United States
- State: New Mexico
- County: Santa Fe

Area
  - Total: 3.68 sq mi (9.53 km^{2})
  - Land: 3.68 sq mi (9.53 km^{2})
  - Water: 0 sq mi (0.00 km^{2})
- Elevation: 7,523 ft (2,293 m)

Population (2020)
  - Total: 421
  - Density: 114.4/sq mi (44.18/km^{2})
- Time zone: UTC-7 (Mountain (MST))
  - Summer (DST): UTC-6 (MDT)
- ZIP code: 87501
- Area code: 505
- FIPS code: 35-10470
- GNIS feature ID: 2407951

Cañada de los Alamos is a census-designated place (CDP) in Santa Fe County, New Mexico, United States. It is part of the Santa Fe, New Mexico Metropolitan Statistical Area. As of the 2020 census, Cañada de los Alamos had a population of 421.

== Geography ==
The CDP is located approximately 7.5-mile (12.1 km) southeast of Santa Fe on County Road 67, Old Santa Fe Trail.

According to the United States Census Bureau, the CDP has a total area of 3.7 square miles (9.6 km^{2}), all land.

== Demographics ==
Historical population
Census	Pop.	Note	%±
2020	421		—
U.S. Decennial Census

As of the census of 2000, there were 358 people, 153 households, and 91 families residing in the CDP. The population density was 128.0 inhabitants per square mile (49.4/km^{2}). There were 165 housing units at an average density of 59.0 per square mile (22.8/km^{2}). The racial makeup of the CDP was 71.79% White, 1.96% Native American, 0.28% Asian, 20.39% from other races, and 5.59% from two or more races. Hispanic or Latino of any race were 44.69% of the population.

There were 153 households, out of which 31.4% had children under the age of 18 living with them, 43.8% were married couples living together, 8.5% had a female householder with no husband present, and 40.5% were non-families. 30.1% of all households were made up of individuals, and 6.5% had someone living alone who was 65 years of age or older. The average household size was 2.34 and the average family size was 2.97.

In the CDP, the population was spread out, with 25.1% under the age of 18, 5.0% from 18 to 24, 26.0% from 25 to 44, 36.0% from 45 to 64, and 7.8% who were 65 years of age or older. The median age was 41 years. For every 100 females there were 117.0 males. For every 100 females age 18 and over, there were 114.4 males.

The median income for a household in the CDP was $44,231, and the median income for a family was $50,682. Males had a median income of $11,250 versus $43,077 for females. The per capita income for the CDP was $25,707. About 11.4% of families and 20.9% of the population were below the poverty line, including 13.5% of those under age 18 and none of those age 65 or over.

== Education ==
It is within Santa Fe Public Schools.

== See also ==
- List of census-designated places in New Mexico
