= Madrid, New Mexico =

- CDP
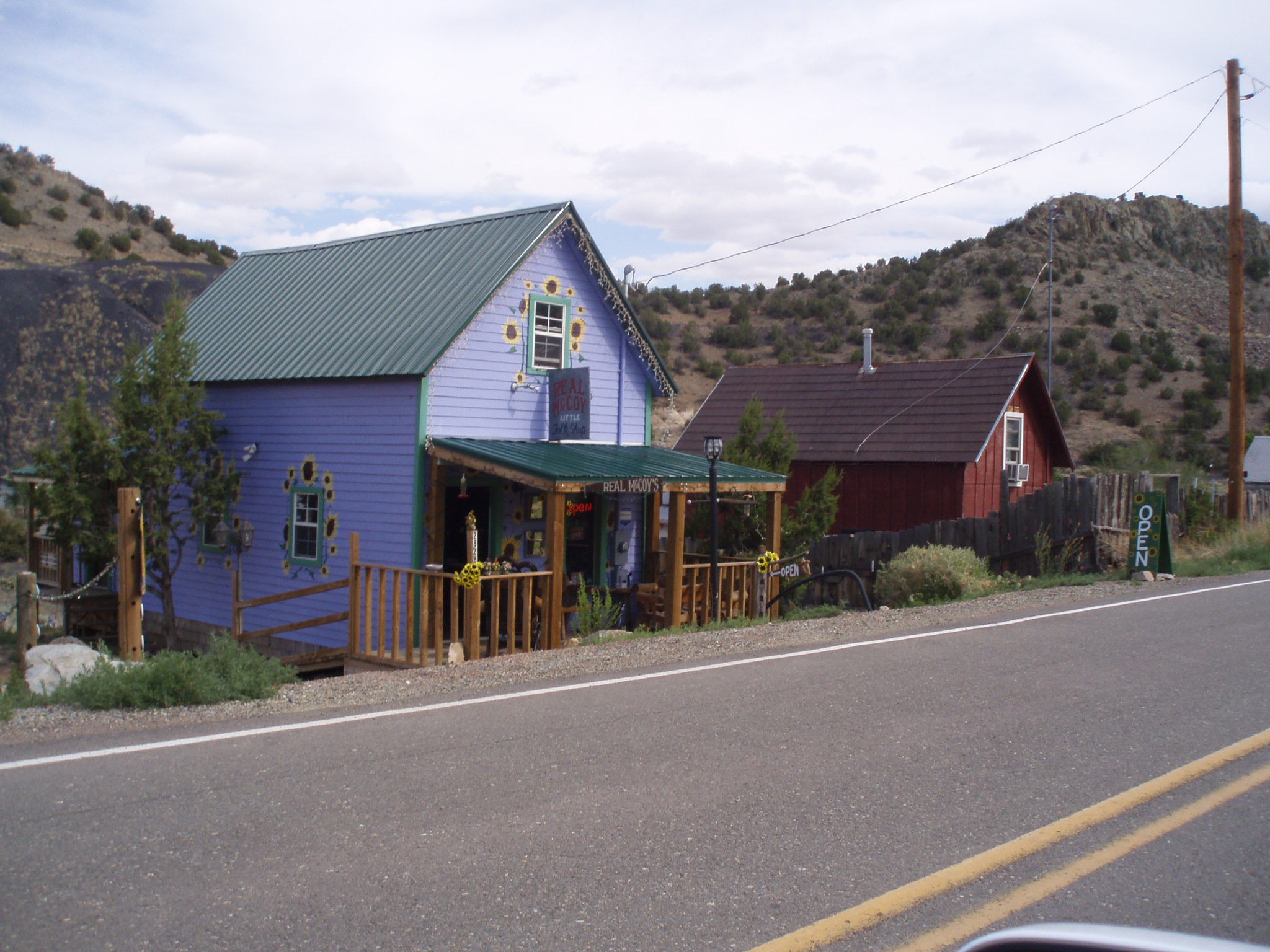
- Old miners' cabins remodeled into shops

- Location of Madrid, New Mexico

- Location in the United States
- Coordinates: 35°24′12″N 106°09′14″W
- Country: United States
- State: New Mexico
- County: Santa Fe

Area
  - Total: 1.39 sq mi (3.60 km^{2})
  - Land: 1.39 sq mi (3.60 km^{2})
  - Water: 0 sq mi (0.00 km^{2})
- Elevation: 6,122 ft (1,866 m)

Population (2020)
  - Total: 247
  - Density: 177.6/sq mi (68.59/km^{2})
- Time zone: UTC-7 (Mountain (MST))
  - Summer (DST): UTC-6 (MDT)
- ZIP code: 87010
- Area code: 505
- FIPS code: 35-46100
- GNIS feature ID: 2408159

Madrid (/ˈmædrɪd/ MAD-rid, Spanish: [maˈðɾið]) is a census-designated place (CDP) in Santa Fe County, New Mexico, United States. It is part of the Santa Fe, New Mexico Metropolitan Statistical Area. As of the 2020 census, Madrid had a population of 247. Today, Madrid has become an artists' community with galleries lining New Mexico State Road 14 (the Turquoise Trail). It retains remnants of its history with the Mineshaft Tavern and the Coal Mine Museum.

== History ==
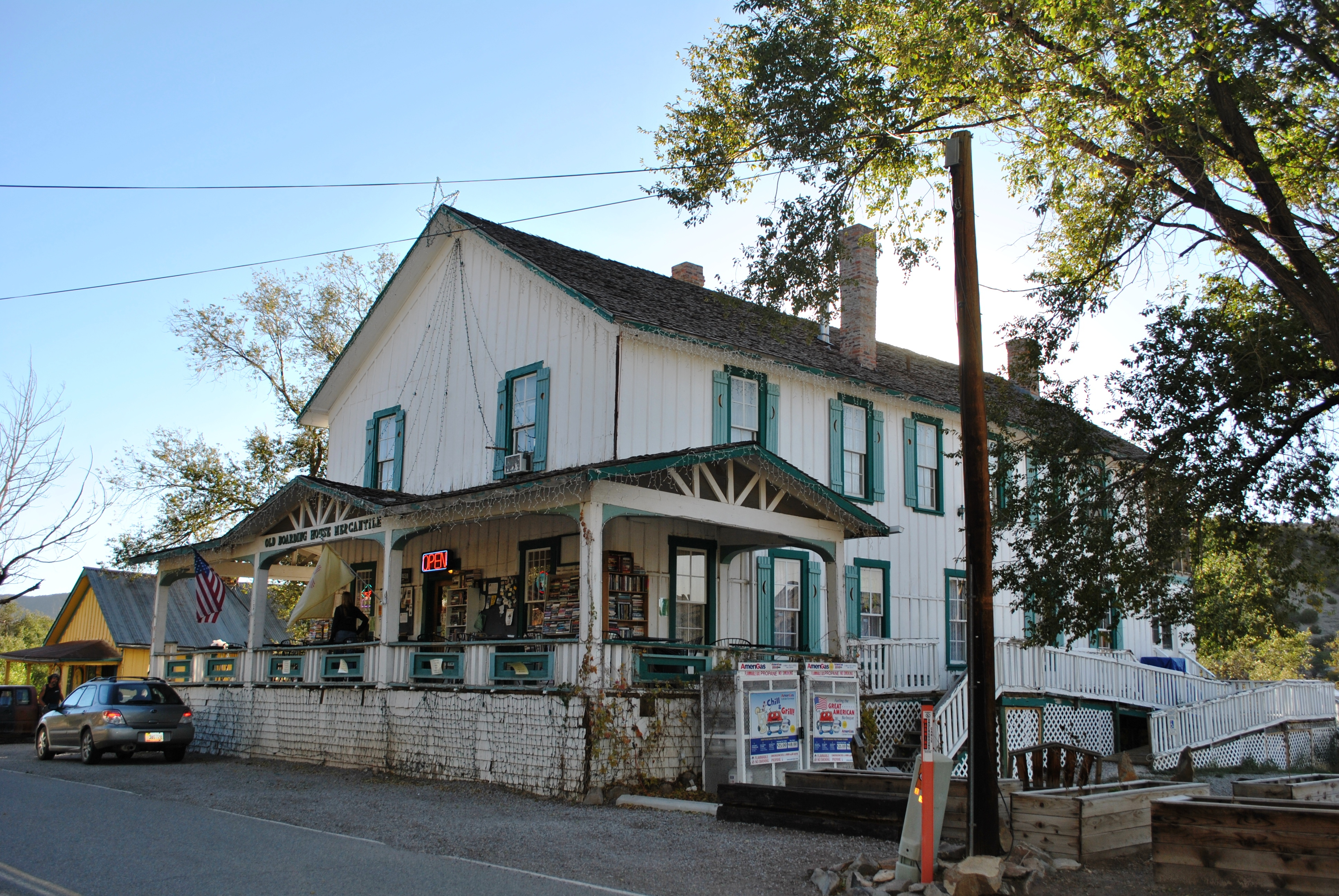
The Old Boarding House Mercantile, restored and still in operation

=== Beginnings ===
Lead mines in the area around Madrid captured the interest of Roque Madrid in the 17th century. It is unclear whether the current name of the community comes from that of earlier residents or the capital of Spain. The dominant English pronunciation of the name differs from that of the Spanish capital, with emphasis on the first syllable: MAD-rid. Coal mining began in the area around 1835.

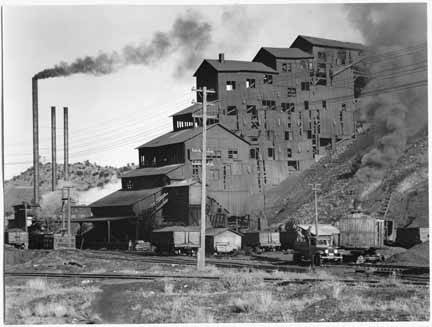
Anthracite coal breaker and power house buildings, Madrid, circa 1935. Anthracite coal was preferred for passenger trains, as it burned cleaner.

The coal deposits were called the Cerrillos Coal Bank following the arrival in early 1880 of the New Mexico & Southern Pacific Railroad (as the AT&SF in New Mexico was organized), named after the nearby mining and railroad town of Cerrillos Station. After a dozen years at the Coal Bank of wildcat, unpermitted, and unorganized mining the AT&SF acquired the property on December 10, 1891, and through purposefully-created subsidiaries solidified its control. The Cerrillos Coal & Iron Co. developed the layout for the town, mines, and facilities, and the Cerrillos Coal Railroad Co. built the 6.25 mi (10.06 km) standard gauge spur from the AT&SF main line at Waldo Junction.

In late August 1892, the spur finally terminated at the relatively new mining camp of Keeseeville (an illegal trespass settlement, however one whose 20-acre plat had been approved by Santa Fe County). At the site of Keeseeville, which the Cerrillos Coal Railroad co-opted, the town of Madrid was built. More accurately the Cerrillos Coal Railroad transported-in, section by section, prefabricated wooden miner's cabins from as far away as Topeka, Kansas; there were insufficient carpenters and suppliers in the region to provide the instant infrastructure that was needed for the town.

Madrid celebrated its "founding" in 1895. Since the town was for the next 80 years wholly owned by a series of corporations, the town itself was never incorporated. In the late 1940s, the demand for coal withered: Natural gas gradually replaced coal as the preferred home-heating fuel, and the AT&SF was replacing its coal-fired steam locomotives with diesel-electrics. By 1954 the Albuquerque and Cerrillos Coal Company ceased to operate and most of the residents moved away. The railroad spur was removed shortly thereafter.

=== Madrid Miners semi-pro baseball team ===
The Miners were started by the Madrid Employees Club and won many pennants. The Oscar Huber Ballpark was the first lighted ballpark west of the Mississippi in the 1920s.

== Geography ==
According to the United States Census Bureau, the CDP has a total area of 1.4 square miles (3.6 km^{2}), all land.

== Environmental issues ==
Black "gob piles" of accumulated spoil, the waste rock removed during coal mining, cover the hillsides and stain the red earth in the arroyo that runs between rows of Madrid's historic miners' cabins. These visible traces of the past bring money from tourists and filmmakers to the town, but they also create difficulty for many of the residents as rains cause abandoned mine drainage to flow down the hills in rivulets, covering roads and driveways, and flooding backyards, crawlspaces, and basements. The Abandoned Mine Land (AML) Reclamation Program has worked with residents to create some barricades to redirect the water flowing down the hills without removing or covering the coal piles that are a historic resource to the town. Residents disagree on what else should be done.

== Demographics ==
Historical population
Census	Pop.	Note	%±
2020	247		—
U.S. Decennial Census

As of the 2010 census, there were 204 people, 134 households, and 33 families residing in the CDP. The population density was 146 inhabitants per square mile (56/km^{2}). There were 167 housing units at an average density of 119 per square mile (46/km^{2}). The racial makeup of the CDP was 96.1% White, 0% African American, 0% Native American, 0.5% from other races, and 2.9% from two or more races. Hispanic or Latino of any race were 3.4% of the population.

There were 134 households, out of which 9.0% had children under the age of 18 living with them, 13.4% were married couples living together, 6.0% had a male householder with no wife present, 5.2% had a female householder with no husband present, and 75.4% were non-families. 64.2% of all households were made up of individuals, and 11.9% had someone living alone who was 65 years of age or older. The average household size was 1.52 and the average family size was 2.33.

In the CDP, the population was spread out, with 7.4% under the age of 18, 6.9% from 18 to 24, 30.5% from 25 to 44, 45.6% from 45 to 64, and 9.8% who were 65 years of age or older. The median age was 47.6 years. For every 100 females, there were 102 males. For every 100 females age 18 and over, there were 107.7 males.

According to the 2016 American Community Survey, the median income for a household in the CDP was $32,813. The per capita income for the CDP was $28,675. 20.5% of the population was living below the poverty line, including no under eighteens and 37.1% of those over 65.

== Education ==
It is within Santa Fe Public Schools.

It is zoned to Amy Biehl Elementary School, Milagro Middle School, and Santa Fe High School.

Previously it was zoned to Capital High School. In 2017 the district recommended changing the boundary of the area to Santa Fe High.

== In popular culture ==
=== Film ===
The ending of the film Wild Hogs (2007) was set and filmed in the town.

=== Literature ===
Belinda Vasquez Garcia's novel, The Witch Narratives: Reincarnation (2012), is set in Madrid during the 1920s and 1930s when Madrid was a company-owned coal-mining town.

Madrid and details about the town's attractions are mentioned in chapter 15 of A.J. DeWall's novel, Forever Man (2014).

=== Television ===
In the opening scene of Breaking Bad ("Ozymandias"), Walter White takes a break after his first methamphetamine cook to call his wife, Skyler, to suggest the family do something the show's creator (Vince Gilligan) says he and his girlfriend did, "head up to Turquoise Trail and stop at Tinkertown, maybe grab some lunch in Madrid".

In the A&E series Longmire, the interior scenes at the Red Pony Bar were filmed at The Mine Shaft Tavern in Madrid.

== Notable people ==
- Mae Marsh, actress
- Daniel Quinn, author
