= Valle Vista, New Mexico =

- Census-designated place
- Location within New Mexico Location within the United States
- Coordinates: 35°35′2″N 106°03′30″W
- Country: United States
- State: New Mexico
- County: Santa Fe

Area
  - Total: 0.27 sq mi (0.69 km^{2})
  - Land: 0.27 sq mi (0.69 km^{2})
  - Water: 0 sq mi (0.00 km^{2})
- Elevation: 6,277 ft (1,913 m)

Population (2020)
  - Total: 928
  - Density: 3,460/sq mi (1,336.1/km^{2})
- Time zone: UTC-7 (Mountain (MST))
  - Summer (DST): UTC-6 (MDT)
- ZIP Code: 87508 (Santa Fe)
- Area code: 505
- FIPS code: 35-82332
- GNIS feature ID: 2806778

Valle Vista is an unincorporated community and census-designated place (CDP) in Santa Fe County, New Mexico, United States. It was first listed as a CDP prior to the 2020 census. As of the 2020 census, Valle Vista had a population of 928.

The CDP is in central Santa Fe County, 10 miles (16 km) southwest of downtown Santa Fe, the state capital. It is bordered to the east by New Mexico State Road 14, and Interstate 25 passes just to the northwest of the community, with access from Exit 276 (State Road 599/Veterans Memorial Highway). State Road 14 leads south-southwest 44 miles (71 km) to Interstate 40 at Tijeras, while I-25 leads southwest 52 miles (84 km) to Albuquerque and east 71 miles (114 km) to Las Vegas, New Mexico.

== Demographics ==
Historical population
Census	Pop.	Note	%±
2020	928		—
U.S. Decennial Census

== Education ==
It is within Santa Fe Public Schools.
