= Peak Place, New Mexico =

- Unincorporated community
- Location within New Mexico
- Coordinates: 35°47′28″N 105°56′36″W
- Country: United States
- State: New Mexico
- County: Santa Fe

Area
  - Total: 1.31 sq mi (3.38 km^{2})
  - Land: 1.31 sq mi (3.38 km^{2})
  - Water: 0 sq mi (0.00 km^{2})
- Elevation: 6,637 ft (2,023 m)

Population (2020)
  - Total: 578
  - Density: 442.5/sq mi (170.85/km^{2})
- Time zone: UTC-7 (Mountain (MST))
  - Summer (DST): UTC-6 (MDT)
- Area code: 505
- GNIS feature ID: 2584174

Peak Place is an unincorporated community and census-designated place in Santa Fe County, New Mexico, United States. As of the 2020 census, Peak Place had a population of 578.

== Geography ==
According to the U.S. Census Bureau, the community has an area of 1.305 square miles (3.38 km^{2}), all land.

== Demographics ==
Historical population
Census	Pop.	Note	%±
2020	578		—
U.S. Decennial Census

== Education ==
Almost all of Peak Place is within Pojoaque Valley Public Schools while a small section is in Santa Fe Public Schools. Pojoaque Valley High School is the zoned school for Pojoaque Valley.
