= Chupadero, New Mexico =

- CDP
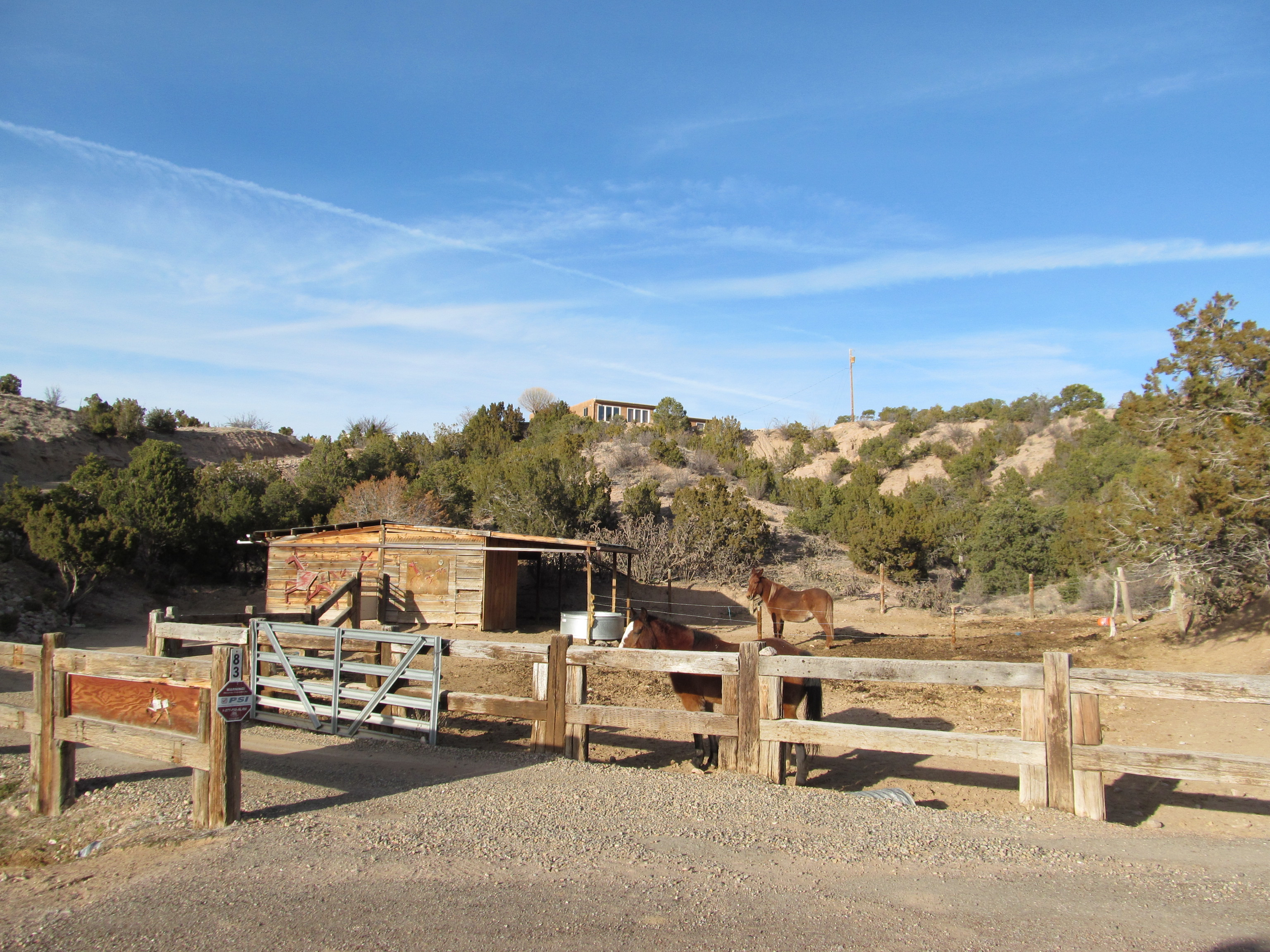
- Corral, Chupadero New Mexico

- Location of Chupadero, New Mexico

- Location in the United States
- Coordinates: 35°48′52″N 105°55′11″W
- Country: United States
- State: New Mexico
- County: Santa Fe

Area
  - Total: 1.81 sq mi (4.68 km^{2})
  - Land: 1.81 sq mi (4.68 km^{2})
  - Water: 0 sq mi (0.00 km^{2})
- Elevation: 6,946 ft (2,117 m)

Population (2020)
  - Total: 349
  - Density: 193/sq mi (74.6/km^{2})
- Time zone: UTC-7 (Mountain (MST))
  - Summer (DST): UTC-6 (MDT)
- ZIP code: 87501
- Area code: 505
- FIPS code: 35-15300
- GNIS feature ID: 2407617

Chupadero is a census-designated place (CDP) in Santa Fe County, New Mexico, United States. It is part of the Santa Fe, New Mexico Metropolitan Statistical Area. As of the 2020 census, Chupadero had a population of 349.

== Geography ==
According to the United States Census Bureau, the CDP has a total area of 1.8 square miles (4.7 km^{2}), all land.

== Demographics ==
Historical population
Census	Pop.	Note	%±
2020	349		—
U.S. Decennial Census

As of the census of 2000, there were 318 people, 125 households, and 93 families residing in the CDP. The population density was 219.8 inhabitants per square mile (84.9/km^{2}). There were 145 housing units at an average density of 100.2 per square mile (38.7/km^{2}). The racial makeup of the CDP was 64.15% White, 1.26% African American, 1.26% Native American, 0.31% Asian, 29.56% from other races, and 3.46% from two or more races. Hispanic or Latino of any race were 47.80% of the population.

There were 125 households, out of which 29.6% had children under the age of 18 living with them, 62.4% were married couples living together, 8.0% had a female householder with no husband present, and 24.8% were non-families. 15.2% of all households were made up of individuals, and 1.6% had someone living alone who was 65 years of age or older. The average household size was 2.54 and the average family size was 2.83.

In the CDP, the population was spread out, with 20.4% under the age of 18, 4.7% from 18 to 24, 29.2% from 25 to 44, 34.9% from 45 to 64, and 10.7% who were 65 years of age or older. The median age was 42 years. For every 100 females, there were 105.2 males. For every 100 females age 18 and over, there were 99.2 males.

The median income for a household in the CDP was $59,231, and the median income for a family was $58,077. Males had a median income of $60,833 versus $25,179 for females. The per capita income for the CDP was $26,915. About 22.1% of families and 12.1% of the population were below the poverty line, including none of those under age 18 and 25.0% of those age 65 or over.

== Education ==
It is within Santa Fe Public Schools.
