= Economy of New Mexico =

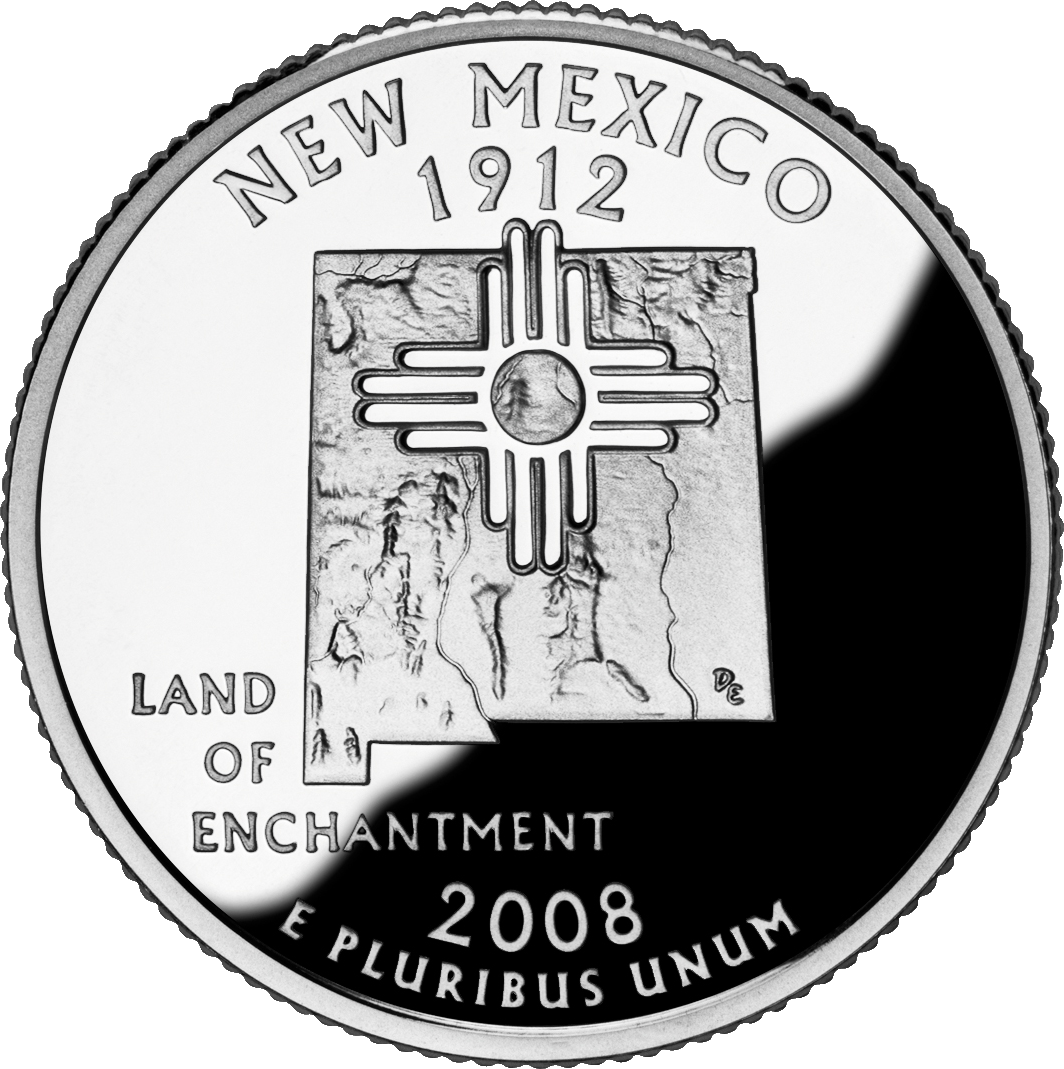

Statistics
- GDP: $94.2 billion
- GDP per capita: $39,811 (based on estimated 2017 population of 2,088,070)
- Population below national poverty line: 17.1%
- Gini coefficient: 0.453
- Labor force: 969,872 (September 2023)
- Unemployment: 3.6% (September 2023)

External
- Export goods: ADP machine parts (24.5%), processors and controllers (13.0%), medical equipment (4.6%)
- Main export partners: Mexico 59.5%; China 13.2%; South Korea 3.6%; Canada 3.6%

Public finance
- Revenue: $4,413.988 million
- Spending: $6,080 million

Oil and gas production, tourism, and federal government spending are important drivers of New Mexico's economy. The state government has an elaborate system of tax credits and technical assistance to promote job growth and business investment, especially in new technologies.

In 2017 New Mexico's gross domestic product was $94.2 billion.

In 2017 the per capita personal income was $39,811 (ranked 48th in the nation).

In 2008 the percentage of persons below the poverty level was 17.1%.

== Major industries and products ==
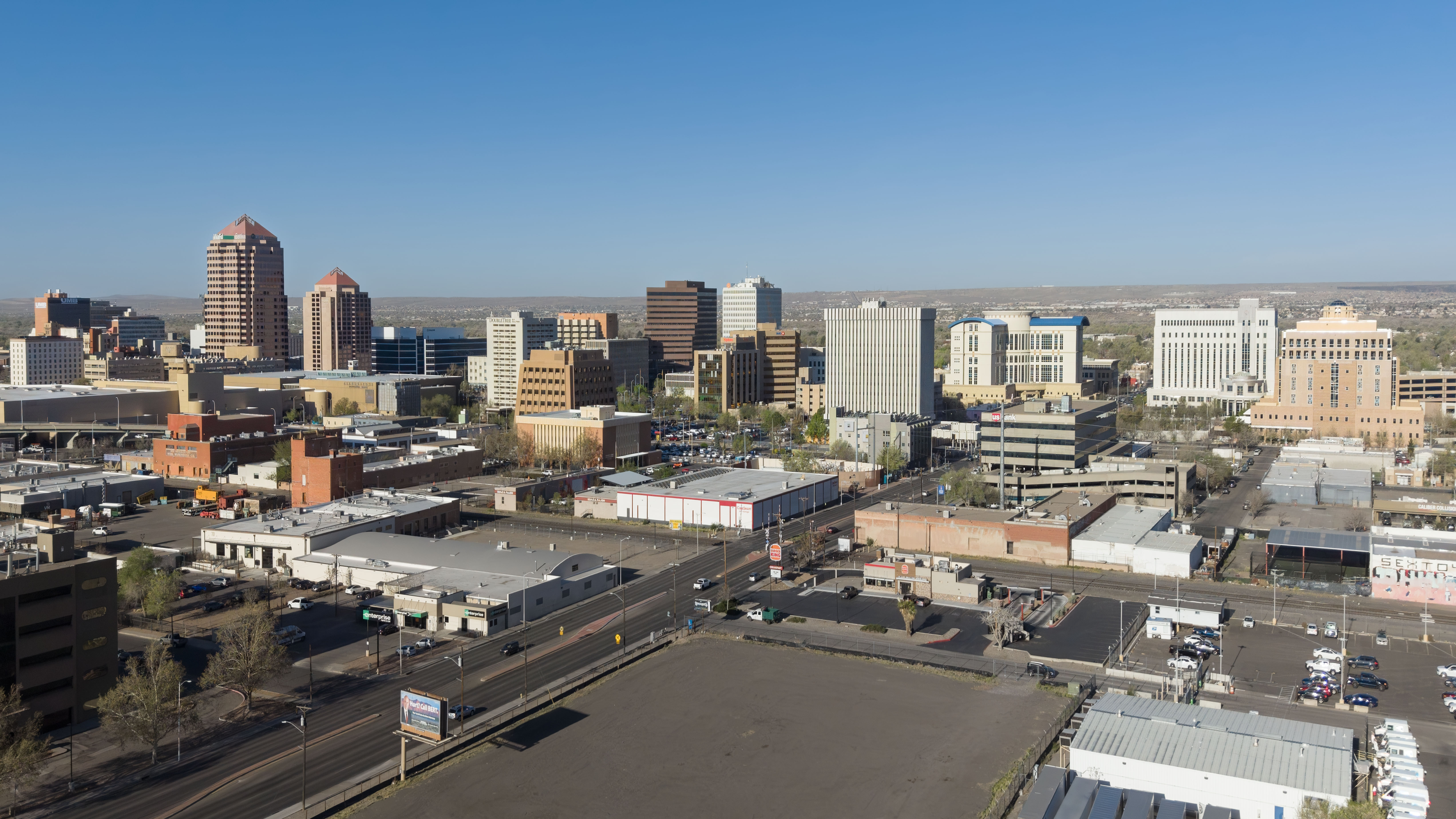
Downtown Albuquerque

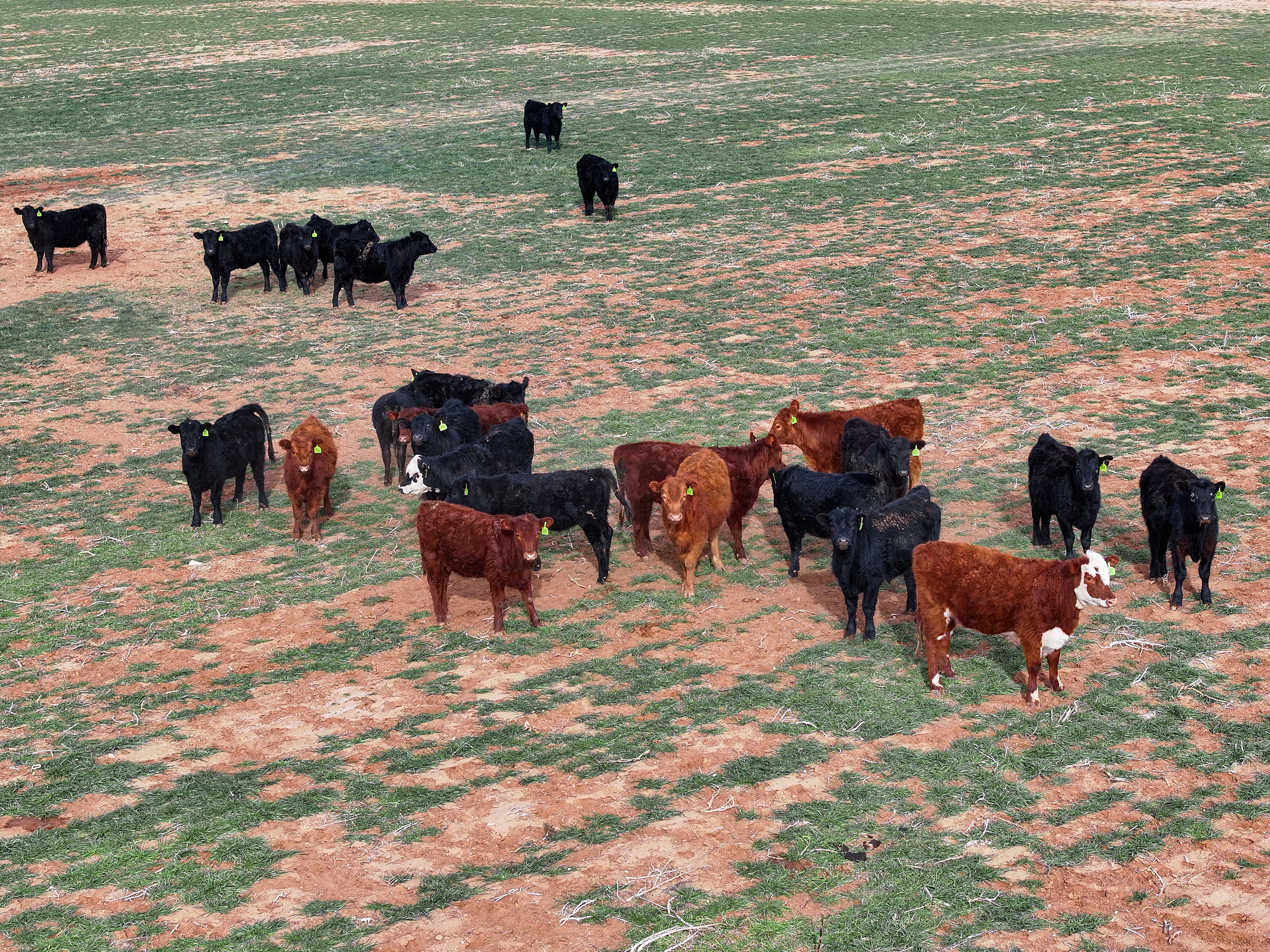
Cattle ranching near Portales, NM

New Mexico industries by 2004 taxable gross receipts (000s)
Retail trade	12,287,061
Construction	5,039,555
Other services (excluding Public Administration)	4,939,187
Professional, Scientific and Technology Services	3,708,527
Accommodation and Food Services	2,438,460
Wholesale Trade	2,146,066
Health Care and Social Assistance	1,897,471
Utilities	1,654,483
Mining and Oil and Gas Extraction	1,238,211
Manufacturing	926,372
Information and Cultural Industries	849,902
Unclassified Establishments	725,405
Real Estate and Rental and Leasing	544,739
Finance and Insurance	254,223
Transportation and Warehousing	221,457
Public Administration	159,013
Educational Services	125,649
Arts, Entertainment and Recreation	124,017
Admin and support, waste management and remediation	73,062
Agriculture, forestry, fishing and hunting	71,853
Management of companies and enterprises	48,714
Totals	39,473,429
_{Source: State of New Mexico Department of Labor}

=== Agriculture ===
Although much of its land is arid, New Mexico has hosted a variety of agricultural activities for at least 2,500 years, centered mostly on the Rio Grande and its tributaries. This is helped by its long history of acequias, along with other farming and ranching methods within New Mexico. It is regulated by the New Mexico Department of Agriculture, specialty areas include various cash crops, cattle ranching, farming, game and fish.

Agriculture contributes $40 billion to New Mexico's economy and employs nearly 260,000 people. As of 2023, the state exports $275 million in agricultural goods and ranks first nationwide in the production of chile peppers, second in pecans, and fifth in onions.

Cattle and dairy products top the list of major animal products of New Mexico. Cattle, sheep, and other livestock graze most of the arable land of the state throughout the year.

Limited, scientifically controlled dryland farming prospers alongside cattle ranching. Major crops include hay, nursery stock, pecans, and chile peppers. Hay and sorghum top the list of major dryland crops. Farmers also produce onions, potatoes, and dairy products. New Mexico specialty crops include piñon nuts, pinto beans, and chiles.

The Carlsbad and Fort Sumner reclamation projects on the Pecos River and the nearby Tucumcari project provide adequate water for limited irrigation in those areas of the desert and semiarid portions of the state where scant rainfall evaporates rapidly, generally leaving insufficient water supplies for large-scale irrigation. Located upstream of Las Cruces, the Elephant Butte Reservoir provides a major irrigation source for the extensive farming along the Rio Grande. Other irrigation projects use the Colorado River basin and the San Juan River.

Lumber mills in Albuquerque process pinewood, the chief commercial wood of the rich timber economy of Northern New Mexico.

The state vegetables are New Mexico chile peppers and pinto beans, with the former being the most famous and valuable crop. According to the 2017 Census of Agriculture, New Mexico ranked first in the nation for chile pepper acreage, with Doña Ana and Luna counties placing first and second among U.S. counties in this regard. New Mexico chile sold close to $40 million in 2021, while dry beans accounted for $7.6 million that year. New Mexico is one of the few states commercially producing pistachios, and its piñon harvest (pine nut) is a protected commodity.

Dairy is the state's largest commodity, with sales of milk alone totaling $1.3 billion. Dean Foods owns the Creamland brand in New Mexico, the brand was originally founded in 1937 to expand a cooperative dairy venture known as the Albuquerque Dairy Association. Southwest Cheese Company in Clovis is among the largest cheese production facilities in the United States.

Caballero history among the indigenous and Hispano communities in New Mexico have resulted in large-scale ranch lands throughout the state, most of which are within historically Apache, Navajo, Pueblo, and Spanish land grants. Wild game and fish found in the state include Rio Grande cutthroat trout, rainbow trout, crawdads, and venison.

Restaurant chains originating in the state include Blake's Lotaburger, Boba Tea Company, Dion's Pizza, Little Anita's, Mac's Steak in the Rough, and Twisters; many specialize in New Mexican cuisine. Some companies like Allsup's gas stations have consumer foods, like chimichangas.

=== Mining ===
New Mexicans derive much of their income from mineral extraction. Even before European exploration, Native Americans mined turquoise for making jewelry. After the Spanish introduced refined silver alloys they were incorporated into the Indian jewelry designs. New Mexico produces uranium ore (see Uranium mining in New Mexico), manganese ore, potash, salt, perlite, copper ore, beryllium, and tin concentrates.

=== Energy ===
New Mexico is the second largest crude oil and ninth largest natural gas producer in the United States; it overtook North Dakota in oil production in July 2021 and is expected to continue expanding. The Permian and San Juan Basins, which are located partly in New Mexico, account for some of these natural resources. In 2000 the value of oil and gas produced was $8.2 billion, and in 2006, New Mexico accounted for 3.4% of the crude oil, 8.5% of the dry natural gas, and 10.2% of the natural gas liquids produced in the United States. However, the boom in hydraulic fracturing and horizontal drilling since the mid-2010s led to a large increase in the production of crude oil from the Permian Basin and other U.S. sources; these developments allowed the United States to again become the world's largest producer of crude oil by 2018. New Mexico's oil and gas operations contribute to the state's above-average release of the greenhouse gas methane, including from a national methane hot spot in the Four Corners area. In common with other states in the Western U.S., New Mexico receives royalties from the sale of federally owned land to oil and gas companies. It has the highest proportion of federal land with oil and gas, as well as the most lucrative: since the last amendment to the U.S. Mineral Leasing Act in 1987, New Mexico had by far the lowest percent of land sold for the minimum statutory amount of $2 per acre, at just 3%; by contrast, all of Arizona's federal land was sold at the lowest rate, followed by Oregon at 98% and Nevada at 84%. The state had the fourth-highest total acreage sold to the oil and gas industry, at about 1.1 million acres, and the second-highest number of acres currently leased fossil fuel production, at 4.3 million acres, after Wyoming's 9.2 million acres; only 11 percent of these lands, or 474,121 acres, are idle, which is the lowest among Western states. Nevertheless, New Mexico has had recurring disputes and discussions with the U.S. government concerning management and revenue rights over federal land.

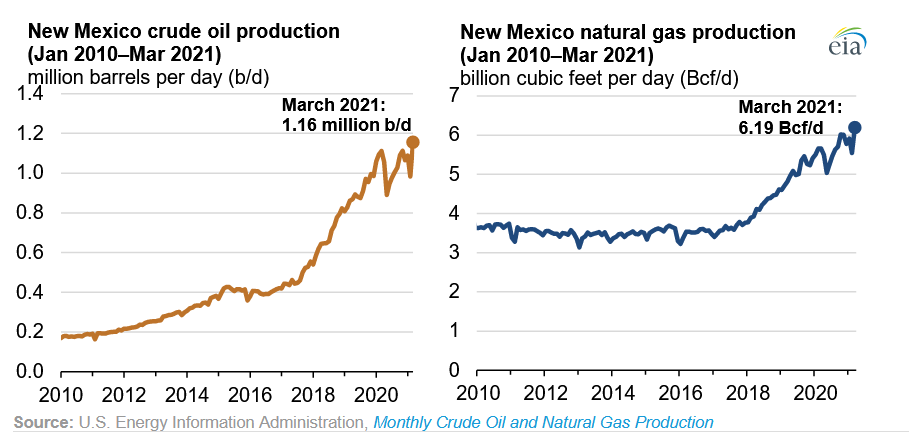
Oil and gas production in New Mexico, 2010–2021

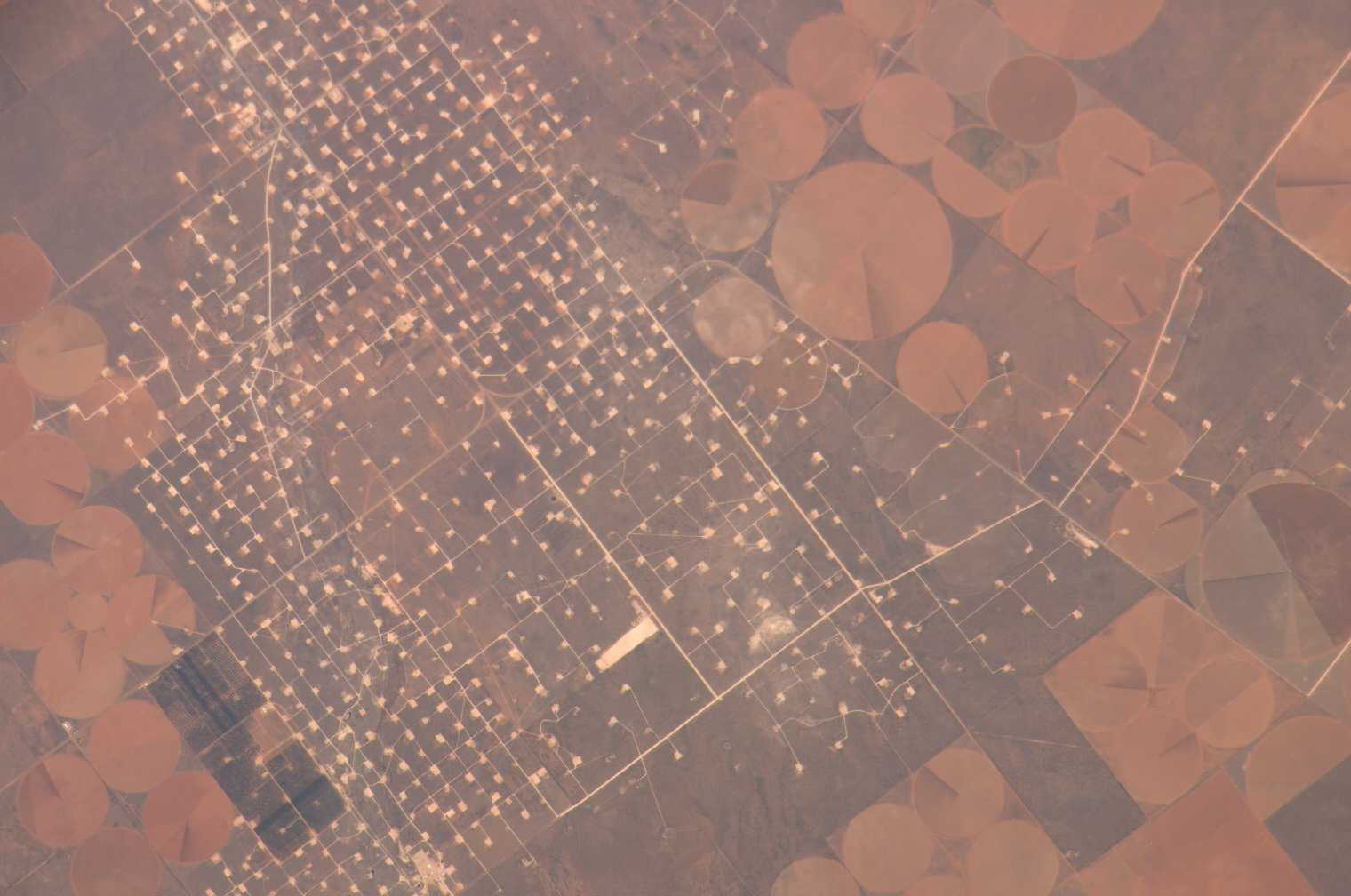
A New Mexico oil field, left, with crop circles on right, taken from the ISS in 2006

New Mexico is rich in fossil fuel and alternative energy resources. Major petroleum and natural gas deposits are located in the Permian Basin in southeast New Mexico and in the San Juan Basin in the northwest. The San Juan Basin Gas Area is the largest field of proved natural gas reserves in the United States. According to the Energy Information Administration, State crude oil output is typically just over 3 percent of the annual U.S. total, and natural gas output is nearly 10 percent of the U.S. total. New Mexico also contains major coal deposits in the northwest corner of the State. The boom in hydraulic fracturing and horizontal drilling beginning in the mid-2010s led to a large increase in the production of crude oil from the Permian Basin and other U.S. sources; these developments allowed the United States to again become the world's largest producer of crude oil, in 2018. New Mexico's oil and gas operations contribute to the state's above-average release of the greenhouse gas methane, including from a national methane hot spot in the Four Corners area. Nine tenths of electricity production in the State is from coal-fired plants. Much of New Mexico's geologically active Rocky Mountain region holds geothermal power potential, and pockets of the State are suitable for wind power development. New Mexico's southern deserts offer the State's most concentrated solar power potential.

The Waste Isolation Pilot Plant (WIPP) is located in the Delaware Basin, and is used to store nuclear waste.

New Mexico wind generation (GWh, million kWh)
Year	Total	Jan	Feb	Mar	Apr	May	Jun	Jul	Aug	Sept	Oct	Nov	Dec
2009	1,547	142	149	163	145	108	90	94	123	95	163	133	140
2010	1,832	156	94	168	199	193	139	102	120	136	144	182	199
2011	2,089	183	186	210	248	235	203	118	92	113	159	196	145
2012		219	213	220	193	194							

=== Manufacturing ===
Industrial output, centered around Albuquerque, includes electric equipment; petroleum and coal products; food processing; printing and publishing; and stone, glass, and clay products. Defense-related industries include ordnance. Important high-technology industries include lasers, data processing, solar energy and semiconductors.

=== Government and military ===
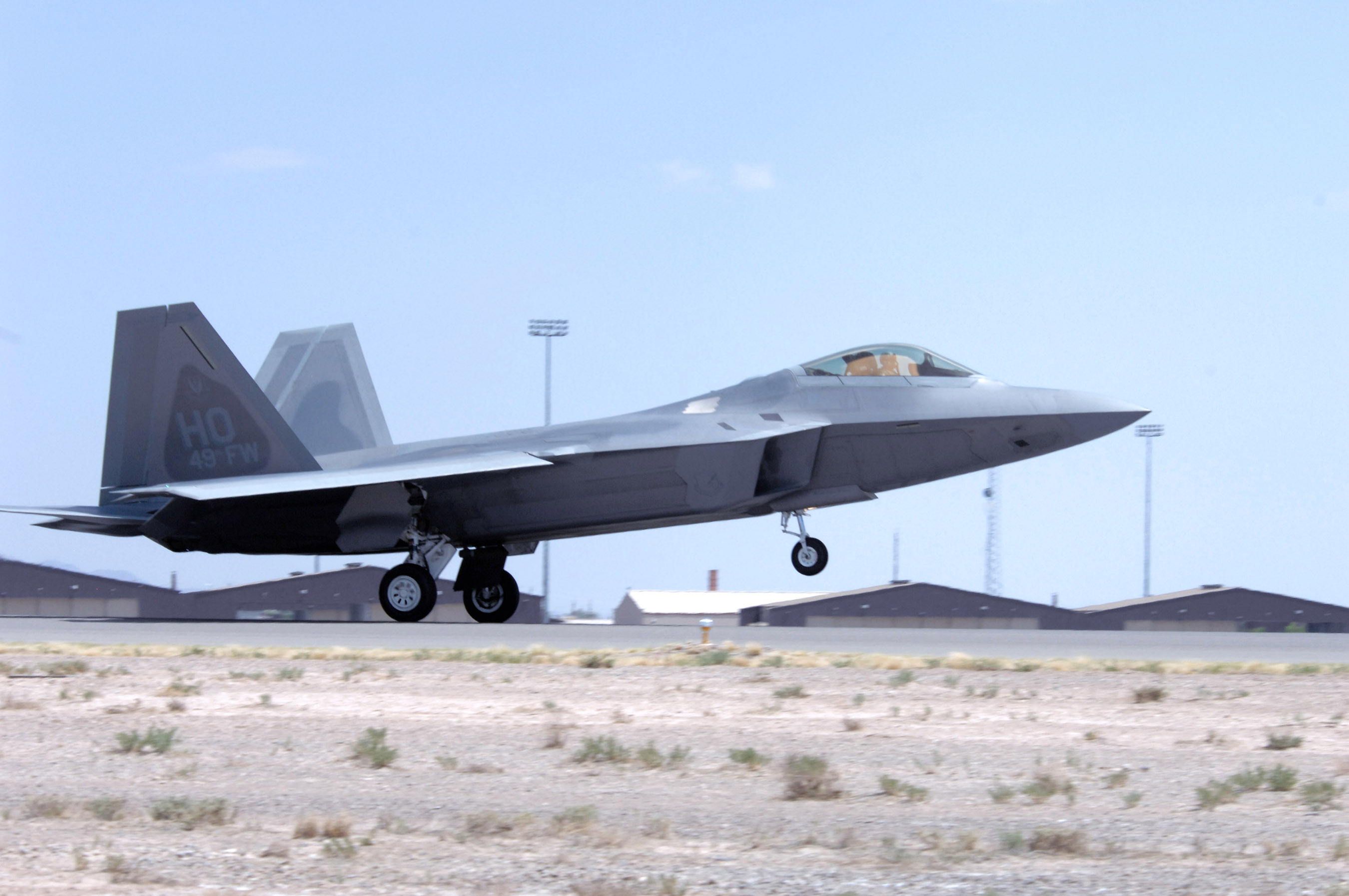
An F-22 Raptor flown by the 49th Fighter Wing at Holloman AFB

Federal government spending is a major driver of the New Mexico economy. In 2021, the federal government spent $2.48 on New Mexico for every dollar of tax revenue collected from the state, higher than every state except Kentucky. The same year, New Mexico received $9,624 per resident in federal services, or roughly $20 billion more than what the state pays in federal taxes. The state governor's office estimated that the federal government spends roughly $7.8 billion annually in services such as healthcare, infrastructure development, and public welfare.

Federal employees make up 3.4% of New Mexico's labor force. Many federal jobs in the state relate to the military: the state hosts three air force bases (Kirtland Air Force Base, Holloman Air Force Base, and Cannon Air Force Base); a testing range (White Sands Missile Range); and an army proving ground (Fort Bliss's McGregor Range). A 2005 study by New Mexico State University estimated that 11.7% of the state's total employment arises directly or indirectly from military spending. New Mexico is also home to two major federal research institutions: the Los Alamos National Laboratory and Sandia National Laboratories. The former alone accounts for 24,000 direct and indirect jobs and over $3 billion in annual federal investment as of 2019.

Federal government spending is a major driver of the New Mexico economy. In 2005 the federal government spent $2.03 on New Mexico for every dollar of tax revenue collected from the state. This rate of return is higher than any other state in the United States. The federal government is also a major employer in New Mexico providing more than a quarter of the state's jobs.

Many of the federal jobs relate to the military; the state hosts three air force bases (Kirtland Air Force Base, Holloman Air Force Base, and Cannon Air Force Base); a testing range (White Sands Missile Range); and an army proving ground and maneuver range (Fort Bliss – McGregor Range).

In addition to the National Guard, New Mexico has a New Mexico State Defense Force. Other minor locations include the New Mexico Army National Guard Headquarters in Santa Fe county and the National Guard Armory in far northern Rio Rancho in Sandoval county.

Other federal installations include national observatories and the technology labs of Los Alamos National Laboratory (LANL) and Sandia National Laboratories (SNL). SNL conducts electronic and industrial research on Kirtland AFB, on the southeast side of Albuquerque. These installations also include the missile and spacecraft proving grounds at White Sands. Other federal agencies such as the National Park Service, the United States Forest Service, and the United States Bureau of Land Management are a big part of the state's rural employment base.

=== Tourism and Retirement ===
New Mexico's distinctive culture, rich artistic scene, favorable climate, and diverse geography have long been major drivers of tourism. As early as 1880, the state was a major destination for travelers suffering from respiratory illnesses (particularly tuberculosis), with its altitude and aridity believed to be beneficial to the lungs. Since the mid aughts, New Mexico has seen a steady rise in annual visitors, welcoming a record-breaking 39.2 million tourists in 2021.

New Mexico's unique culinary scene has garnered increasing national attention, including numerous James Beard Foundation Awards. The state has been featured in major travel television shows such as Diners, Drive-Ins and Dives, Anthony Bourdain: Parts Unknown, Man v. Food Nation, and others. Outdoor recreation in the area is fueled by a variety of internationally recognized nature reserves, public parks, ski resorts, hiking trails, and hunting and fishing areas.

New Mexico's government is actively involved in promoting tourism, launching the nation's first state publication, New Mexico Magazine, in 1923. The New Mexico Tourism Department administers the magazine and is also responsible for the New Mexico True campaign.

Virgin Galactic, the first space tourism company to develop commercial flights into space, has decided to put its world headquarters and mission control at Spaceport America in Upham, New Mexico (25 miles (40 km) south of Truth or Consequences); Virgin Galactic had its inaugural launch of the VSS Enterprise spaceship in 2008, and has begun launching ordinary citizens since early 2009.

The New Mexico Tourism Department estimates that in fiscal year 2006 the travel industry in New Mexico generated expenditures of $6.5 billion.

The private service economy in urban New Mexico, especially in Albuquerque, has boomed in recent decades. Since the end of World War II, the city has gained an ever-growing number of retirees, especially among armed forces veterans and government workers. It is also increasingly gaining notice as a health-conscious community, and contains many hospitals and a high per capita number of massage and alternative therapists. The warm, semiarid climate has contributed to the exploding population of Albuquerque, attracting new industries to New Mexico. By contrast, many heavily Indigenous American and Hispanic rural communities remain economically underdeveloped.

=== Arts and entertainment ===
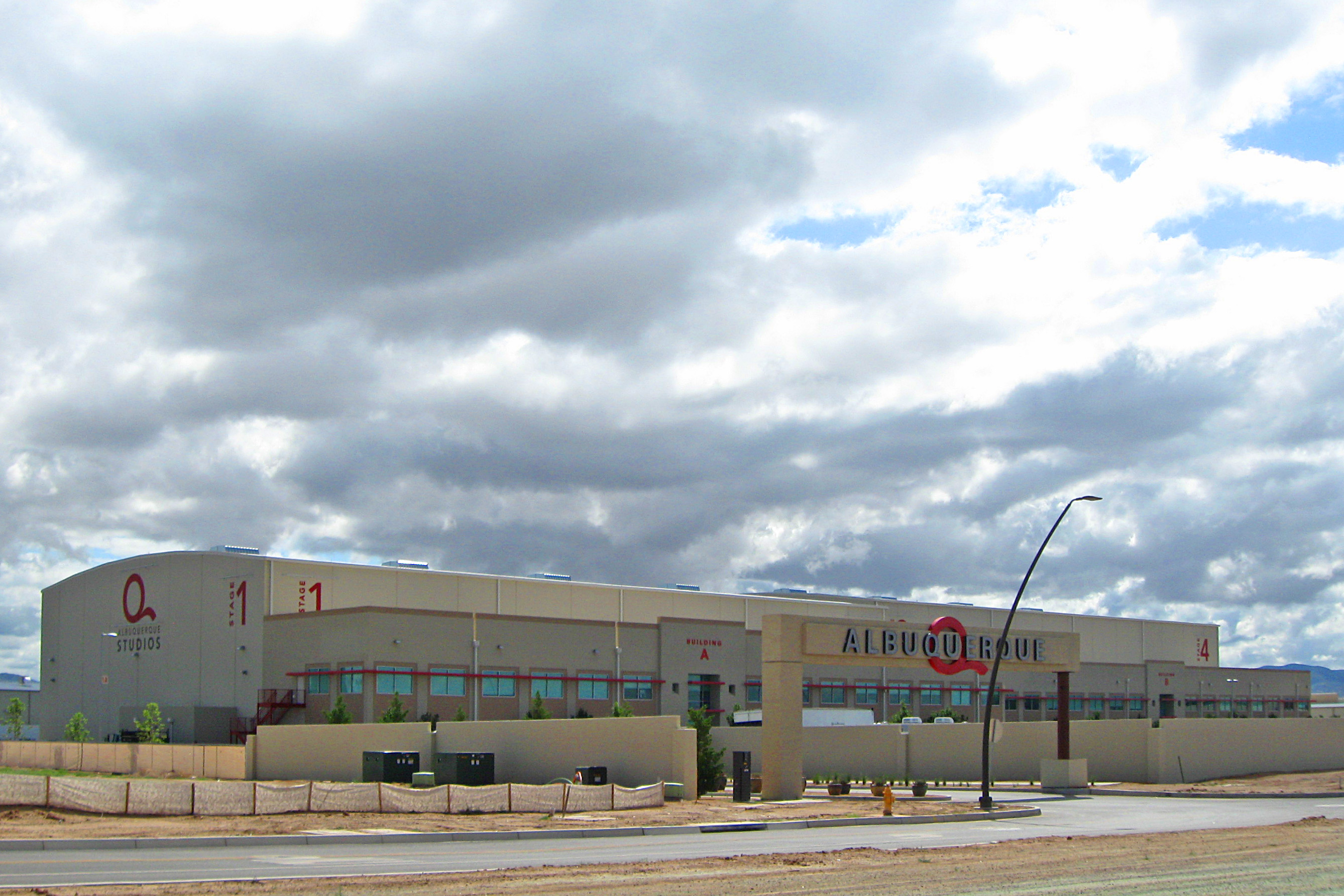
Albuquerque Studios, built in 2007 for the rising demand of film production in the state

Reflecting the artistic traditions of the American Southwest, New Mexican art has its origins in the folk arts of the indigenous and Hispanic peoples in the region. Pueblo pottery, Navajo rugs, and Hispano religious icons like kachinas and santos are recognized in the global art world. Georgia O'Keeffe's presence brought international attention to the Santa Fe art scene, and today the city has several notable art establishments and many commercial art galleries along Canyon Road. As the birthplace of William Hanna, and the residence of Chuck Jones, the state also connections to the animation industry.

New Mexico provides financial incentives for film production, including tax credits valued at 25–40% of eligible in-state spending. A program enacted in 2019 provides benefits to media companies that commit to investing in the state for at least a decade and that use local talent, crew, and businesses. According to the New Mexico Film Office, in 2022, film and television expenditures reached the highest recorded level at over $855 million, compared to $624 million the previous year. During fiscal years 2020–2023, the total direct economic impact from the film tax credit was $2.36 million. In 2018, Netflix chose New Mexico for its first U.S. production hub, pledging to spend over $1 billion over the next decade to create one of the largest film studios in North America at Albuquerque Studios. NBCUniversal followed suit in 2021 with the opening of its own television film studio in the city, committing to spend $500 million in direct production and employ 330 full-time equivalent local jobs over the next decade. Albuquerque is consistently recognized by MovieMaker magazine as one of the top "big cities" in North America to live and work as a filmmaker, and the only city to earn No. 1 for four consecutive years (2019–2022); in 2024, it placed second, after Toronto.

Country music record labels have a presence in the state, following the former success of Warner Western. During the 1950s to 1960s, Glen Campbell, The Champs, Johnny Duncan, Carolyn Hester, Al Hurricane, Waylon Jennings, Eddie Reeves, and JD Souther recorded on equipment by Norman Petty at Clovis. Norman Petty's recording studio was a part of the rock and roll and rockabilly movement of the 1950s, with the distinctive "Route 66 Rockabilly" stylings of Buddy Holly and The Fireballs. Albuquerque has been referred to as the "Chicano Nashville" due to the popularity of regional Mexican and Western music artists from the region. A heritage style of country music, called New Mexico music, is widely popular throughout the southwestern U.S.; outlets for these artists include the radio station KANW, Los 15 Grandes de Nuevo México music awards, and Al Hurricane Jr. hosted Hurricane Fest to honor his father's music legacy.

Feature films have used New Mexico as a location since The Indian School in 1898. Financial incentives and construction of facilities (such as The Albuquerque Studios) have created opportunities for locally based crew members with production reaching an all-time high in 2007. As of the end of August 2007, 30 major projects have been filmed in the state, more than in any other calendar year in history. The New Mexico Film Office assists the industry in coming to and filming in the state.

In 2011 the state placed a cap of $50 million on tax credits for the film industry. The cost of funding the incentive soared from just $3.4 million in 2004 to $76.7 million in 2009.

Meow Wolf, an artist collective that began in Santa Fe, has involved leading creatives such as George R. R. Martin and Matt King, and has expanded throughout the Southwest, including Colorado, Nevada, and Texas.

==== Facilities ====
Garson Studios is an established film production facility is on the campus of Santa Fe University of Art and Design that has helped turn out many feature-length films with its soundstage and high tech equipment.

Film and television post-production is also growing

=== Technology ===
New Mexico is part of the larger Rio Grande Technology Corridor, an emerging alternative to Silicon Valley consisting of clusters of science and technology institutions stretching from southwestern Colorado to the Gulf of Mexico. The constituent New Mexico Technology Corridor, centered primarily around Albuquerque, hosts a constellation of high technology and scientific research entities, which include federal facilities such as Sandia National Laboratories, Los Alamos National Laboratory, and the Very Large Array; private companies such as Intel, HP, and Facebook; and academic institutions such as the University of New Mexico (UNM), New Mexico State University (NMSU), and New Mexico Tech. Most of these entities form part of an "ecosystem" that links their researchers and resources with private capital, often through initiatives of local, state, and federal governments.

New Mexico has been a science and technology hub since at least the mid-20th century, following heavy federal government investment during the Second World War. Los Alamos was the site of Project Y, the laboratory responsible for designing and developing the world's first atomic bomb for the Manhattan Project. Horticulturist Fabián García developed several new varieties of peppers and other crops at what is now NMSU, which is also a leading space grant college. Robert H. Goddard, credited with ushering the space age, conducted many of his early rocketry tests in Roswell. Astronomer Clyde Tombaugh of Las Cruces discovered Pluto in neighboring Arizona. Personal computer company MITS, which was founded in Albuquerque in 1969, brought about the "microcomputer revolution" with the development of the first commercially successful microcomputer, the Altair 8800; two of its employees, Paul Allen and Bill Gates, later founded Microsoft in the city in 1975. Multinational technology company Intel, which has had operations in Rio Rancho since 1980, opened its Fab 9 factory in the city in January 2024, part of its commitment to invest $3.5 billion in expanding its operations in the state; it is the company's first high-volume semiconductor operation and the only U.S. factory producing the world's most advanced packaging solutions at scale.

The New Mexican government has aimed to develop the state into a major center for technology startups, namely through financial incentives and public-private partnerships. The bioscience sector has experienced particularly robust growth, beginning with the 2013 opening of a BioScience Center in Albuquerque, the state's first private incubator for biotechnology startups; New Mexicans have since founded roughly 150 bioscience companies, which have received more patents than any other sector. In 2017, New Mexico established the Bioscience Authority to foster local industry development; the following year, pharmaceutical company Curia built two large facilities in Albuquerque, and in 2022 announced plans to invest $100 million to expand local operations. The state is also positioning itself to play a leading role in developing quantum computing, quantum dot, and clean energy technologies; the New Mexico Quantum Moonshot initiative seeks to transform the state into a global leader in quantum technologies.

New Mexico's high altitude, generally clear skies, and sparse population have long fostered astronomical and aerospace activities, beginning with the ancient observatories of the Chaco Canyon culture; the "Space Triangle" between Roswell, Alamogordo, and Las Cruces has seen the highest concentration rocket tests and launches. New Mexico is sometimes considered the birthplace of the U.S. space program, beginning with Goddard's design of the first liquid fuel rocket in Roswell in the 1930s. The first rocket to reach space flew from White Sands Missile Range in 1948, and both NASA and the Department of Defense continue to develop and test rockets there and at the adjacent Holloman Air Force Base. New Mexico has also become a major center for private space flight, hosting the world's first purpose-built commercial spaceport, Spaceport America, which anchors several major aerospace companies and associated contractors, most notably Branson's Virgin Galactic.

In November 2022, the New Mexico State Investment Council, which manages that state's $38 billion sovereign wealth fund, announced it would commit $100 million towards America's Frontier Fund (AFF), a new venture capital firm that will focus on advanced technologies such as microelectronics and semiconductors, advanced manufacturing, artificial intelligence, new energy sources, synthetic biology and quantum sciences.

In 2023, the U.S. Department of Energy announced several projects in New Mexico pursuant to the CHIPS and Science Act, which aims to expands domestic semiconductor manufacturing, research and development of new technology, and workforce training; the projects, which will total roughly $8 million, include a new 100,000-square-foot technology incubator for companies, academia, and national laboratories, and a new platform for facilitating the development of tech startups among minority communities. In addition to the federal government, entrepreneurs Richard Branson and Elon Musk, among others, have been heavily investing in technology throughout the Rio Grande and Southwestern U.S.

==== Taxation ====
New Mexico's state income tax is the highest in the American Southwest outside California and higher than every state bordering it, ranging from 1.7% to a maximum of 5.9%. Yet in some contexts New Mexico has been described as a somewhat favorable state regarding corporate income. It does not levy taxes on inheritance, estate, or sales. Personal income tax rates range from 1.7% to 5.9% within five income brackets; the top marginal rate was increased from 4.9% in 2021 per a 2019 law. Active-duty military salaries are exempt from state income tax, as is income earned by Native American members of federally recognized tribes on tribal land.

New Mexico imposes a Gross Receipts Tax (GRT) on many transactions, which may even include some governmental receipts. This resembles a sales tax but, unlike the sales taxes in many states, it applies to services as well as tangible goods. Normally, the provider or seller passes the tax on to the purchaser; however, legal incidence and burden apply to the business, as an excise tax. GRT is imposed by the state and by some counties and municipalities. As of 2021, the combined tax rate ranged from 5.125% to 9.063%.

Property tax is imposed on real property by the state, by counties, and by school districts. In general, personal use personal property is not subject to property taxation. On the other hand, property tax is levied on most business-use personal property. The taxable value of property is one-third the assessed value. A tax rate of about 30 mills is applied to the taxable value, resulting in an effective tax rate of about 1%. In the 2005 tax year, the average millage was about 26.47 for residential property, and 29.80 for non-residential property. Assessed values of residences cannot be increased by more than 3% per year unless the residence is remodeled or sold. Property tax deductions are available for military veterans and heads of household.

A 2021 analysis by the nonprofit Tax Foundation placed New Mexico 23rd in business tax climate; its property taxes were found to be the least burdensome in the U.S., while taxation for unemployment insurance and on corporations each ranked as the ninth least burdensome.

Beginning in 2008, personal income tax rates for New Mexico range from 1.7% to 4.9%, within four income brackets. Beginning in 2007, active-duty military salaries are exempt from the state income tax.

New Mexico imposes a gross receipts tax on businesses. This resembles a sales tax but unlike the sales taxes in many states it applies to services as well as tangible goods. Normally the business passes the tax on to the purchaser. There is a tax imposed by the state and there may also be local taxes imposed by counties and cities. As of July 1, 2008, the combined tax rate ranged from 5.125% to 8.4375%.

Property tax is imposed on real property by the state, by counties, and by school districts. In general personal property is not taxed. The taxable value of property is 1/3 of the assessed value. A tax rate of about 30 mills is applied to the taxable value, resulting in an effective tax rate of about 1%. In the 2005 tax year the average millage was about 26.47 for residential property and 29.80 for non-residential property. Assessed values of residences cannot be increased by more than 3% per year unless the residence is remodeled or sold.

== Economic incentives ==
New Mexico provides a number of economic incentives to businesses operating in the state, including various types of tax credits and tax exemptions. Most of the incentives are based on job creation.

New Mexico law allows governments to provide land, buildings, and infrastructure to businesses to promote job creation. Several municipalities have imposed an economic development gross receipts tax (a form of municipal infrastructure GRT) that is used to pay for these infrastructure improvements and for marketing their areas.

The state provides financial incentives for film production. The New Mexico Film Office estimated at the end of 2007 that the incentive program had brought more than 85 film projects to the state since 2003 and had added $1.2 billion to the economy.

== Wealth and poverty ==
New Mexico is one of the poorest states in the U.S. and has long struggled with poverty. Its poverty rate of roughly 18% is among the highest in the country, exceeded only by Louisiana and Mississippi. In 2017, nearly 30% of New Mexico's children were in poverty, which is 40% higher than the national average. The majority of births (54%) were financed by Medicaid, a federal healthcare program for the poor, the third highest of any state. As of May 2021, around 44% of residents were enrolled in Medicaid.

New Mexico ranks 39th in the share of households with more than $1 million in wealth (5%), and among fourteen states without a Fortune 500 company. The state has a relatively high level of income disparity, with a Gini coefficient of 0.4769, albeit below the national average of 0.486. Household income is slightly less than $47,000, which is the fourth lowest in the U.S. The unemployment rate for June 2021 is 7.9%, tied with Connecticut as the highest in the country, and close to the peak of 8.0% for June–October 2010, following the 2008 financial crisis.

The New Mexico government has enacted several policies to address chronic poverty, including approving a minimum wage increase in January 2021 and requiring paid sick leave. The state's minimum wage of $10.50 is higher than that of the federal government and 34 other states; it is set to increase to $11.50 on January 1, 2022, and $12.00 on January 1, 2023. Additionally, counties and municipalities have set their own minimum wages; Santa Fe County enacted a "Living Wage Ordinance" on March 1, 2021, mandating $12.32.

The New Mexico Legislature is considering implementing a statewide guaranteed basic income program targeting poorer residents; if enacted, it would be only the second U.S. state after California with such a policy. In August 2021, Santa Fe announced a one-year pilot program that would provide a "stability stipend" of $400 monthly to 100 parents under the age of 30 who attend Santa Fe Community College; the results of the program will determine whether the state government follows suit with its own basic income proposals. Las Cruces, the state's second largest city, is officially discussing the enactment of a similar program. In November 2025, all New Mexico families became eligible for free child care – the first state to do so.

== Largest employers ==
- Northern
  - Santa Fe University of Art and Design
  - Boy Scouts of America
  - U.S. Bureau of Land Management (BLM)
  - Mesa Air Group
  - Navajo Nation
  - Los Alamos National Laboratory
  - Wal-Mart
  - New Mexico State Government
  - New Mexico Department of Transportation
  - Northern New Mexico College
- Central
  - PNM Resources and PNM Electric & Gas Services
  - Presbyterian Health Plan
  - Sandia National Laboratories
  - Intel
  - University of New Mexico
  - New Mexico State Government
  - Kirtland Air Force Base
- Eastern
  - Albertson's Supermarket
  - U.S. Postal Service
  - Wal-Mart
  - Navajo Refining Company
  - U.S. National Park Service (NPS)
  - Allsup's Convenience Stores
- Southwestern
  - Immigration and Naturalization Service (INS)
  - Lockheed Engineering and Sciences
  - New Mexico State University
  - Lovelace Healthcare
  - Pepsi Bottling
  - New Mexico Institute of Mining and Technology
  - U.S. Army (Fort Bliss)

_{Source: Economic Research & Analysis Bureau New Mexico Department of Labor}

== See also ==
- List of New Mexico counties by socioeconomic factors
