= St. Michael's High School =

Catholic school in New Mexico, United States

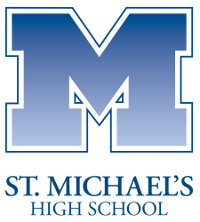

Location
- 100 Siringo Road; Santa Fe, New Mexico 87505; United States

Information
- Type: Private, coeducational high school
- Motto: Enter to learn, leave to serve.
- Established: 1859 (chartered 1874)
- President: Paul Weir, PhD
- Principal: Martin Sandoval
- Enrollment: 450 (7-12)
- Campus: Suburban, 25 acres (10 ha)
- Colors: Light navy & white
- Athletics conference: NMAA, AAA Dist. 2
- Mascot: Horsemen
- Rival: St. Pius X High School; Robertson High school School; Santa Fe High School
- Website: www.stmichaelssf.org

St. Michael's High School is a private Catholic junior/senior high school located in Santa Fe, New Mexico. It is privately run under the auspices of the international Institute of the Brothers of the Christian Schools, better known as the De La Salle Christian Brothers.

St. Michael's teaches grades 7 through 12 and has an enrollment of approximately 450 students. The school has a president/principal structure and is overseen by a board of trustees. The school operates on a semester schedule.

== History ==
St. Michael's High School was founded in 1859 as El Colegio de San Miguel in an adobe hut next to the San Miguel Mission on present-day Old Santa Fe Trail (formerly College Street), in what is now the Barrio De Analco Historic District. The school was established at the behest of Archbishop Jean-Baptiste Lamy, who had arrived in New Mexico in 1851 to find that formal education in the territory was almost nonexistent. After establishing the Loretto Academy for girls in 1852, Lamy recruited four De La Salle Christian Brothers from his native France to open a similar school for boys. Brothers Hilarien, Gondulph, Geramius and Galmier Joseph arrived on October 27, 1859, after two and a half months of travel by ship, train and covered wagon, and St. Michael's held its first classes shortly afterward.

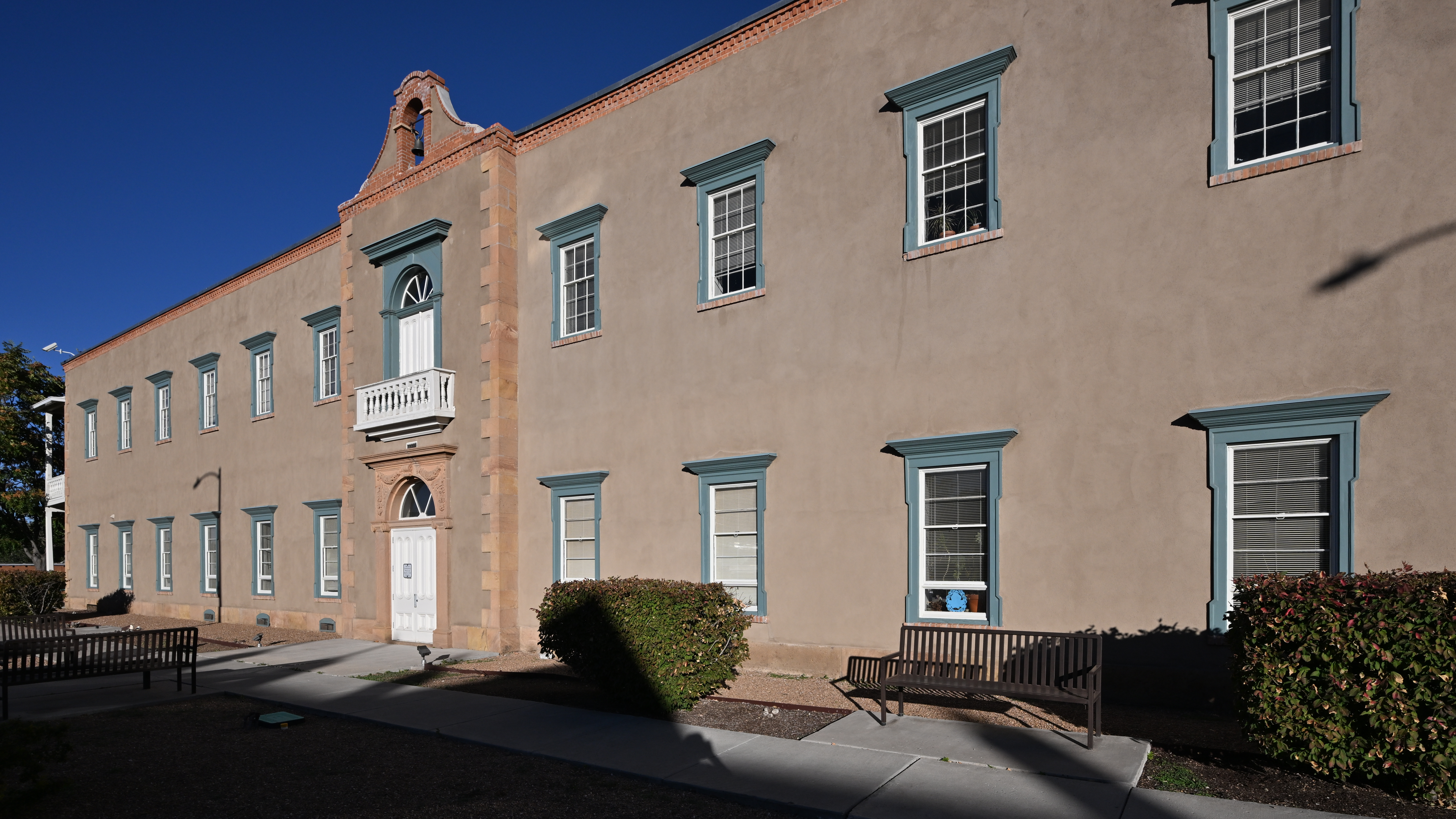
The 1878 Lamy Building was originally the main building of St. Michael's College

In 1870, the school nearly closed due to financial hardship and falling morale of the Brothers and students. Brother Peter J. Schneider, known as Brother Botulph, arrived to open a novitiate to train local student Brothers and recruit more Brothers to Santa Fe. Under Botulph, St. Michael's began offering high school diplomas, and later, teaching certificates. In 1874, the territorial legislature granted the school a charter as the College of the Christian Brothers of New Mexico. In 1876, St. Michael's conferred diplomas on its first graduates. In 1877, Brother Botulph started a fundraising campaign to construct the school's first permanent building, which still exists in modified form as the Lamy Building. Ground was broken on the building in April 1878 and it was ready for classes by November. In 1887 the school completed a second building, now known as the Lew Wallace Building.

In the early decades of the twentieth century, the St. Michael's science labs were remodeled, a gymnasium, financed by alumni donations, was constructed, and athletic teams began competing in New Mexico's interscholastic sports program. After World War I, the college phased out its post-secondary courses but continued to operate as a high school, while a new St. Michael's College was established at a separate campus in 1947. In 1926, a fire destroyed the wood-framed third story of the main building, which was then truncated at the second floor and used as a dormitory. To make up for the loss of space, a new building, Chavez Memorial Hall, was added in 1927.

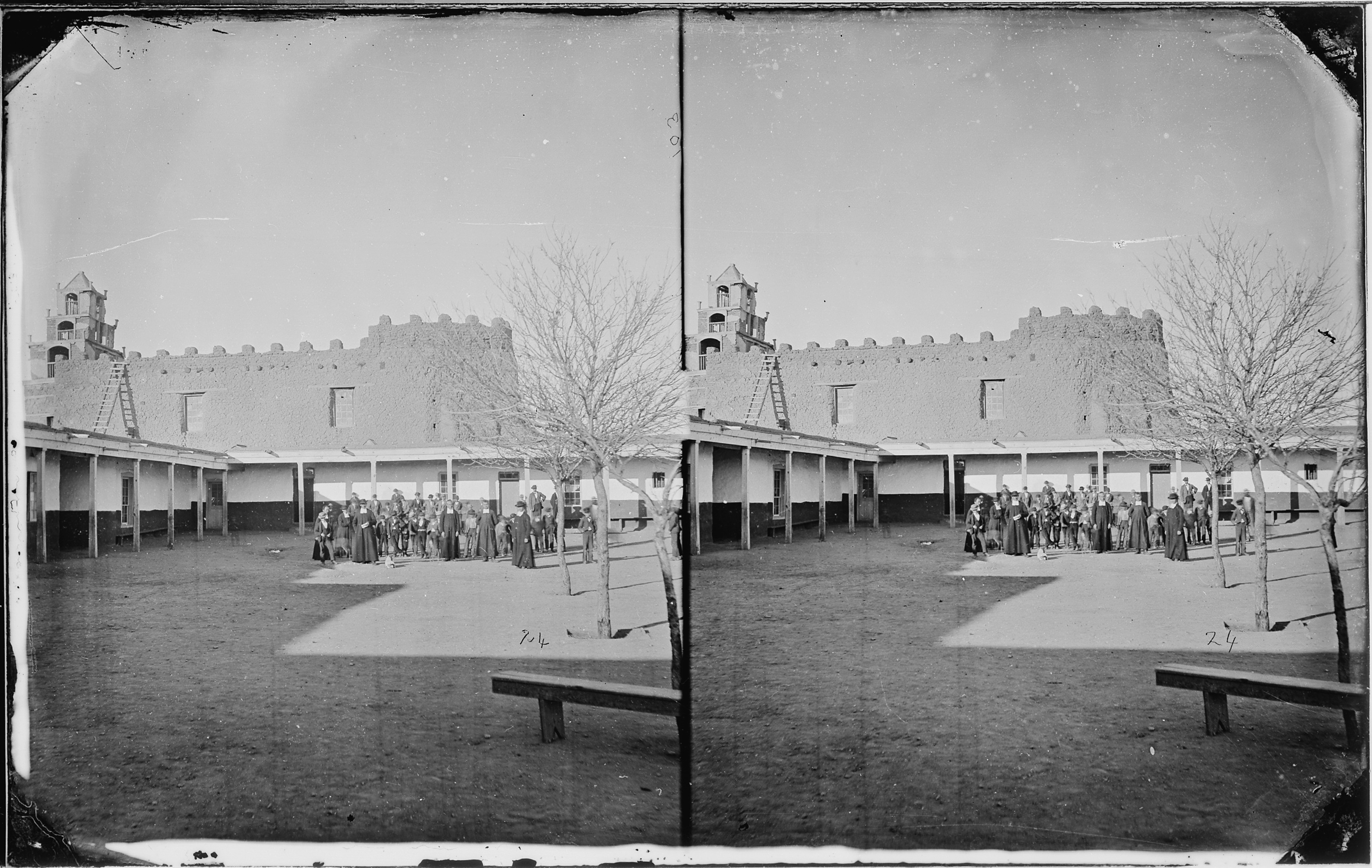
Stereogram of the school from 1873

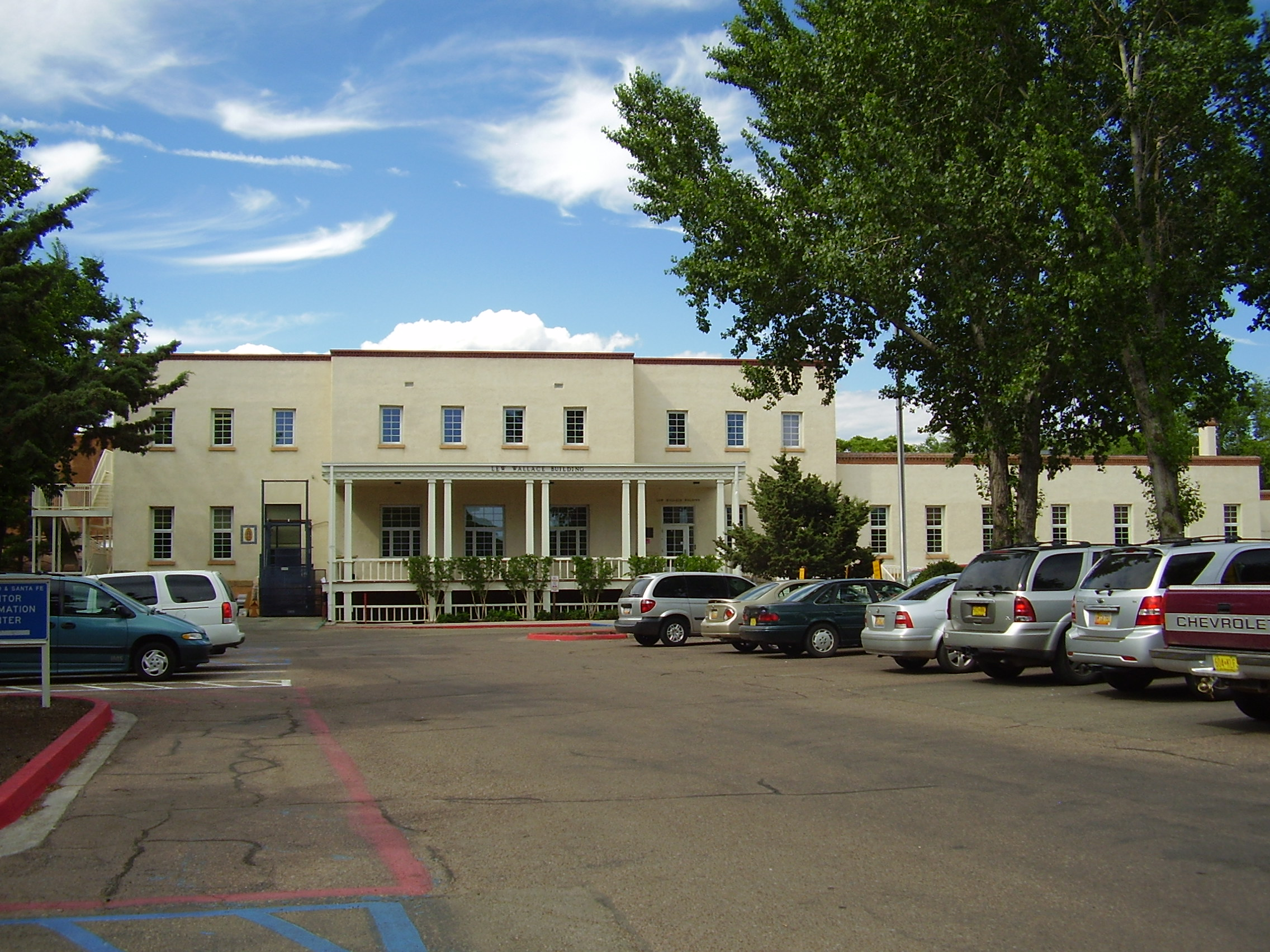
The Lew Wallace Building, built in 1887, is another surviving building from the old campus

In 1968 St. Michael's moved to its current location at 100 Siringo Road and became co-educational upon the closing of the Loretto Academy for Girls. It also became exclusively a day school; previously the high school took on boarders from New Mexico and other states. The original campus was sold to the State of New Mexico, which turned the two older buildings into government offices and demolished the other campus structures.

== Facilities ==
The school's campus covers 25 acres. St. Michael's is the owner of the San Miguel Mission, and of the De Vargas Street House.

== Athletics ==
St. Michael's athletic nicknames are the Horsemen and the Lady Horsemen. The school has won over 70 State Championships from NMAA sanctioned sports and events. St. Michael's competes in District 2AAA,.

State Championships	Class	Year:
Boys Cross Country	3A	2006, 2008
Girls Cross Country	3A	2005, 2006, 2007, 2008
Football	3A	1937, 1964, 1972, 2003, 2007, 2012, 2023, 2024, 2025
Volleyball	3A	2002
Boys Soccer	3A	2019
Girls Soccer	3A	1997, 2001, 2007, 2009, 2021, 2025
Wrestling	3A	1972, 1973, 1974, 1975, 1976, 2010, 2012, 2013
Boys Basketball	1A-3A	1940, 1942, 1967, 1968, 1969, 1999, 2002, 2003, 2006, 2007, 2012, 2023
Baseball	3A	2003, 2004
Boys Tennis	3A	1974, 1982, 1985
Boys Golf	3A	2009, 2010
Girls Golf	3A	2004, 2005, 2006
Girls Track & Field	3A	2004, 2005, 2006, 2007
Spirit-Dance Team	3A	1978, 1979, 1980, 1981, 1982, 1983, 1992, 1997, 1998, 1999, 2000, 2001, 2002, 2003, 2004, 2005, 2006, 2007, 2009, 2010, 2011, 2013
Cheer	3A	1982, 1986
Chess	3A	2006, 2012, 2014, 2015
Choral Arts Society (Choir)	3A	2017, 2019, 2023

== Notable alumni ==
- Ron Porterfield (1983), MLB athletic trainer
- Tom Ford, Fashion Designer and Film Director
- Marjorie Herrera Lewis, author
- Michelle Lujan Grisham, Governor of New Mexico
- Ally Walker (1979), Actress

== Notable faculty ==
- John Hamman
