= De Vargas Street House =

- Oldest House
- U.S. Historic district – Contributing property
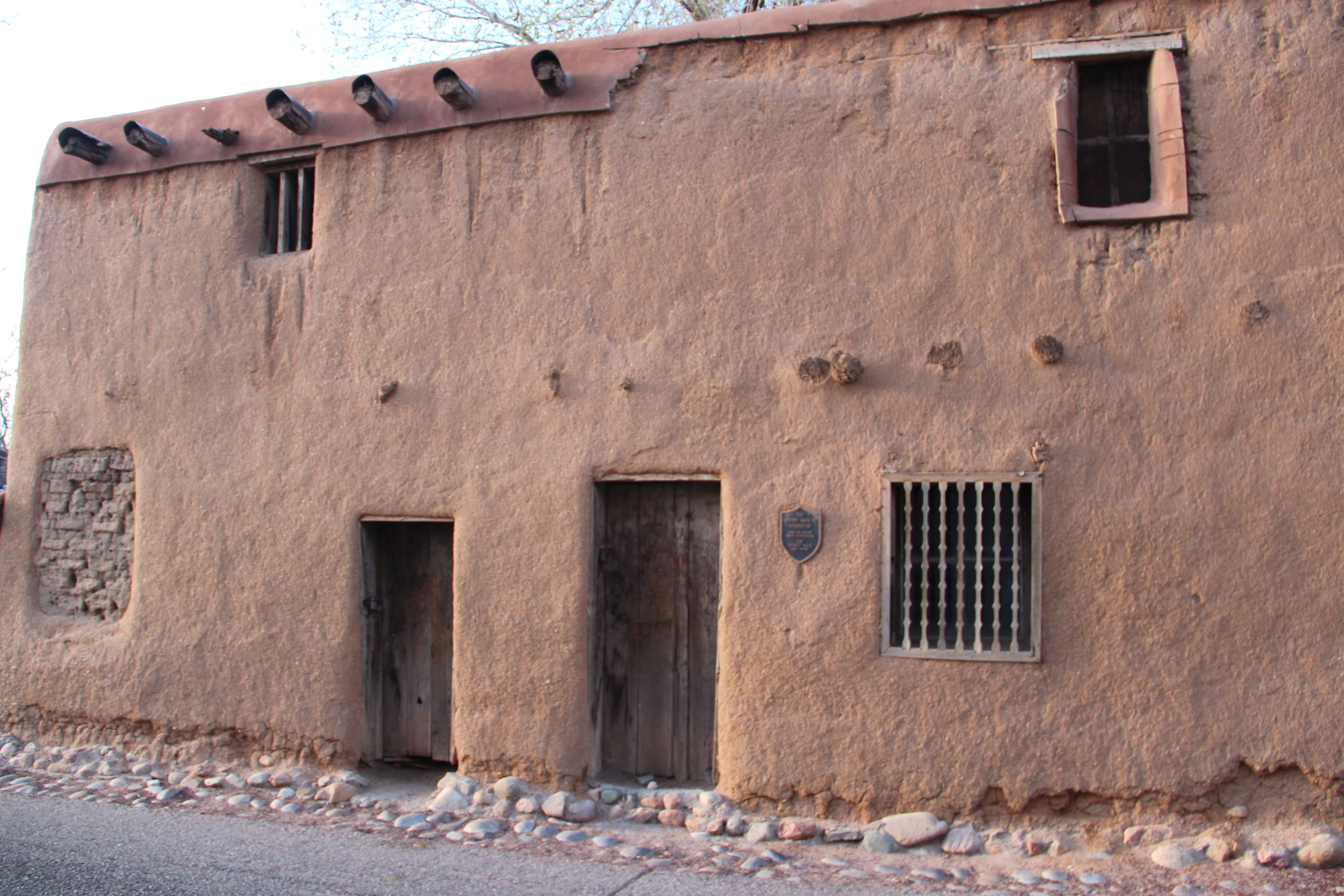
- The building in 2014

- Location within New Mexico Location within the United States
- Location: 215 East De Vargas St., Santa Fe, New Mexico
- Coordinates: 35°41′01″N 105°56′15″W
- Part of: Barrio De Analco Historic District (ID68000032)
- Designated CP: November 24, 1968

The De Vargas Street House, often referred to as the Oldest House, is a historic building in Santa Fe, New Mexico, which is often said to be one of the oldest buildings in United States. The original date of construction is unknown but the majority of the building is believed to date to the Spanish colonial period (post-1610). One archaeological study also concluded that some sections of the walls are characteristic of Pueblo architecture and may be pre-Spanish in origin. The building was listed on the National Register of Historic Places and New Mexico State Register of Cultural Properties in 1968 as a contributing property in the Barrio De Analco Historic District.

== History ==
The Barrio de Analco, across the Santa Fe River from the main settlement around Santa Fe Plaza, was established in the early 1600s by various working-class inhabitants, including some Tlaxcaltec people who had accompanied the Spanish settlers from Mexico. The name "Analco" came from the Nahuatl language, meaning "on the other side of the river". The nucleus of the settlement was the San Miguel Mission, built around 1620. According to noted archaeologist Edgar Lee Hewett, the Barrio de Analco stood on the site of an earlier pueblo, which he also called Analco:

The Tewa name for the site where Santa Fe now stands was 'Kuapoge'... and a large terraced pueblo stood on Fort Marcy hill where the military breastworks have long covered its ruined walls. A smaller pueblo, later called 'Analco'... stood south of the Rio Santa Fe, on the site of San Miguel church.

The construction date of the "Oldest House" is unknown, but local legend claimed that the building was part of the Analco pueblo and was already standing when Spanish colonists arrived. An article from 1903 reported that it had been a tourist attraction "for fifty years", and it was said to be the oldest house in the United States as early as 1879. Even at the time, many were skeptical of this claim. In 1904, Charles Fletcher Lummis wrote (referring to the Maria Josefa bell supposedly cast in 1355):

It ought not to be necessary to tell even kindergarten scholars that there are no bells in America cast in 1355... and that the whole thing is a fake of the same proportion as Prince's Tertio-millennial of Santa Fe; the "oldest house" and the "oldest church," and all the other notorious swindles which the territory has permitted some of its citizens to tack as a disgraceful tag upon her good name.

The Tertio-Millennial Exposition was held in 1883, implying Santa Fe had been founded in 1550, which was inaccurate by 60 years. The organizers of the event promoted local tourist attractions like the "Oldest House" with very little regard for historical veracity. Later operators of the Oldest House have continued to claim a construction date as early as 1200. In 1992, the manager of the property admitted, "We have done no archaeological research. It is as much a legend, one of Santa Fe's many legends... I'm perpetuating the legend." However, there may be at least an element of truth to the claim that part of the building is of Puebloan origin. In 1902, Hewett inspected the walls while they were being repaired and noted a few sections that were constructed from 'puddled' adobe, a building technique used by Puebloans before the Spanish introduction of adobe bricks:

In January, 1902, I had the good fortune to be present during the repairing of this old structure and of having the opportunity of thoroughly examining the walls as they were reconstructed. These were found to consist of (1) numerous fragments of recent Mexican adobe work, the result of occasional repairs; (2) large portions, perhaps three-fourths of the entire structure, of old Mexican adobe masonry contemporaneous with the major part of San Miguel chapel, and (3) in three places, forming the foundation and at no point exceeding 18 inches in height, considerable fragments of the original pueblo wall, the adobe masses exactly corresponding, in texture, dimensions, and mode of construction, with those in the remaining walls of the pueblo of Kwapoge on the hill formerly occupied by Old Fort Marcy, at the northern edge of the town.

Based on this work, Hewett concluded that the majority of the building was probably of Spanish colonial origin, but may have been partially built on the foundation of an earlier Puebloan structure. Ralph E. Twitchell believed the building had a Pueblo connection as well:

There is no doubt in my mind that the so-called "oldest house" is of pueblo construction, but that does not prove that there was a pueblo building on the spot; it was likely nothing but a detached house, and was two stories high... The "Mexican Indians" did not build two story houses, nor did they build houses, having opening in the top instead of the sides. The "oldest house" had its entrance in the roof and the dors [sic] and windows now appearing are all of very late construction.

Adolph Bandelier disputed the existence of the Analco pueblo and believed the house to have been constructed in the 1690s. A dendochronology study of the wooden vigas (ceiling beams) in the house reportedly showed they were cut between 1740 and 1767. In 1903, the house became part of St. Michael's College along with the neighboring San Miguel Mission and Lamy Building. At the time, the building was in disrepair:

The building which contains seven rooms is twelve feet high and until a few years ago the firm dirt blocks of which it is built showed no sign of breaking. Lately, however, it has begun to show its centuries and within the past two years continuous repairs have been necessary to keep the rains and wind from coming in. The walls are still as firm apparently, as when they were put up in the sixteenth century but the roof is a ruin.

The second story of the house was removed around the same time but was rebuilt in the 1920s, restoring the house to resemble its original appearance. It continues to operate as a tourist attraction, with the interior restored to an approximation of what it may have originally looked like.

== Architecture ==
The De Vargas Street House is a two-story adobe building; the first floor is original and the second floor was reconstructed based on the original in the 1920s. Most of the house is constructed from adobe brick, which was a Spanish colonial technology, while a few lower wall sections are puddled adobe characteristic of pre-Spanish pueblo buildings. The first-floor ceiling is original and includes vigas dating to the mid-18th century. The first floor interior has two Spanish colonial-style rooms with corner fireplaces, while the second floor is "a dummy" and not open to visitors.

== Gallery ==
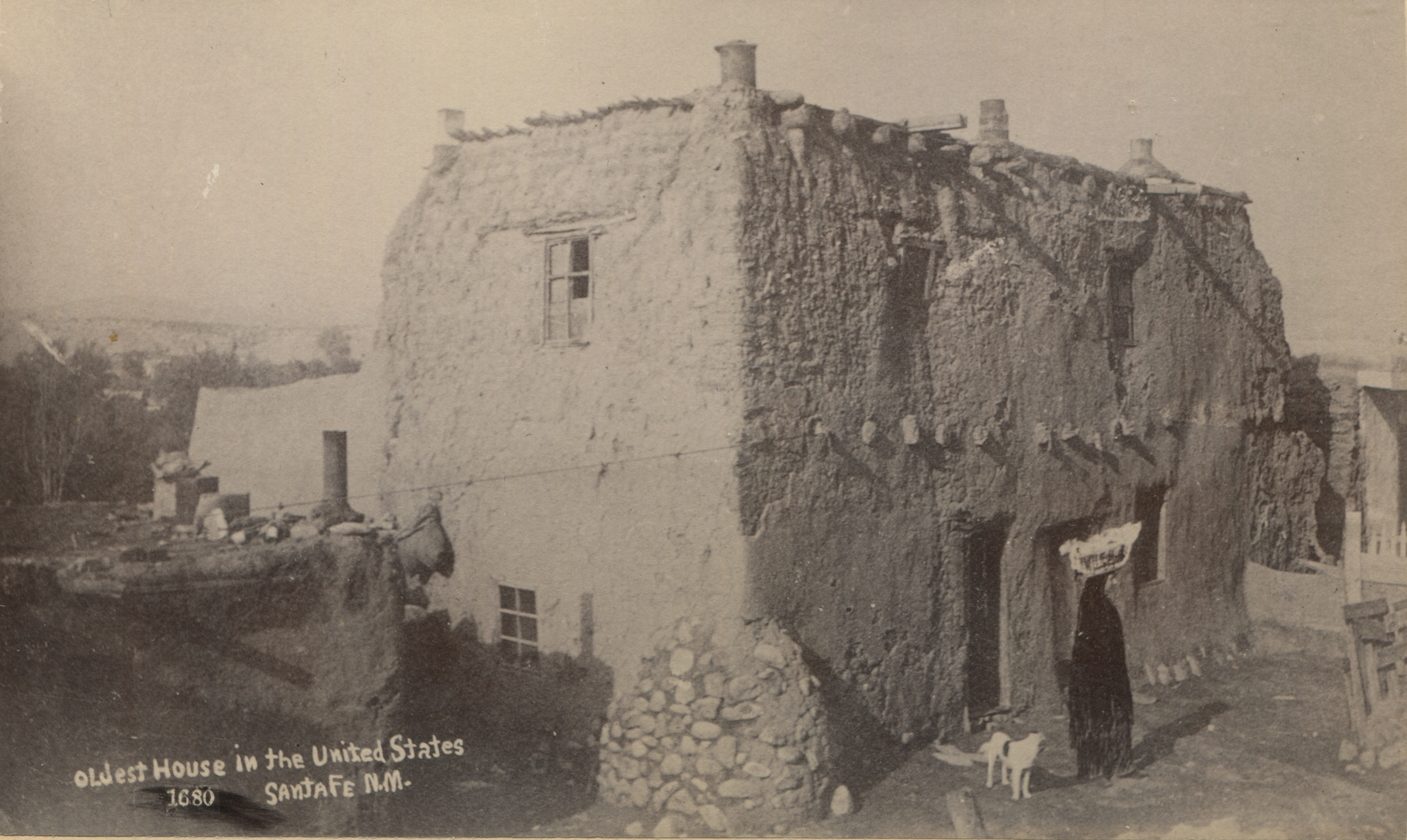
ca. 1880 cabinet card photograph

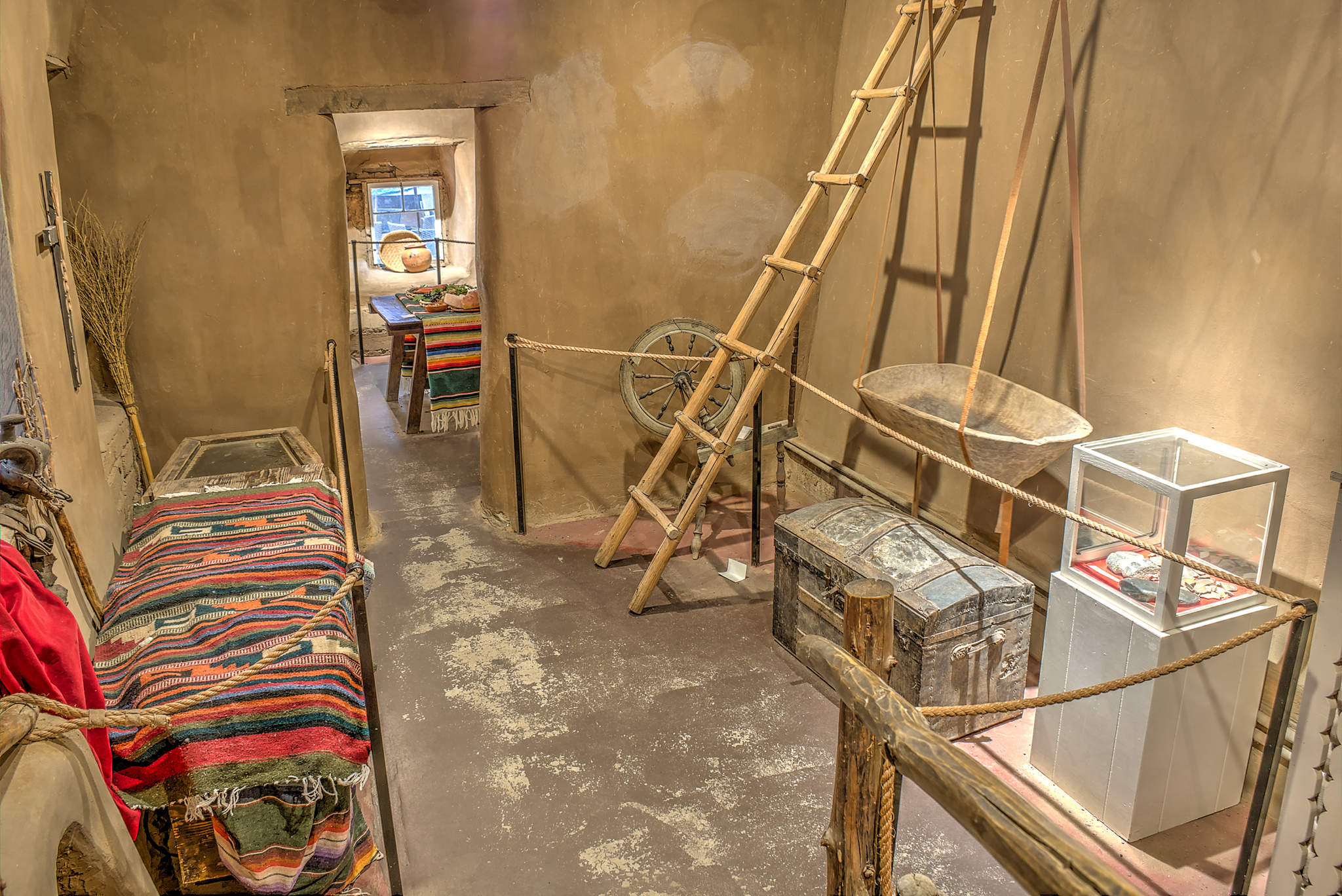
detail of room

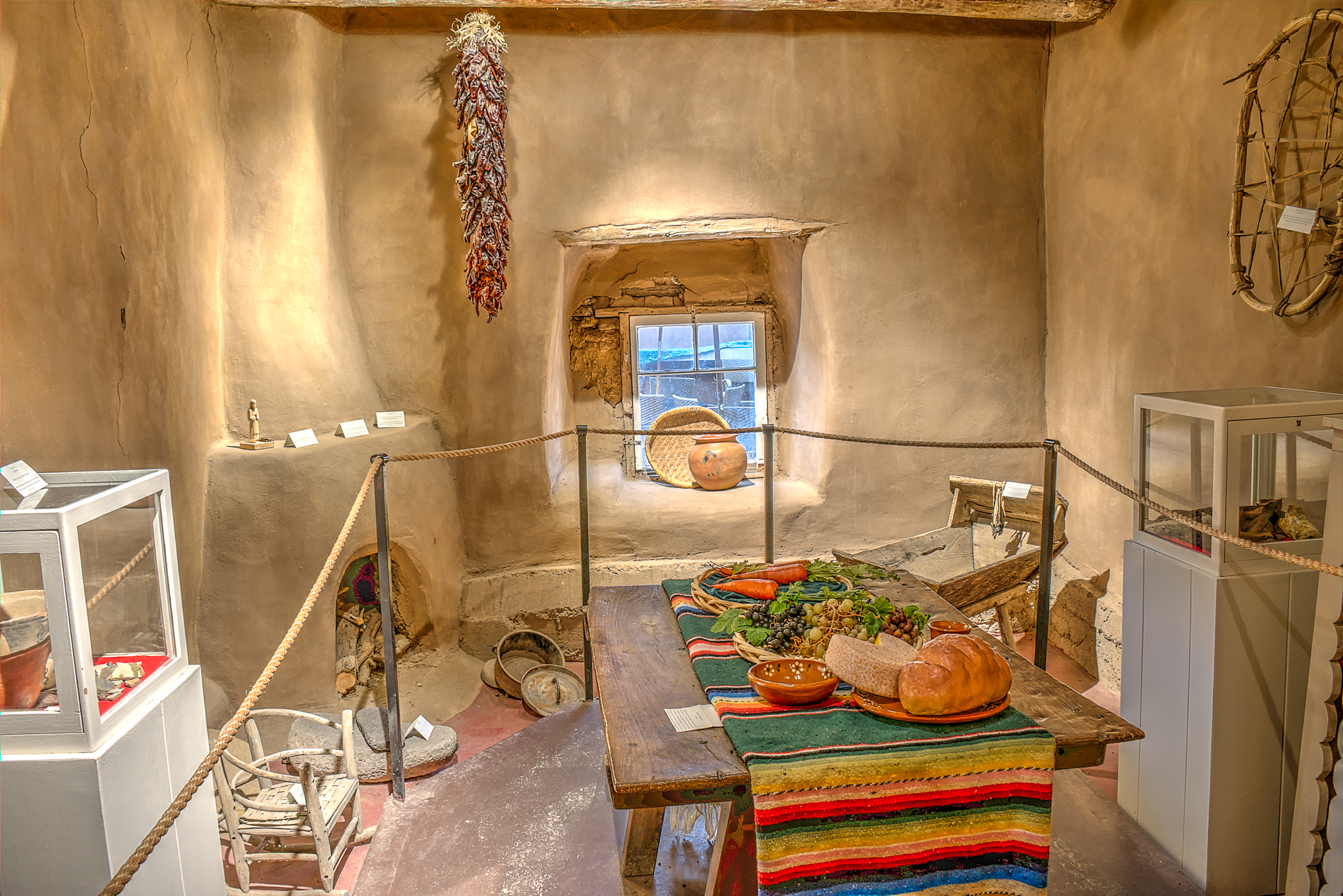
detail of room

== See also ==
- List of the oldest buildings in New Mexico
