= Frederick Peralta =

American politician (born 1945)

Fred Peralta

Secretary of the New Mexico Tourism Department
- In office 2003–2004
- Governor: Bill Richardson
- Succeeded by: Mike Cerletti

Mayor of Taos, New Mexico
- In office 1994–2003
- Preceded by: Eloy Jeantete
- Succeeded by: Bobby Duran

Member of the New Mexico House of Representatives from the 42nd district
- In office 1987–1994
- Succeeded by: Roberto Gonzales

Personal details
- Born: Frederick Peralta; October 8, 1945 (age 80) San Francisco, California, U.S.

Frederick "Fred" Peralta (born October 8, 1945) is an American politician who served as a member of the New Mexico House of Representatives for the 42nd district from 1987 to 1994.

== Career ==
Peralta was born in San Francisco on October 8, 1945, but moved to New Mexico two months later. He graduated from Taos High School before studying at the Aquinas Institute in River Forest, Illinois. Peralta served on the Taos Planning and Zoning Commission from 1974 to 1984 as well as the Taos Historical Commission from 1980 to 1984.

As a member of the New Mexico House of Representatives, Peralta served concurrently as the mayor of Taos from 1994 to 2003. He was also a member of the Taos City Council. During the administration of Governor Bill Richardson, Peralta served as secretary of the New Mexico Tourism Department and manager of the New Mexico State Fair. Peralta is the namesake of Fred Peralta Hall, a building on the University of New Mexico–Taos campus.
