= Gallo Cliff Dwelling =

Gallo Cliff Dwelling is a pair of Ancestral Puebloan room blocks that lie under a cliff in Gallo Canyon, New Mexico, United States. Located adjacent to the National Park Service campground, the site includes a central room that features a multi-storied wall and a five-room structure with kiva that was probably occupied during the early 12th century by Mesa Veredans, who built in a distinctive McElmo masonry style. The inhabitants of these dwellings dates from 1150 to 1200 AD, or the late Chacoan Period. National Park Service excavations there during the 1960s uncovered a quantity of perishable items, including sandals and baskets, from the rooms.

Coordinates: 36°2′15.0″N 107°53′26.6″W

== See also ==
- List of the oldest buildings in New Mexico
