= List of the oldest buildings in New Mexico =

This article lists the oldest extant buildings in New Mexico, including extant buildings and structures constructed during Spanish, Mexican, and early American rule over New Mexico. Only buildings built prior to 1850 are suitable for inclusion on this list, or the building must be the oldest of its type.

In order to qualify for the list, a structure must:

- be a recognizable building (defined as any human-made structure used or intended for supporting or sheltering any use or continuous occupancy);
- incorporate features of building work from the claimed date to at least 1.5 metres (4.9 ft) in height and/or be a listed building.

This consciously excludes ruins of limited height, roads and statues. Bridges may be included if they otherwise fulfill the above criteria. Dates for many of the oldest structures have been arrived at by radiocarbon dating or dendrochronology and should be considered approximate. If the exact year of initial construction is estimated, it will be shown as a range of dates.

== List of oldest buildings ==
Building	Image	Location	First built	Use	Notes
Chaco Culture National Historical Park		San Juan County and McKinley County	900-1150	Residences	
Acoma Pueblo		Acoma Pueblo	1000-1200	Residences	
Taos Pueblo		Taos	1000-1450	Residences	
Gallo Cliff Dwelling		Nageezi	1150-1200	Residences	
Aztec Ruins National Monument		Aztec	ca. 1200s-1300s	Residences	
Palace of the Governors		Santa Fe	1610	Government building	Oldest government building in continental U.S.
San Miguel Mission		Santa Fe	1610	Residences	Possibly the oldest church in the continental U.S.
De Vargas Street House		Santa Fe	ca. 1646	Residence	Often described in the past as the oldest European house in New Mexico or America

== See also ==
- National Register of Historic Places listings in New Mexico
- Spanish missions in New Mexico
- History of New Mexico
- Oldest buildings in the United States
