= New Mexico True =

New Mexico True is a tourism campaign by the New Mexico Tourism Department. This New Mexico program seeks to focus on being "authentic and true in its people, landscape and culture"; the goal being to dismiss misconceptions and misunderstandings of the state, and to create a more cohesive set of statewide tourist destinations, based on personal interests, from New Mexico's various locales. Though it is aimed at broader national and international tourism, it seeks to bring tourists from around neighboring states, Colorado, Arizona, and Texas. The campaign also seeks to educate local businesses and to encourage staycations within the state.

== History ==
The New Mexico True tourism $2 million campaign by the New Mexico Tourism Department. Though the campaign has been well received, it has been criticized. The first set of criticism was due to the Tourism Department's use of a non-New Mexican advertising agency to create the campaign, Vendor Inc. from Austin, Texas. Though, when Vendor performed surveys on "samplings of travelers", they found the state's basic misunderstandings began at a fundamental level; with the results of the survey being, "'boring;', a 'desert wasteland' where 'there is not a lot to do'; 'artsy' — which is appealing 'you know for an hour'; 'is the lost state' that many travelers drive through to get to neighboring states; does not offer skiing but does have 'beaches'; and apparently includes El Paso." It was from this research that one of the campaigns goals of "combating the negative perceptions about New Mexico" derives. The second negative criticism the campaign faced was when "a California producer", hired by Vendor, made a casting calling for "a light-skinned Hispanic". The New Mexico Tourism Department responded to the criticism by stating that the actor was intended to portray a tourist. They began to proactively pursue local talent, and began to focus on hiring local production companies, like Rio Rancho, New Mexico's CliffDweller Digital to produce shorts like "New Mexico True Stories", and the syndicated educational travel television series New Mexico True Television. They also used an Albuquerque, New Mexico based music group for the campaign's theme song "Feels Like Home".

== New Mexico True Trails ==
The New Mexico True Trails are a set of recommended locations divided by interest, and then by location.

- Breakfast Burrito Byway contains a list of recommended restaurants and eateries that serve New Mexican cuisine-style breakfast burritos.
- Green Chile Cheeseburger Trail contains a list of recommended restaurants and eateries that serve New Mexican cuisine-style green chile cheeseburgers.
- Ghost Towns of New Mexico a list of ex-boomtowns that have since become ghost towns.
- Fall Color in New Mexico a list of leaf peeping recommended sites for viewing fall foliage.
- New Mexico Wine Trail a list of New Mexico wineries across the state in conjunction with the New Mexico Wine Country, the state's Winegrowers Association.

== See also ==
- New Mexico Magazine
- New Mexico True Television
