= Ron Porterfield =

- Education: New Mexico State University
- Occupation: Baseball athletic trainer
- Years active: 1988–present
- Employer: Tampa Bay Rays

Ron Porterfield is an American Major League Baseball athletic trainer. He has been the head athletic trainer for the Tampa Bay Rays since 2006.

== Early life ==
Porterfield is a native of Santa Fe, New Mexico. He is a 1983 graduate of St. Michael's High School (Santa Fe) and a 1988 graduate of New Mexico State University.

== Professional baseball career ==
=== Houston Astros (1988–1996) ===
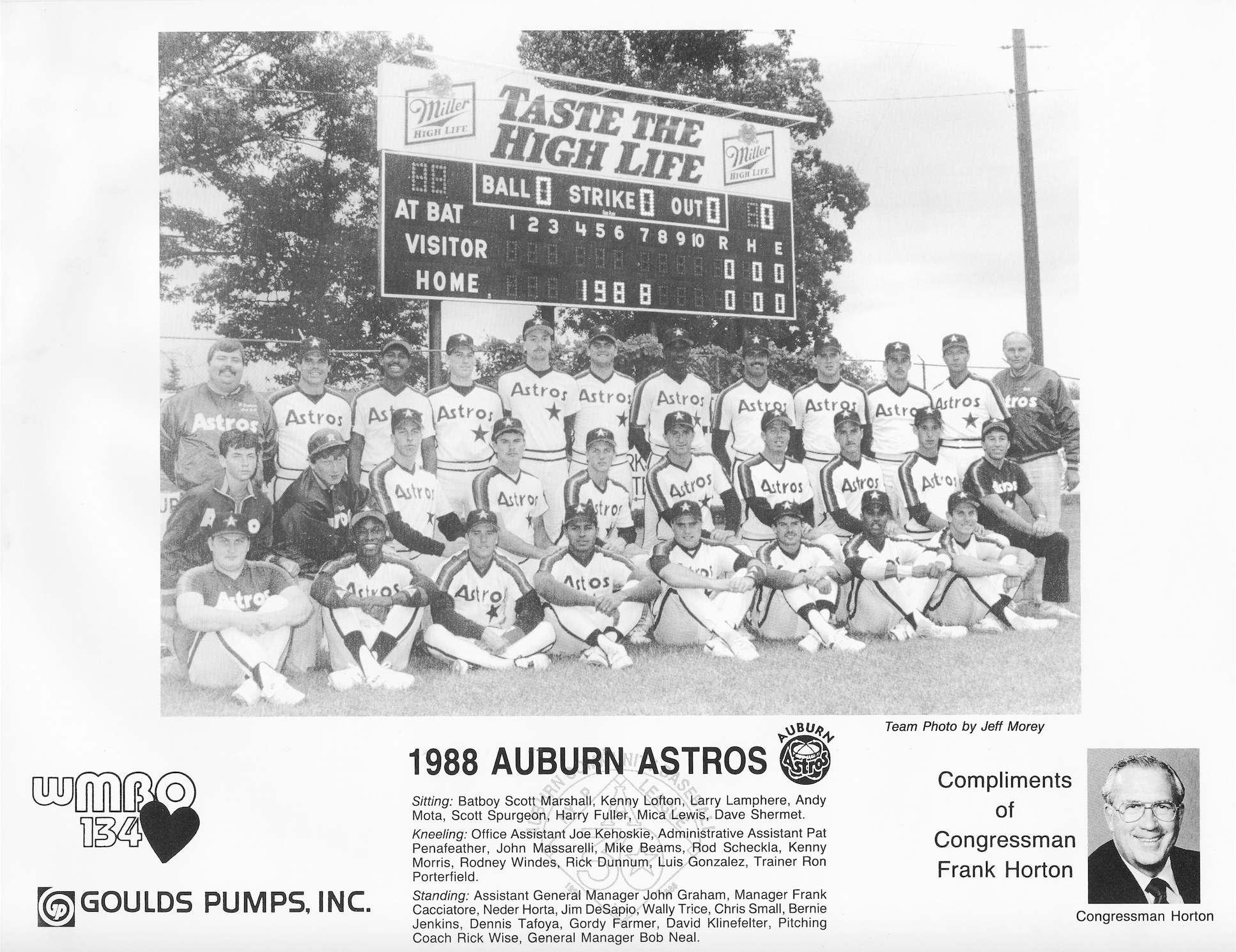
1988 Auburn Astros team photo

Porterfield began his professional baseball career as the trainer for the 1988 Auburn Astros of the Class A New York–Penn League. Porterfield continued working in the Houston Astros minor league system through the 1996 season. He was named Texas League "Athletic Trainer of the Year" in 1992.

=== Tampa Bay Rays (1997–present) ===
In 1997, Porterfield was hired by the expansion Tampa Bay Devil Rays, now known as the Tampa Bay Rays, to be the team's Minor League Medical and Rehabilitation Coordinator, a position he held until 2002. Porterfield joined the Rays' Major League team as assistant athletic trainer in 2003, and was named head athletic trainer in 2006. As of 2011, Porterfield is one of the few remaining members of the Rays staff who have been with the organization since its inception.

In Tampa, Porterfield has been lauded by All-Star pitchers David Price and James Shields for his training methods. Former Rays outfielder Rocco Baldelli, who was unable to play for most of 2007 and 2008 due to a mysterious ailment that was originally thought to be life-threatening and was later diagnosed as channelopathy, said his playing career, which he described as having hit "rock bottom," might never have resumed if not for Porterfield's time and dedication in pursuing a proper diagnosis and treatment. By the time Baldelli left the Rays as a free agent during the 2008–09 offseason, Porterfield had amassed a 3,000-page medical file on Baldelli, which Porterfield forwarded to Baldelli's new team, the Boston Red Sox.

Porterfield shared "Major League Athletic Training Staff of the Year" honors in both 2005 and 2009.

== Personal life ==
Porterfield resides in Parrish, Florida, with his wife and two children.
