= Barrio de Analco Historic District =

Historic district in New Mexico, United States

- U.S. National Register of Historic Places
- U.S. National Historic Landmark District
- U.S. Historic district – Contributing property
- NM State Register of Cultural Properties
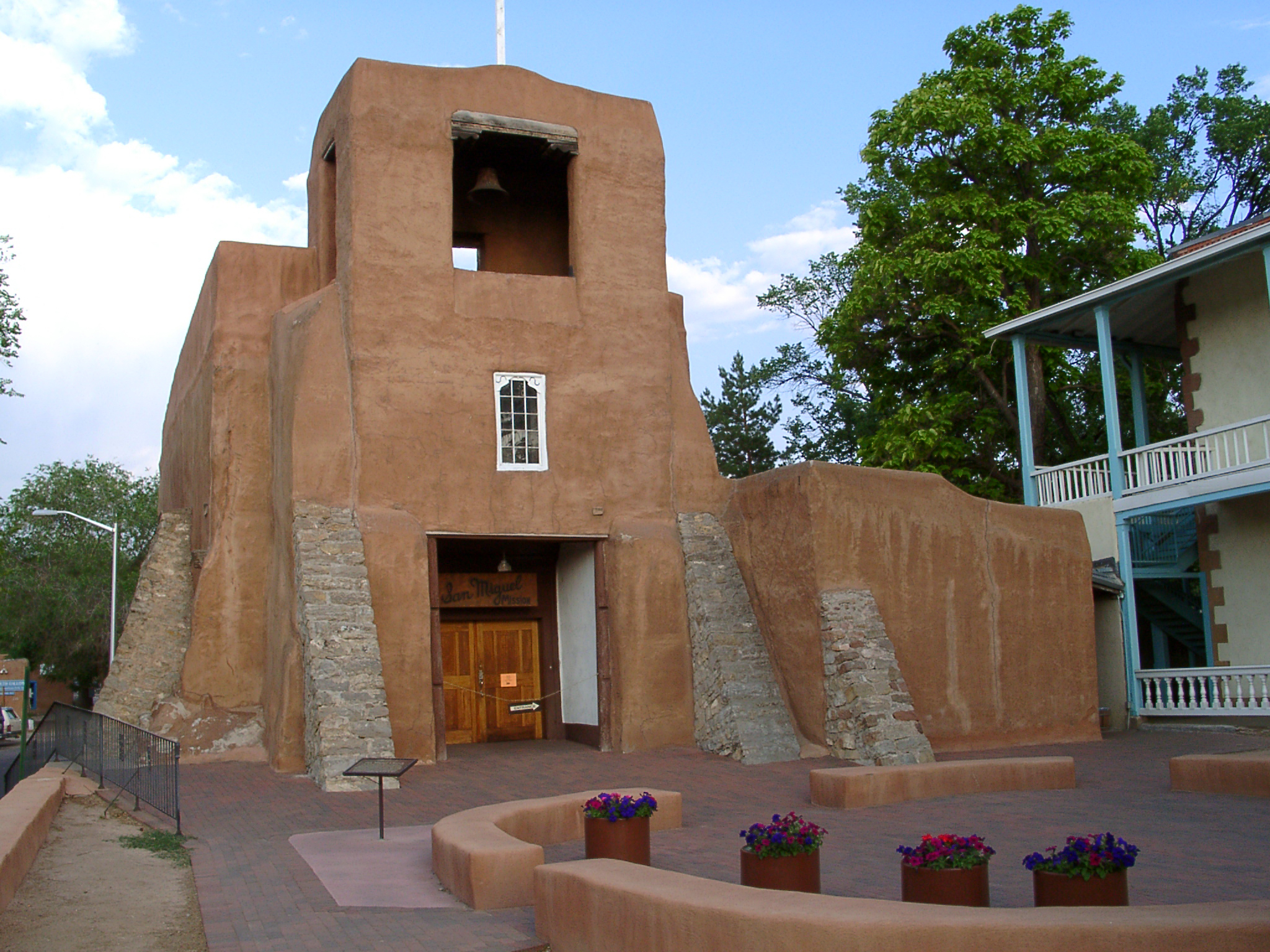
- San Miguel chapel

- Location within New Mexico Location within the United States
- Location: Roughly bounded by E. De Vargas and College Sts., Santa Fe, New Mexico
- Coordinates: 35°41′0″N 105°56′11″W
- Area: 18 acres (7.3 ha)
- Built: 1620
- Architectural style: Spanish-Pueblo, Territorial architecture
- Part of: Santa Fe Historic District (ID73001150)
- NRHP reference No.: 68000032
- NMSRCP No.: 260

Significant dates
- Added to NRHP: November 24, 1968
- Designated NHLD: October 18, 1968
- Designated CP: July 23, 1973
- Designated NMSRCP: September 29, 1972

The Barrio de Analco Historic District is a National Historic Landmark District centered at the junction of East De Vargas Street and Old Santa Fe Trail in Santa Fe, New Mexico. The seven buildings of the district represent one of the oldest clusters of what were basically working-class or lower-class residences in North America, and are in a cross-section of pre-statehood architectural styles. It includes two of the oldest colonial-era buildings in the southwest, the San Miguel Mission church (1710), and the "Oldest House", built in 1620 and now a museum. The district was declared a National Historic Landmark in 1968.

== History ==
The name "Analco" comes from the Nahuatl language spoken by the Tlaxcalan people from the state of Tlaxcala in central Mexico. The Tlaxcalans were enemies of the Aztec Empire and joined the Spanish invaders in conquering the Aztecs in 1521. As allies, they received favorable treatment and privileges from the Spanish including in perpetuity a large degree of self government, freedom from payment of taxes, and recognition as "hidalgos" (gentlemen). In exchange, the Tlaxcalans assisted the Spanish in settling and pacifying the distant parts of New Spain (Mexico). The word Analco in Nahua means "the other side of the river". The Tlaxcalans and other Native Americans (Indians) allied with the Spanish lived on the south side of the Santa Fe River while the seat of government and most Spaniards resided on the northern side of the river.

Tlaxcalans and other Mexican Indians were among the founders of Santa Fe in 1609, but the first mention of the Barrio ("neighborhood") de Analco is not until 1630 when Fray Alonso de Benavides said that Santa Fe had a population of 700 Indians, most of whom lived in the Barrio de Analco. Three hundred Spaniards also lived in Santa Fe. In 1680, the indigenous Puebloans expelled the Spanish and their Indian allies from New Mexico. Although the Spanish and some of the Indians returned in 1692, most of the Tlaxcalans remained in El Paso. The last mention of the Tlaxcalans in Barrio de Analco is in 1728. By that time they were assimilated into the Spanish and Indian population of New Mexico. In the 18th and 19th centuries, the residents of Barrio de Analco were married enlisted soldiers, artisans, servants, merchants, and genizaros, acculturated Plains Indians, many of them former slaves of the Spanish, who had lost their tribal identities.

New Mexico was conquered and annexed by the United States in the 1840s and the Americans introduced their own architectural styles and innovations which are also represented in the historic district.

== Description ==
The Barrio de Analco is located on the south side of the Santa Fe River, across the river from the main downtown area that includes the Santa Fe Plaza and the Palace of the Governors. The district is anchored at the junction of Old Santa Fe Trail and East De Vargas Street, and extends a short way (partial blocks) to the south, east and west. The San Miguel Mission church, on a site occupied by a church since the 1610s, is at the southeast corner, and the 1620 "Oldest House", a two-story adobe construction, is at the northeast corner. South of the mission is the Lamy Building, also known as St. Michael's Dormitory, an 1878 school building that exemplifies the Territorial style that was common in the pre-statehood era.

West of the main junction, separated from it by the Santa Fe Playhouse, are the Gregorio Crespin House and the Roque Tudesqui House, both built in the Spanish Pueblo style. The Crespin House was built in the mid-18th century; the construction date of the Tudesqui House is unknown, but probably 18th century. Separated from the rest of the district near the junction of East De Vargas and Paseo de Peralta are the Boyle House, also a mid-18th century Spanish Pueblo building, and the Bandelier House, an 1867 Territorial style house that is further notable as a home of archaeologist Adolph Bandelier.

== See also ==
- National Register of Historic Places listings in Santa Fe County, New Mexico
- List of National Historic Landmarks in New Mexico
