= New Mexico True Television =

- Genre: Travel
- Starring: Michael Newman
- Country of origin: United States
- No. of seasons: 5
- No. of episodes: 60~

Production
- Executive producer: Richard Holcomb
- Producer: Melinda Frame
- Editors: Melinda Frame, Dan Schueler, Michael Newman
- Running time: 24 minutes
- Production company: Cliffdweller Productions

Original release
- Release: June 16, 2014 – present

New Mexico True Television is an American educational and travel television series hosted by Michael Newman. The host travels to various parts of the state of New Mexico and shows the histories of attractions, people, and locations; all while he gives travel advice for potential tourists and imparts educational information for locals and regular visitors. It premiered on June 16, 2014 and is produced by Cliffdweller Productions. The show is funded by the New Mexico Tourism Department, as part of the state's broader New Mexico True tourism campaign. It is currently syndicated in New Mexico and Texas, on KOB, KFOX-TV, KLCW-TV.

== Episodes ==
=== Season 1 ===
#	Air date	Region/Title	Locations
1	June 16, 2014	Northeast	Victory Ranch in Mora, New Mexico; Old Pass Gallery in Raton, New Mexico; Solano's Boot & Western Wear in Raton, New Mexico; The Raton Museum in Raton, New Mexico; Shuler Theater in Raton, New Mexico; Vermejo Park Ranch; Dwan Light Sanctuary, owned by Virginia Dwan, in Montezuma, New Mexico; St. James Hotel in Cimarron, New Mexico
2	June 22, 2014	Southwest	Very Large Array; Pie-O-Neer Pies in Pie Town, New Mexico; Spaceport America; Adobe Deli in Deming, New Mexico; Mesilla, New Mexico; Mimbres, Youth Mural Program in Silver City, New Mexico; Ann McMahon in Silver City, New Mexico; Yada Yada Yarn in Silver City, New Mexico; City of Rocks State Park
3	Jun 29, 2014	Southeast	Mountain biking at Ski Apache; Horseback Riding at Inn of the Mountain Gods; Billy the Kid Scenic Byway; Fort Stanton; Lincoln, New Mexico; Spencer Theater in Alto, New Mexico; Smokey Bear National Park; Hubbard Museum of the American West; Roswell Museum and Art Center; Anderson Museum of Contemporary Art; Roswell Fine Arts League Gallery; Big D's Downtown Dive in Roswell, New Mexico; Roswell Antique Mall; Valley of Fires Recreation Area in Carrizozo Malpais; Three Rivers Petroglyph Site; McGinn's Pistachio Tree Ranch; White Sands National Monument
4	July 7, 2014	Northwest	Kokopelli Cave near Farmington, New Mexico; Four Corners Monument; Fly Fishing the San Juan Quality Waters near the Navajo Dam; Sammy C's Rockin Sports Pub & Grille in Gallup, New Mexico; Ballooning at Red Rock Park near Gallup, New Mexico
5	July 14, 2014	North central	Ghost Ranch; Santa Fe Railyard district in Santa Fe, New Mexico; Shidoni Foundry in Santa Fe, New Mexico; Taos Pueblo; Earthship Biotecture in Taos, New Mexico; Los Rios River Runners in Taos, New Mexico
6	July 21, 2014	Central	Kasha-Katuwe Tent Rocks National Monument; Spence Hot Springs in Jemez Springs, New Mexico; Corrales Growers Market; Classic World Oriental Rugs and Kilms in Corrales, New Mexico; Corrales Bosque Gallery; Ambiente Southwest Interiors in Corrales, New Mexico; Et Cetera Consignments Home & Gifts in Corrales, New Mexico; Hannah & Nate's in Corrales, New Mexico; Stevie's Happy Bikes in Corrales, New Mexico; Breaking Bad Tour by ABQ Trolley Co. in Albuquerque, New Mexico; Silva's Saloon in Bernalillo, New Mexico; Sandia Peak Tramway in Albuquerque, New Mexico

=== Season 2 ===
#	Air date	Region/Title	Locations
1	June 16, 2014	San Antonio to T-or-C	Owl Bar & Café in San Antonio, New Mexico; The Buckhorn in San Antonio, New Mexico; Riverbend Hot Springs in Truth or Consequences, New Mexico; La Paloma Hot Springs & Spa in Truth or Consequences, New Mexico; Blackstone Hot Springs in Truth or Consequences, New Mexico; Sierra Grande Lodge & Spa in Truth or Consequences, New Mexico; Geronimo Springs Museum in Truth or Consequences, New Mexico; Chloride, New Mexico; Elephant Butte Lake State Park
2	September 15, 2014	Chama Valley	Fishtail Ranch in Chama, New Mexico; Heron Lake; Art Chick's Kayak in Chama, New Mexico; New Mexico Catamaran Club; Cumbres and Toltec Scenic Railroad; Los Rios River Runners
3	September 24, 2014	Wild West	SASS at Founders Ranch, near Edgewood, New Mexico; Recap of Season 1, Episode 3, Billy the Kid Scenic Byway; Recap of Season 2, Episode 1, Chloride; New Mexico Gunfighters Association, a wild west gunfighter acting group in Old Town Albuquerque; Recap of Season 1, Episode 1, St. James
4	October 21, 2014	Enchanted Circle	Ziplining, Angel Fire Bike Park, and golfing in Angel Fire Resort; Wild Earth Llama Adventures hiking in Taos, New Mexico; Disc golfing in Red River Ski Area; Square Dancing at Red River Community House; Bobcat Pass Cowboy Evenings
5	October 21, 2014	The Gila Region	

== Awards and reception ==
To date the show has won three consecutive regional Emmy Awards in the 2016, 2017, and 2018 Rocky Mountain division, for the “Magazine Program – Program/Special“ category.
