= Santa Fe Playhouse =

Coordinates: 35°41′2″N 105°56′20″W

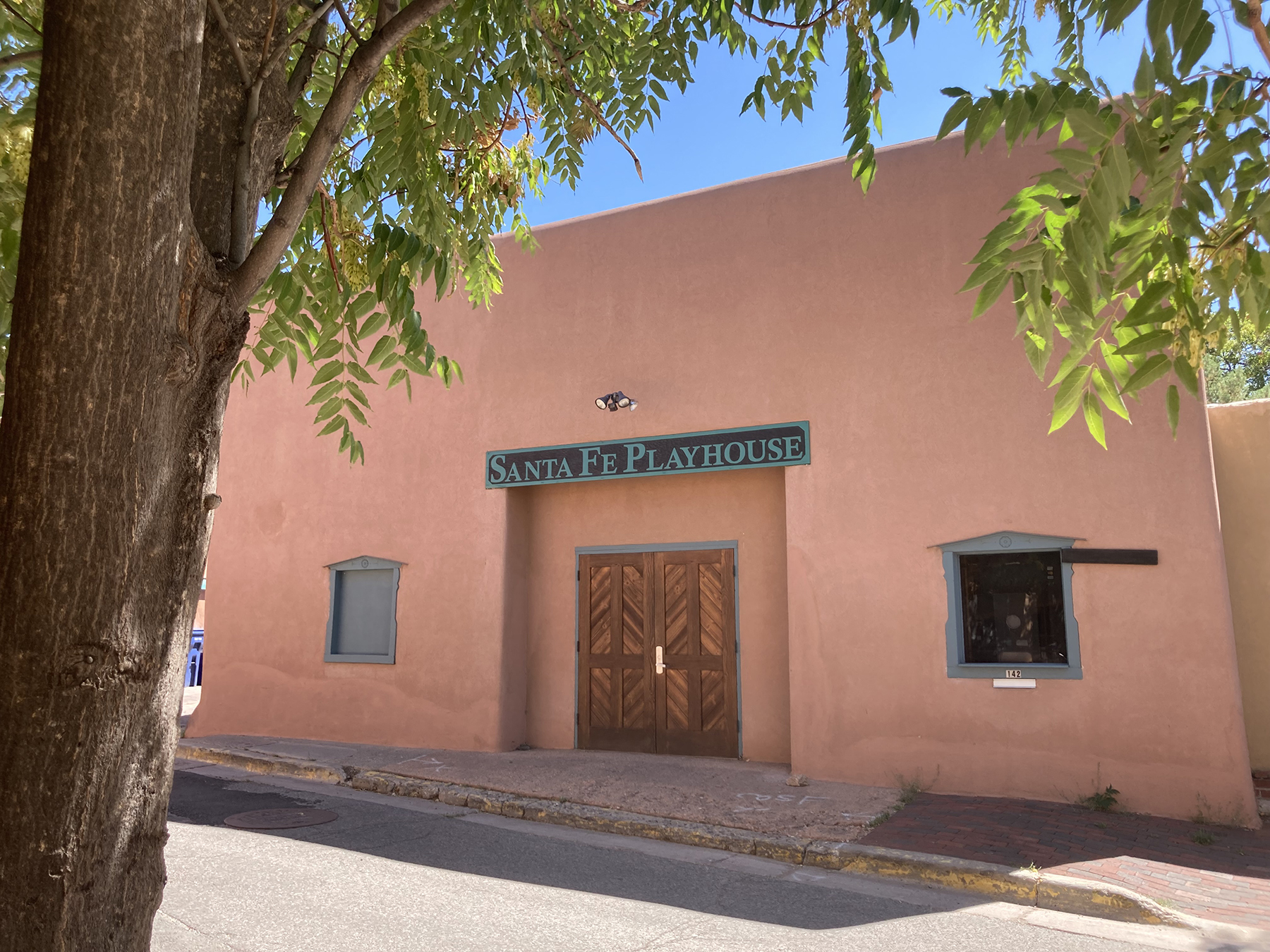
- Formation: 1922
- Type: Theatre group
- Location: 142 E. De Vargas St. Santa Fe New Mexico
- Artistic director: Anna Hogan
- Notable members: Mary Austin, Argos McCallum, Vaughn Irving, Richard Block, Antonio Minino, David Stallings, Zoe Burke.
- Website: santafeplayhouse.org

Santa Fe Playhouse is a non-profit professional theater based in Santa Fe New Mexico. Founded in 1919 by American novelist and essayist Mary Hunter Austin as The Santa Fe Little Theatre and incorporated in 1922, it is “the oldest continuously running theatre west of the Mississippi.” The theater found a permanent home in 1962 located at 142 East De Vargas Street in Santa Fe, New Mexico in the heart of the Barrio De Analco Historic District.

Santa Fe Playhouse is currently led by Artistic Director Anna Hogan; formerly, the artistic director was Robyn Rikoon with Executive Director Colin Hovde.

== History ==
The Santa Fe Little Theatre was founded by writer and social activist Mary Hunter Austin (1868–1934). Originally called the Santa Fe Players, it held its first performances in 1919 and incorporated in 1922. Austin took her cue from the national Little Theater movement, which provided homes for intimate, progressive, and experimental works outside of the profit-driven corporate theater world.

The first production, on February 14 and May 13, 1919, were in the St. Francis Auditorium at the newly constructed New Mexico Museum of Art.

The Santa Fe Players performed in temporary venues around Santa Fe, including tents at the rodeo grounds and makeshift shelters on the Plaza. Some early melodramas — still an annual tradition — were presented at an outdoor market that's now a hotel parking lot on Old Santa Fe Trail.

In 1962 the Santa Fe Players signed a lease and renovated an old livery stable in Barrio de Analco into a theater space which is the current venue at 142 E. De Vargas St. Over the years, the venue has been called many things, including Santa Fe Little Theater and Santa Fe Community Theater. In 1997, it became the Santa Fe Playhouse.

== Centennial Season (2022) ==
THE EFFECT written by Lucy Prebble, directed by Robyn Rikoon

March 12–Sunday, April 3

Edward Albee’s A DELICATE BALANCE directed by L. Zane Jones

April 23–Sunday, May 15

EVERYBODY written by Branden Jacobs-Jenkins (director TBD)

June 18–Sunday, July 10

SKELETAL SERIES

July 20–Saturday, Aug. 13 – exact dates TBA

SANTA FE FIESTA MELODRAMA written by courageous, anonymous locals, directed by Andrew Primm and Eliot Fisher

Aug. 27–Sunday, Sept. 4: Santa Fe Playhouse

Sept 8–Sunday, Sept 18: local tour, TBA

THE MOUNTAINTOP written by Katori Hall, director TBD

Sept. 24–Sunday, Oct. 16

AN ILIAD written by Lisa Peterson and Denis O’Hare, performed by Patrick Osteen

Oct. 27–Saturday, Nov. 12: local bar tour TBA

A YEAR WITH FROG AND TOAD written by Robert and Willie Reale, directed by Rob Lutfy and Robyn Rikoon

Dec. 3–Sunday, Dec. 25

SWAIA PERFORMANCES

== Notable Guest Performers ==
Laura Gomez in The Baby Monitor (2023) Ali McGraw in Jammed (2024) Kate Udall in What The Constitution Means to Me (2024) Bradley Lewis in Pueblo Revolt (2025) Larysa Olynik in POTUS (2026)
