= List of U.S. states by the number of millionaire households =

This is a list of U.S. states and federal district by the number of households with more than $1 million in investable assets as of 2020 (data for the year 2019). The list is compiled annually by market research firm Phoenix Marketing International.

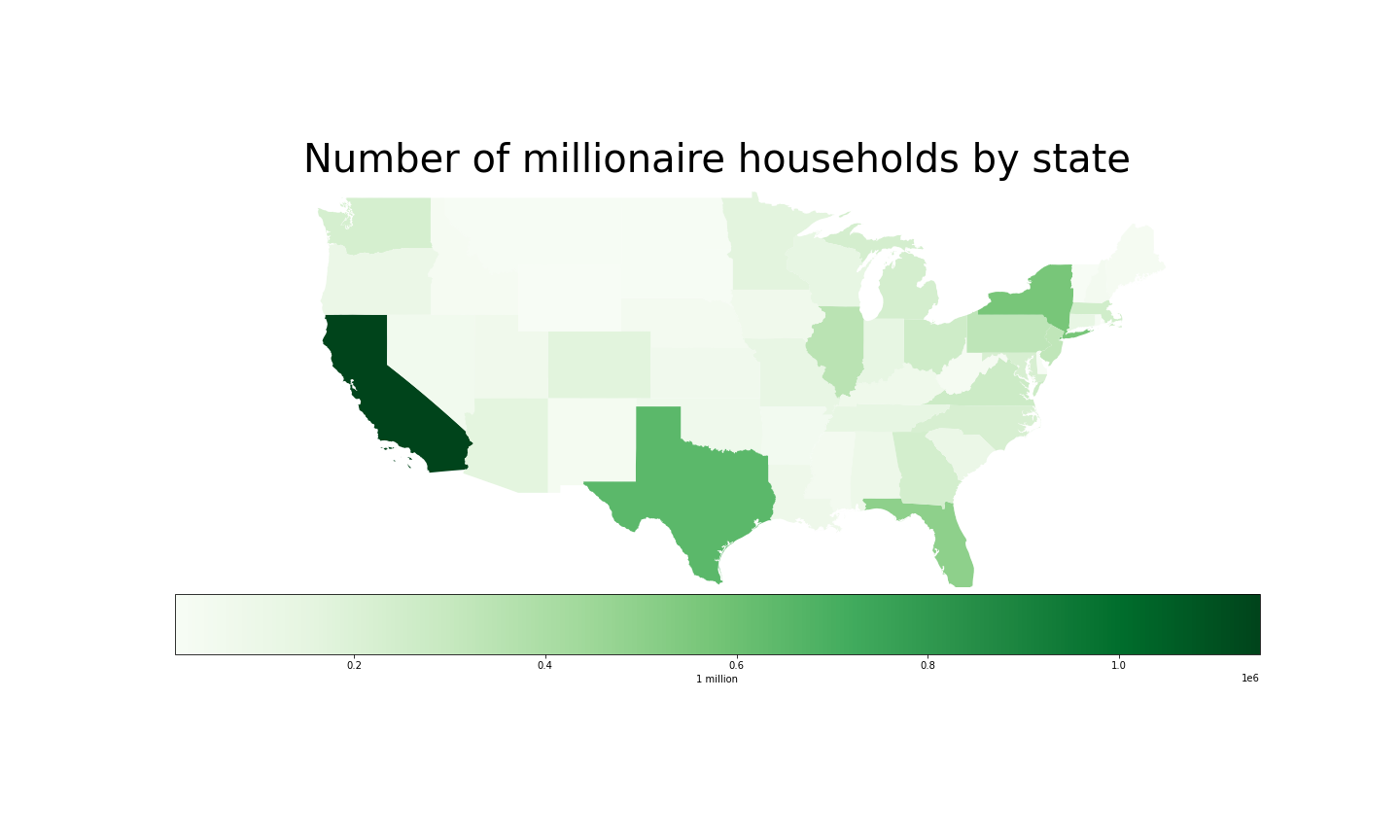
Based on data from Phoenix Marketing International

== List ==
States by number and share of households with more than $1 million in investable assets (2019)
Rank	State	Number of millionaire households	Share of millionaire households
1	California	1,147,251	8.51%
2	Texas	650,216	6.32%
3	New York	570,456	7.52%
4	Florida	496,971	5.87%
5	Illinois	346,873	7.13%
6	Pennsylvania	328,859	6.44%
7	New Jersey	323,443	9.76%
8	Virginia	272,103	8.31%
9	Ohio	261,157	5.54%
10	Massachusetts	254,201	9.38%
11	Georgia	239,287	6.07%
12	Michigan	236,858	5.97%
13	Washington	233,155	7.85%
14	North Carolina	224,054	5.45%
15	Maryland	221,189	9.72%
16	Colorado	170,223	7.48%
17	Minnesota	167,206	7.43%
18	Arizona	161,014	6.03%
19	Tennessee	139,335	5.21%
20	Indiana	138,739	5.34%
21	Wisconsin	138,283	5.83%
22	Missouri	132,176	5.39%
23	Connecticut	130,291	9.44%
24	Oregon	108,858	6.43%
25	South Carolina	108,812	5.40%
26	Alabama	94,259	4.87%
27	Louisiana	87,565	4.81%
28	Kentucky	83,624	4.69%
29	Oklahoma	75,567	4.90%
30	Iowa	73,129	5.71%
31	Utah	71,613	7.05%
32	Kansas	66,406	5.81%
33	Nevada	63,752	5.61%
34	Arkansas	51,532	4.33%
35	Mississippi	47,279	4.18%
36	New Hampshire	45,758	8.47%
37	Nebraska	45,130	5.86%
38	Hawaii	44,383	9.20%
39	New Mexico	40,450	4.97%
40	Idaho	33,656	5.14%
41	Maine	31,993	5.60%
42	West Virginia	31,535	4.21%
43	District of Columbia	29,506	9.12%
44	Rhode Island	28,165	6.69%
45	Delaware	25,937	6.98%
46	Montana	23,785	5.28%
47	Alaska	22,302	8.18%
48	North Dakota	20,002	6.16%
49	South Dakota	18,905	5.33%
50	Vermont	16,411	6.29%
51	Wyoming	12,849	5.45%
