= List of New Mexico counties by socioeconomic factors =

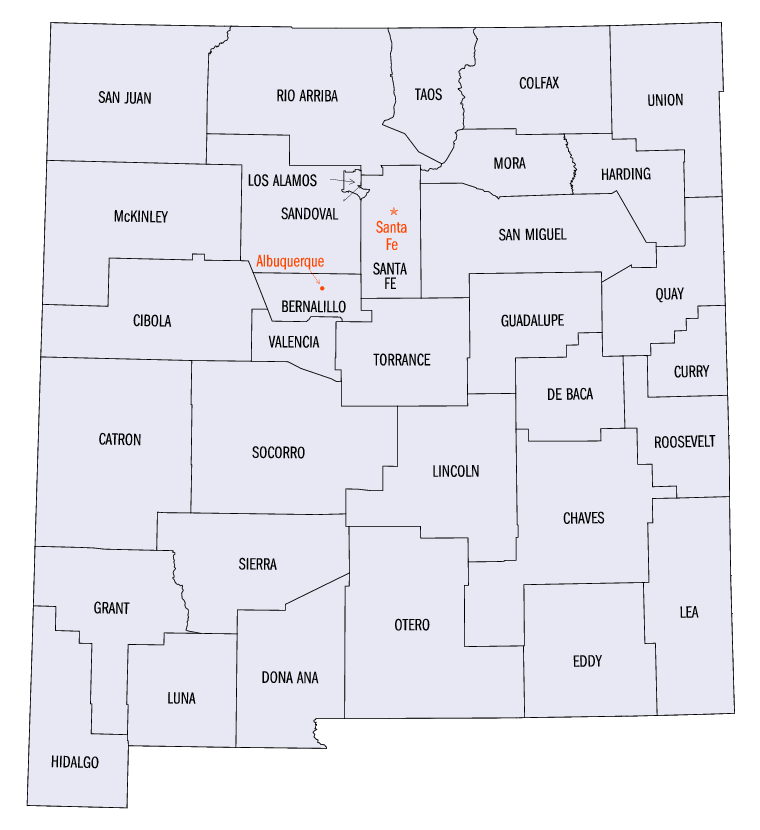

This list of New Mexico counties by socioeconomic factors is taken from the "Quick Facts" web pages of the United States Census Bureau and the Population Health Institute of the University of Wisconsin. All data listed is for 2020, unless otherwise stated.

Although some New Mexico counties exceed the U.S. average in positive socioeconomic factors, most New Mexico counties are below the U.S. average. The statistics in the following table show that New Mexico has a lower per capita and household income than the national average. The state has a lower rate of population growth, a less educated population as measured by the percentage of people with bachelor's or higher degrees compared to the national average, and higher rates of people in poverty and people without health insurance than the U.S. as a whole. New Mexico has an Hispanic majority population although many counties have a non-Hispanic white majority or plurality of population. Two counties have a Native American (Indian) plurality in their population. The state's vote for the Democratic candidate in the 2020 presidential election exceeded that of the Republican candidate.

The 2020 census is a snapshot of New Mexico's population. Depending upon the methodology used and the time of measurement, socioeconomic statistics cited change slightly from year to year, especially in counties with small populations where, for example, the gain or loss of a major employer may result in a change in measurements of poverty, population growth, income, and other factors.

== Socioeconomic statistics for New Mexico counties ==
	Per capita income	Median household income	Population 2020	Population growth rate 2010-2020	Racial characteristics of population	Life expectancy in years 2022	% of people in poverty	% of 25+ year old people with bachelor or higher degrees	% of people without health insurance	% vote for Biden in 2020 election
United States	$37,638	$69,201	331,449,520	7.4%	59.3% non-Hispanic white	78.5	11.6%	33.7%	9.8%	51.3%
New Mexico	$29,624	$54,020	2,117,522	2.8%	50.1% Hispanic	76.9	18.4%	28.5%	12.0%	54.3%
Counties
Bernalillo	$33,670	$56,290	676,444	2.1%	50.9% Hispanic	77.4	15.2%	36.3%	10.5%	61.0%
Catron	$22,779	$37,623	3,579	−3.9%	73.4% non-Hispanic white	80.4	19.8%	16.9%	6.5%	25.6%
Chaves	$24,329	$47,620	65,157	−0.7%	59.6% Hispanic	74.5	27.6%	16.9%	12.2%	28.4%
Cibola	$21,011	$47,300	27,172	−0.2%	44.4% Native American	74.4	26.4%	15.6%	12.3%	53.3%
Colfax	$25,131	$39,483	12,387	−9.9%	49.2% Hispanic	76.9	18.8%	21.8%	9.3%	43.4%
Curry	$25,966	$51,199	48,430	1.1%	44.9% Hispanic	76.1	18.9%	21.3%	12.4%	28.5%
De Baca	$18,101	$32,750	1,698	−16.0%	51.0% non-Hispanic white	77.3	19.6%	10.7%	13.2%	25.6%
Doña Ana	$24,645	$47,151	219,561	4.9%	69.3% Hispanic	78.6	19.3%	30.0%	13.5%	58.0%
Eddy	$32,650	$67,759	62,314	15.8%	52.2% Hispanic	74.3	13.8%	16.9%	11.2%	23.4%
Grant	$25,801	$39,423	28,185	−4.5%	49.9% Hispanic	76.8	18.6%	26.9%	8.5%	52.6%
Guadalupe	$22,374	$35,409	4,452	−5.0%	78.6% Hispanic	75.7	25.8%	8.5%	6.9%	56.4%
Harding	$35,900	$62,435	657	−5.5%	52.7% non-Hispanic white	n/a	17.4%	25.1%	10.9%	35.5%
Hidalgo	$23,029	$46,097	4,178	−14.6%	59.0% Hispanic	75.6	24.1%	18.0%	12.3%	41.7%
Lea	$27,507	$62,319	74,445	15.0%	62.4% Hispanic	74.4	18.8%	14.8%	14.2%	19.4%
Lincoln	$29,846	$47,247	20,269	−1.1%	59.7% non-Hispanic white	78.8	18.4%	24.4%	14.0%	31.0%
Los Alamos	$64,321	$123,677	19,419	8.2%	70.6% non-Hispanic white	83.9	3.7%	68.5%	3.1%	61.5%
Luna	$18,801	$33,914	25,427	1.3%	69.5% non-Hispanic white	74.9	27.6%	12.0%	14.4%	44.0%
McKinley	$17,571	$40,262	72,902	2.0%	79.9% Native American	67.9	30.3%	12.2%	17.7%	68.1%
Mora	$26,586	$37,549	4,189	−14.2%	80.9% Hispanic	79.2	21.9%	17.1%	8.2%	65.0%
Otero	$23,792	$46,949	67,839	−0.9%	47.1% non-Hispanic white	77.1	19.9%	20.1%	13.3%	36.0%
Quay	$21,501	$33,067	8,746	−3.3%	47.8% non-Hispanic white	73.4	22.3%	15.5%	10.6%	29.6%
Rio Arriba	$25,342	$46,994	40,363	0.2%	71.3% Hispanic	72.6	20.4%	17.7%	10.9%	66.1%
Roosevelt	$22,192	$47,897	19,191	−3.3%	49.0% non-Hispanic white	76.4	21.1%	17.7%	10.9%	27.3%
Sandoval	$32,246	$68,947	148,834	13.1%	41.3% non-Hispanic white	78.5	9.4%	31.0%	10.1%	53.0%
San Juan	$22,857	$47,485	121,661	−6.4%	42.9% Native American	74.0	24.3%	14.9%	14.2%	34.6%
San Miguel	$24,019	$36,492	27,201	−7.5%	77.6% Hispanic	77.0	21.4%	23.9%	8.5%	68.4%
Santa Fe	$39,723	$61,990	87,505	28.8%	54.3% Hispanic	81.0	13.3%	42.8%	8.5%	76.1%
Sierra	$26,375	$35,939	11,576	−3.4%	62.9% non-Hispanic white	72.1	26.7%	19.8%	10.5%	38.1%
Socorro	$19,840	$38,242	16,595	−7.1%	50.9% Hispanic	75.5	22.2%	18.2%	12.2%	52.0%
Taos	$31,837	$49,481	34,489	4.7%	56.4% Hispanic	79.4	18.6%	32.5%	11.5%	76.4%
Torrance	$21,364	$44,819	15,045	−7.2%	49.0% non-Hispanic white	76.5	22.7%	15.2%	10.5%	32.2%
Union	$21,667	$37,443	4,079	−10.3%	50.5% non-Hispanic white	76.9	19.5%	16.2%	12.8%	21.4%
Valencia	$26,295	$53,752	76,205	−0.5%	61.8% Hispanic	76.5	18.8%	19.4%	11.4%	44.3%

Sources: , "Quick Facts", U.S. Census Bureau, accessed 12 April 2023. Search counties, each of which has a page with the above data, by name and state. , "County Health Rankings & Roadmaps," Population Health Institute, University of Wisconsin, accessed 12 April 2023. Life expectancy found under heading of "Additional Health Outcomes" for each county.
