= Lamy Building =

- St. Michael's Dormitory
- U.S. Historic district – Contributing property
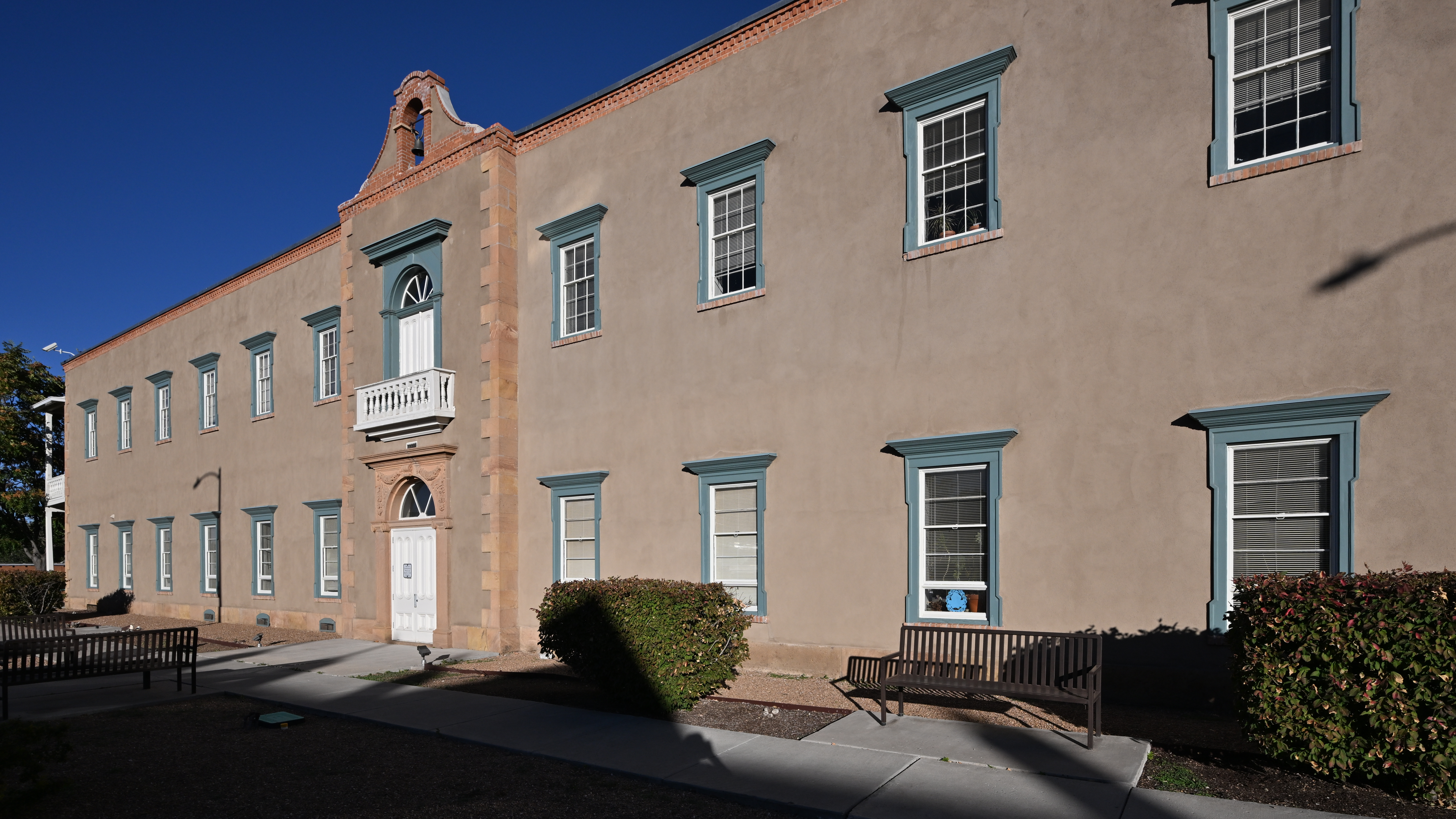
- Main entrance, 2009

- Location within New Mexico Location within the United States
- Location: 413 Old Santa Fe Trail, Santa Fe, New Mexico
- Coordinates: 35°41′0″N 105°56′16″W
- Built: 1878
- Architectural style: Territorial
- Part of: Barrio De Analco Historic District (ID68000032)
- Designated CP: November 24, 1968

The Lamy Building, also known as St. Michael's Dormitory, is a historic building in Santa Fe, New Mexico. It was built in 1878 as the main building of St. Michael's College, the predecessor of St. Michael's High School and the College of Santa Fe. The building is a contributing property in the Barrio De Analco Historic District and currently serves as the headquarters of the New Mexico Tourism Department.

== History ==
St. Michael's College was established at the behest of Archbishop Jean-Baptiste Lamy, who had arrived in New Mexico in 1851 to find that formal schooling in the territory was nonexistent. After establishing the Loretto Academy for girls in 1852, Lamy recruited the De La Salle Christian Brothers to open a similar school for boys, and St. Michael's held its first classes in the fall of 1859. In the 1870s, the school appointed a new leader, Brother Botulph, who oversaw its growth into an institution of higher learning. Under Botulph, St. Michael's began offering high school diplomas, and later, teaching certificates. In 1874 it received a charter from the territorial legislature, making it the oldest chartered college in New Mexico. The college eventually phased out its post-secondary courses but continued to operate as St. Michael's High School, while a new St. Michael's College was established at a separate campus in 1947.

In 1877, Brother Botulph started a fundraising campaign to construct a new building for the school which netted sheep, goats, and cattle in addition to cash and building materials. Ground was broken on the building in April 1878 and it was ready for classes by November. The first two stories were constructed from adobe, while the third floor was wood-framed to save weight. In 1926, the wooden upper story was destroyed by a fire, reducing the building to its present two-story height. After this, it remained in use as a dormitory but was vacated when St. Michael's moved to a new campus in 1966. The building was sold to the state of New Mexico and renamed in honor of Archbishop Lamy; it now houses the New Mexico Tourism Department. It was remodeled in the Territorial Revival style in the 1950s, adding brick coping and a bellcote to the parapet. The building was listed on the National Register of Historic Places and New Mexico State Register of Cultural Properties in 1968 as a contributing property in the Barrio De Analco Historic District.

== Architecture ==
In its present form, the building is a nearly symmetrical two-story adobe structure, 160 feet (49 m) in length by 30 feet (9.1 m) in width with a two-story Territorial Style portal or veranda wrapping around the north and east sides. The original wooden third floor had a mansard roof with evenly spaced dormer windows, a gambrel-roofed cross-gable above the main entrance, and a tall tower. After the fire in 1926, the building was truncated at the second floor with a flat roof. The present brick coping and bellcote were added during a 1950s remodeling.
