= Gregorio Crespin House =

- U.S. National Register of Historic Places
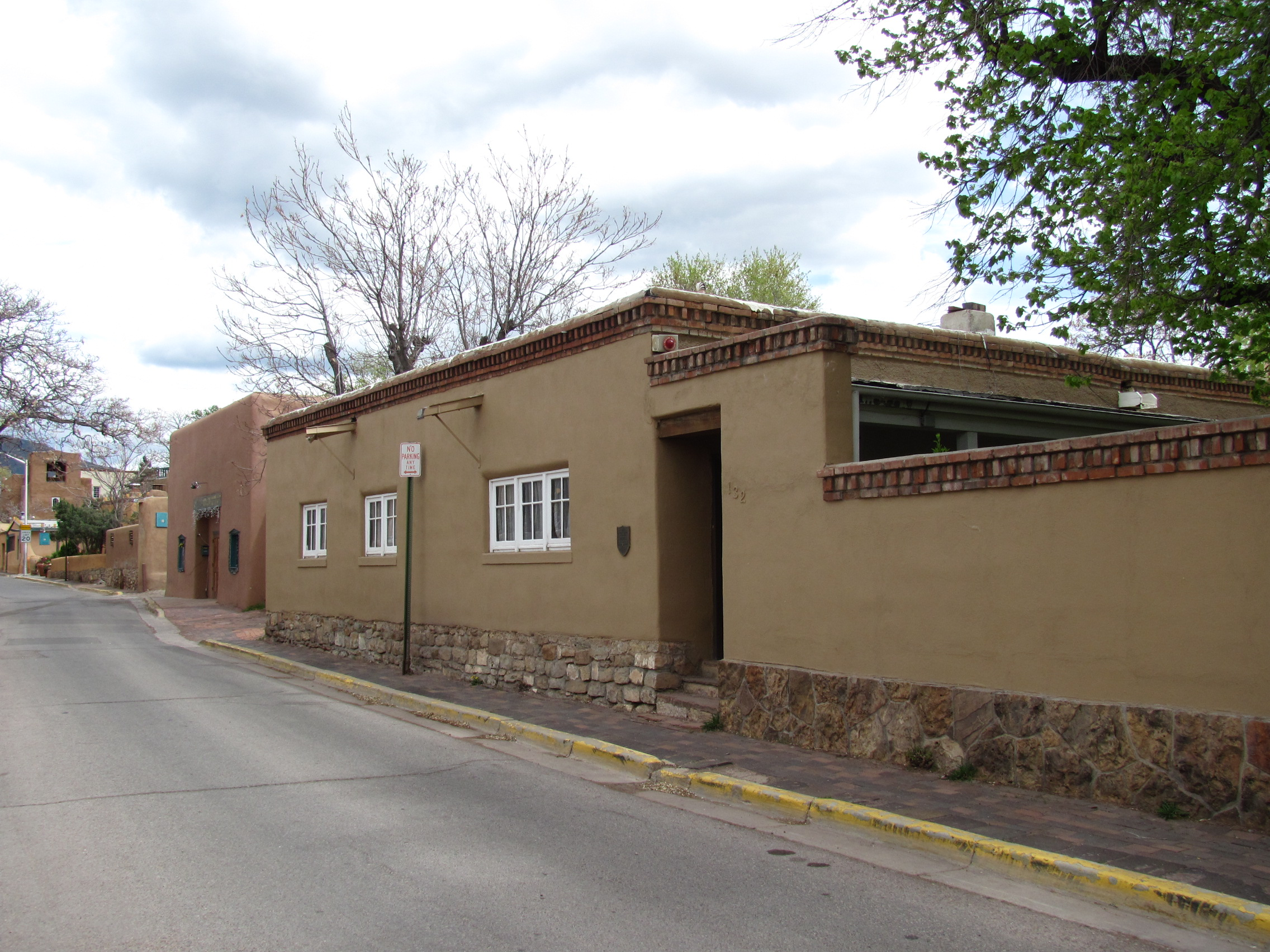

- Location within New Mexico
- Location: 132 E. De Vargas St., Santa Fe, New Mexico
- Coordinates: 35°41′02″N 105°56′19″W
- Area: 0.5 acres (0.20 ha)
- Built: c.1740
- NRHP reference No.: 75001167
- Added to NRHP: May 29, 1975

The Gregorio Crespin House, also known as the Van Stone House, is located at 132 E. De Vargas St. in Santa Fe, New Mexico. The adobe structure was built as a two-room house by Gregorio Crespin between 1720 and 1750. In 1867, it was expanded to include five rooms and a portal. In 1914, when the Van Stone family rented the house, it was enlarged to twelve rooms.

It was listed on the National Register of Historic Places in 1975. The listing included two contributing buildings.
