= New Mexico Tourism Department =

State agency of New Mexico

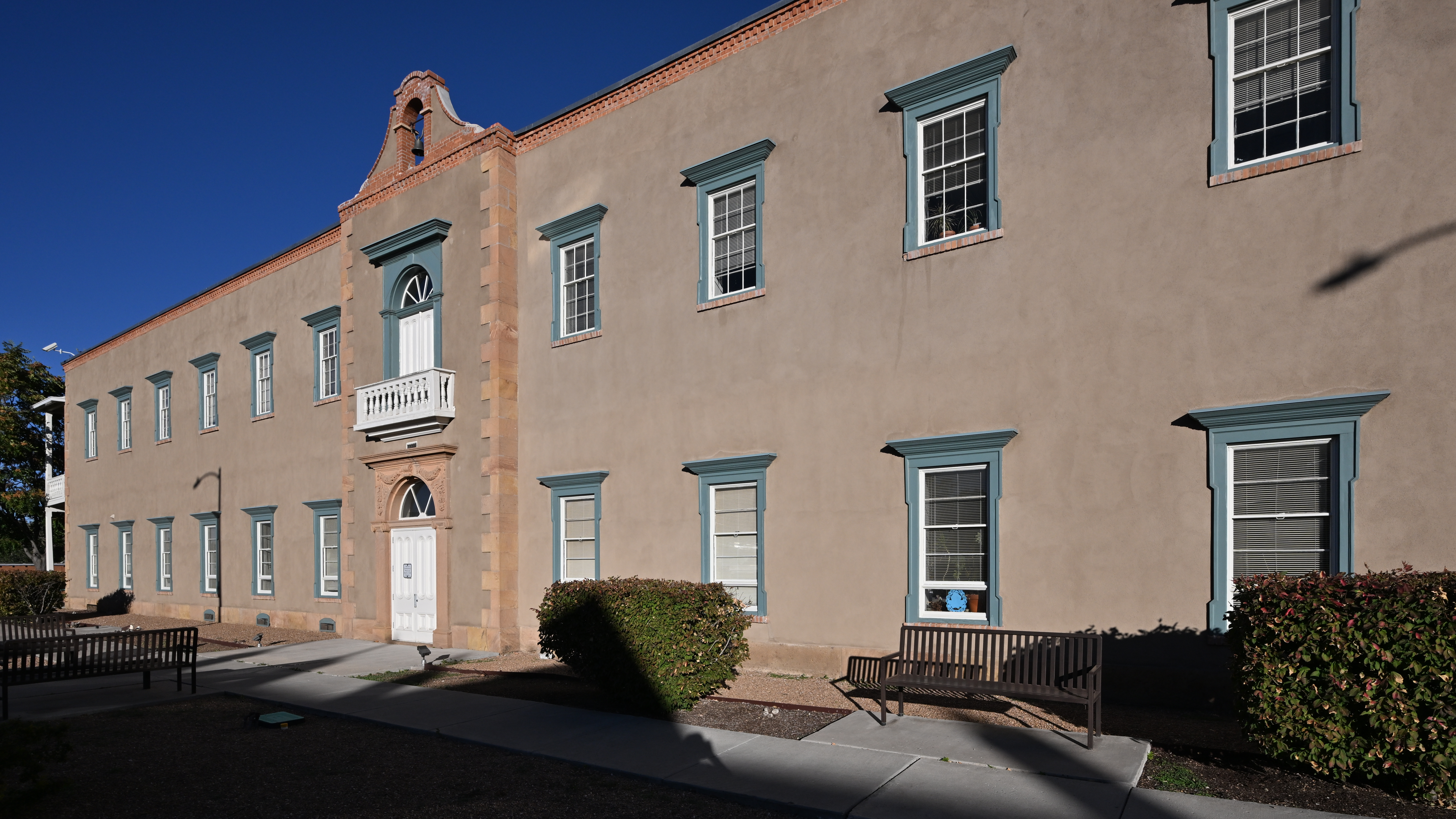
The Lamy Building, which has the department's headquarters

The New Mexico Tourism Department is a state agency of New Mexico, headquartered in the Lamy Building in Santa Fe. It publishes New Mexico Magazine and distributes New Mexico True Television.
