= List of New Mexico communities with Hispanic majority populations in the 2000 census =

The following is a list of cities, towns and census-designated places in New Mexico, USA, in which a majority of the population was Hispanic or Latino, according to data from the 2000 census.

== Places with between 25,000 and 100,000 people ==
- Las Cruces (51.7%)
- South Valley (77.6%)

== Places with between 10,000 and 25,000 people ==
- Deming (64.6%)
- Española (84.4%)
- Las Vegas (83.0%)
- Los Lunas (58.7%)
- North Valley (56.8%)
- Silver City (52.4%)
- Sunland Park (96.4%)

== Places with between 1,000 and 10,000 people ==
- Agua Fria (79.2%)
- Anthony (96.4%)
- Bayard (84.3%)
- Belen (68.6%)
- Bernalillo (74.8%)
- Carrizozo (53.5%)
- Chama (71.2%)
- Chaparral (64.5%)
- Chimayo (90.8%)
- Columbus (83.3%)
- Dexter (71.2%)
- Doña Ana (87.1%)
- El Cerro Mission (73.8%)
- El Valle de Arroyo Seco (70.0%)
- Estancia (50.6%)
- Grants (52.4%)
- Hagerman (63.2%)
- Hatch (79.2%)
- Hurley (60.3%)
- Jarales (64.6%)
- La Cienega (70.8%)
- La Puebla (79.9%)
- Lordsburg (74.4%)
- Los Chaves (54.1%)
- Los Trujillos-Gabaldon (62.5%)
- Loving (78.3%)
- Lovington (52.1%)
- Meadow Lake (57.9%)
- Mesilla (52.2%)
- Milan (52.3%)
- Mountainair (53.1%)
- Pecos (80.1%)
- Peralta (51.3%)
- Pojoaque (62.2%)
- Questa (80.5%)
- Ranchos de Taos (75.3%)
- Raton (57.0%)
- Santa Clara (83.5%)
- Santa Rosa (81.2%)
- Santa Teresa (55.6%)
- Socorro (54.5%)
- Springer (70.0%)
- Taos (54.3%)
- Tome-Adelino (63.4%)
- Tucumcari (51.4%)
- Tularosa (56.1%)
- Vado (95.0%)

== Places with fewer than 1,000 people ==
- Alcalde (89.1%)
- Algodones (73.4%)
- Carnuel (51.1%)
- Casa Colorada (73.2%)
- Chamisal (92.0%)
- Chilili (92.0%)
- Cimarron (58.9%)
- Cuartelez (86.1%)
- Cuba (60.3%)
- Cundiyo (87.4%)
- Cuyamungue (83.4%)
- El Rancho (70.3%)
- Encino (80.9%)
- Glorieta (56.0%)
- Jaconita (63.0%)
- La Jara (79.4%)
- Lake Arthur (70.1%)
- Los Cerrillos (50.7%)
- Magdalena (51.6%)
- Manzano (87.0%)
- Maxwell (55.5%)
- Mesquite (94.8%)
- Mosquero (77.5%)
- Pena Blanca (79.4%)
- Penasco (91.3%)
- Ponderosa (64.5%)
- Rincon (87.3%)
- Rio Chiquito (90.3%)
- Rio Lucio (93.4%)
- Roy (52.6%)
- Salem (94.1%)
- Santa Cruz (91.7%)
- San Ysidro (71.8%)
- Sombrillo (50.3%)
- Tajique (79.1%)
- Tijeras (56.3%)
- Torreon (68.9%)
- Vadito (93.1%)
- Vaughn (87.0%)
- Wagon Mound (87.8%)
- Willard (83.3%)

== See also ==
- List of U.S. communities with Hispanic majority populations
