= List of Indian reservations in New Mexico =

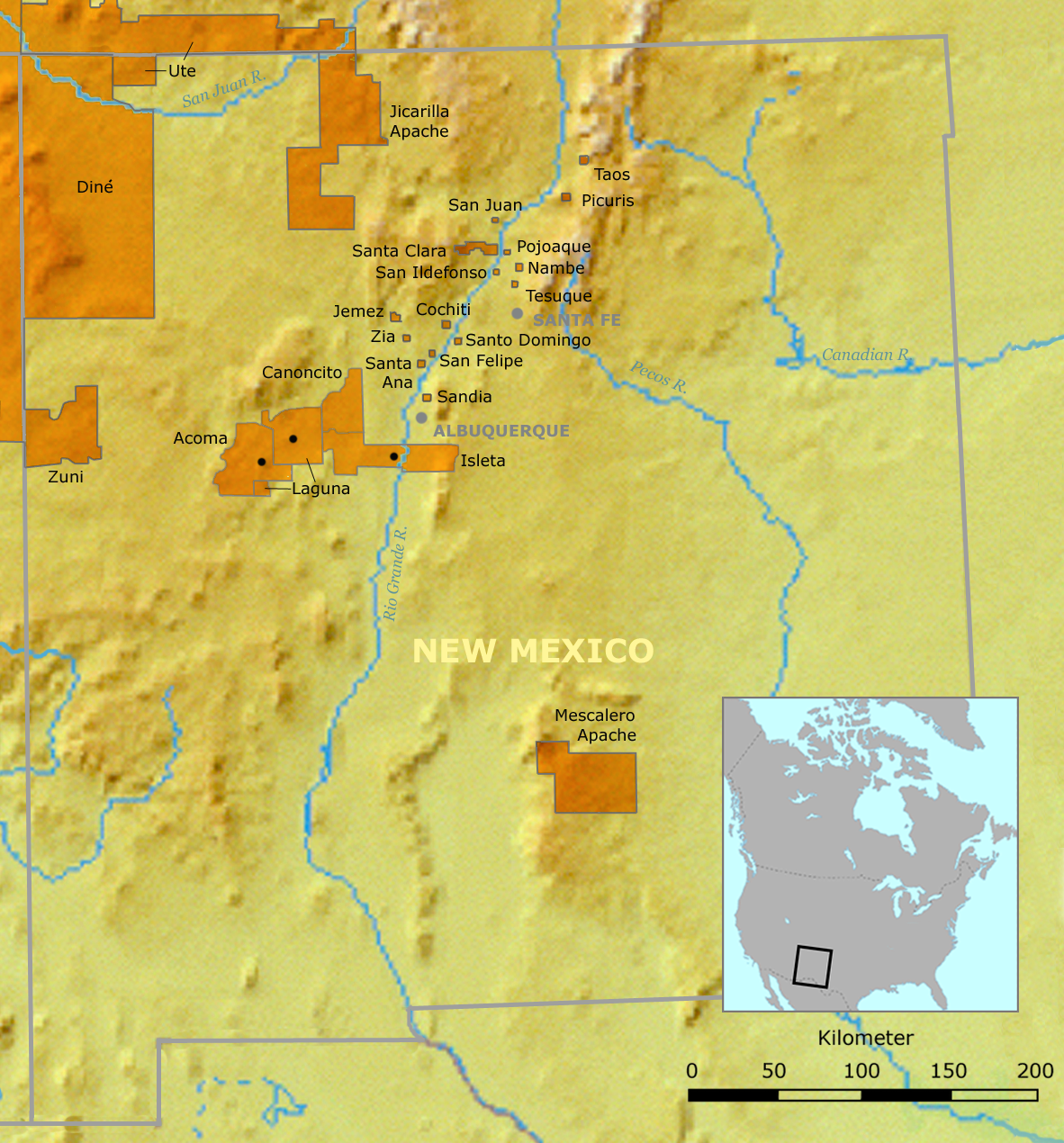
Reservations and Pueblos

This is a list of Indian reservations and Pueblos in the U.S. state of New Mexico.

== List of Reservations and Pueblos ==
Official name	Ethnicity	Endonym	Pop. (2010)	Area (Acres)	County(s)	Notes
Acoma Pueblo	Keres	Áakʼu	3,011	378,262	Cibola, Socorro, Catron	Includes the Acoma Pueblo.
Cochiti Pueblo	Keres	Kotyit	1,727	50,681	Sandoval	
Fort Sill Apache Reservation	Apache	—	650	30	Luna	Tribal jurisdiction area in Oklahoma but won rights to reservation in New Mexico in 2011. Members are from the Chiricahua.
Pueblo of Isleta	Tiwa	Shiewhibak	3,400	301,102	Bernalillo, Valencia	
Jemez Pueblo	Jemez	Walatowa	1,815	89,619	Sandoval	
Jicarilla Apache Nation	Apache	Dinde	3,254	879,917	Rio Arriba	
Santo Domingo (Kewa) Pueblo	Keres	Kewa / Díiwʾi	3,255	—	Sandoval	
Laguna Pueblo	Keres	Kawaika	4,043	495,442	Bernalillo, Cibola, Sandoval, Valencia	
Mescalero Apache Reservation	Apache	Naa'dahéõdé	3,613	460,769	Lincoln, Otero	
Nambe Pueblo	Tewa	Nąnbeˀ Ówîngeh	1,611	19,093	Santa Fe	One of the Eight Northern Pueblos.
Navajo Nation	Navajo	Diné	65,764	—	Bernalillo, Cibola, McKinley San Juan, Socorro	Includes Alamo, Ramah and Tohajiilee Reservations. Main reservation extends into Arizona (Apache, Coconino, Navajo) and Utah (San Juan)
Ohkay Owingeh Pueblo	Tewa	Ohkay Ówîngeh	6,309	12,236	Rio Arriba	One of the Eight Northern Pueblos.
Picuris Pueblo	Tiwa	P'įwweltha	1,886	15,034	Taos	One of the Eight Northern Pueblos.
Pojoaque Pueblo	Tewa	Pʼohsųwą̈geh Ówîngeh	3,316	12,004	Santa Fe	One of the Eight Northern Pueblos.
Sandia Pueblo	Tiwa	Tuf Shur Tia	4,965	22,890	Bernalillo, Sandoval	
San Felipe Pueblo	Keres	Katishtya	3,536	48,929	Sandoval	
San Ildefonso Pueblo	Tewa	Pʼohwhogeh Ówîngeh	1,752	28,179	Santa Fe	One of the Eight Northern Pueblos.
Santa Ana Pueblo	Keres	Tamaya	621	—	Sandoval	
Santa Clara Pueblo	Tewa	Khaˀpʼoe Ówîngeh	11,021	53,437	Rio Arriba, Sandoval, Santa Fe	Includes the Santa Clara Pueblo, one of the Eight Northern Pueblos.
Taos Pueblo	Tiwa	Tə̂otho	4,384	96,106	Taos	One of the Eight Northern Pueblos.
Tesuque Pueblo	Tewa	Teˀtsʼúgéh Ówîngeh	841	—	Santa Fe	One of the Eight Northern Pueblos.
Tortugas Pueblo	Piro/Manso/Tiwa	—	—	—	Doña Ana	Not a federally recognized reservation but is a pueblo built on land given to the Piro/Manso/Tiwa tribe in 1852.
Ute Mountain Ute Indian Reservation around 2,000 population	Ute	Wʉgama Núuchi	—	—	San Juan	Reservation is primarily located in Colorado (La Plata, Montezuma).
Zia Pueblo	Zia	Tsi'ya	737	121,613	Sandoval	
Zuni Indian Reservation	Zuni	A:shiwi	7,891	588,093	Catron, Cibola, McKinley	Includes the Zuni Pueblo. with portions extending into eastern Arizona.

== See also ==
- Pueblo peoples
- Ancestral Puebloans
- List of Ancestral Puebloan dwellings in New Mexico
- List of federally recognized tribes in New Mexico
- List of Indian reservations in the United States
