= Pueblo of Pojoaque =

Native American tribe and settlement in New Mexico

Pueblo of Pojoaque Pʼohsųwą̈geh Ówîngeh (Tewa)
- Pueblo
- Pueblo of Pojoaque
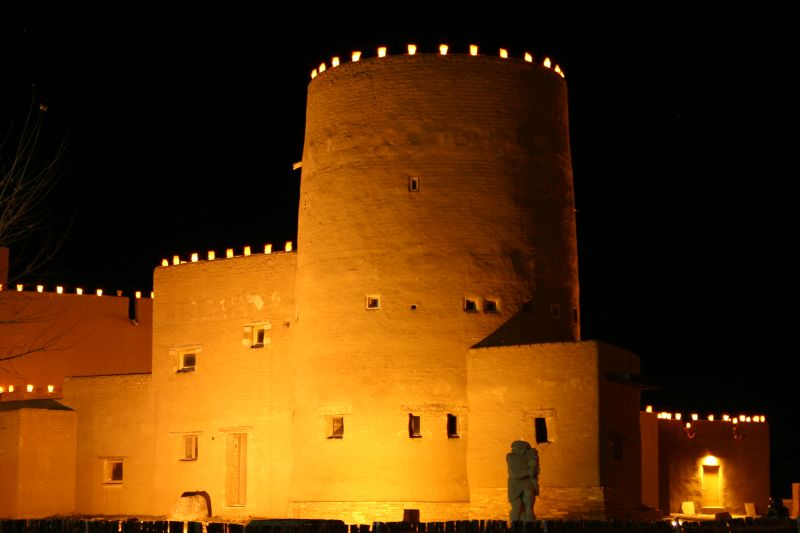
- Poeh museum

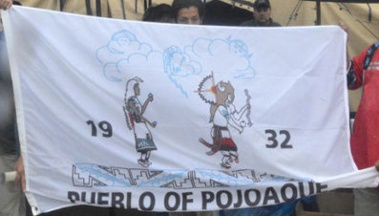
- Flag

- Location of Pojoaque, New Mexico.

- Location in the United States
- Coordinates: 35°53′26″N 106°0′34″W
- Country: United States
- State: New Mexico
- County: Santa Fe

Government
  - Governor: Jenelle Roybal
  - Lieutenant Governor: Jamie Viarrial

Area
  - Total: 4.37 sq mi (11.31 km^{2})
  - Land: 4.37 sq mi (11.31 km^{2})
  - Water: 0 sq mi (0.00 km^{2})
- Elevation: 5,883 ft (1,793 m)

Population (2020)
  - Total: 2,071
  - Density: 474.1/sq mi (183.06/km^{2})
- Time zone: UTC-7 (Mountain (MST))
  - Summer (DST): UTC-6 (MDT)
- ZIP code: 87506
- Area code: 505
- FIPS code: 35-58630
- GNIS feature ID: 2409085

The Pueblo of Pojoaque (Note: /pəˈwɑːkiː/ pə-WAH-kee) (Tewa: Pʼohsųwą̈geh Ówîngeh, (Note: also spelled P’o-suwae-geh, Po’su wae geh, or Posuwaegeh) pronounced [pʼòhsũ̀wæ̃̀ɡè ʔówîŋɡè], lit. 'water-drinking place village') is an Indian reservation in Santa Fe County, New Mexico, United States. It is part of the Santa Fe, New Mexico, Metropolitan Statistical Area.

The area includes the old town of the Pueblo of Pojoaque and the new town. As of the 2020 census, the town of Pojoaque had a population of 2,071. For statistical purposes, the United States Census Bureau has defined the Pueblo of Pojoaque as a census-designated place (CDP). The new town of Pojoaque is collection of communities near the pueblo with people from various ethnic backgrounds. The area of Pojoaque includes the neighborhoods of Cuyamungue, Jacona, Jaconita, Nambé and El Rancho.

== History ==
Pojoaque Pueblo is one of the six Tewa-speaking Rio Grande Pueblos, and a member of the Eight Northern Pueblos. The Pueblo was settled around 500 AD, with the population peaking in the 15th and 16th centuries. Tewa tradition describes Pojoaque as a "mother village" where their ancestors gathered before spreading across the Tewa Basin.

In the early 17th century, the first Spanish mission, San Francisco de Pojoaque was founded. During the Pueblo Revolt of 1680, Pojoaque was abandoned, and was not resettled until circa 1706. By 1712, the population had reached 79. During the revolt of 1837, New Mexico Governor Manuel Armijo defeated the rebels at Puertocito Pojoaque, east of Santa Cruz de la Cañada. In the early 1900s, the Pojoaque Valley School District was established to serve the educational needs of the valley.

Around 1900, a severe smallpox epidemic caused the pueblo to be abandoned once again by 1912. In 1934, Pojoaque Pueblo was reoccupied, and became a federally recognized Indian reservation in 1936.

Pojoaque Pueblo remains a major employer in the region, owning several business enterprises, including the gaming operations of three casino locations: Buffalo Thunder Resort, Cities of Gold Casino, and Jake's Casino. Prior to 2017, the New Mexico state gaming compacts signed by the pueblo expired, but the pueblo has continued gaming operations and resumed negotiations with the state of New Mexico.

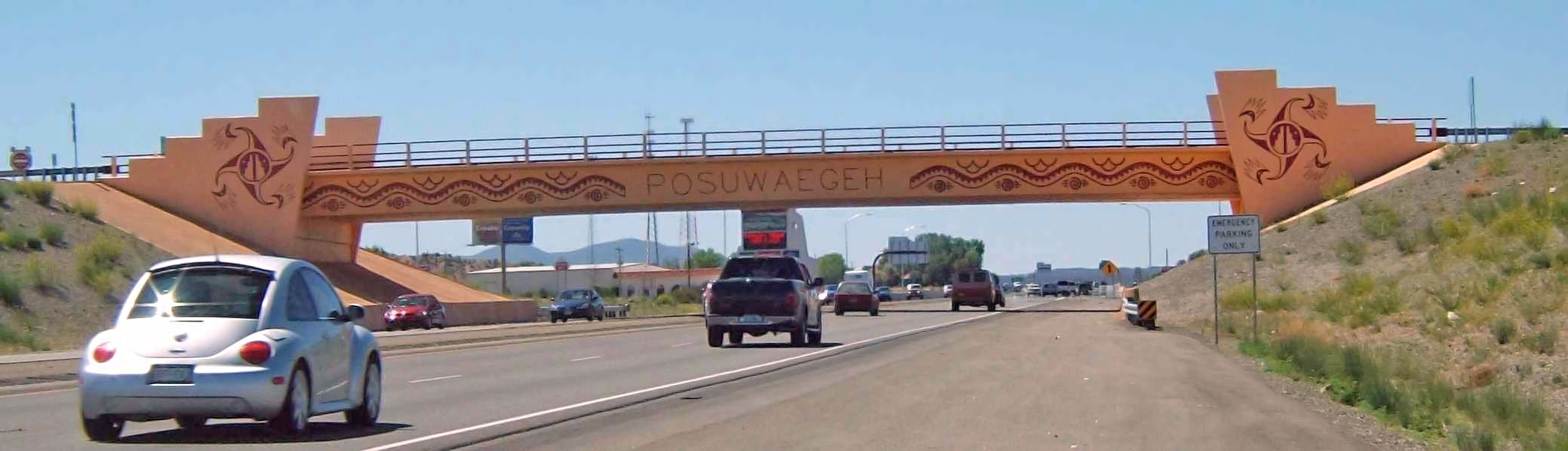
Overpass southeast of Pojoaque on Highway 84 renders the Tewa name of the pueblo as "Posuwaegeh"

== Geography ==
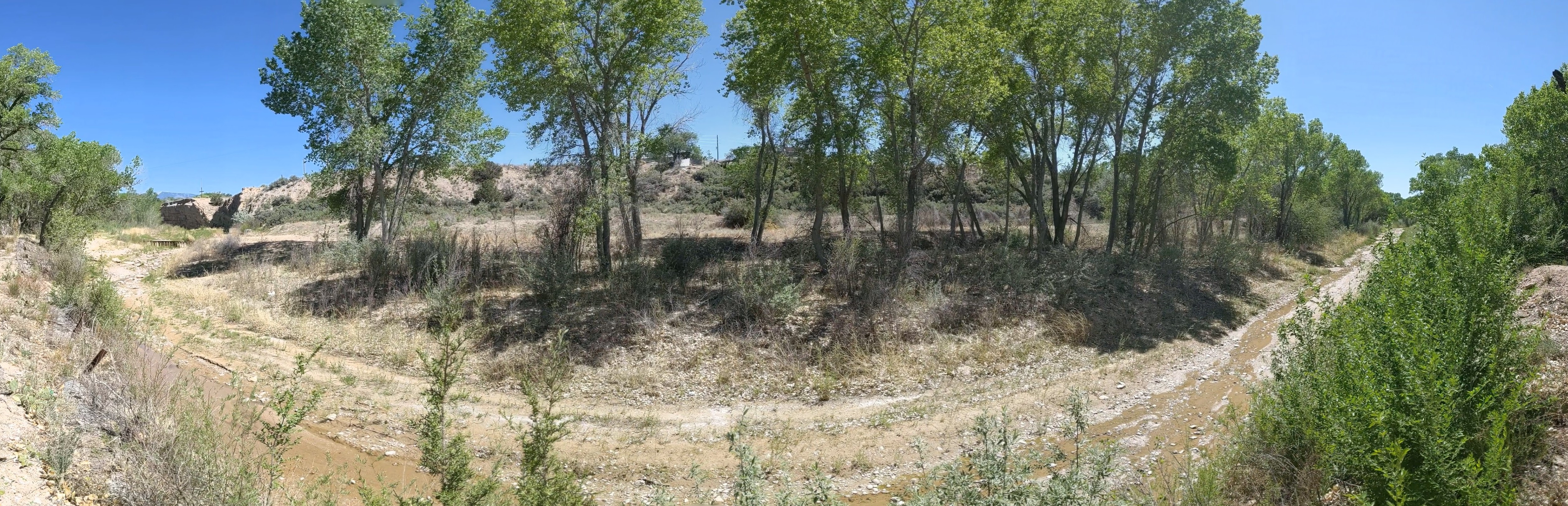
Pojoaque Creek where it approaches US highways 84/285 at Pojoaque Pueblo

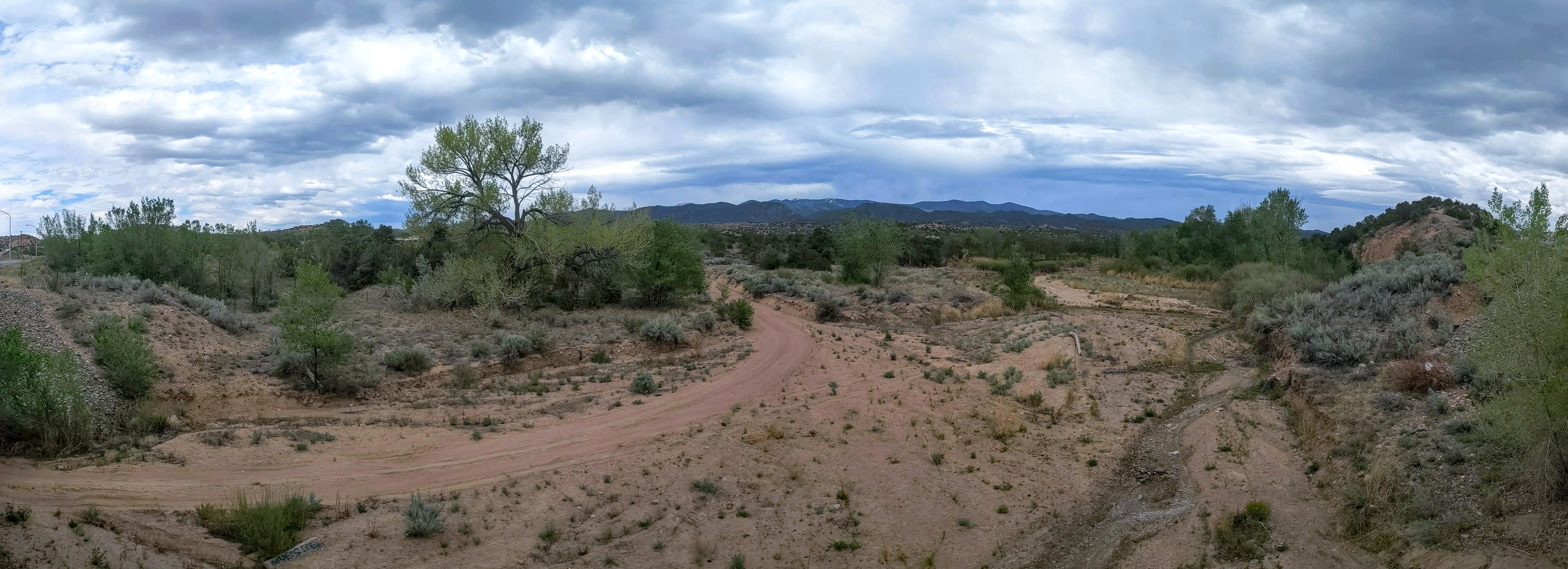
Tesuque Creek, a tributary of the Rio Tesuque, between Tesuque Pueblo and Tesuque, New Mexico, at US highways 84/285

According to the United States Census Bureau, the CDP has a total area of 2.9 square miles (7.5 km^{2}), all land.

Pojoaque Creek (Tewa: Nąnbeˀin P'oe Huuˀu) runs from the Sangre de Cristo Mountains from Nambé Lake westward. Passing through the pueblo, it joins the Rio Tesuque (Teˀtsʼúgéh P'oe Huuˀu) to form the Pojoaque River (Pʼohsųwą̈geˀin P'oe Huuˀu), which flows into the Rio Grande.

== Demographics ==
Historical population
Census	Pop.	Note	%±
2000	1,261		—
2010	1,907		51.2%
2020	2,071		8.6%
U.S. Decennial Census

=== 2020 census ===
As of the 2020 census, Pojoaque had a population of 2,071. The median age was 38.4 years. 22.9% of residents were under the age of 18 and 17.3% of residents were 65 years of age or older. For every 100 females, there were 96.7 males, and for every 100 females age 18 and over, there were 95.2 males age 18 and over.

0.0% of residents lived in urban areas, while 100.0% lived in rural areas.

There were 854 households in Pojoaque, of which 28.1% had children under the age of 18 living in them. Of all households, 34.3% were married-couple households, 22.6% were households with a male householder and no spouse or partner present, and 32.9% were households with a female householder and no spouse or partner present. About 34.6% of all households were made up of individuals, and 14.2% had someone living alone who was 65 years of age or older.

There were 925 housing units, of which 7.7% were vacant. The homeowner vacancy rate was 1.1% and the rental vacancy rate was 5.3%.

Racial composition as of the 2020 census
Race	Number	Percent
White	686	33.1%
Black or African American	10	0.5%
American Indian and Alaska Native	397	19.2%
Asian	11	0.5%
Native Hawaiian and Other Pacific Islander	0	0.0%
Some other race	375	18.1%
Two or more races	592	28.6%
Hispanic or Latino (of any race)	1,339	64.7%

=== 2000 census ===
As of the 2000 census, there were 1,261 people, 493 households, and 332 families residing in the CDP. The population density was 437.3 inhabitants per square mile (168.8/km^{2}). There were 533 housing units at an average density of 184.8 per square mile (71.4/km^{2}). The racial makeup of the CDP was 52.10% White, 0.56% African American, 17.37% Native American, 26.57% from other races, and 3.41% from two or more races. Hispanic or Latino of any race were 62.17% of the population.

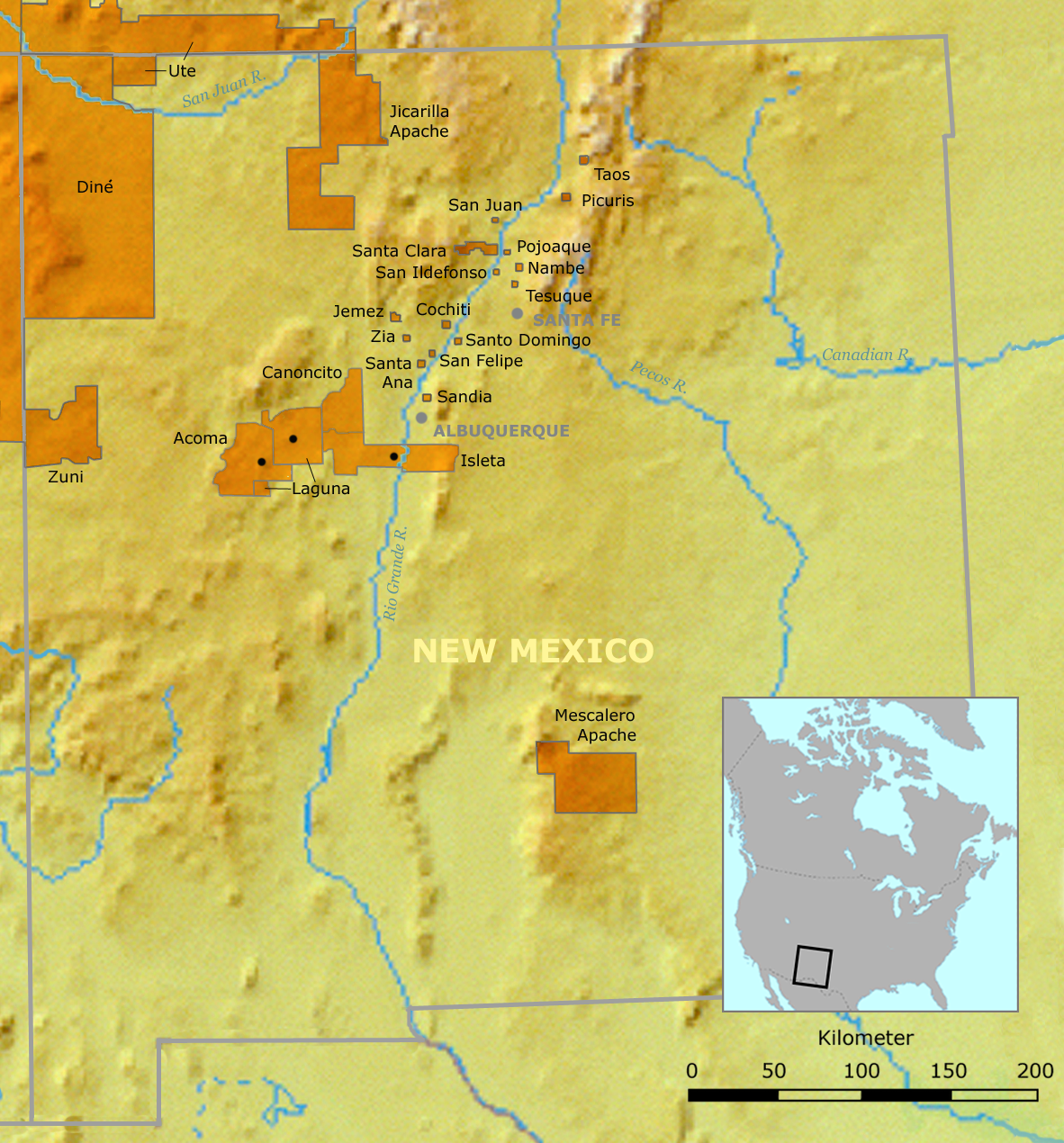
Location of Pojoaque Pueblo and neighboring pueblos in New Mexico

There were 493 households, out of which 38.3% had children under the age of 18 living with them, 46.7% were married couples living together, 13.0% had a female householder with no husband present, and 32.5% were non-families. 26.6% of all households were made up of individuals, and 6.9% had someone living alone who was 65 years of age or older. The average household size was 2.56 and the average family size was 3.10.

In the CDP, the population was spread out, with 28.9% under the age of 18, 9.3% from 18 to 24, 30.4% from 25 to 44, 23.3% from 45 to 64, and 8.1% who were 65 years of age or older. The median age was 34 years. For every 100 females, there were 103.1 males. For every 100 females age 18 and over, there were 101.3 males.

The median income for a household in the CDP was $15,875, and the median income for a family was $24,719. Males had a median income of $19,830 versus $17,105 for females. The per capita income for the CDP was $13,968. About 17.2% of families and 18.7% of the population were below the poverty line, including 23.4% of those under age 18 and 15.3% of those age 65 or over.

== Government ==
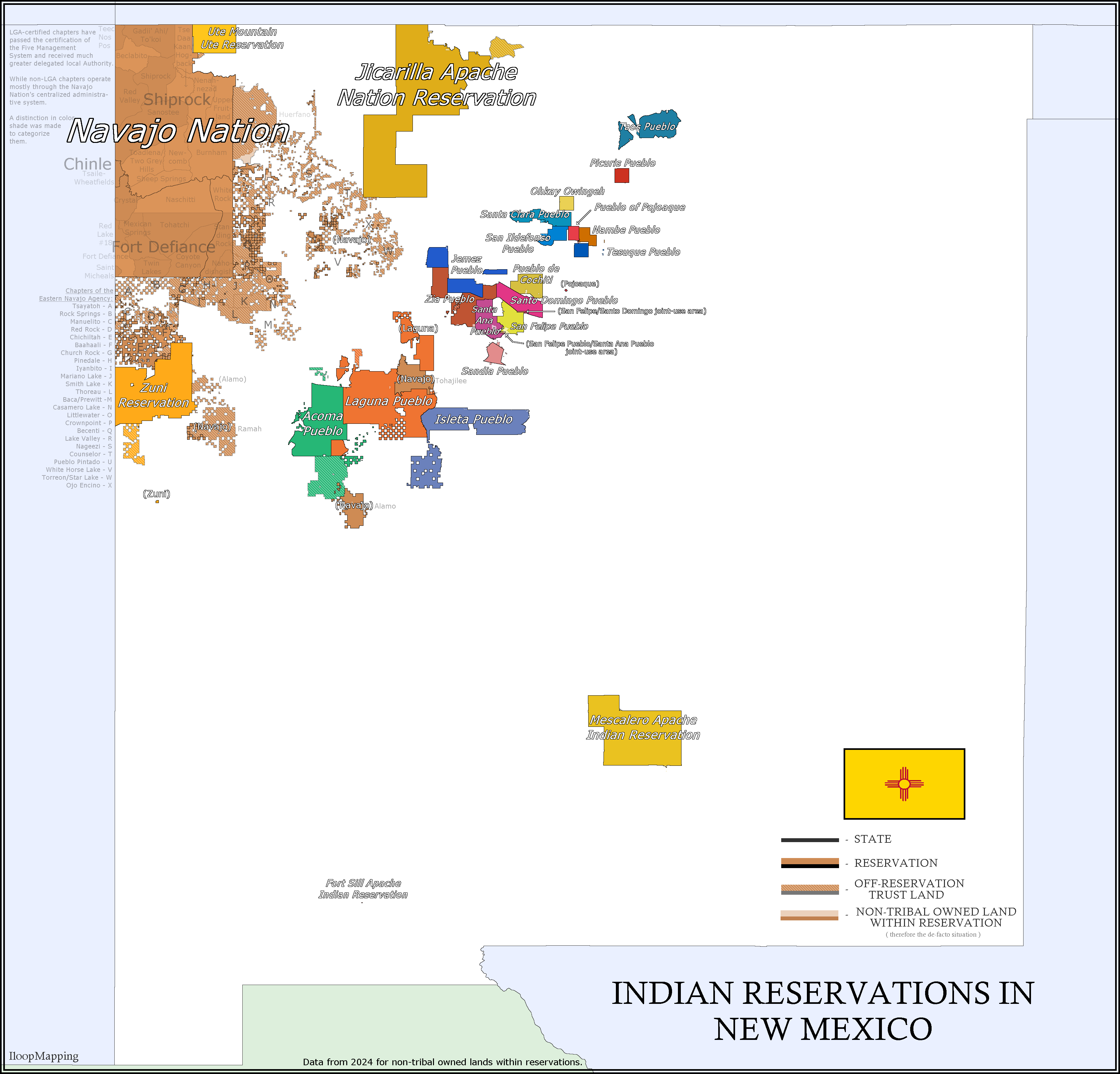
Map of the Pojoaque and neighbouring tribes (In bright red).

The Pueblo of Pojoaque operates a consensus based republic since time immemorial. There is a Tribal Council for the legislative branch, and a Governor heading the executive branch.

== Arts and culture ==
Pojoaque Pueblo opened the Poeh Museum in 1987, and the Cities of Gold Casino in the mid-1990s.

In 2008 the Pueblo opened the Buffalo Thunder resort and casino, New Mexico's largest and most expensive resort. The estimated cost for the resort project in 2004 was $250 million.

== Education ==
The Pojoaque Valley is served by the Pojoaque Valley School District, which administers several schools, teaching Kindergarten through twelfth grade:

- Pojoaque Valley High School
- Pojoaque Middle School
- Pojoaque Sixth Grade Academy
- Pojoaque Intermediate School
- Pablo Roybal Elementary School

Pojoaque Valley High School competes in the NMAA District 2AAAA in athletics.

== See also ==
- Poeh Center
