= Te Tsu Geh Oweenge Day School =

Native American school in New Mexico, United States

Coordinates: 35.7998°N 105.9725°W

Te Tsu Geh Oweenge School, also known as Te Tsu Geh Oweenge Community School, Te Tsu Geh Oweenge Day School, Tesuque Pueblo Day School, and Tesuque Day School, is a Bureau of Indian Education (BIE)-affiliated tribal school, located in Tesuque Pueblo, New Mexico. It has elementary school grades.

The school was formerly directly operated by the Bureau of Indian Affairs (BIA). It includes Tewa language instruction and emphasizes communitarian points of view.

== History ==
It first opened in the 1950s. The school was formerly directly operated by the Bureau of Indian Affairs (BIA).

In the period 1984-2003, the school had 14 people acting as principals. Circa 2003 it was common for teachers in the special education field to only work at this school for a short period of time.

By 2003, the campus included the main building and several temporary buildings. In 2002, the enrollment was 34, and in 2003, the enrollment was 19.

In the 1970s the school had multi-grade classrooms with free-form learning environments, and older students were expected to assist younger students. Food preparation was part of the curriculum.

== Campus ==
Its original building, made of adobe, was established in the 1930s and previously served as a residence for teachers. In 2015 James McGrath Morris wrote that the main building that year had a similar appearance to its original one.

In 1977 Rosanna Hall of the Santa Fe New Mexican stated that the school was given decor like that of a residential house. In 1987, the school had two buildings, with the main building having the library, kindergarten classes, and a class with grades 4–6. The cooking facility and a class with grades 1-3 were in the second building. Inez Russell of the Gannett News Service described the campus as "cozy". By 2003, the campus included the main building and several temporary buildings.

== Student matriculation ==
Some alumni, as of 1987, moved on to the public district-operated middle school of Pojoaque Valley Schools, while others moved on to Santa Fe Indian School, a BIA/BIE-operated secondary school.
