= Santa Cruz River (New Mexico) =

River in New Mexico, United States

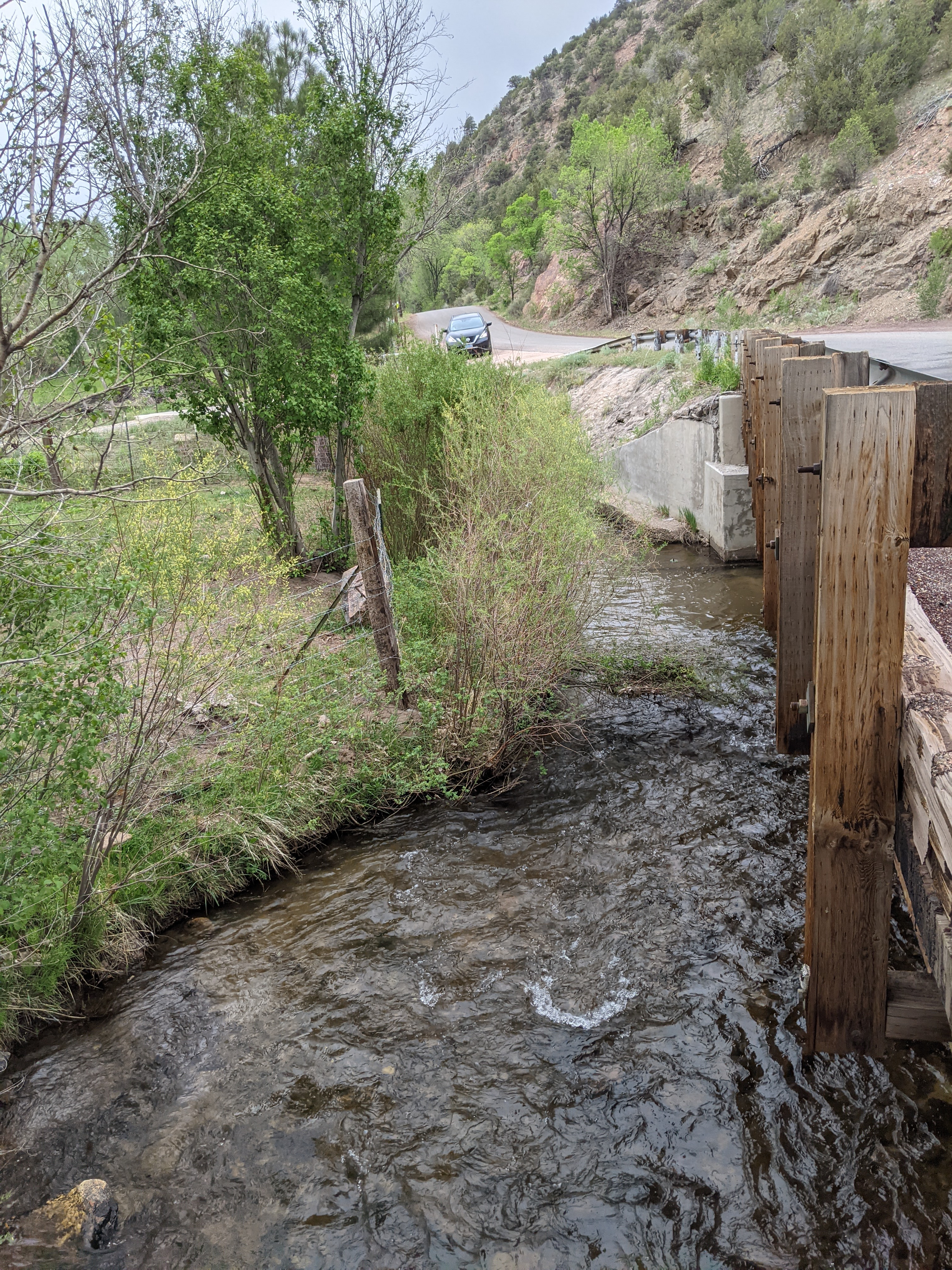
- The Rio Medio (foreground) and Rio Frijoles (background) flow together here to make the Santa Cruz River, which crosses to the right under New Mexico route 503 above Santa Cruz Lake.

- Location within New Mexico
- Native name: Tsímáyôeˀin P'oe Húuˀu (Tewa)

Location
- Country: United States
- State: New Mexico
- Counties: Rio Arriba, Santa Fe

Physical characteristics
- Source
  - location: Cundiyo, New Mexico
  - coordinates: 35.9650253°N 105.9047426°W
- Mouth
  - location: Espanola, New Mexico
  - coordinates: 35.9883567°N 106.0744679°W

Basin features
- River system: Rio Grande

The Santa Cruz River (Tewa: Tsímáyôeˀin P’oe Húuˀu) of New Mexico is a tributary of the Rio Grande at Española, New Mexico. The Santa Cruz River valley is the site of El Santuario de Chimayo, a mission chapel built by early Spanish colonists of the Santa Fe area.

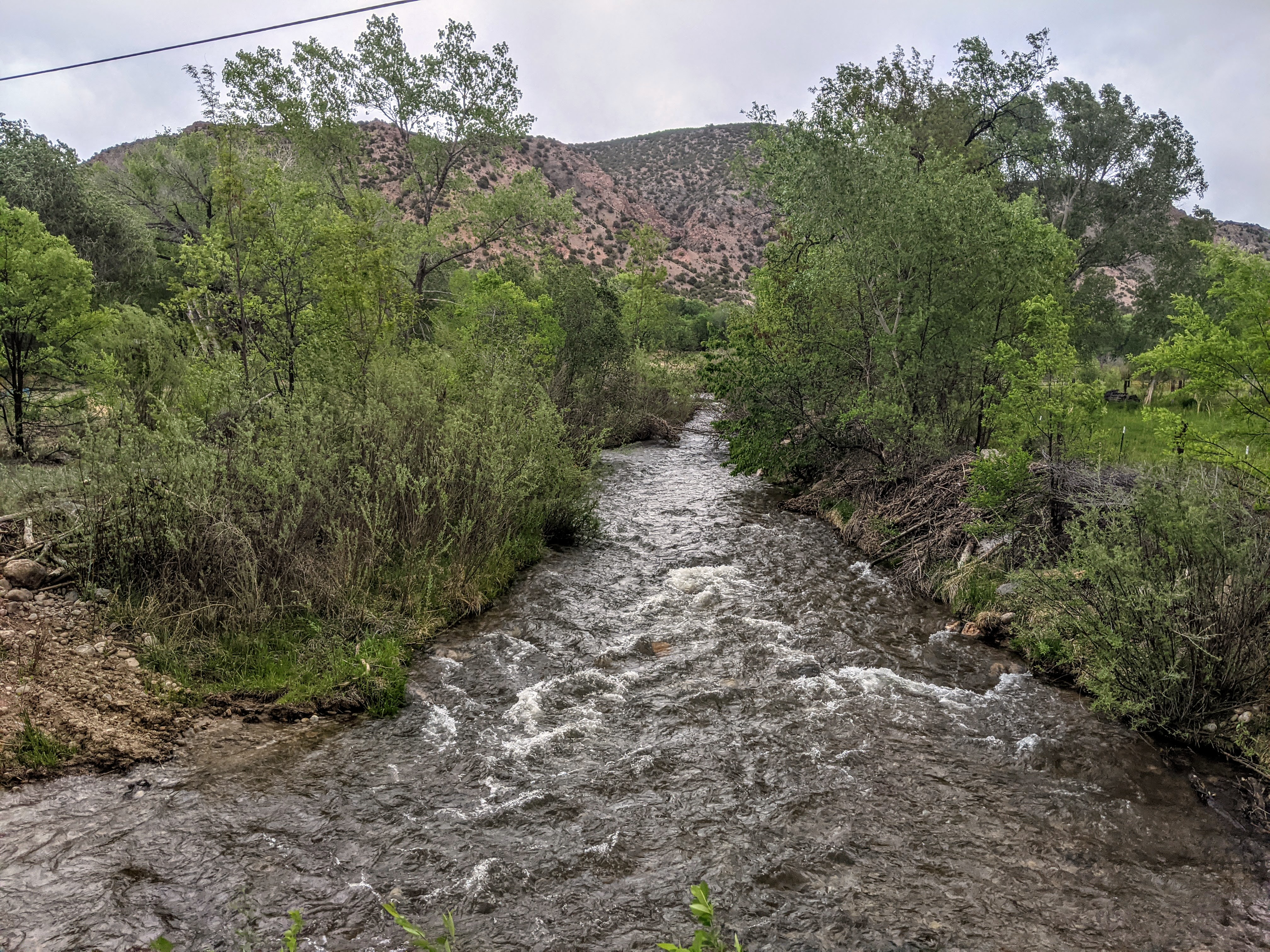
Santa Cruz River at NM 98 below the Rio Quemado confluence, looking east

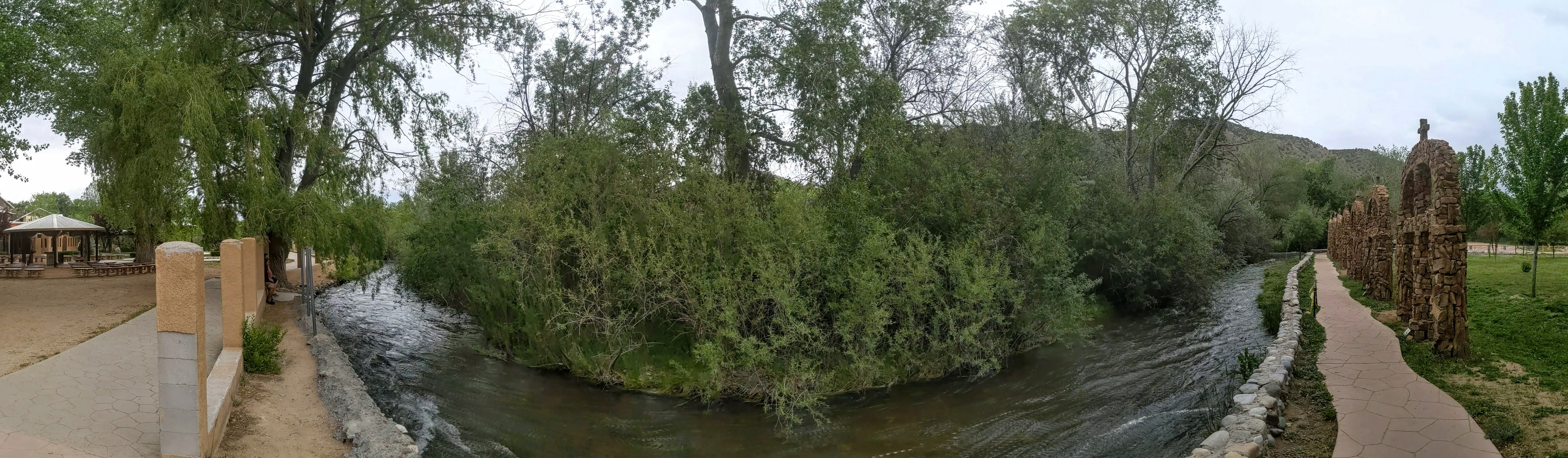
Panoramic view of the Santa Cruz River behind El Santuario de Chimayo, Santa Fe County, New Mexico
