= Eight Northern Pueblos =

Indigenous villages in Northern New Mexico

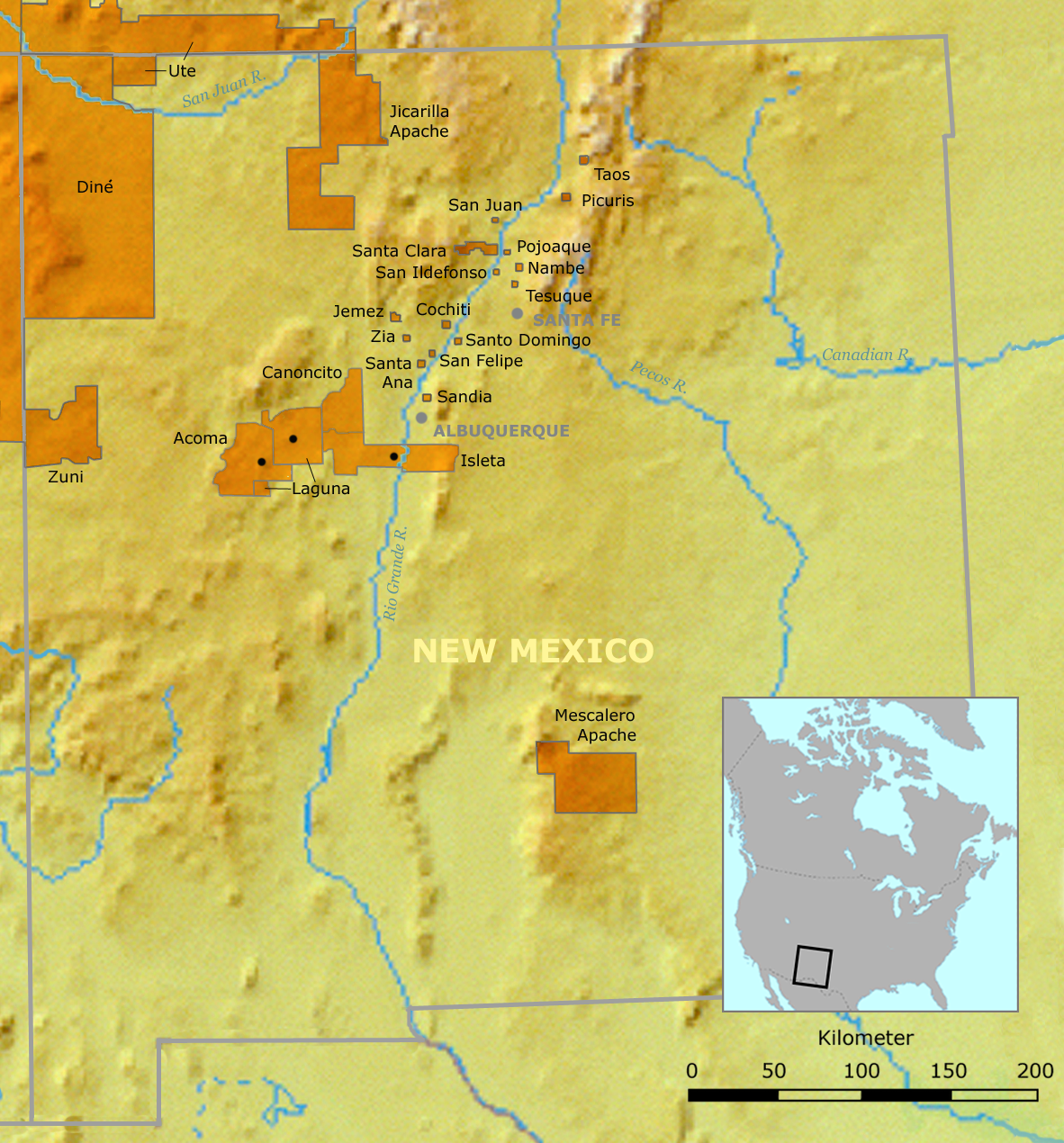
Location of Eight Northern Pueblos and neighboring pueblos in New Mexico

The Eight Northern Pueblos of New Mexico are Taos, Picuris, Ohkay Owingeh (formerly San Juan), Santa Clara, San Ildefonso, Nambé, Pojoaque, and Tesuque.

Taos and Picuris are Tiwa-speaking pueblos; the rest speak Tewa. Tiwa and Tewa are closely related languages of the Tanoan language family. These pueblos make up the Eight Northern Indian Pueblos Council, which sponsors events and advocates for the legal interests of associated pueblos. The capital of the Eight Northern Pueblos is located in Ohkay Owingeh, New Mexico. Ohkay Owingeh was formerly known as San Juan, but reverted to its original Tewa name in 2005.

== See also ==
- List of dwellings of Pueblo peoples
