= Cuyamungue, New Mexico =

Cuyamungue, New Mexico Kʼuuyemųgéh (Tewa)
- Census-designated place
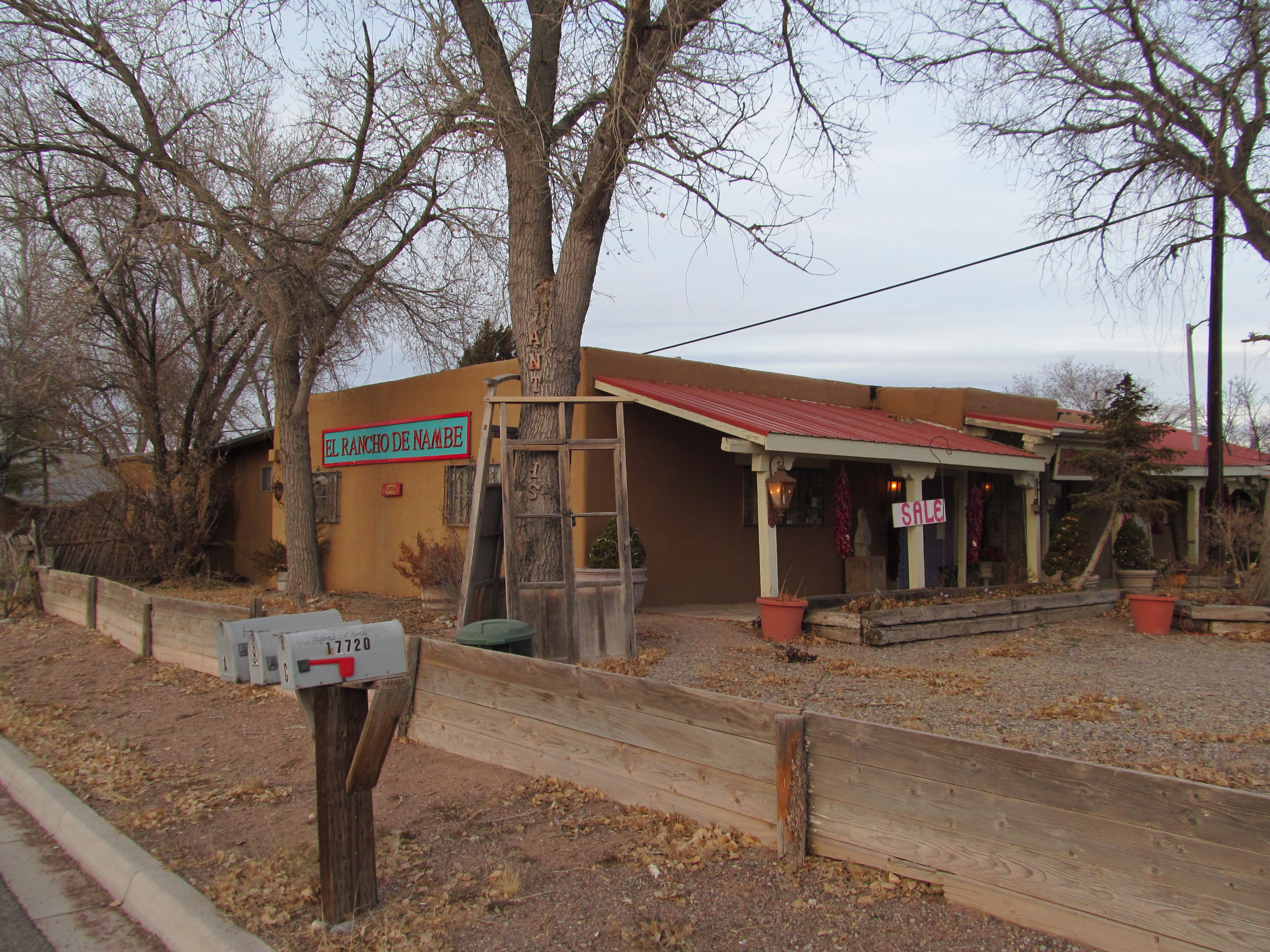
- El Rancho de Nambe, February 2012

- Location of Cuyamungue, New Mexico

- Location in New Mexico Location in the United States
- Coordinates: 35°51′50″N 106°00′30″W
- Country: United States
- State: New Mexico
- County: Santa Fe

Area
  - Total: 1.17 sq mi (3.02 km^{2})
  - Land: 1.17 sq mi (3.02 km^{2})
  - Water: 0 sq mi (0.00 km^{2})
- Elevation: 5,971 ft (1,820 m)

Population (2020)
  - Total: 534
  - Density: 457.9/sq mi (176.78/km^{2})
- Time zone: UTC−7 (Mountain (MST))
  - Summer (DST): UTC−6 (MDT)
- ZIP Code: 87501
- Area code: 505
- FIPS code: 35-19640
- GNIS feature ID: 2408638

Cuyamungue (Note: /ˌkuːjəˈmuːŋɡeɪ/ KOO-yə-MOONG-gay) (Tewa: Kʼuuyemųgéh, pronounced [kʼuːyemũɡé], lit. 'rock throw down place') is a census-designated place (CDP) in Santa Fe County, New Mexico, United States. It is part of the Santa Fe, New Mexico Metropolitan Statistical Area. As of the 2020 census, Cuyamungue had a population of 534.

== Geography ==
According to the United States Census Bureau, the CDP has a total area of 1.2 square miles (3.1 km^{2}), all land.

== Etymology ==
The Tewa-language etymon Kʼuuyemųgéh (kʼuu 'rock' + yemu 'fall' + géh 'over at') translates roughly to "place where rocks were thrown down", referring to a sandstone scree along the ridge east of the modern settlement. An early Spanish spelling of the name, Cullamunque, was recorded by the Public Record Office of New Spain dated August 23, 1719.

== History ==
The ridge overlooking modern Cuyamungue was the site of Kʼuuyemųgéh Ówîngeh Kayyee, an ancestral Tewa pueblo active from at around 1150 to 1696 CE. Archaeological evidence indicates a dual village structure associated with the two Tewa moieties and suggests the pueblo's population peaked in the late 1300s at around 700 people, declining from that point on.ref name="Bernstein & Ortman 2020"/> After the Spanish entrada, the pueblo was a visita of the church at Nambé. The town participated in the Pueblo Revolt and resisted the subsequent Spanish reconquest, with its inhabitants finally leaving for Pojoaque and Taos Pueblos during the failed second revolt of 1696.

Don Diego de Vargas visited Cuyamungue in September 1692.

== Demographics ==
Historical population
Census	Pop.	Note	%±
2020	534		—
U.S. Decennial Census

As of the census of 2000, there were 421 people, 154 households, and 121 families residing in the CDP. The population density was 1,045.8 inhabitants per square mile (403.8/km^{2}). There were 165 housing units at an average density of 409.9 per square mile (158.3/km^{2}). The racial makeup of the CDP was 61.05% White, 1.90% Native American, 31.59% from other races, and 5.46% from two or more races. Hispanic or Latino of any race were 83.37% of the population.

There were 154 households, out of which 39.6% had children under the age of 18 living with them, 59.7% were married couples living together, 14.3% had a female householder with no husband present, and 20.8% were non-families. 14.9% of all households were made up of individuals, and 3.9% had someone living alone who was 65 years of age or older. The average household size was 2.73 and the average family size was 3.00.

In the CDP, the population was spread out, with 26.4% under the age of 18, 8.6% from 18 to 24, 32.1% from 25 to 44, 21.1% from 45 to 64, and 11.9% who were 65 years of age or older. The median age was 36 years. For every 100 females, there were 89.6 males. For every 100 females age 18 and over, there were 90.2 males.

The median income for a household in the CDP was $43,958, and the median income for a family was $47,969. Males had a median income of $41,000 versus $29,196 for females. The per capita income for the CDP was $18,887. About 3.6% of families and 7.8% of the population were below the poverty line, including 11.4% of those under age 18 and 7.0% of those age 65 or over.

== Education ==
It is zoned to Pojoaque Valley Schools. Pojoaque Valley High School is the zoned comprehensive high school.

== See also ==
- List of census-designated places in New Mexico
