= Pojoaque Valley Public Schools =

School district in New Mexico, US

Location
- Northern New Mexico; Northern Santa Fe County United States

District information
- Type: Public
- Motto: Bound by unity and commitment, we are strengthening our future, one student at a time.
- Grades: K-12
- Superintendent: Matthew Nagle (interim)

Students and staff
- Students: 1,964
- Colors: Kelly Green/White

Other information
- Slogan: "Home of the Elks and Elkettes!"
- Website: www.pvs.k12.nm.us

Pojoaque Valley Public Schools is a school district with its headquarters in an unincorporated area in Santa Fe County, New Mexico, United States, with a Santa Fe, New Mexico post office address.

Pojoaque Valley Schools serves the Pojoaque Valley area in northern Santa Fe County; it does not include any portions of Santa Fe proper. The district has one high school, one middle school, one intermediate school, and one elementary school.

== Service area ==
The district serves Cundiyo, Cuyamungue, Cuyamungue Grant, El Rancho, Jacona, Jaconita, Nambe, Pojoaque, San Ildefonso Pueblo, Tesuque Pueblo, most of El Valle de Arroyo Seco, most of Peak Place, a portion of La Tierra, and a portion of Tano Road.

== School Board ==
Name	Position
Adam Muller	President
Jerome Lujan	Vice President
Susan Quintana	Secretary
Felix Benavidez	Member
Toby Velasquez	Member

== Schools ==
- Pojoaque Valley High School (9-12)
- Pojoaque Valley Middle School/Sixth Grade Academy (6-8)
- Pojoaque Valley Intermediate School (4-5)
- Pablo Roybal Elementary School (K-3)

The elementary, intermediate, and high schools are on the Jacona campus. This campus, which also has the administration building, is near but not inside the Jacona census-designated place and has a Santa Fe, New Mexico postal address (but it is not in Santa Fe).

The sixth grade academy/middle school are on the Pojoaque Campus, which is in the Pojoaque CDP. In the 1990 U.S. census and the 2000 U.S. census, this area was in the Jaconita CDP.

In 2006, the board of trustees voted to approve the design of an intermediate school which was to be built.
