= Cuyamungue Grant, New Mexico =

- Unincorporated community
- Location within New Mexico
- Coordinates: 35°50′49″N 106°00′05″W
- Country: United States
- State: New Mexico
- County: Santa Fe

Area
  - Total: 2.55 sq mi (6.60 km^{2})
  - Land: 2.55 sq mi (6.60 km^{2})
  - Water: 0 sq mi (0.00 km^{2})
- Elevation: 6,126 ft (1,867 m)

Population (2020)
  - Total: 184
  - Density: 72.2/sq mi (27.86/km^{2})
- Time zone: UTC-7 (Mountain (MST))
  - Summer (DST): UTC-6 (MDT)
- Area code: 505
- GNIS feature ID: 2584086

Cuyamungue Grant is an unincorporated community and census-designated place in Santa Fe County, New Mexico, United States. As of the 2020 census, Cuyamungue Grant had a population of 184.

== Geography ==
According to the U.S. Census Bureau, it has an area of 2.536 square miles (6.57 km^{2}), all land.

== Demographics ==
Historical population
Census	Pop.	Note	%±
2020	184		—
U.S. Decennial Census

== Education ==
It is zoned to Pojoaque Valley Schools. Pojoaque Valley High School is the zoned comprehensive high school.
