= Jacona, New Mexico =

Jacona, New Mexico Sakǫną̈ (Tewa)
- Unincorporated community
- Location within New Mexico
- Coordinates: 35°53′19″N 106°02′19″W
- Country: United States
- State: New Mexico
- County: Santa Fe

Area
  - Total: 0.85 sq mi (2.19 km^{2})
  - Land: 0.85 sq mi (2.19 km^{2})
  - Water: 0 sq mi (0.00 km^{2})
- Elevation: 5,788 ft (1,764 m)

Population (2020)
  - Total: 400
  - Density: 472.2/sq mi (182.33/km^{2})
- Time zone: UTC-7 (Mountain (MST))
  - Summer (DST): UTC-6 (MDT)
- Area code: 505
- GNIS feature ID: 2584115

Jacona is an unincorporated community and census-designated place in Santa Fe County, New Mexico, United States. As of the 2020 census, Jacona had a population of 400.

The name is a Spanish approximation of Sakǫną̈, the Tewa name of a pueblo within the community which was abandoned in 1696.

== Geography ==
According to the U.S. Census Bureau, the community has an area of 0.847 square miles (2.19 km^{2}), all land.

== Demographics ==
Historical population
Census	Pop.	Note	%±
2020	400		—
U.S. Decennial Census

== Education ==
It is zoned to Pojoaque Valley Schools. Pojoaque Valley High School is the zoned comprehensive high school.
