= La Tierra, New Mexico =

- Census-designated place
- Location within New Mexico Location within the United States
- Coordinates: 35°45′12″N 106°01′20″W
- Country: United States
- State: New Mexico
- County: Santa Fe

Area
  - Total: 9.81 sq mi (25.41 km^{2})
  - Land: 9.81 sq mi (25.41 km^{2})
  - Water: 0 sq mi (0.00 km^{2})
- Elevation: 6,677 ft (2,035 m)

Population (2020)
  - Total: 312
  - Density: 31.8/sq mi (12.28/km^{2})
- Time zone: UTC-7 (Mountain (MST))
  - Summer (DST): UTC-6 (MDT)
- ZIP Code: 87506 (Santa Fe)
- Area code: 505
- FIPS code: 35-40074
- GNIS feature ID: 2806763

La Tierra is a census-designated place (CDP) in Santa Fe County, New Mexico, United States. It was first listed as a CDP prior to the 2020 census. As of the 2020 census, La Tierra had a population of 312.

The CDP is in northern Santa Fe County. It is bordered to the east and southeast by Tano Road and to the southwest by Las Campanas. It is 8 miles (13 km) northwest of Santa Fe, the state capital.

== Demographics ==
Historical population
Census	Pop.	Note	%±
2020	312		—
U.S. Decennial Census

== Education ==
Much of La Tierra within Santa Fe Public Schools while some is in Pojoaque Valley Public Schools. Pojoaque Valley High School is the zoned school for Pojoaque Valley.
