= Cundiyo, New Mexico =

Cundiyo, New Mexico Kųdiyó Kwą̈́k’ųˀi (Tewa)
- CDP
- Location of Cundiyo, New Mexico

- Location in the United States
- Coordinates: 35°57′39″N 105°54′03″W
- Country: United States
- State: New Mexico
- County: Santa Fe

Area
  - Total: 0.95 sq mi (2.45 km^{2})
  - Land: 0.95 sq mi (2.45 km^{2})
  - Water: 0 sq mi (0.00 km^{2})
- Elevation: 6,683 ft (2,037 m)

Population (2020)
  - Total: 144
  - Density: 152/sq mi (58.8/km^{2})
- Time zone: UTC-7 (Mountain (MST))
  - Summer (DST): UTC-6 (MDT)
- Area code: 505
- FIPS code: 35-19500
- GNIS feature ID: 2408633

Cundiyo is a census-designated place (CDP) in Santa Fe County, New Mexico, United States. It is part of the Santa Fe, New Mexico Metropolitan Statistical Area. As of the 2020 census, Cundiyo had a population of 144.

The name Cundiyo comes from Tewa Kųdiyó but is of unexplained meaning. The ruins of Kųdiyó Ówîngeh Kayyee, a settlement claimed as ancestral by Nambé Pueblo, is found at the town.

== Geography ==
According to the United States Census Bureau, the CDP has a total area of 0.5 square miles (1.3 km^{2}), all land.

== Demographics ==
Historical population
Census	Pop.	Note	%±
2020	144		—
U.S. Decennial Census

As of the census of 2000, there were 95 people, 39 households, and 26 families residing in the CDP. The population density was 191.5 inhabitants per square mile (73.9/km^{2}). There were 42 housing units at an average density of 84.7 per square mile (32.7/km^{2}). The racial makeup of the CDP was 53.68% White, 41.05% from other races, and 5.26% from two or more races. Hispanic or Latino of any race were 87.37% of the population.

There were 39 households, out of which 35.9% had children under the age of 18 living with them, 51.3% were married couples living together, 10.3% had a female householder with no husband present, and 30.8% were non-families. 30.8% of all households were made up of individuals, and 12.8% had someone living alone who was 65 years of age or older. The average household size was 2.44 and the average family size was 2.93.

In the CDP, the population was spread out, with 27.4% under the age of 18, 4.2% from 18 to 24, 32.6% from 25 to 44, 22.1% from 45 to 64, and 13.7% who were 65 years of age or older. The median age was 38 years. For every 100 females, there were 111.1 males. For every 100 females age 18 and over, there were 97.1 males.

The median income for a household in the CDP was $48,654, and the median income for a family was $48,654. Males had a median income of $36,250 versus $18,750 for females. The per capita income for the CDP was $18,722. There were 13.6% of families and 14.2% of the population living below the poverty line, including 31.4% of under eighteens and none of those over 64.

== Education ==
It is zoned to Pojoaque Valley Schools. Pojoaque Valley High School is the zoned comprehensive high school.
