= Lonnie Vigil =

American potter (born 1949)

- Born: 1949 (age 76–77)
- Education: Eastern New Mexico University
- Known for: Pottery

Lonnie Vigil (born 1949) is an American potter. He is self-taught and from Nambé Pueblo, New Mexico.

== Early life, education and early career ==
Vigil grew up at Nambé Pueblo, New Mexico. He began his career as a financial and business consultant in New Mexico and Washington, D.C. after earning a business degree from Eastern New Mexico University, located in Portales, New Mexico. But by the early 1980s, he began to realize that his life in Washington gave him "nothing to feed his soul". A performance of film, music, drama, and dance called "Night of the First Americans" which he attended on March 4, 1982 at the Kennedy Center in Washington, D.C., inspired him to return to New Mexico, where he began working exclusively as a micaceous clay potter.

== Art career ==
Vigil is singularly credited with reviving unpainted, micaceous pottery and establishing its credibility as a contemporary art form. He defines himself as a "PhD" in his field.

An expert in micaceous clay pottery, he takes classic ceramic techniques and refines them to push the medium beyond the expected norms.

He works primarily in micaceous clay, which is characterized by its sparkling mica flecks, using Nambe clay and slip and traditional outdoor firing techniques. He hand-gathers the clay for each of his pieces, adding sand to make it workable.

Like many contemporary ceramic artists in the American Southwest, Vigil preserves the traditions of his culture while pursuing his own creative initiatives. His artworks reflect the style of his ancestors – hand-built forms used for cooking and storage.

He attributes his success as an artist to the guidance of his great-grandmother, Perfilia Anaya Pena, and great-aunts, who are also potters.

For him, each instance of making a pot is an encounter with Earth Mother and with his Nambe pueblo ancestors who worked the clay before him. He believes that each pot "speaks to the continuity in the identity of family and community", but is simultaneously an act of connection between the potter, Earth Mother, and the ancestral spirits that guide them.

=== Creative process ===
"There is collaboration between the clay and myself – the clay tells me what direction to take. I let the pot dry in the house for a day or two, then take it outside, and smooth the surface. My pots are traditional, and I follow the techniques of my ancestors – except for the asymmetricals I have created. In the past, Pueblo people cooked in clay, using pots for everything. It is not that common anymore; they mostly use them for special occasions."
–Lonnie Vigil

== Notable collections ==
- Peabody Essex Museum, Salem, Massachusetts
- Nelson-Atkins Museum of Art, Kansas City, Missouri

== Awards ==
- Ronald and Susan Dublin Fellowship, School for Advanced Research, 1994
- Native Treasures 2010 Living Treasure Award, Native Treasures: Indian Arts Festival, 2010
- "Best in Show", 2001 Santa Fe Indian Market

== See also ==
- List of American artists
- List of people from New Mexico
