= Jaconita, New Mexico =

Jaconita, New Mexico Sakǫną̈ˀe (Tewa)
- Census-designated place
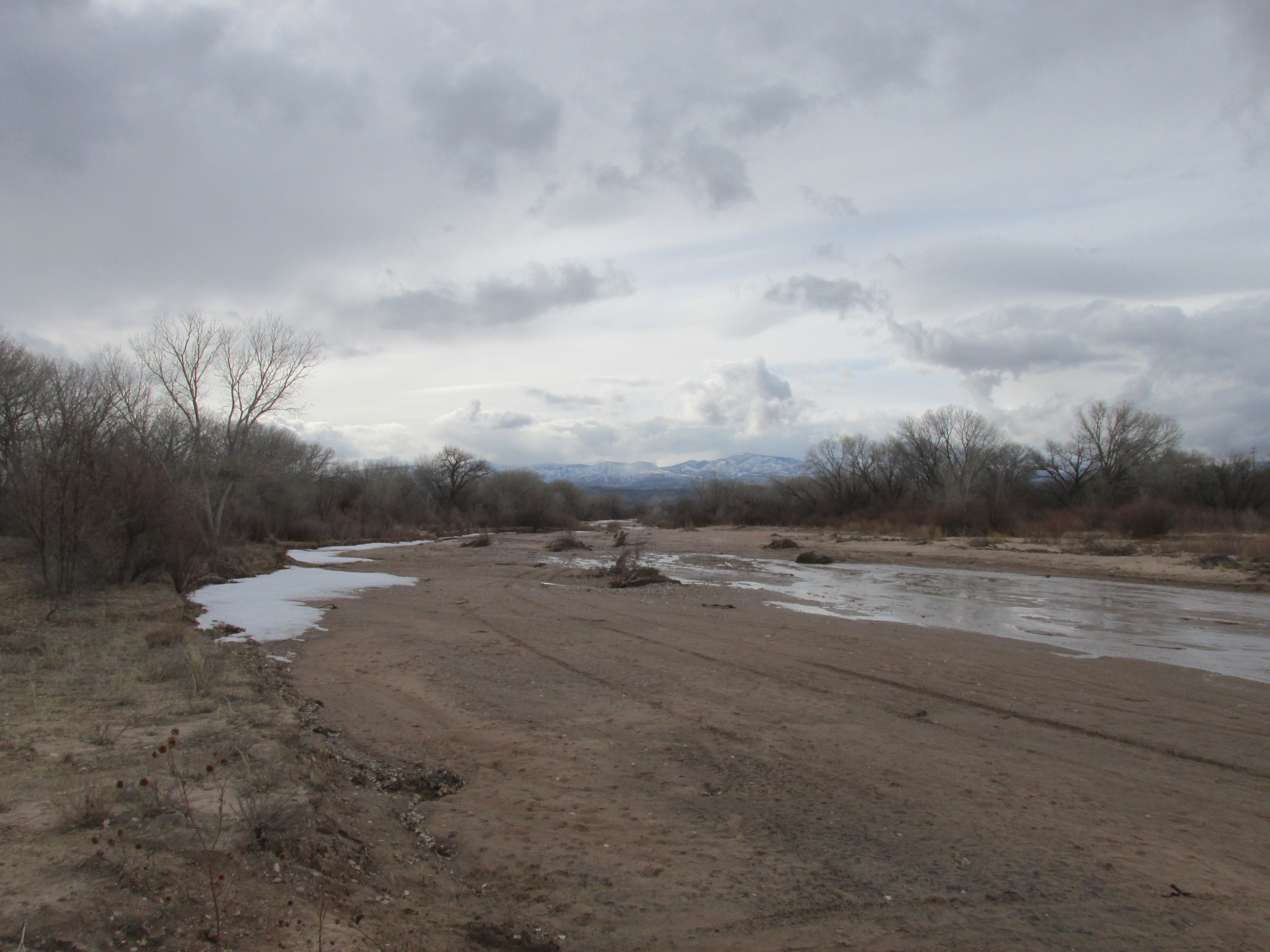
- Pojoaque River

- Location of Jaconita, New Mexico

- Location in the United States
- Coordinates: 35°53′08″N 106°03′40″W
- Country: United States
- State: New Mexico
- County: Santa Fe

Area
  - Total: 0.68 sq mi (1.75 km^{2})
  - Land: 0.68 sq mi (1.75 km^{2})
  - Water: 0 sq mi (0.00 km^{2})
- Elevation: 5,729 ft (1,746 m)

Population (2020)
  - Total: 289
  - Density: 428.9/sq mi (165.59/km^{2})
- Time zone: UTC-7 (Mountain (MST))
  - Summer (DST): UTC-6 (MDT)
- Area code: 505
- FIPS code: 35-34925
- GNIS feature ID: 2408435

Jaconita is a census-designated place (CDP) in Santa Fe County, New Mexico, United States. It is part of the Santa Fe, New Mexico Metropolitan Statistical Area. As of the 2020 census, Jaconita had a population of 289. It is considered to be a part of the Pojoaque Valley.

A ruined Tewa pueblo known as Sakǫną̈ˀe or Sakǫną̈kwą̈kųˀiˀe Ówîngeh Kayyee exists within the community.

== Geography ==
According to the United States Census Bureau, the CDP has a total area of 0.7 square miles (1.8 km^{2}), all land.

== Demographics ==
Historical population
Census	Pop.	Note	%±
2020	289		—
U.S. Decennial Census

As of the census of 2000, there were 343 people, 147 households, and 98 families residing in the CDP. The population density was 508.4 inhabitants per square mile (196.3/km^{2}). There were 170 housing units at an average density of 252.0 per square mile (97.3/km^{2}). The racial makeup of the CDP was 49.85% White, 0.29% African American, 0.58% Asian, 42.86% from other races, and 6.41% from two or more races. Hispanic or Latino of any race were 62.97% of the population.

There were 147 households, out of which 27.2% had children under the age of 18 living with them, 51.7% were married couples living together, 10.2% had a female householder with no husband present, and 32.7% were non-families. 26.5% of all households were made up of individuals, and 12.9% had someone living alone who was 65 years of age or older. The average household size was 2.33 and the average family size was 2.84.

In the CDP, the population was spread out, with 21.0% under the age of 18, 7.0% from 18 to 24, 29.7% from 25 to 44, 25.9% from 45 to 64, and 16.3% who were 65 years of age or older. The median age was 40 years. For every 100 females, there were 110.4 males. For every 100 females age 18 and over, there were 111.7 males.

The median income for a household in the CDP was $41,667, and the median income for a family was $61,875. Males had a median income of $37,727 versus $32,411 for females. The per capita income for the CDP was $22,888. About 4.4% of families and 8.5% of the population were below the poverty line, including none of those under age 18 and 43.1% of those age 65 or over.

== Education ==
It is zoned to Pojoaque Valley Schools. Pojoaque Valley High School is the zoned comprehensive high school.

== See also ==
- List of census-designated places in New Mexico
