= El Valle de Arroyo Seco, New Mexico =

- CDP
- Location of El Valle de Arroyo Seco, New Mexico.

- Location in the United States
- Coordinates: 35°57′10″N 106°01′33″W
- Country: United States
- State: New Mexico
- County: Santa Fe

Area
  - Total: 5.13 sq mi (13.29 km^{2})
  - Land: 5.13 sq mi (13.29 km^{2})
  - Water: 0 sq mi (0.00 km^{2})
- Elevation: 5,840 ft (1,780 m)

Population (2020)
  - Total: 1,431
  - Density: 278.9/sq mi (107.69/km^{2})
- Time zone: UTC-7 (Mountain (MST))
  - Summer (DST): UTC-6 (MDT)
- Area code: 505
- FIPS code: 35-24347
- GNIS feature ID: 2408063

El Valle de Arroyo Seco is a census-designated place (CDP) in Santa Fe County, New Mexico, United States. It is part of the Santa Fe, New Mexico Metropolitan Statistical Area. As of the 2020 census, El Valle de Arroyo Seco had a population of 1,431.

== Geography ==
According to the United States Census Bureau, the CDP has a total area of 5.2 square miles (13 km^{2}), all land.

== Demographics ==
Historical population
Census	Pop.	Note	%±
2020	1,431		—
U.S. Decennial Census

As of the census of 2000, there were 1,149 people, 407 households, and 304 families residing in the CDP. The population density was 221.4 inhabitants per square mile (85.5/km^{2}). There were 438 housing units at an average density of 84.4 per square mile (32.6/km^{2}). The racial makeup of the CDP was 60.57% White, 0.61% African American, 1.48% Native American, 0.35% Asian, 0.17% Pacific Islander, 31.77% from other races, and 5.05% from two or more races. Hispanic or Latino of any race were 69.97% of the population.

There were 407 households, out of which 40.8% had children under the age of 18 living with them, 52.8% were married couples living together, 15.2% had a female householder with no husband present, and 25.3% were non-families. 18.7% of all households were made up of individuals, and 3.7% had someone living alone who was 65 years of age or older. The average household size was 2.82 and the average family size was 3.19.

In the CDP, the population was spread out, with 30.1% under the age of 18, 9.7% from 18 to 24, 27.7% from 25 to 44, 24.5% from 45 to 64, and 8.0% who were 65 years of age or older. The median age was 34 years. For every 100 females, there were 100.5 males. For every 100 females age 18 and over, there were 103.8 males.

The median income for a household in the CDP was $33,056, and the median income for a family was $42,344. Males had a median income of $40,139 versus $27,596 for females. The per capita income for the CDP was $19,712. About 5.7% of families and 6.6% of the population were below the poverty line, including 10.7% of those under age 18 and 4.1% of those age 65 or over.

== Education ==
Almost all of the CDP is in Pojoaque Valley Public Schools, while a small section is in Española Public Schools. The comprehensive public high school for the Pojoaque Valley district is Pojoaque Valley High School, while the one for the Española district is Española Valley High School.
