= El Rancho, New Mexico =

El Rancho, New Mexico Khoso'o (Tewa)
- Census-designated place
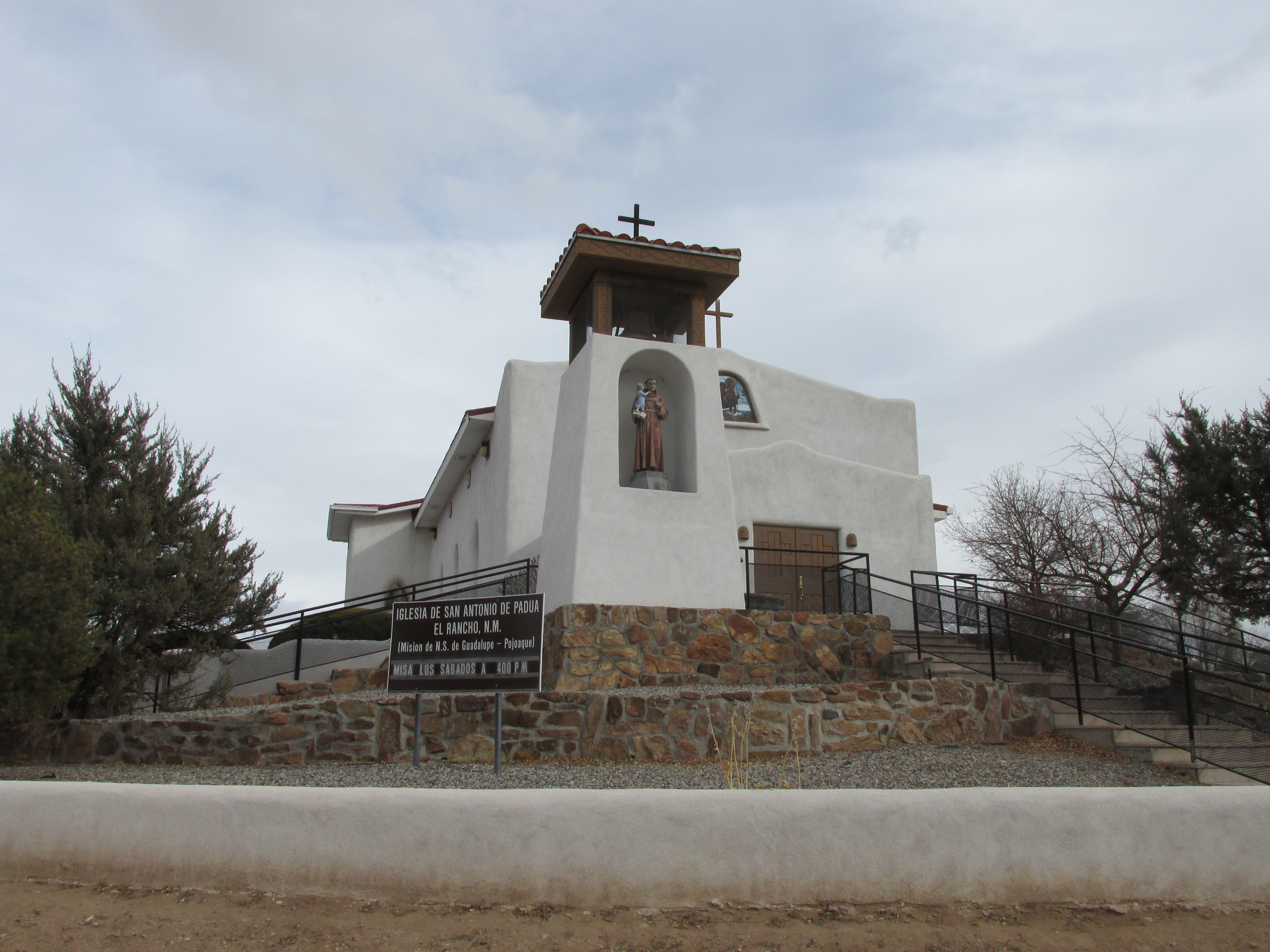
- Iglesia de San Antonio de Padua

- Location of El Rancho, New Mexico

- Location in the United States
- Coordinates: 35°53′34″N 106°05′08″W
- Country: United States
- State: New Mexico
- County: Santa Fe

Area
  - Total: 2.10 sq mi (5.44 km^{2})
  - Land: 2.10 sq mi (5.44 km^{2})
  - Water: 0 sq mi (0.00 km^{2})
- Elevation: 5,640 ft (1,720 m)

Population (2020)
  - Total: 1,120
  - Density: 533.6/sq mi (206.02/km^{2})
- Time zone: UTC-7 (Mountain (MST))
  - Summer (DST): UTC-6 (MDT)
- Area code: 505
- FIPS code: 35-23840
- GNIS feature ID: 2408059

El Rancho (Tewa: Khosoˀo) is a census-designated place (CDP) in Santa Fe County, New Mexico, United States. It is part of the Santa Fe, New Mexico Metropolitan Statistical Area. As of the 2020 census, El Rancho had a population of 1,120.

== Geography ==
According to the United States Census Bureau, the CDP has a total area of 2.1 square miles (5.4 km^{2}), all land.

== Demographics ==
Historical population
Census	Pop.	Note	%±
2020	1,120		—
U.S. Decennial Census

As of the census of 2000, there were 817 people, 310 households, and 221 families residing in the CDP. The population density was 355.6 inhabitants per square mile (137.3/km^{2}). There were 345 housing units at an average density of 150.2 per square mile (58.0/km^{2}). The racial makeup of the CDP was 82.62% White, 1.47% Native American, 0.12% Pacific Islander, 10.53% from other races, and 5.26% from two or more races. Hispanic or Latino of any race were 70.26% of the population.

There were 310 households, out of which 39.4% had children under the age of 18 living with them, 56.1% were married couples living together, 10.6% had a female householder with no husband present, and 28.4% were non-families. 24.5% of all households were made up of individuals, and 5.2% had someone living alone who was 65 years of age or older. The average household size was 2.64 and the average family size was 3.16.

In the CDP, the population was spread out, with 27.8% under the age of 18, 7.3% from 18 to 24, 28.0% from 25 to 44, 25.6% from 45 to 64, and 11.3% who were 65 years of age or older. The median age was 37 years. For every 100 females, there were 92.7 males. For every 100 females age 18 and over, there were 89.7 males.

The median income for a household in the CDP was $31,450, and the median income for a family was $33,958. Males had a median income of $32,500 versus $23,864 for females. The per capita income for the CDP was $17,353. About 5.4% of families and 7.4% of the population were below the poverty line, including 8.1% of those under age 18 and 3.1% of those age 65 or over.

== Education ==
It is zoned to Pojoaque Valley Schools. Pojoaque Valley High School is the zoned comprehensive high school.

== See also ==
- List of census-designated places in New Mexico
