= Pojoaque Valley High School =

Location
- 1574 State Road 502 West; Santa Fe County, New Mexico 87506; United States

Information
- Type: Public high school
- Principal: Ryan Cordova
- Teaching staff: 32.70 (FTE)
- Enrollment: 636 (2022-23)
- Student to teacher ratio: 19.45
- Campus: Rural, 35 acres
- Colors: Kelly green and white
- Athletics conference: NMAA, District 2-AAAA
- Mascot: Elks
- Rival: Espanola High School
- Website: www.pvs.k12.nm.us/o/hs

Pojoaque Valley High School is a public high school in unincorporated Santa Fe County, New Mexico. It is located on the Jacona Campus, which is outside of the Jacona census-designated place. It serves the Pojoaque Valley in New Mexico and its colors are kelly green and white. Their mascot is the Elk.

== Service area ==
Pojoaque Valley High School serves Cundiyo, Cuyamungue, Cuyamungue Grant, El Rancho, Jacona, Jaconita, Nambe, Pojoaque, San Ildefonso Pueblo, Tesuque Pueblo, most of El Valle de Arroyo Seco, most of Peak Place, a portion of La Tierra, and a portion of Tano Road.

== Athletics ==
Pojoaque Valley High School is a NMAA District 2-AAAA school along with Espanola Valley High School, Los Alamos High School, Moriarty High School and Taos High School.

PVHS competes in 12 NMAA sport and activity events and has won 21 state championships in 3A.

3A NMAA state championships
Season	Sport	Number of championships	Year
Fall	Cross country, boys'	5	2000, 2002, 2003, 2011, 2012
Fall	Cross country, girls'	3	1998, 2000, 2002
Fall	Volleyball Soccer, boys'	6 1	2006, 2009, 2010, 2011, 2012, 2013 1989
Winter	Basketball, boys'	1	2008
Winter	Basketball, girls'	3	1998, 2008, 2009
Spring	Baseball	2	1984, 2005
Spring	Track & field, girls'	1	2009
Total		21	

== Notable alumni ==
- Javier Gonzales, 42nd mayor of Santa Fe
- Kenneth J. Gonzales, chief United States district judge of the United States District Court for the District of New Mexico
- Ben Lujan, speaker of the New Mexico House of Representatives from 2001 to 2012
- Ben Ray Luján, U.S. senator, former congressman from New Mexico's 3rd congressional district; former member of the New Mexico Public Regulation Commission
- Brenda McKenna, member of the New Mexico Senate
- Carl Trujillo, member of the New Mexico House of Representatives
- Jim Trujillo, member of the New Mexico House of Representatives
