= Tesuque Pueblo, New Mexico =

Tesuque Pueblo, New Mexico Teˀtsʼúgéh Ówîngeh (Tewa)
- CDP
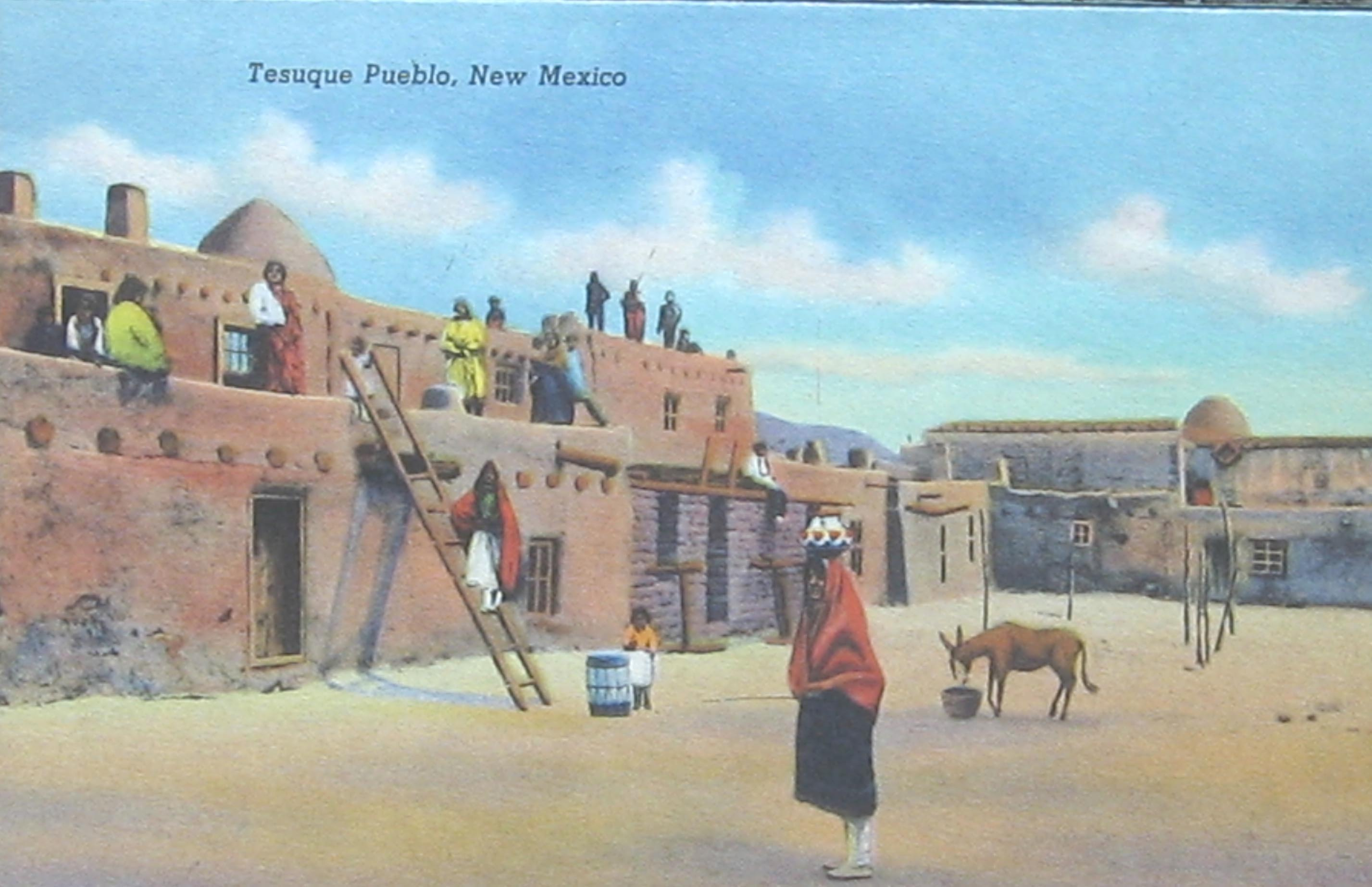
- Postcard of Tesuque Pueblo

- Location within Santa Fe County, New Mexico

- Location within the United States
- Coordinates: 35°48′33″N 105°58′31″W
- Country: United States
- State: New Mexico
- County: Santa Fe

Area
  - Total: 2.20 sq mi (5.69 km^{2})
  - Land: 2.20 sq mi (5.69 km^{2})
  - Water: 0 sq mi (0.00 km^{2})
- Elevation: 6,359 ft (1,938 m)

Population (2020)
  - Total: 301
  - Density: 136.9/sq mi (52.87/km^{2})
- Time zone: UTC-7 (Mountain (MST))
  - Summer (DST): UTC-6 (MDT)
- Area code: 505
- GNIS feature ID: 2584224
- Pueblo of Tesuque
- U.S. National Register of Historic Places
- U.S. Historic district
- NM State Register of Cultural Properties
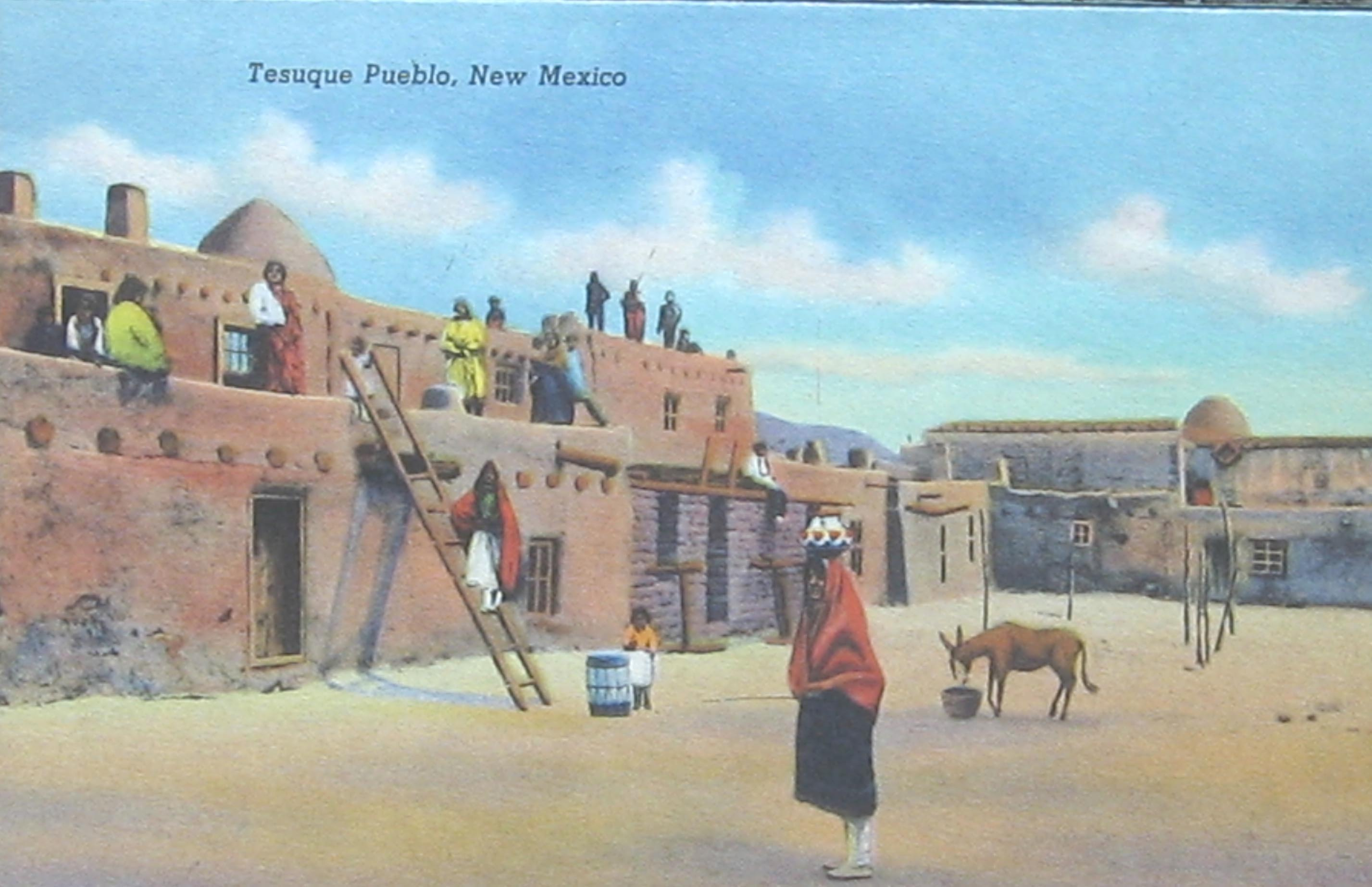
- Tesuque Pueblo

- Location within New Mexico Location within the United States
- Nearest city: Santa Fe, New Mexico
- Area: 12.6 acres (5.1 ha)
- Built: 1694
- NRHP reference No.: 73001149
- NMSRCP No.: 222

Significant dates
- Added to NRHP: July 16, 1973
- Designated NMSRCP: November 22, 1971

Tesuque Pueblo (Note: /təˈsuːki/ tə-SOO-kee) (Tewa: Teˀtsʼúgéh Ówîngeh, pronounced [tèʔts’úɡé ʔówîŋɡè], transl. 'cottonwood trees in a narrow place village' – transl. 'structure at a narrow place village') is an unincorporated community and census-designated place in Santa Fe County, New Mexico, United States. As of the 2020 census, Tesuque Pueblo had a population of 301. The Pueblo is a member of the Tewa ethnic group of Native Americans who speak the Tewa language. The pueblo was listed as a historic district on the National Register of Historic Places in 1973.

== Geography ==
According to the U.S. Census Bureau, the community has an area of 2.198 square miles (5.69 km^{2}), all land. Camel Rock is a distinctive rock formation along U.S. Routes 84/285 across from the Camel Rock Studios owned by Tesuque Pueblo.

== Demographics ==
Historical population
Census	Pop.	Note	%±
2020	301		—
U.S. Decennial Census

== Government ==
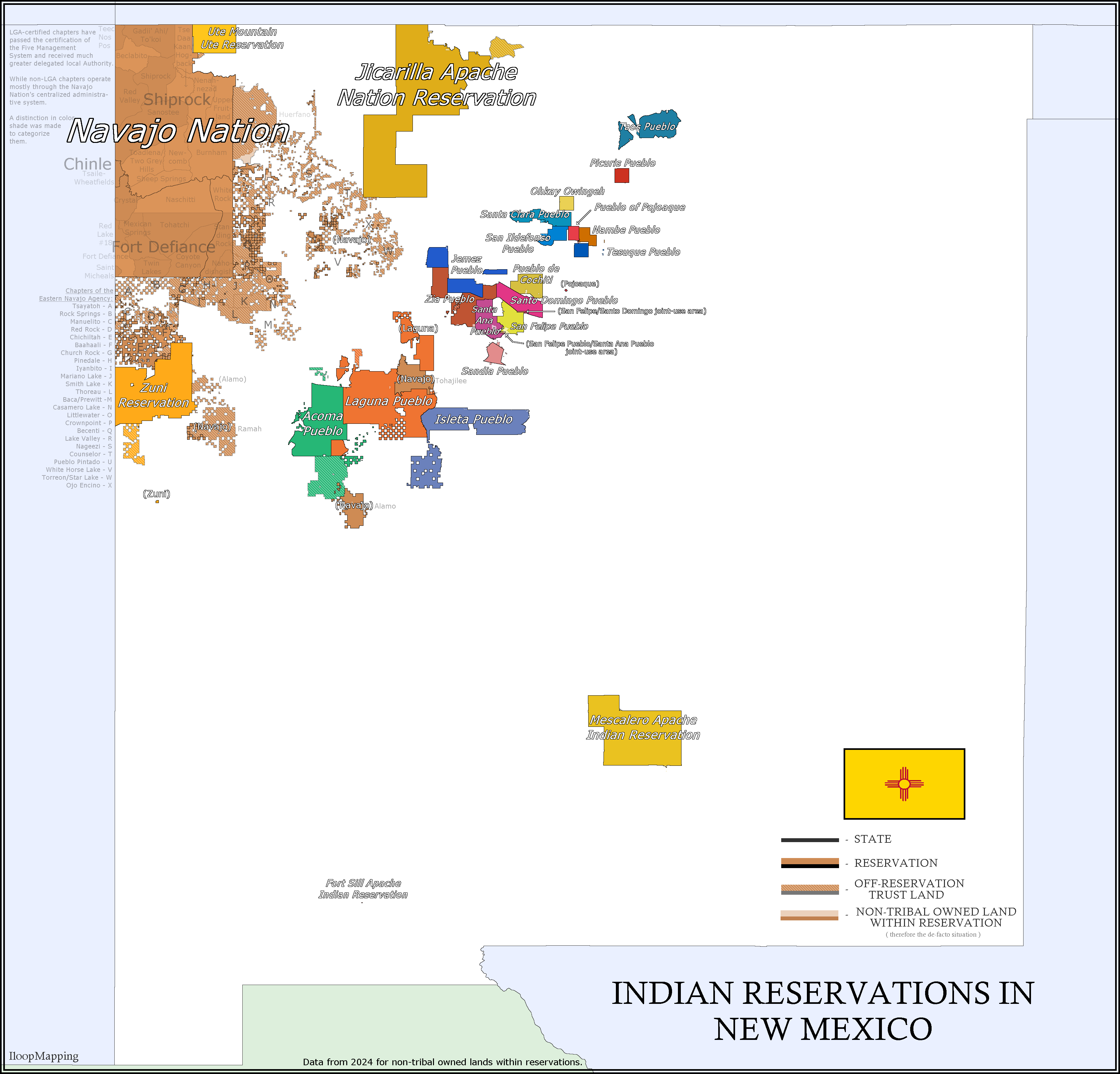
Map of the Tesuque and neighbouring tribes (In blue).

The administration of the Pueblo of Tesuque in 2025 is:

- Governor: Earl Samuel
- Lieutenant Governor: Daniel Hena

== Education ==
Te Tsu Geh Oweenge Day School a.k.a. Tesuque Day School is a Bureau of Indian Education (BIE)-affiliated tribal school. It is located in Tesuque Pueblo.

In regards to conventional school district-operated public schools, Tesuque Pueblo is zoned to Pojoaque Valley Schools. Pojoaque Valley High School is the zoned comprehensive high school.

Some Tesuque Pueblo students who were alumni of the BIA school, as of 1987, moved on to the public district-operated middle school, while others moved on to Santa Fe Indian School, a BIA/BIE-operated secondary school.

== See also ==
- National Register of Historic Places listings in Santa Fe County, New Mexico
