= Nambé Pueblo, New Mexico =

- Pueblo of Nambé; Nąnbeˀ Ówîngeh (Tewa)
- U.S. National Register of Historic Places
- U.S. Historic district
- NM State Register of Cultural Properties
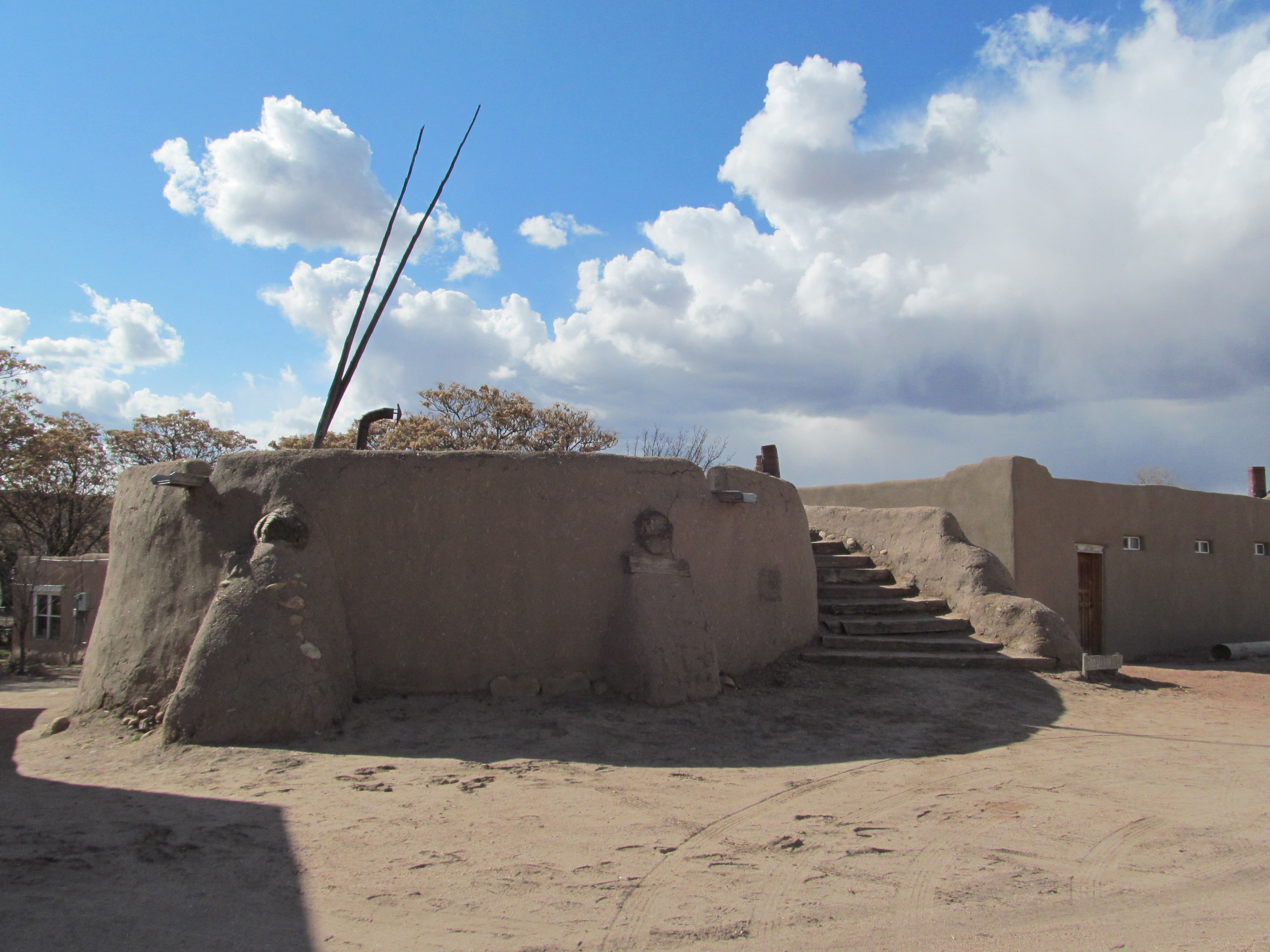
- The Kiva

- Location within New Mexico Location within the United States
- Nearest city: Santa Fe, New Mexico
- Coordinates: 35°53′5″N 105°57′52″W
- Area: 7.7 acres (3.1 ha)
- Built: 1540
- NRHP reference No.: 74001208
- NMSRCP No.: 241

Significant dates
- Added to NRHP: January 21, 1974
- Designated NMSRCP: March 13, 1972

Nambé Pueblo (Note: /nɑːmˈbeɪ/, nahm-BAY) (Tewa: Nąnbeˀ Ówîngeh, (Note: also spelled Nambé O-ween-gé) pronounced [nɑ̃̀mbèʔ ʔówîŋɡè]) is a federally recognized tribe of the Tewa Pueblo people in Santa Fe County, New Mexico. For statistical purposes, the United States Census Bureau has defined the community as a census-designated place (CDP).

The Pueblo of Nambé has existed since the 14th century and is a member of the Eight Northern Pueblos. It was a primary cultural, economic, and religious center at the time of the arrival of Spanish colonists in the very early 17th century. Nambé was one of the Pueblos that organized and participated in the Pueblo Revolt of 1680 which expelled the Spanish from New Mexico for twelve years.

The community of Nambe, New Mexico, is separate from the pueblo.

== Government ==
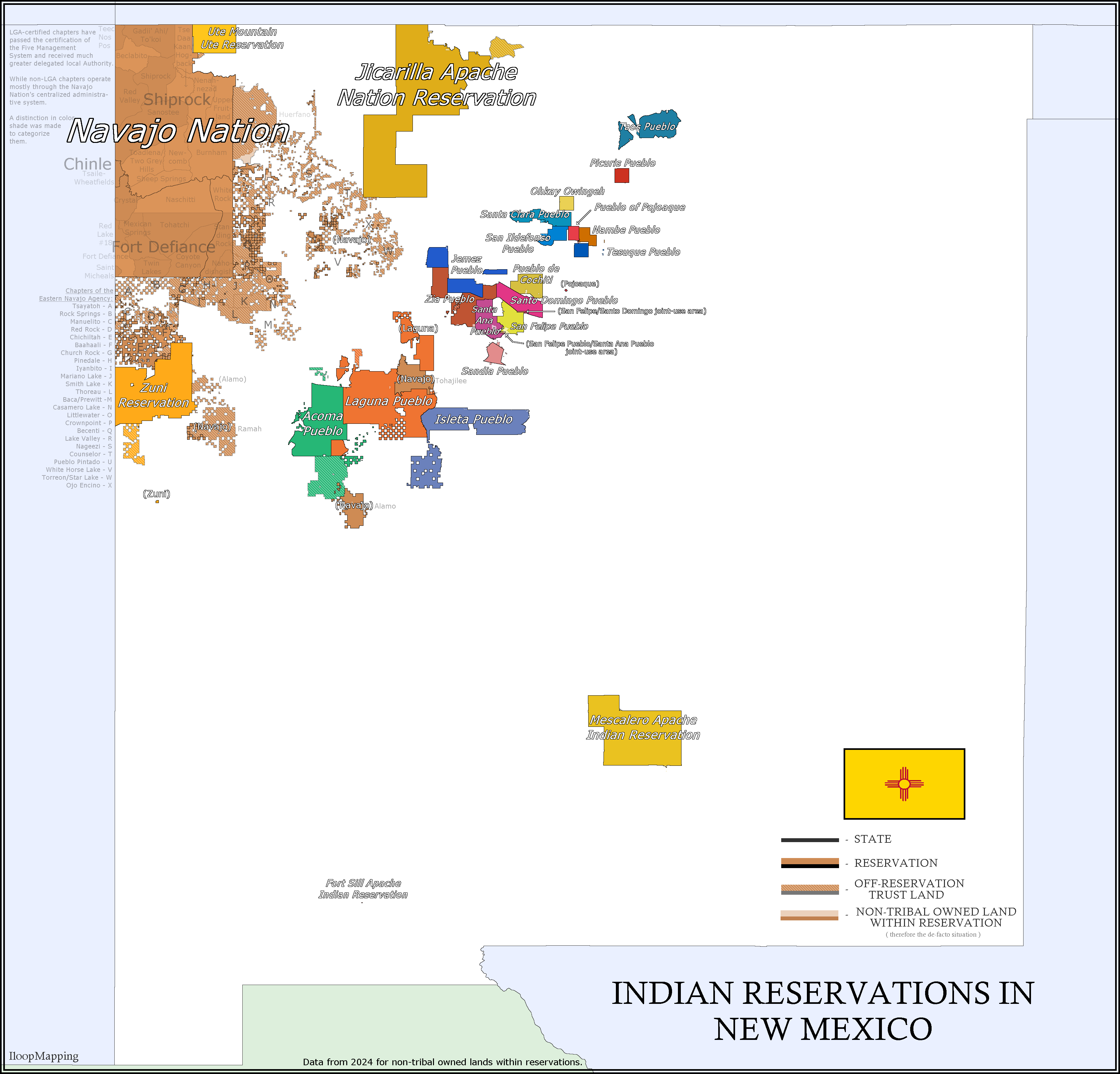
Map of the Nambé and neighbouring tribes (In dark orange).

The administration of the Pueblo of Nambé in 2025 is:

- Governor: Nathaniel S. Porter
- Lieutenant Governor: Natividad Herrera

== Name ==
Nambé is the Spanish version of a similar-sounding Tewa word, which can be interpreted loosely as meaning "rounded earth." The word pueblo stems from the Spanish word for "village." Pueblo refers to the physical settlement, to the Southwestern style architecture, and the people themselves.

== Demographics ==
The 2010 census found that 1,818 people lived in the CDP, while 568 people in the United States reported being exclusively Nambé and 723 people reported being Nambé exclusively or in combination with another group.

== Language ==
The Nambé language is a dialect of the Tewa language, also called Tano, which belongs to the Kiowa-Tanoan language family.

== History ==
=== Origin and early history ===
Scholars believe that all Pueblo peoples are descended from the Ancestral Pueblo people, possibly from the Mogollón, and other ancient peoples. In contemporary times, the people and their archaeological culture were referred to as Anasazi for historical purposes - a Navajo term loosely translated as "Enemy Ancestors" as some Navajo clans are descendants of the Anasazi. Contemporary Puebloans do not want this term to be used. As the Ancestral Puebloans abandoned their canyon homeland due to social upheaval and climate change, they migrated to other areas. Eventually the Nambé emerged as a culture in their new homeland in present-day New Mexico.

=== European contact ===
The Spanish conquistador Juan de Oñate arrived with armed forces in the area in 1598. He forced Nambé Pueblo, as was the case with other pueblos, to start paying him taxes with cotton, crops and labor. Catholic missionaries also came into the area, threatening native religious beliefs. They renamed pueblos with saints' names, and the first church, San Francisco de Nambé, was built in Nambé Pueblo in the early 1600s. The Spanish introduced new foods to the native communities, including peaches, peppers, and wheat. In 1620 a royal decree assigned civil offices to each Pueblo.

== Economy ==
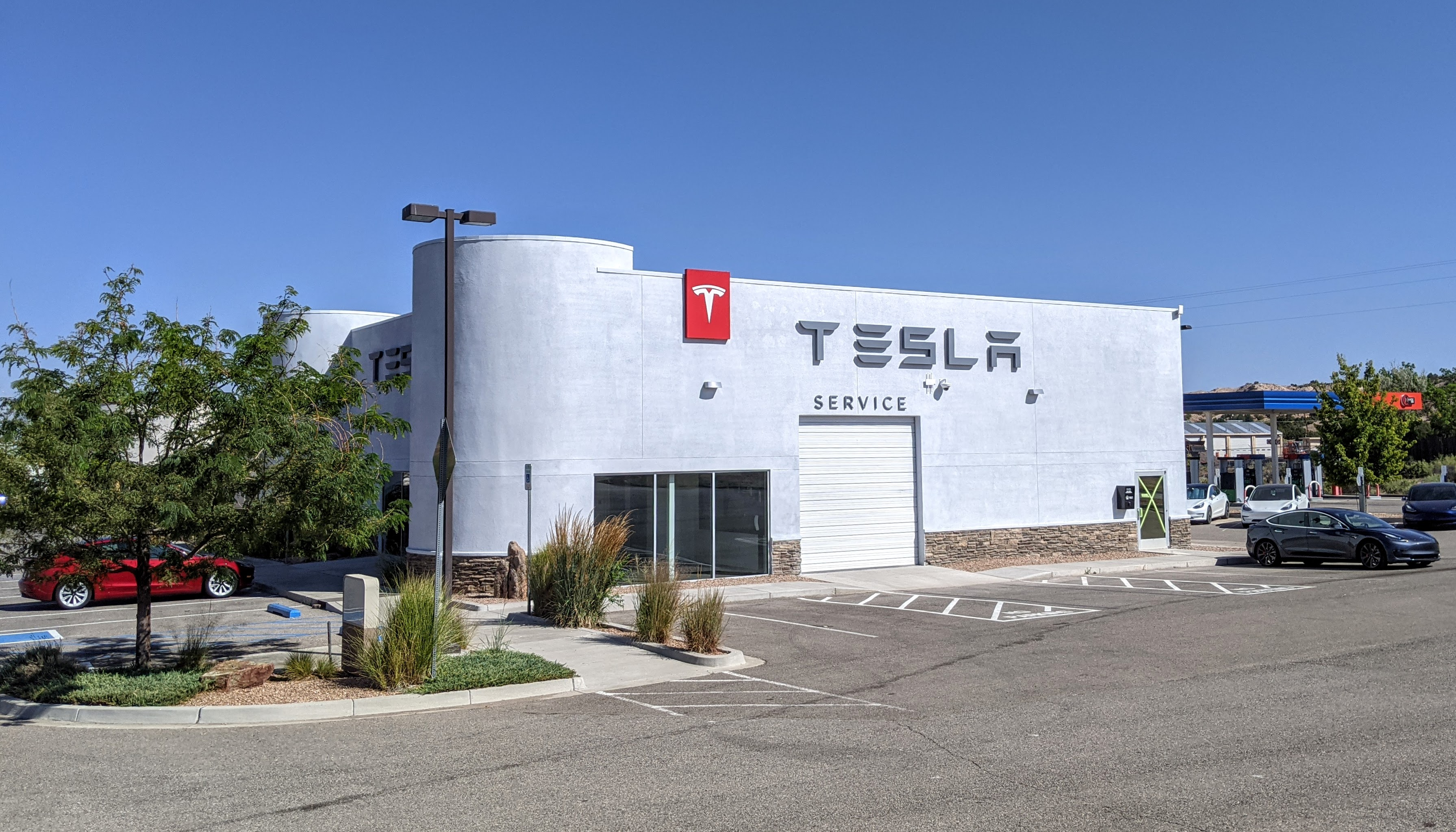
Tesla New Mexico at Nambé Pueblo

The people of Nambé Pueblo participate in a mixed economy, with many travelling to jobs outside of the Pueblo lands.

Prior to 2020, the Nambé operated a casino on tribal land at the Nambé Falls Travel Center. In 2021, Tesla opened a 7,000 sq ft (650 m^{2}) service center on Nambé land to service Tesla vehicles, after signing an agreement with Nambé Pueblo leaders. This allowed the first service center to open in the State of New Mexico since state law prohibits automakers from selling direct to consumers, as Tesla does, and state law did not allow Tesla to open a service center without selling cars through intermediary car dealers. By November 2022, Tesla had followed this model of leasing Native American land for a service and delivery center at a second New Mexico city—Santa Ana—which is 60 mi (97 km) closer to the large city of Albuquerque. The store opened in June 2023 and is five times larger than the facility in Nambe.

== Education ==
The Nambé Pueblo is zoned into Pojoaque Valley Schools. Pojoaque Valley High School is the zoned comprehensive high school.

== Notable people ==
- Marilyn Bendell, impressionist painter
- Brenda McKenna, member of the New Mexico Senate, 2021
- Margaret Lefranc, painter, illustrator, and editor
- Ben Luján, member and former speaker of the New Mexico House of Representatives
- Ben Ray Luján, former member of U.S. House of Representatives, United States Senator from New Mexico (2021), son of Ben Luján
- Nathaniel A. Owings, architect
- Lonnie Vigil, pottery artist

== See also ==
- National Register of Historic Places listings in Santa Fe County, New Mexico
