= Tewa language =

Tanoan language spoken in NM and AZ

Tewa
- Native to: United States
- Region: New Mexico, Arizona
- Ethnicity: Tewa people
- Native speakers: 1,600 (2007)
- Language family: Tanoan: Tewa

Language codes
- ISO 639-3: tew
- Glottolog: tewa1261
- ELP: Tewa
- Linguasphere: 64-CAB-a
- Tewa is classified as Definitely Endangered by the UNESCO Atlas of the World's Languages in Danger.

Tewa (/ˈteɪwə/ TAY-wə) is a Tanoan language spoken by the Tewa Puebloan nations in the Rio Grande valley in New Mexico north of Santa Fe, and in Arizona. It is also known as Tano, or Tée-wah (archaic). There is some disagreement among the Tewa people about whether or not Tewa should have a written form, as some Pueblo elders believe that their language should be preserved by oral tradition alone. Because of this, it was not until the 1960s that the language was written down for the first time. However, many Tewa speakers have decided that Tewa literacy is an important aspect in passing down the language and so orthographies have been created for this purpose.

The language has struggled to maintain a healthy speaker base; however, because of efforts to preserve the language starting in the 1980s—both by native speakers and linguists—this problem is not as dire as for some other indigenous languages.

Tewa has a fairly large phoneme inventory with 45 distinct individual sounds. Twelve of these are vowels, which can be either long or short. Tewa, like other Tanoan languages, also makes use of tones, of which it has four.

== History ==
Tewa is a member of the Kiowa-Tanoan language family. Within Kiowa-Tanoan, it is often considered to form a clade with Tiwa, but the lack of shared innovations between the two suggests that their divergence was relatively rapid, perhaps due to the migration of one or both groups. Following the arrival of the Tewa in the Rio Grande Valley, contact between Ohkay Owingeh and Northern Tiwa speakers resulted in some shared innovations between Northern Tiwa and "northern" Tewa, which are absent in the Santa Clara dialect.

The 1980 census counted 1,298 Tewa speakers, almost all of whom were bilingual in English. At Santa Clara Pueblo, there were 207 speakers.

Today, the Endangered Languages Project estimates a total of 1,500 speakers worldwide, with 1,200 of them in the New Mexico pueblos and 300 in the Arizona village of Hano. Of these speakers, few are fluent with the vast majority being semi-speakers, and only in a few places, namely Hano, are children acquiring Tewa. At the largest New Mexico pueblo, Ohkay Owingeh (San Juan), there are only 30 fluent speakers left as of 2008.

As of 2012, Tewa is defined as "severely endangered" in New Mexico by UNESCO.

== Varieties ==
The Santa Clara dialect has a number of differences with the other pueblos. Santa Clara dialect uses /dʒ/ in words where only /j/ is heard in other pueblos, although some Santa Clara speakers use /j/ and /dʒ/ sporadically. Santa Clara also uses /f/, /θ/, and /x/ where other dialects tend towards /pʰ/, /tʰ/, and /kʰ/. In two-syllable word bases, words that have a short /u/ in the initial syllable have a long /u/ in the Santa Clara dialect. In the Santa Clara dialect, where other pueblos have a high tone on this syllable, there will instead be a glide tone. These divergences, along with evidence from archaeological and oral history, led Ortman to suggest the Santa Clara dialect originates with Tano Tewa from the Galisteo Basin.

Another important dialectical difference aligns Santa Clara, Tesuque, and San Ildefonso Tewa against Ohkay (San Juan) and Nambé Tewa. The former use /d/ in the same environments where the latter use a nasal plus /d/.

== Phonology ==
The phonemes of Rio Grande Tewa are as follows:

=== Consonants ===
| | | Labial | Dental/ Alveolar | | Palatal | Velar | | Glottal |
| | | Labial | plain | sibilant | Palatal | plain | lab. | Glottal |
|---|---|---|---|---|---|---|---|---|
| Plosive/ Affricate | voiceless | p | t | ts | tʃ | k | kʷ | ʔ |
| Plosive/ Affricate | ejective | pʼ | tʼ | tsʼ | tʃʼ | kʼ | kʷʼ | |
| Plosive/ Affricate | voiced | b | d | | dʒ (Note: Occurs only in the Santa Clara dialect where other dialects have /j/.) | ɡ | | |
| Fricative | voiceless | f | θ | s | ʃ | x | xʷ | h |
| Fricative | voiced | v | | | | | | |
| Nasal | | m | n | | (ɲ) (Note: Occurs in some speakers as an allophone of /j/ when succeeded by a nasal vowel.) | (ŋ) (Note: Allophone of /n/ word-finally or when followed by a velar or glottal consonant, /w/, or an external transition.) | | |
| Flap | | | ɾ | | | | | |
| Approximant | | | | | j | | w | |

- All alveolars shown are apico-alveolar.
- /t/ is apico-dental [t̺̪].
- /g/ and /k/ are dorso-prevelar [k̟, ɡ̟] before front vowels and dorso-velar [k, ɡ] before back vowels. Spirantization can also occur, causing /ɡ/ to be pronounced like [ɣ] or [ʁ].
- /f/ ranges from [f] to [ɸ] to [pʰ].
- /θ/ ranges from apico-dental [θ] to [t̪ʰ].
- /v/ ranges from [v] to [β].
- /x/ ranges from [x] to [kʰ].
- /xʷ/ ranges from [xʷ] to [kʷʰ].

=== Vowels ===
| | Front | | Back | |
| | oral | nasal | oral | nasal |
|---|---|---|---|---|
| Close | i iː | ĩ ĩː | u uː | ũ ũː |
| Close-mid (Note: Front vowels range between [e] and [ɛ], and back vowels between [o] and [ɔ].) | e eː | ẽ ẽː | o oː | õ õː |
| Open (Note: Front vowels range between [æ] and [ɛ], and back vowels from [ɒ] to [a].) | æ æː | æ̃ æ̃ː | ɑ ɑː | ɑ̃ ɑ̃ː |

- Vowels are distinguished both by length and nasality.
- In syllables closed by nasal consonants or in final weak stressed syllables, /i/ occurs as [ɪˆ].
- /e/ is [e] when long, but is [eˇ] when short and [əˆ] when closed by a nasal consonant.
- /æ/, when following /m/ is realized a bit raised, and when following /n/ is realized as [əˆ].
- /u/ is realized as [ʊˆ] in syllables closed by a nasal vowel.
- /ãː/ is realized as [ɐ] by some speakers.

=== Syllable structure ===
There are 9 types of syllables in Tewa: CV, CV:, CVN, CVh, CVʔ, CV', CVʔN, V, and VN.

N here stands for nasal, and as seen, there are some constructions where the only consonants available are :, h, or nasals, and as such these have been specified in order to create maximum specificity, instead of just referring to these constructions with just the C for consonant.

=== Tone ===
Tewa has three tones, high, low, and glide.

Within two-syllable words, the only combinations found are high-high, low-low, low-high, and high-low.

=== Stress ===
The use of stress in Tewa is still relatively unknown.

In two-syllable nouns with the pattern CVCV and the tone pattern high-high or low-low, there is heavier stress placed on the first syllable. Roots also tend to show heavier stress than affixes if each is the same syllable and tone type. A stronger stress is associated with a higher tone and greater vowel length. However, because of the complex use of tone, syllable type, and contour segments more research does need to be done.

== Orthography ==
Tewa can be written with the Latin script. Writing has developed independently across the pueblos to meet the needs of the dialects spoken therein, so a variety of conventions are deployed to write Tewa rather than a single orthography.

The table below shows three orthographies used to write Tewa:

| IPA | | Orthography | | |
| IPA | | Martinez (1982) | Wycliffe USA (2012) | Ashworth (2013) |
Consonants
| /ʔ/ | word-initially | ∅ | | |
| /ʔ/ | elsewhere | ˀ | | ʼ |
| /b/ | | b | | |
| /d/ | | d | | |
| /r/ | | ḏ | | |
| /ɡ/ | | g | | |
| /h/ | | h | | |
| /k/ | | k | | |
| /m/ | | m | | |
| /n/ | | n | | |
| /p/ | | p | | |
| /s/ | | s | | |
| /t/ | | t | | |
| /v/ | | v | | |
| /w/ | | w | | |
| /j/, /dʒ/ | | y | y, j | y |
| /tʃ/ | | ch | | |
| /x/ | | kh | | |
| /f/ | | ph | | f |
| /ʃ/ | | sh | | |
| /θ/ | | th | | |
| /xʷ/ | | wh | | |
| /ts/ | | ts | | |
| /kʷ/ | | kw | | |
| /pʼ/ | | pʼ | pꞌ (Note: Aspirated consonants are rendered with a Saltillo in digital text.) | pʼ |
| /tʼ/ | | tʼ | tꞌ | tʼ |
| /kʼ/ | | kʼ | kꞌ | kʼ |
| /tʃʼ/ | | chʼ | chꞌ | chʼ |
| /tsʼ/ | | tsʼ | tsꞌ | tsʼ |
| /kʷʼ/ | | kwʼ | kwꞌ | kwʼ |
Vowels
| /ɑ/ | | a | | |
| /e/ | word-finally | eh | e | eh |
| /e/ | elsewhere | e | | |
| /i/ | | i | | |
| /o/ | | o | | |
| /u/ | | u | | |
| /æ/ | | ä | | æ |
| /ɑː/ | | aa | | |
| /eː/ | | ay | | |
| /iː/ | | ee | | |
| /oː/ | | oe | | |
| /uː/ | | uu | | |
| /æː/ | | ää | | ææ |
| /Ṽ/ | | V̧ | V̖ | V̨ |
| /Ṽː/ | | V̧V̧ | V̖V̖ | V̨V̨ |
Tones
| /V̀/ | | V | | |
| /V́/ | | V́ | | |
| /V̂/ | | V̂ | | |
| /V̀ː/ | | VV | | |
| /V́ː/ | | V́V | | |
| /V̂ː/ | | V̂V | | |

Written Tewa is also occasionally used for such purposes as signs (Be-pu-wa-ve 'Welcome', or sen-ge-de-ho 'Bye').

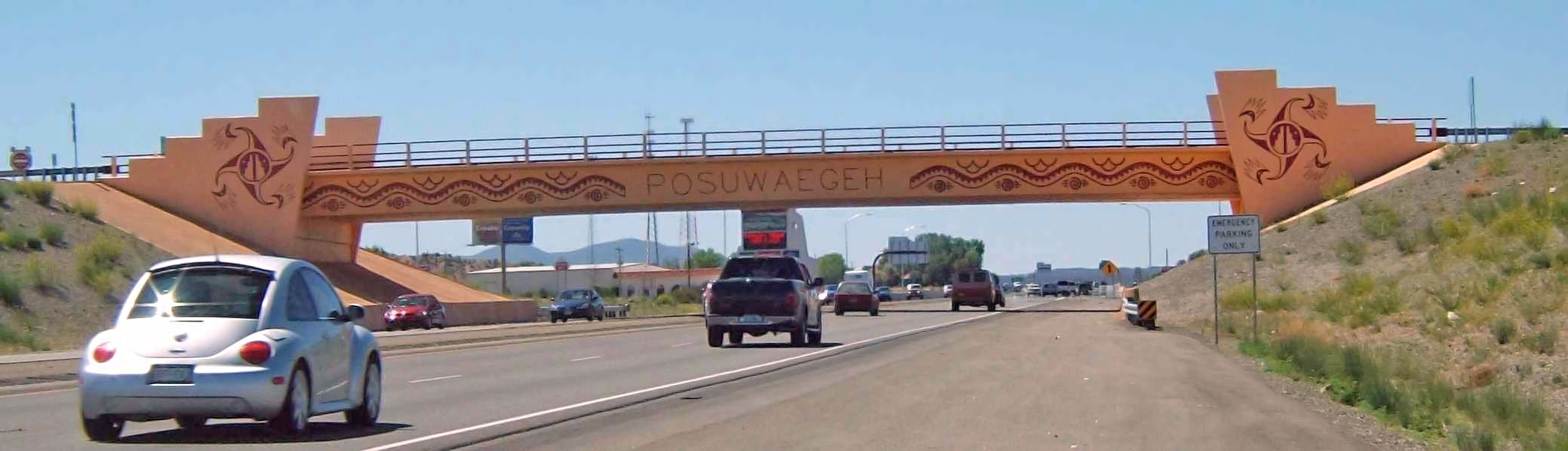
Overpass southeast of Pojoaque on Highway 84 renders the Tewa name of the pueblo as "Posuwaegeh"

== Morphology ==
=== Roots ===
Tewa has what are called both "free" and "bound" roots.

Free roots are defined as those roots which can be converted directly into a word, sometimes be the addition of a word superfix. Within free roots, there are two additional types, isolated and non-isolated free roots. There is a very small number of isolated free roots, as these are roots that are neither combinable with other roots nor affixable. Non-isolated free roots are roots that are combinable with other roots and/or are affixable. A limited non-isolated free root is one which can combine only with affixes, but not with other roots. A universal non-isolated free root is one which can combine both with other roots and affixes.

Bound roots are defined as those roots which cannot be converted directly into a word.

=== Verbs ===
Tewa has 15 types of verbs, and a few example verbs and their conjugations are shown below.

| Meaning | Habitual | Progressive | Completive | Potential | Imperative | Combining | Stative |
|---|---|---|---|---|---|---|---|
| divide | wiyende' | wiyende' | wiye | wiyé | wíyé | wiye | wiʔyen |
| enter | cʔuyaʔ | curemaen | cʔú | cʔún | cuwave | cure | |
| get (pl. obj.) | hónde' | hónde' | hógi | hón | hó'gí | xon | xo'gin |
| stir | wí:re' | wí:re' | wí: | wí: | wí: | wí: | wíʔin |
| return | bunde' | bummá: | bun | bu:n | bun | bun | buʔun |
| bite | xunde' | xunde' | xu:gi: | xu:n | xú'gí | xu:gi: | xu'gin |

Verbs can be divided into two classes, S and A, standing for stative and active, based on the pronominal prefixes which they contain. In general, S verbs deal with identity, quality, feeling, condition, position, and motion. Class A verbs are, in general, transitive verbs.

==== Verb affixes ====
All known verb affixes are included in the chart below, showing where the affixes fall in particular constructions of words.

| 6 | 5 | 4 | 3 | 2 | 1 | Root | 1 | 2 | 3 | 4 | 5 | 6 | 7 | 8 |
|---|---|---|---|---|---|---|---|---|---|---|---|---|---|---|
| ti | wí | VP | pi | ra | wé: | | ri: | í | pí | ri | raʔ | ân | kun | ho' |
| | | | | | | | ri' | | | an | á | á | waen | bo |
| | | | | | | | | | | waen | bo | há' | | an |
| | | | | | | | | | | | | | | há' |

These affixes are used to delineate tense, subject, negation, and emphasis.

=== Nouns ===
Nouns are divided into two classes: class N, which is affixed with set marker /-n/, and class non-N, which does not have this affix.

Class non-N is the larger of the two, containing almost all nouns in Tewa, which are, for the most part, mono- or di-syllabic.

Class N nouns are mostly designations for age-sex differentiation, kinship terms, and forms which translate as pronouns.

==== Noun affixes ====
All known noun affixes are included in the chart below.

| | Root | 1 | 2 | 3 | 4 | 5 | 6 | 7 | 8 | 9 | 10 | 11 |
|---|---|---|---|---|---|---|---|---|---|---|---|---|
| ti | | ge | n | gí' | á | rí | bá | bo | raʔ | ân | kun | ho' |
| | | | n2 | ví | á2 | | waen | há' | á | á | | ví |
| | | | | waen | | | | | | | | há' |

/-n2/ is different from /-n/ because of the occurrence of /-n2/ with singular, dual, and plural situations involving the same root, which is never the case for /-n/.

=== Class Z words ===
Class Z words are neither particles, verbs, or nouns. They are affixable with suffixes like /-á/, /-ân/, /-bo/, and /-ho'/, /-reʔ/, /-an/, /-we/, and /-ge/, but unlike nouns and verbs they do not occur with the specific affixes which delineate those classes (/wé:-/ or /pi-/ and /-ví/ respectively).

These compromise words whose English equivalents involve time, location, manner, interrogation, etc.

=== Morphological processes ===
- Substitution:
  - /d/ becomes /r/, /d/ being the initial occurrence and following /n/.
  - /b/ becomes /v/ in similar vowels to the /d/ ~ /r/ substitution.
  - /n/ becomes /m/, with the latter occurring before labials and the former elsewhere.
- Augmentation: Some suffixes occur with a longer form following /n/.
- Contraction: Certain suffixes occur preceding /-á/ series marker, /-á/ emphasizer, /-ân/ emphasizer, and /-an/ question marker.

== Syntax ==
=== Word order ===
Tewa sentences follow subject-object-verb order, however there are simple sentences in Tewa such as "handiriho gi-c'u" (that's how we got in) which are simply a subject and a predicate.

There are also many ways to say what would be translated as the same thing in English in Tewa. For example, there are three ways to say the sentence "The man and the woman are entering":

sen-ná-dí kwiyó da-cu:de-ʔeʔe
man-EMPH-ASSOC woman 3:DU:STAT-enter:come

sen-ná-dí kwiyo-wá-dí da-cu:de-ʔeʔe
man-EMPH-ASSOC woman-EMPH-ASSOC 3:DU:STAT-enter:come

sen kwiyo-wá-dí da-cu:de-ʔeʔe
man woman-EMPH-ASSOC 3:DU:STAT-enter:come

=== Noun hierarchy ===
Tewa has a noun hierarchy in order to determine which noun phrase goes in which position, however this only influences passive sentences. In Tewa, this is a simple binary distinction between animate and nonanimate noun phrases.

However, unlike in other languages with a noun hierarchy, such as Navajo, Tewa also marks the subject with the postposition -dí, meaning that there is not a concrete need to adhere to the noun hierarchy as that information is already morphologically encoded into sentences. Because of this, younger Tewa speakers tend to not use the noun hierarchy and instead rely on the morphology present in passive sentences.

=== Grammatical number ===
Tewa, like other Tanoan languages, has a trepartite number system, which means that nouns can be counted through different syntactic constructions in three ways. In English, with morphosyntactic differences exist only for two numbers: singular and plural. Tewa, on the other hand differentiates between singular, dual, and plural nouns.

However, Tewa also appears to group its nouns into two categories: those of "sets" and "entities", with sets being marked by the affix /-n/ and entities the lack of said affix. Because of this, when creating plurality out of an entity, the affix /-n/ must be removed and the base root will be one not seen outside of plurality or duality.

Tewa also has what is called "inverse" numbering, which is a feature of many Tanoan languages. A chart of the indefinite articles for "a, some" can help show this phenomenon:

| | Singular | Dual | Plural |
|---|---|---|---|
| Class I | wí | wên | wên |
| Class II | wên | wên | wí |
| Class III | wí | wên | wí |

As seen, that which marks singular for one class marks plural for another class and vice versa.

== Language revitalization ==
Esther Martinez, who lived to be 94 years old, was nationally known for her commitment to preserving the Tewa language. Her San Juan Pueblo Tewa Dictionary was published in 1982. The Esther Martinez Native American Languages Preservation Act is named for her, and as of September 15, 2012, members of the New Mexico congressional delegation have introduced legislation to extend the program for another five years.

Digital language documentation efforts were underway as of 1995.

Tewa language programs are available for children in most of the Tewa-speaking pueblos. The Santa Clara Pueblo Tewa Language Revitalization Program also sponsors cultural activities, such as visiting Crow Canyon.

Children's stories in Tewa have been digitized by the University of New Mexico, and are available online.

A 2012 documentary film, The Young Ancestors, follows a group of teenagers from Santa Fe Preparatory School as they learn the Tewa language in a self-study program with the help of a mentor, seventh grade literature teacher Laura Kaye Jagles.

Students and professors at Worcester Polytechnic Institute have designed TewaTalk, a language learning tool. TewaTalk would allow many people to learn the language. Virgie Bigbee, one of the many “voices” of TewaTalk, spent countless hours recording and uploading his talking in the Tewa Language. To help appeal to younger generations, the app also features learning games where students can apply their knowledge in addition to simple learning.
