= National Register of Historic Places listings in Santa Fe County, New Mexico =

Location of Santa Fe County in New Mexico

This is a list of the National Register of Historic Places listings in Santa Fe County, New Mexico.

This is intended to be a complete list of the properties and districts on the National Register of Historic Places in Santa Fe County, New Mexico, United States. Latitude and longitude coordinates are provided for many National Register properties and districts; these locations may be seen together in a map.

There are 99 properties and districts listed on the National Register in the county, including 8 National Historic Landmarks.

This National Park Service list is complete through NPS recent listings posted November 13, 2026.

Contents: NRHP in New Mexico by county
Bernalillo – Catron – Chaves – Cibola – Colfax – Curry – De Baca – Doña Ana – Eddy – Grant – Guadalupe – Harding – Hidalgo – Lea – Lincoln – Los Alamos – Luna – McKinley – Mora – Otero – Quay – Rio Arriba – Roosevelt – San Juan – San Miguel – Sandoval – Santa Fe – Sierra – Socorro – Taos – Torrance – Union – Valencia

== Existing listings ==
	Name on the Register	Image	Date listed	Location	City or town	Description
1	Acequia System of El Rancho de las Golondrinas	Acequia System of El Rancho de las Golondrinas	February 1, 1980 (#80002572)	12 miles southeast of Santa Fe; 35°34′28″N 106°06′33″W	Santa Fe	
2	Agua Fria Schoolhouse Site		June 13, 2019 (#100004033)	Address Restricted	Santa Fe vicinity	
3	Ricardo Alarid House	Ricardo Alarid House	August 30, 1984 (#84003054)	534 Alarid St. 35°40′56″N 105°57′07″W	Santa Fe	
4	Allison Dormitory	Allison Dormitory	November 29, 1984 (#84000431)	433 Paseo de Peralta; 35°41′34″N 105°56′11″W	Santa Fe	
5	Apache Canyon Railroad Bridge	Apache Canyon Railroad Bridge	April 27, 1979 (#79001553)	3 miles (4.8 km) northeast of Lamy over Galisteo Creek; 35°30′49″N 105°51′17″W	Lamy	
6	Archbishop Lamy's Chapel	Archbishop Lamy's Chapel	August 19, 1988 (#88000897)	Bishop's Lodge Rd. 35°43′50″N 105°54′32″W	Santa Fe	
7	Arroyo Hondo Pueblo		September 13, 2007 (#07000950)	Address Restricted	Santa Fe	
8	Bandelier National Monument	Bandelier National Monument	October 15, 1966 (#66000042)	12 miles (19 km) south of Los Alamos on State Road 4; 35°46′32″N 106°19′06″W	Los Alamos	Extends into Los Alamos and Sandoval Counties; includes Tsankawi detached portion. Boundary was increased 12/10/14
9	Barrio de Analco Historic District	Barrio de Analco Historic District	November 24, 1968 (#68000032)	Roughly bounded by E. De Vargas and College Sts. 35°41′00″N 105°56′11″W	Santa Fe	Contributing buildings
10	Jane and Gustave Baumann House and Studio	Jane and Gustave Baumann House and Studio	October 10, 2012 (#12000875)	409 Camino de Las Animas; 35°40′39″N 105°56′13″W	Santa Fe	Former residence of artist Gustave Baumann.
11	Alfred M. Bergere House	Alfred M. Bergere House	October 1, 1975 (#75001166)	135 Grant Ave. 35°41′21″N 105°56′22″W	Santa Fe	
12	Jean Bouquet Historic/Archeological District		January 5, 1983 (#83001628)	Address Restricted	Pojoaque	
13	Camino del Monte Sol Historic District	Camino del Monte Sol Historic District	July 11, 1988 (#88000440)	Roughly bounded by Acequia Madre, Camino del Monte Sol, El Caminito, and Garcia St. 35°40′41″N 105°55′46″W	Santa Fe	Contributing buildings
14	Camino Real-Alamitos Section		April 8, 2011 (#11000169)	Address Restricted	Santa Fe	part of the Camino Real in New Mexico, AD 1598-1881 Multiple Property Submission
15	Camino Real-Canon de las Bocas Section		April 8, 2011 (#11000170)	Address Restricted	Santa Fe	part of the Camino Real in New Mexico, AD 1598-1881 Multiple Property Submission
16	Camino Real-La Bajada Mesa Section	Camino Real-La Bajada Mesa Section	April 8, 2011 (#11000168)	Address Restricted	Santa Fe	part of the Camino Real in New Mexico, AD 1598-1881 Multiple Property Submission
17	Connor Hall	Connor Hall	September 22, 1988 (#88001561)	1060 Cerrillos Rd. at the New Mexico School for the Deaf; 35°40′34″N 105°57′25″W	Santa Fe	
18	Gregorio Crespin House	Gregorio Crespin House	May 29, 1975 (#75001167)	132 E. De Vargas St. 35°41′02″N 105°56′19″W	Santa Fe	
19	Randall Davey House	Randall Davey House	July 9, 1970 (#70000409)	Upper Canyon Rd. 35°41′23″N 105°53′17″W	Santa Fe	Former residence of artist Randall Davey, now Randall Davey Audubon Center & Sanctuary.
20	Delgado Street Bridge	Delgado Street Bridge	August 3, 2015 (#15000494)	Delgado St. over the Santa Fe River; 35°41′04″N 105°55′52″W	Santa Fe	
21	Digneo-Valdes House	Digneo-Valdes House	November 21, 1978 (#78001827)	1231 Paseo de Peralta; 35°40′53″N 105°56′23″W	Santa Fe	Brick house built in 1889 by Italian immigrant and building contractor Carlo Digneo
22	Dodge-Bailey House		May 8, 2007 (#07000414)	3775 Old Santa Fe Trail; 35°43′26″N 105°54′01″W	Santa Fe	
23	Don Gaspar Bridge	Don Gaspar Bridge	October 16, 2002 (#02001163)	Don Gaspar Ave. crossing over the Santa Fe River between Alameda and E. De Vargas Sts. 35°41′06″N 105°56′22″W	Santa Fe	
24	Don Gaspar Historic District	Don Gaspar Historic District	July 21, 1983 (#83001629)	Roughly bounded by the Old Santa Fe Trail, Paseo de Peralta, Don Cubero and Houghton; 35°40′42″N 105°56′28″W	Santa Fe	
25	El Camino Real de Tierra Adentro-La Bajada North Section		March 19, 2018 (#100002204)	Address restricted	La Cienega	
26	El Camino Real de Tierra Adentro-La Bajada South Section		March 19, 2018 (#100002205)	Address restricted	La Cienega	
27	El Puente de Los Hidalgos	El Puente de Los Hidalgos	July 25, 2001 (#01000771)	Grant Ave. approximately 50 yards north of its junction with Paseo de Peralta; 35°41′34″N 105°56′20″W	Santa Fe	
28	El Rancho de las Golondrinas	El Rancho de las Golondrinas	December 5, 2022 (#100008430)	334 Los Pinos Rd. 35°34′28″N 106°06′43″W	Santa Fe	
29	El Rancho de las Golondrinas Section-El Camino Real de Tierra Adento		September 25, 2013 (#13000774)	Address Restricted	Santa Fe	Part of the Camino Real in New Mexico, AD 1598-1881 MPS
30	El Santuario de Chimayo	El Santuario de Chimayo	April 15, 1970 (#70000412)	1 mile northwest of the Santa Cruz Reservoir Dam; 35°59′23″N 105°55′38″W	Chimayo	
31	El Zaguan	El Zaguan	August 1, 2008 (#08000732)	545 Canyon Rd. 35°40′56″N 105°55′47″W	Santa Fe	Former residence of Margretta Stewart Dietrich, now housing Historic Santa Fe Foundation.
32	Fairview Cemetery	Fairview Cemetery	January 20, 2005 (#04001517)	1134 Cerrillos Rd. 35°40′38″N 105°57′33″W	Santa Fe	
33	Federal Building	Federal Building	August 15, 1974 (#74001207)	Cathedral Pl. at Palace St. 35°41′13″N 105°56′11″W	Santa Fe	Now the Museum of Contemporary Native Arts
34	Fort Marcy Officer's Residence	Fort Marcy Officer's Residence	June 20, 1975 (#75001168)	116 Lincoln Ave. 35°41′19″N 105°56′17″W	Santa Fe	Former residence of Edgar Lee Hewett, now Museum of New Mexico Foundation offices.
35	Fort Marcy Ruins	Fort Marcy Ruins	April 14, 1975 (#75001169)	Off State Road 475; 35°41′23″N 105°55′48″W	Santa Fe	
36	Glorieta Baldy Lookout Tower		January 27, 1988 (#87002492)	Santa Fe National Forest; 35°39′00″N 105°47′57″W	La Cueva	
37	Glorieta Pass Battlefield	Glorieta Pass Battlefield	October 15, 1966 (#66000486)	10 miles southeast of Santa Fe on U.S. Routes 84/85; 35°33′36″N 105°47′08″W	Santa Fe	Site of American Civil War Battle of Glorieta Pass. Parts of the battlefield are now included in Pecos National Historical Park which includes Pecos Pueblo in San Miguel County.
38	Hayt-Wientge House	Hayt-Wientge House	May 6, 1977 (#77000929)	620 Paseo de la Cuma; 35°41′39″N 105°56′21″W	Santa Fe	
39	Hospital		September 22, 1988 (#88001562)	1060 Cerrillos Rd. at the New Mexico School for the Deaf; 35°40′37″N 105°57′23″W	Santa Fe	
40	Hyde Memorial State Park		August 2, 2021 (#100006766)	740 Hyde Park Rd. (NM 475); 35°44′12″N 105°50′10″W	Santa Fe vicinity	
41	Immaculate Heart of Mary Seminary		January 2, 2024 (#100009668)	49 & 50 Mt. Carmel Road; 35°40′08″N 105°55′13″W	Santa Fe	
42	J.B. Jackson House		June 4, 1999 (#99000598)	268 Los Pinos Rd. 35°34′54″N 106°06′12″W	Santa Fe	
43	Everret Jones House		January 15, 2004 (#03001411)	210 Brownell Howland Rd. 35°43′26″N 105°54′01″W	Santa Fe	
44	Daniel T. Kelly House	Daniel T. Kelly House	October 19, 2005 (#05001182)	531 E. Palace Ave. 35°41′14″N 105°55′44″W	Santa Fe	
45	K'uuyemugeh		August 3, 2015 (#15000496)	Address Restricted	Cuyamungue	
46	La Armeria de Santa Fe		August 16, 2011 (#11000530)	1050 Old Pecos Tr. 35°40′24″N 105°56′13″W	Santa Fe	
47	La Bajada Mesa Agricultural Site		December 15, 1983 (#83004178)	Address Restricted	La Bajada	
48	La Cieneguilla South Section-El Camino Real de Tierra Adento		September 25, 2013 (#13000775)	Address Restricted	La Cienega	Part of the Camino Real in New Mexico, AD 1598-1881 MPS
49	La Iglesia de Santa Cruz and Site of the Plaza of Santa Cruz de la Canada	La Iglesia de Santa Cruz and Site of the Plaza of Santa Cruz de la Canada	August 17, 1973 (#73001148)	100 block of Santa Cruz Plaza; 35°59′26″N 106°02′50″W	Espanola	
50	Laboratory of Anthropology	Laboratory of Anthropology	July 12, 1983 (#83001630)	708 Camino Lejo; 35°39′52″N 105°55′28″W	Santa Fe	
51	Laboratory of Anthropology Director's Residence		May 30, 2023 (#100009036)	750 Camino Lejo; 35°39′58″N 105°55′27″W	Santa Fe	Now houses the Museum of Spanish Colonial Art.
52	Lamy Junction Archeological District		June 13, 2016 (#16000388)	Address Restricted	Lamy	
53	Las Acequias		July 25, 2008 (#08000697)	22A Rancho Las Acequias; 35°53′45″N 105°59′40″W	Santa Fe	part of the Buildings Designed by John Gaw Meem Multiple Property Submission
54	Lujan-Ortiz House		January 14, 2000 (#99001680)	1 mile from State Road 502 on County Road 84; 35°53′11″N 106°03′31″W	Jaconita	
55	Madrid Historic District	Madrid Historic District	November 9, 1977 (#77000928)	25 miles southwest of Santa Fe on State Road 14; 35°24′24″N 106°09′11″W	Madrid	
56	Dorothy McKibbin House		November 10, 2026 (#100013364)	1099 Old Santa Fe Trail; 35°40′06″N 105°55′30″W	Santa Fe	
56	John Gaw and Faith Bemis Meem House		April 3, 2017 (#100000828)	3707 Old Santa Fe Trail; 35°40′01″N 105°55′09″W	Santa Fe	
57	National Park Service Southwest Regional Office	National Park Service Southwest Regional Office	October 6, 1970 (#70000067)	Old Santa Fe Trail; 35°40′01″N 105°55′21″W	Santa Fe	
58	Navawi	Navawi	December 8, 1982 (#82001052)	On a bluff above State Route 4, 1.8 miles north of the Rover Boulevard intersection 35°50′53″N 106°12′51″W	White Rock	
59	New Mexico Supreme Court Building	New Mexico Supreme Court Building	January 18, 2002 (#01001468)	237 Don Gaspar Ave. 35°41′04″N 105°56′21″W	Santa Fe	
60	New Mexico Territorial and State Capitol	New Mexico Territorial and State Capitol	February 28, 2025 (#100011470)	407 Galisteo Street; 35°41′02″N 105°56′32″W	Santa Fe	Now known as the Bataan Memorial Building.
61	B. J. O. and Margaret Doolittle Nordfeldt House	B. J. O. and Margaret Doolittle Nordfeldt House	January 2, 2020 (#100004822)	460 Camino de las Animas; 35°40′39″N 105°56′06″W	Santa Fe	
62	Nuestra Senora de Luz Church and Cemetery	Nuestra Senora de Luz Church and Cemetery	December 14, 1995 (#95001452)	13 miles southeast of Santa Fe, north of an Interstate 25 frontage road 35°32′58″N 105°49′32″W	Canoncito	
63	Otowi Historic District	Otowi Historic District	December 4, 1975 (#75001170)	25 miles north of Santa Fe, on State Road 4 in the Rio Grande valley 35°52′31″N 106°08′31″W	Santa Fe	
64	Otowi Suspension Bridge	Otowi Suspension Bridge	July 15, 1997 (#97000730)	State Road 4 over the Rio Grande; 35°52′29″N 106°08′29″W	San Ildefonso Pueblo	
65	Palace of the Governors	Palace of the Governors	October 15, 1966 (#66000489)	Palace Avenue at Santa Fe Plaza; 35°41′16″N 105°56′15″W	Santa Fe	
66	Petroglyph Hill		November 16, 2015 (#15000851)	Address Restricted	Galisteo	
67	Pflueger General Merchandise Store and Annex Saloon	Pflueger General Merchandise Store and Annex Saloon	June 23, 1987 (#87000519)	State Road 41; 35°28′51″N 105°52′48″W	Lamy	Now houses the Lamy Railroad and History Museum
68	Plaza del Cerro		July 17, 1972 (#72000810)	Southwest of the junction of State Roads 4 and 76; 36°00′04″N 105°55′54″W	Chimayo	
69	Pond-Kelly House		October 19, 2018 (#100003031)	535 E Palace Ave. 35°41′06″N 105°55′43″W	Santa Fe	
70	Pueblo of Nambe	Pueblo of Nambe	January 21, 1974 (#74001208)	About 16 miles off State Road 4; 35°53′05″N 105°57′52″W	Nambé Pueblo	
71	Pueblo of Tesuque	Pueblo of Tesuque	July 16, 1973 (#73001149)	About 8 miles north of Santa Fe on the western bank of the Tesuque River; 35°48′10″N 105°58′31″W	Tesuque Pueblo	
72	Reredos of Our Lady of Light	Reredos of Our Lady of Light	September 4, 1970 (#70000411)	Christo Rey Church, Canyon Rd. and Cristo Rey St. 35°40′43″N 105°55′00″W	Santa Fe	Removed from the old Military Chapel on the Santa Fe Plaza.
73	Route 66 and National Old Trails Road Historic District at La Bajada	Route 66 and National Old Trails Road Historic District at La Bajada	June 30, 2005 (#05000633)	Approximately 0.5 miles northeast of the northern terminus of State Road 16; 35°33′31″N 106°13′35″W	La Bajada	
74	Ignacio Roybal House		February 13, 1986 (#86000227)	County Road 84 west of State Road 4 and U.S. Routes 84/285; 35°53′27″N 106°02′28″W	Jacona	
75	St. John's College-Santa Fe, New Mexico	St. John's College-Santa Fe, New Mexico	August 3, 2015 (#15000495)	1160 Camino Cruz Blanca; 35°40′00″N 105°54′45″W	Santa Fe	
76	San Ildefonso Pueblo	San Ildefonso Pueblo	June 20, 1974 (#74001206)	Southwest of Espanola off State Road 4; 35°53′29″N 106°07′05″W	San Ildefonso Pueblo	
77	San Jose Hall	San Jose Hall	May 26, 2015 (#15000264)	5637 NM 41; 35°23′45″N 105°56′48″W	Galisteo	
78	San Lazaro		October 15, 1966 (#66000490)	Address Restricted	Santa Fe	
79	San Marcos Pueblo		March 26, 1982 (#82003326)	Address Restricted	Capitan	
80	Santa Fe Historic District	Santa Fe Historic District	July 23, 1973 (#73001150)	Roughly bounded by Camino Cabra, Camino de las Animas, W. Manhattan Ave., S. St. Francis Dr., and Griffin St. 35°41′13″N 105°56′06″W	Santa Fe	
81	Santa Fe National Cemetery	Santa Fe National Cemetery	September 6, 2016 (#16000588)	501 N. Guadalupe St. 35°42′03″N 105°56′50″W	Santa Fe	
82	Santa Fe Plaza	Santa Fe Plaza	October 15, 1966 (#66000491)	Santa Fe Plaza; 35°41′14″N 105°56′15″W	Santa Fe	
83	Santa Fe River Park Channel	Santa Fe River Park Channel	December 10, 2008 (#08001181)	Santa Fe River Park; 35°41′03″N 105°55′42″W	Santa Fe	
84	Santa Fe Trail-Apache Canyon Bridge Site		November 7, 2012 (#12000912)	Across Galisteo Cr. 35°30′44″N 105°51′18″W	Glorieta	Part of the Santa Fe Trail MPS
85	Albert Schmidt House and Studio		July 25, 2003 (#03000691)	1505 A and B Bishop's Lodge Rd. 35°45′21″N 105°55′25″W	Tesuque	
86	School Building Number 2	School Building Number 2	September 22, 1988 (#88001560)	1060 Cerrillos Rd. at the New Mexico School for the Deaf; 35°40′35″N 105°57′24″W	Santa Fe	
87	Scottish Rite Cathedral	Scottish Rite Cathedral	March 13, 1987 (#87000424)	463 Paseo de Peralta; 35°41′30″N 105°56′09″W	Santa Fe	
88	Second Ward School	Second Ward School	March 30, 1978 (#78001828)	312 Sandoval St. 35°41′09″N 105°56′37″W	Santa Fe	
89	Seton Village	Seton Village	October 15, 1966 (#66000492)	6 miles south of Santa Fe off U.S. Route 84; 35°35′56″N 105°55′54″W	Santa Fe	
90	Eugenie Shonnard House		September 5, 1975 (#75001171)	Address Restricted	Santa Fe	Former residence of artist Eugenie Shonnard.
91	Spiegelberg House	Spiegelberg House	May 25, 1973 (#73001151)	237 E. Palace St. 35°41′13″N 105°56′00″W	Santa Fe	
92	Superintendent's Residence		September 22, 1988 (#88001563)	1060 Cerrillos Rd. at the New Mexico School for the Deaf; 35°40′37″N 105°57′17″W	Santa Fe	
93	Pinckney R. Tully House	Pinckney R. Tully House	November 5, 1974 (#74001209)	136 Grant Ave. 35°41′26″N 105°56′24″W	Santa Fe	
94	U.S. Courthouse	U.S. Courthouse	May 25, 1973 (#73001152)	106 S. Federal Pl. 35°41′27″N 105°56′12″W	Santa Fe	
95	U.S. Post Office and Federal Building	U.S. Post Office and Federal Building	December 20, 2022 (#100008474)	120 S. Federal Pl. 35°41′29″N 105°56′19″W	Santa Fe	Now the Joseph M. Montoya Federal Building
96	Carlos Vierra House	Carlos Vierra House	August 3, 1979 (#79001554)	1002 Old Pecos Trail; 35°40′28″N 105°56′12″W	Santa Fe	Former residence of artist Carlos Vierra, an early example of Pueblo Revival architecture in Santa Fe.
97	Donaciano Vigil House	Donaciano Vigil House	June 28, 1972 (#72000811)	518 Alto St. 35°41′16″N 105°56′45″W	Santa Fe	
98	Wheelwright Museum of the American Indian	Wheelwright Museum of the American Indian	December 18, 1990 (#90001917)	704 Camino Lejo; 35°39′45″N 105°55′38″W	Santa Fe	

== See also ==
- List of National Historic Landmarks in New Mexico
- National Register of Historic Places listings in New Mexico

== Notes ==
A. While the NRIS lists the tower as being in San Miguel County, the map included with its nomination places it within Santa Fe County.
