= Santuario de Guadalupe =

- U.S. Historic district – Contributing property
- NM State Register of Cultural Properties
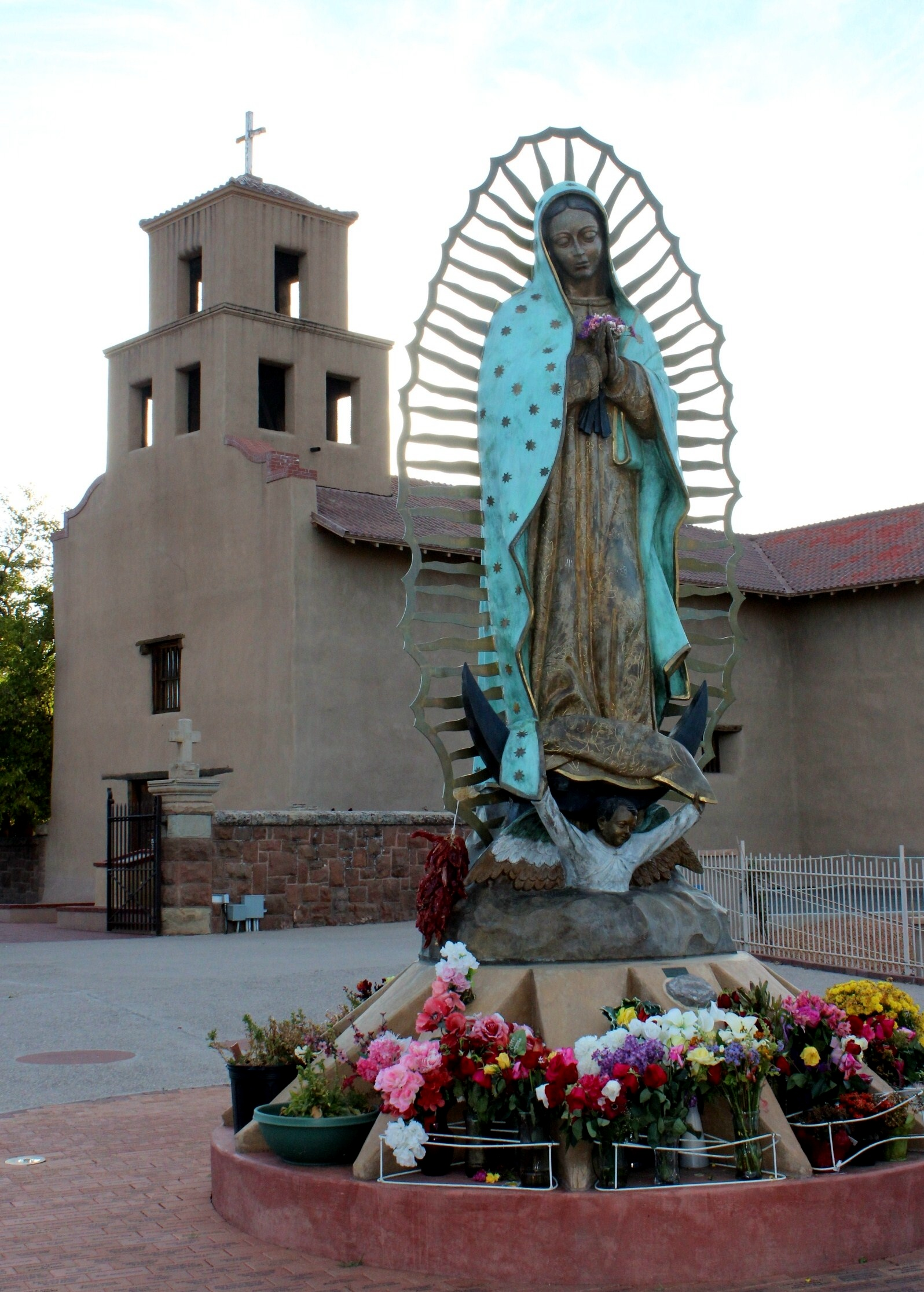
- The church in 2012

- Location within New Mexico Location within the United States
- Location: 417 Agua Fria St., Santa Fe, New Mexico
- Coordinates: 35°41′13″N 105°56′42″W
- Built: c. 1795
- Part of: Santa Fe Historic District (ID73001150)
- NMSRCP No.: 72

Significant dates
- Designated CP: July 23, 1973
- Designated NMSRCP: May 23, 1969

The Santuario de Nuestra Señora de Guadalupe is a historic Catholic shrine in Santa Fe, New Mexico. It is the oldest church in the United States dedicated to Our Lady of Guadalupe and is listed on the New Mexico State Register of Cultural Properties. It is also a contributing property in the Santa Fe Historic District.

The church is a simple cruciform building with thick adobe walls and has been remodeled several times, most recently in the 1970s.

== History ==
The church was built sometime between the late 1700s and early 1800s, though its exact date of construction is unknown. The records of the Archdiocese of Santa Fe suggest it was built around 1795, as a license authorizing its construction was issued that year. However, the church's existence was not definitively documented until 1821. Conversely, at least one source claimed the church is much older, dating to before the Pueblo Revolt of 1680, though this is probably apocryphal. The famous altar screen depicting Our Lady of Guadalupe, transported in pieces from Mexico City over the Camino Real, is signed by José de Alcíbar and dated 1783.

The church remained active until the 1830s, but by the time the U.S. Army occupied the city in 1846, it was little-used and in disrepair. A visitor in 1881, John Gregory Bourke, wrote

It shows great age in its present condition quite as much as in the archaic style of its construction. The exterior is dilapidated and time-worn; but the interior is kept clean and in good order and in very much the condition it must have shown generations ago. The pictures are nearly all venerable daubs, with few pretensions to artistic merit. At present, I am not informed upon this point and cannot speak with assurance, but I am strongly suspect that most of them were the work of priests connected with the early missions of Mexico. Many of the frames are tin. The arrangement for lighting this chapel are the old-time tapers in tin sconces referred to in the description of San Francisco and San Miguel. The beams and timber exposed to sight have been chopped out with axes or adses, which would seem to indicate that this sacred edifice was completed or at least commenced before the work of colonization had made much progress.

At the time of Bourke's description, the church was only being used once a year for the festival of Our Lady of Guadalupe on December 12. However, after the Denver and Rio Grande Railroad arrived in Santa Fe in 1880, Archbishop Jean-Baptiste Lamy arranged to have it repaired to serve the new English-speaking population brought by the railroad. A native of France, Lamy preferred European architectural styles over the local adobe vernacular and had the church remodeled with a pitched roof and steeple starting in 1881.

On June 27, 1922, the steeple and roof were destroyed by a fire that also damaged the interior, though the altar screen survived. The church was then rebuilt in the Mission Revival style with curved parapets and a tiled roof. It was remodeled again in 1976–78 to bring it closer to the original appearance, though some of the Mission details remain in place. Since the opening of a new church next door in 1961, it is no longer an active parish church but is still used for monthly masses.
