= El Zaguan =

- U.S. National Register of Historic Places
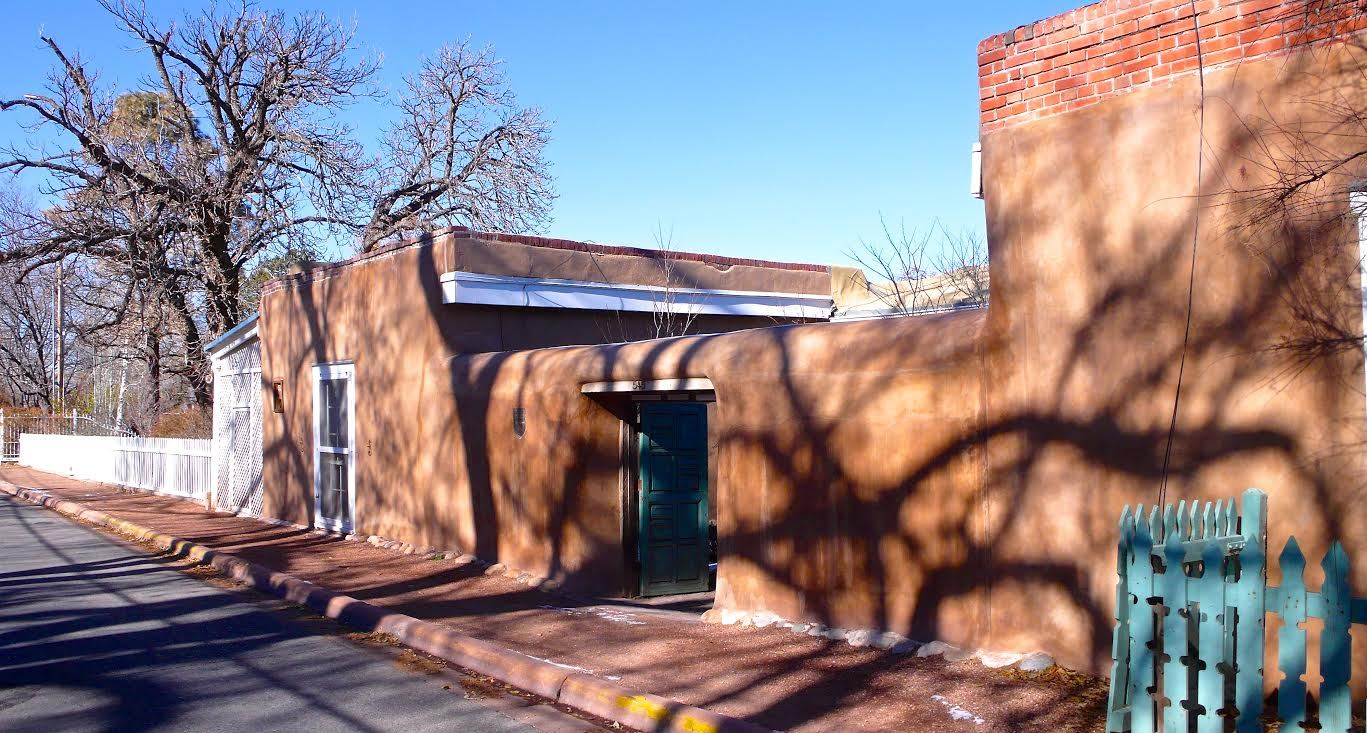

- Location within New Mexico
- Location: 545 Canyon Rd., Santa Fe, New Mexico
- Coordinates: 35°40′56″N 105°55′47″W
- Area: 1.8 acres (0.73 ha)
- Built: 1854
- Architect: Kate Chapman
- Architectural style: Territorial Revival
- NRHP reference No.: 08000732
- Added to NRHP: August 1, 2008

El Zaguan, at 545 Canyon Rd. in Santa Fe, New Mexico, is a historic complex started in 1854. It was listed on the National Register of Historic Places in 2008. The listing included two contributing buildings, three contributing structures, two contributing objects, and a contributing site on 1.8 acres (0.73 ha).

It is Territorial Revival in style. A zaguan is a compound with a street doorway entrance usually leading back to a courtyard, which is surrounded by one-deep rooms.

This has also been known as the James L. Johnson House, and is a former residence of Margretta Stewart Dietrich, and later housed the Historic Santa Fe Foundation.

It was purchased in 1928 by Margretta Dietrich. Changes were made under direction of Santa Fe designer Kate Chapman.

== History ==
Historically, the property at 545 Canyon Road was a modest adobe farmhouse. In 1854, James L. Johnson, a well-to-do merchant who was linked to the trade network of the Santa Fe Trail, purchased the house for $250. He and his wife expanded the property adding an additional multi-roomed house, large gardens fed by an acequia to which he had water rights. Other structures the Johnsons built include corrals and stables, chicken coops, hog pens and a smoke shed. The Johnsons eventually expanded the El Zaguan into a mansion of 24 rooms with a library overlooking the garden and a private chapel.

Johnson was forced to mortgage the property to a local lawyer and politician, Thomas B. Catron. In 1881, Johnson defaulted on the mortgage, and the property was transferred to Catron, although the Johnsons continued to live there. In 1918, Caton sold the property to James Baca who was the Johnson's grandson. Later, after it was purchased by Margretta Stewart Dietrich who saved it from demolition, and it operated as a hotel, as well as an apartment complex. Following Dietrich's death, the property was acquired by the El Zaguan, Inc. corporation, owned by John Gaw Meem, a well-known local architect. In 1979, the property was transferred to the Historic Santa Fe Foundation.

== Architecture ==
El Zaguan is considered one of the "best examples in Santa Fe of the transition from the Territorial to the modern period. The oldest parts of the structure is built of adobe in the Spanish Pueblo style, while latter additions built by Johnson were in the Territorial Style, and included a wooden patio with large panes of glass that were unusual in New Mexico at the time.

When placed on the National Register of Historic Places, the domestic home part of the property consisted of a one-story Territorial Style adobe structure with brick parapets along the roof line. The home has a "rambling floor plan connected by a zaguán (courtyard). There are two attached adobe garages, a horno (outdoor oven) and a stone retaining wall.

The façade is 150 feet long, located on the north side of Canyon Road in the Santa Fe Historic District. James L. Johnson installed four tall, double hung wooden windows, with 9/6 lights and three windows with 2/2 lights. Additional casement and double hung windows were installed after the house passed on to Catron. The doors to the zaguán are wood and green glass.

== Historic acequia ==
In 2022-23 the historic acequia was restored in the garden at El Zaguan. The acequia was built in the 1850s by Maria Jesusita Johnson who was Johnson's wife from Mexico. The stone-lined irrigation ditch is fed by the Acequia Madre, the "mother ditch" of Santa Fe. After the McClure Reservoir was built in the 1940s, water to this section of the acequia was cut off. The current water source for the restored El Zaguan acequia comes from well water. Many of the plantings in the garden were imported from colonial Spain, while others were brought by later homesteaders and settlers.

== Gallery ==
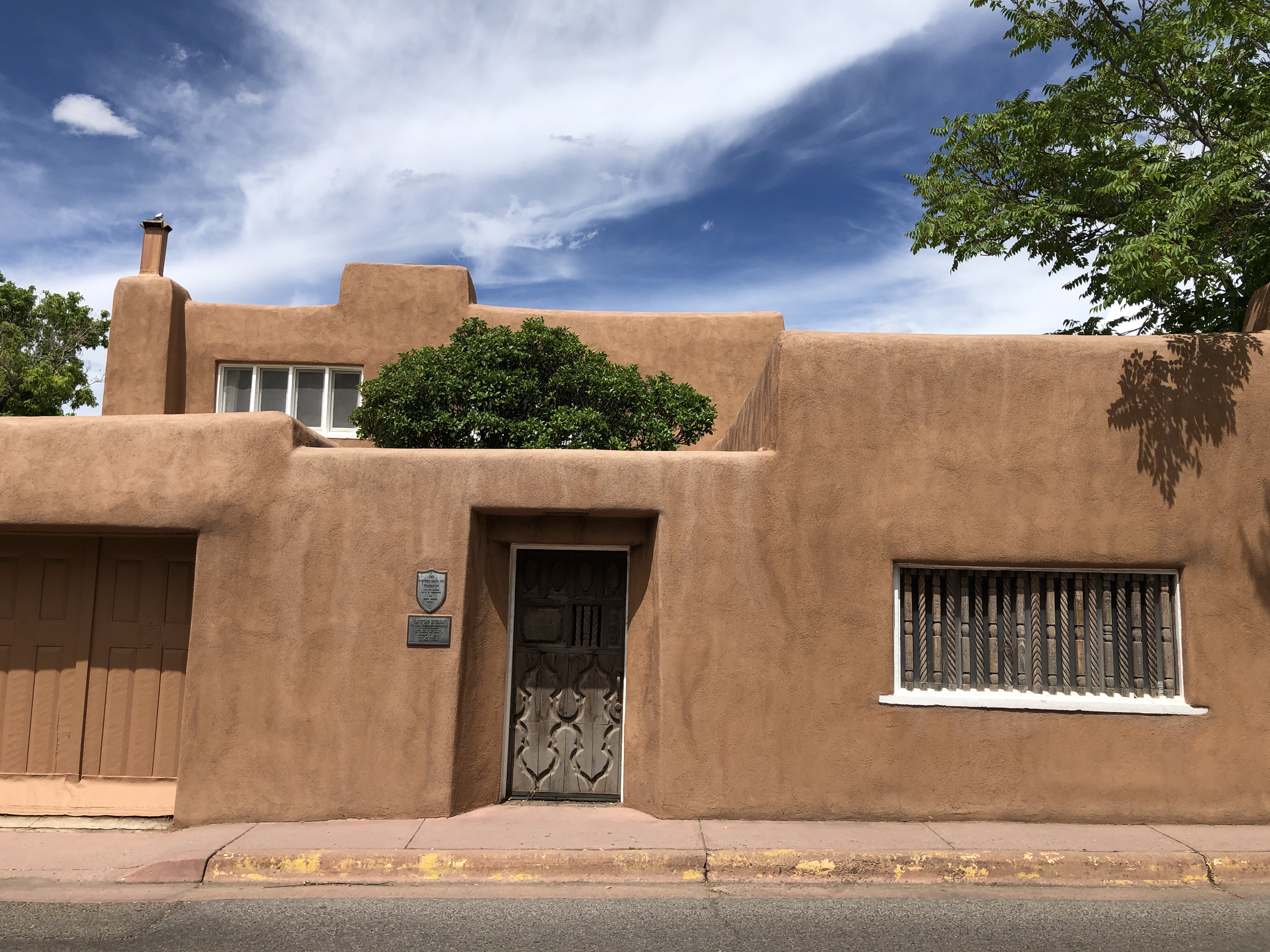
El Zaguan, Santa Fe, Historic Santa Fe, facade

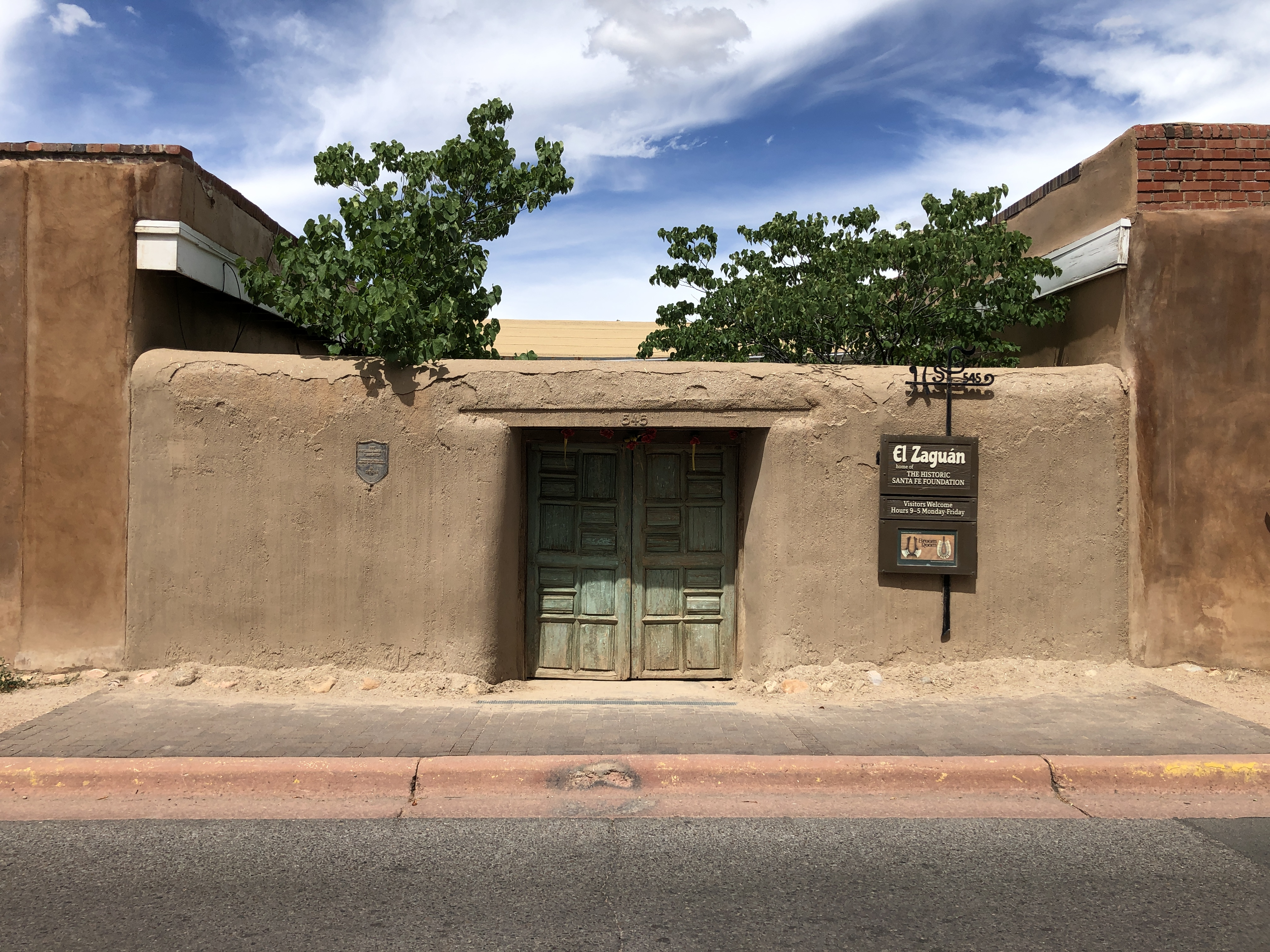
El Zaguan, Santa Fe, South facade detail, front entrance

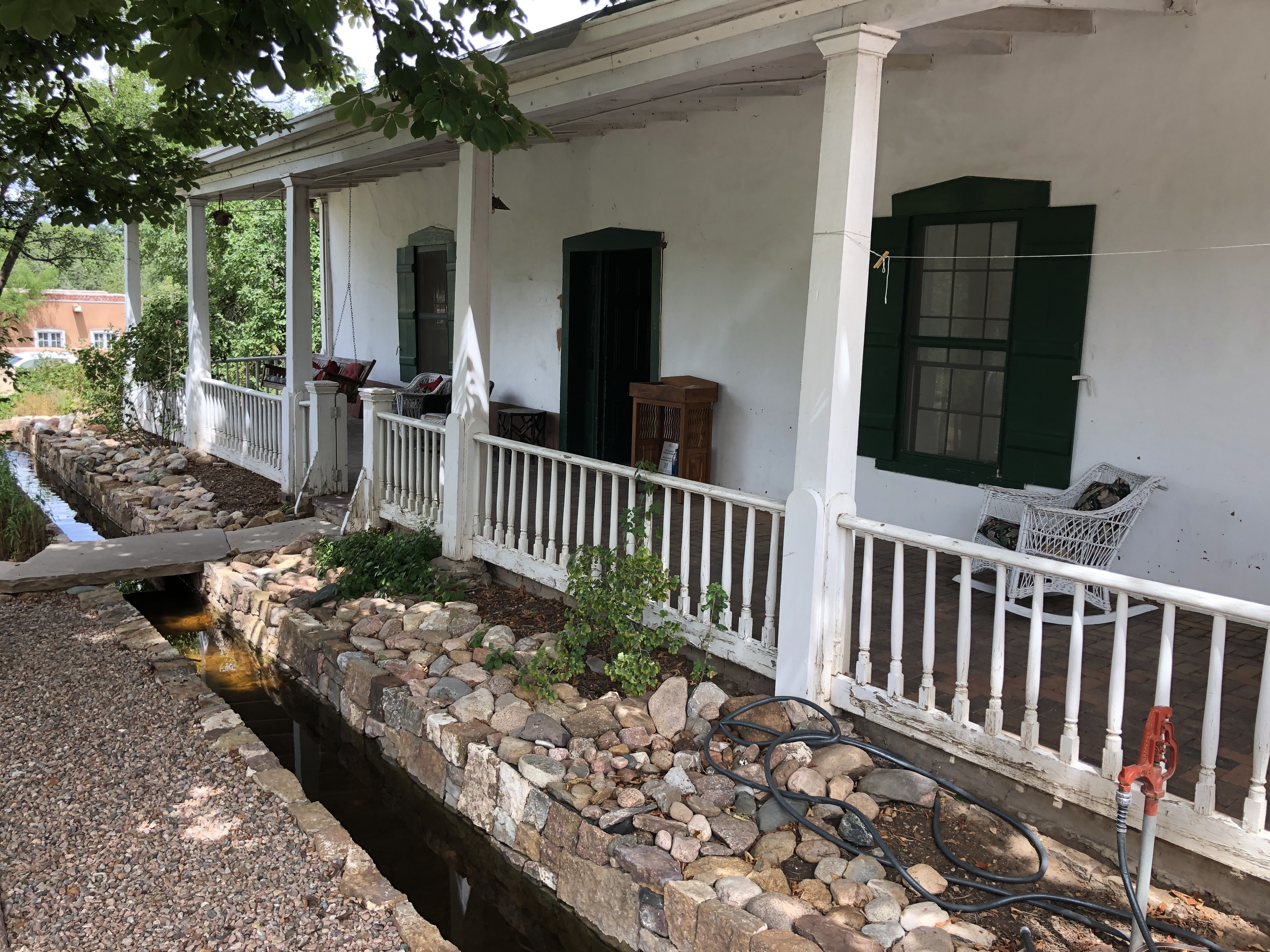
El Zaguan, Santa Fe, west patio with restored acequia adjacent to the garden

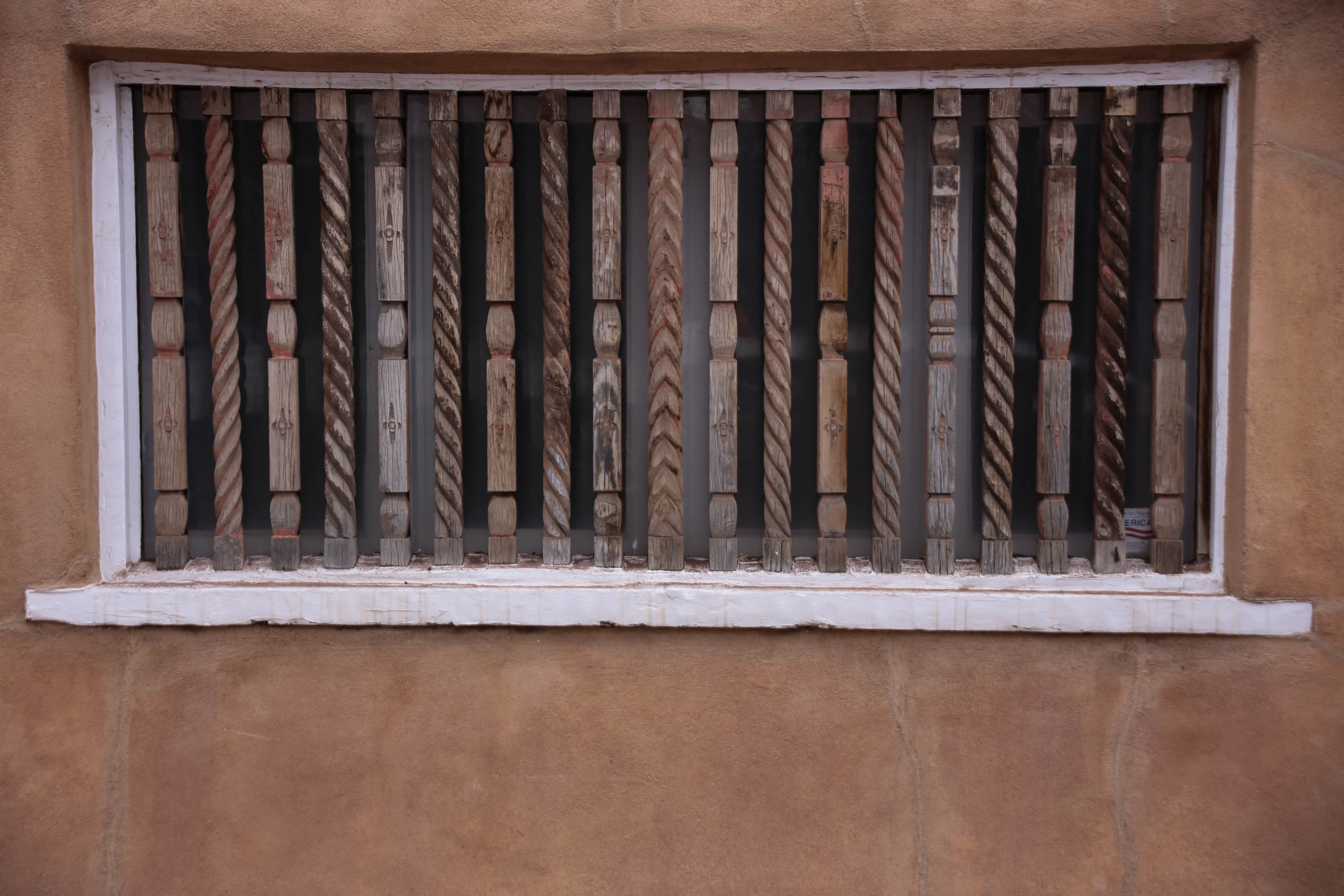
ornamental wood-barred window

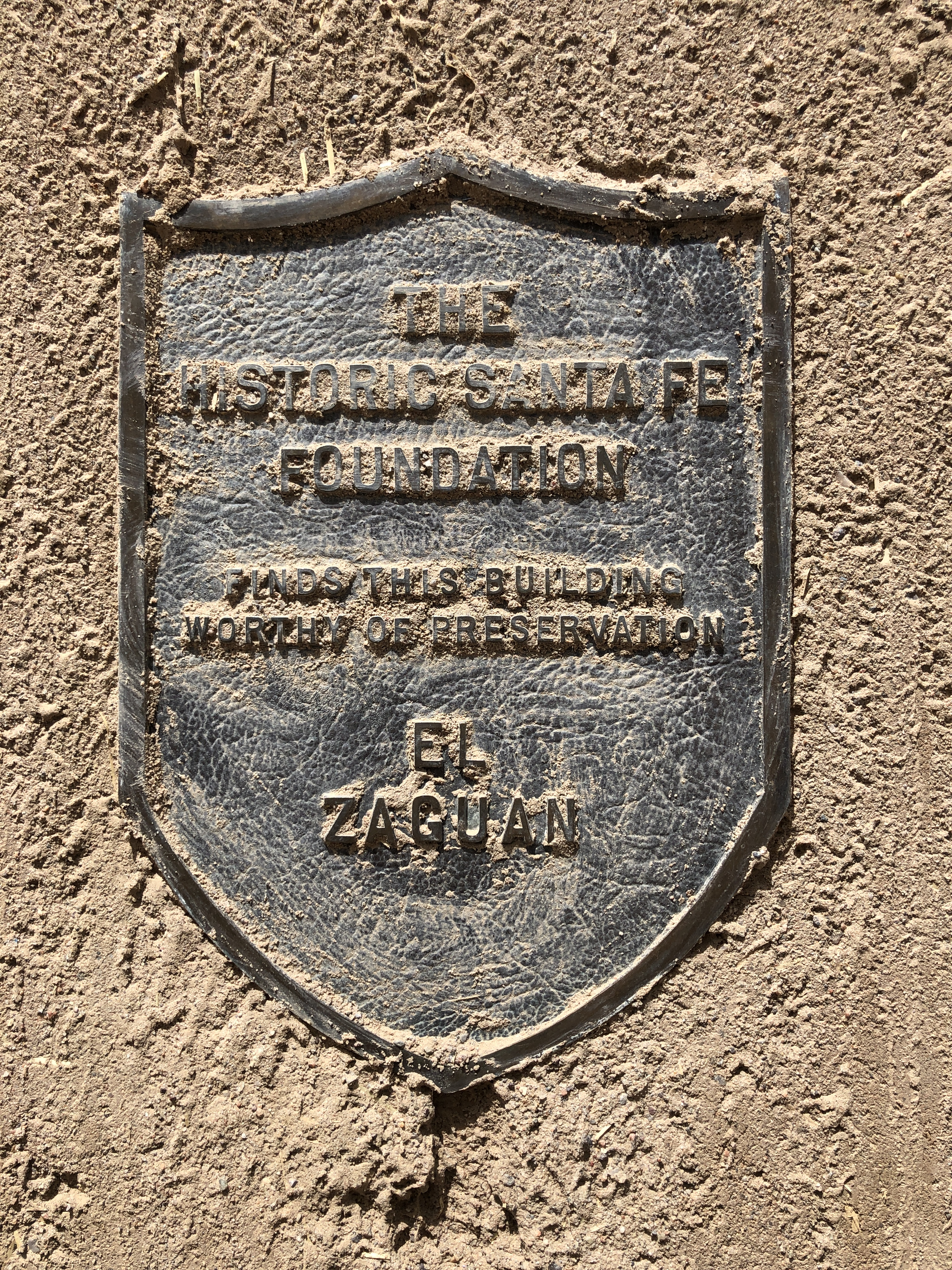
El Zaguan, Santa Fe, Historic Santa Fe Foundation plaque
