= Dorothy Stewart =

American artist

Dorothy Newkirk Stewart was an American printer, printmaker and artist.

== Early life and education ==
She was born April 8, 1891, in Philadelphia to Dr. William Shaw and Delia Allman Stewart. Her parents sent her and her sister Margretta to a private school in Philadelphia.

Stewart started making art in 1925. She studied at the Pennsylvania Academy of the Fine Arts, her focus being on pantomime, stage design, and fresco painting. In 1921, she traveled to Italy, Greece and France, where she became a student of the American School of Fine Arts.

== Career ==
Stewart became well known for her drawings, paintings, block prints and linoleum prints. Dorothy signed her prints with the initials, D.N.S.

Dorothy Stewart and her sister Margretta Dietrich settled in Santa Fe, New Mexico, in 1925.

In 1936, she was considered one of the members of the WPA Artist Collective in New Mexico. She painted a mural for the entrance of Albuquerque's Little Theatre depicting a clash between Christians and Moors portrayed in New Mexican folk plays.

She acquired a type and printing press from a defunct Spanish language newspaper in Espanola in 1948, and this is when Dorothy started producing vibrant multicolored illustrated books. Stewart was one of the first women to run a private printing press in the Southwest. (Smith, 94)

Of the two sisters, Dorothy was more social. She built a studio east of El Zaguán where the artist hosted concerts, lectures, shadow puppet plays, and exhibitions representing her wide range of interest. (Smith, 96) El Zaguán still retains an artist residency program with exhibits under the Historic Santa Fe Foundation.

== Death ==
In the winter of 1955, with a grave medical condition, Stewart was accompanied by her dear friend Maria Chabot to Oaxaca, Mexico where Dorothy was quoted as saying, “If I have to be sick, I would rather be sick here where I hear the street sounds of Mexico.” As Dorothy's condition worsened, Chabot moved her to the American British Cowdry Hospital in Mexico City, where Stewart died of a brain hemorrhage on December 24, 1955.

== Publications ==
- Hornacinas, Niches and Corners of Mexico City; publisher: Editorial Cultura Mexico City, Mexico 1933. Book featuring the sculpture figures of saints on buildings and various architecture charcoal sketches of buildings.
- Pamphlet Adobe Notes, Laughing Horse Press, 1930, Printed by Spud Johnson. Manual focuses on traditional Southwest Building techniques, featuring Dorothy's linoleum block illustrations; Under Stewart's company, Pictograph Press
- Hamlet Prince of Denmark 1949
- San Cristobal Petroglyphs 1950
- Handbook of Indian Dances. Features paintings by Pueblo Indians, Hall of Ethnology in Association with Museum of New Mexico, Santa Fe 1952
- A Midsummer Night's Dream 1953

== Sources ==
- Mullin, Molly H. Culture In The Marketplace: Gender, Art. Durham & London: Duke University Press, 2001. Print.
- Smith, Pamela S. Passions In Print: Private Press Artistry in New Mexico 1834–Present. Santa Fe: Museum of New Mexico Press, 2006. Print.
- Artists of the American West. A biographical dictionary. Volume II. By Doris Ostrander Dawdy. Chicago: Sage Books/Swallow Press, 1981. (ArtsAmW 2)
- Dictionary of Women Artists. An international dictionary of women artists born before 1900. By Chris Petteys. Boston: G.K. Hall & Co., 1985. (DcWomA)
- Who Was Who in American Art. 400 years of artists in America. Second edition. Three volumes. Edited by Peter Hastings Falk. Madison, CT: Sound View Press, 1999. (WhAmArt 2)
- Index to Women of the World from Ancient to Modern Times. Biographies and portraits. By Norma Olin Ireland. Westwood, MA: F.W. Faxon Co., 1970. (InWom)
- Biography Index. A cumulative index to biographical material in books and magazines. Volume 3: September, 1952-August, 1955. New York: H.W. Wilson Co., 1956. (BioIn 3)
- An Encyclopedia of Women Artists of the American West. By Phil Kovinick and Marian Yoshiki-Kovinick. Austin, TX: University of Texas Press, 1998. (EncWomA)
