= El Rancho de las Golondrinas =

- Acequia System of El Rancho de las Golondrinas
- U.S. National Register of Historic Places
- NM State Register of Cultural Properties
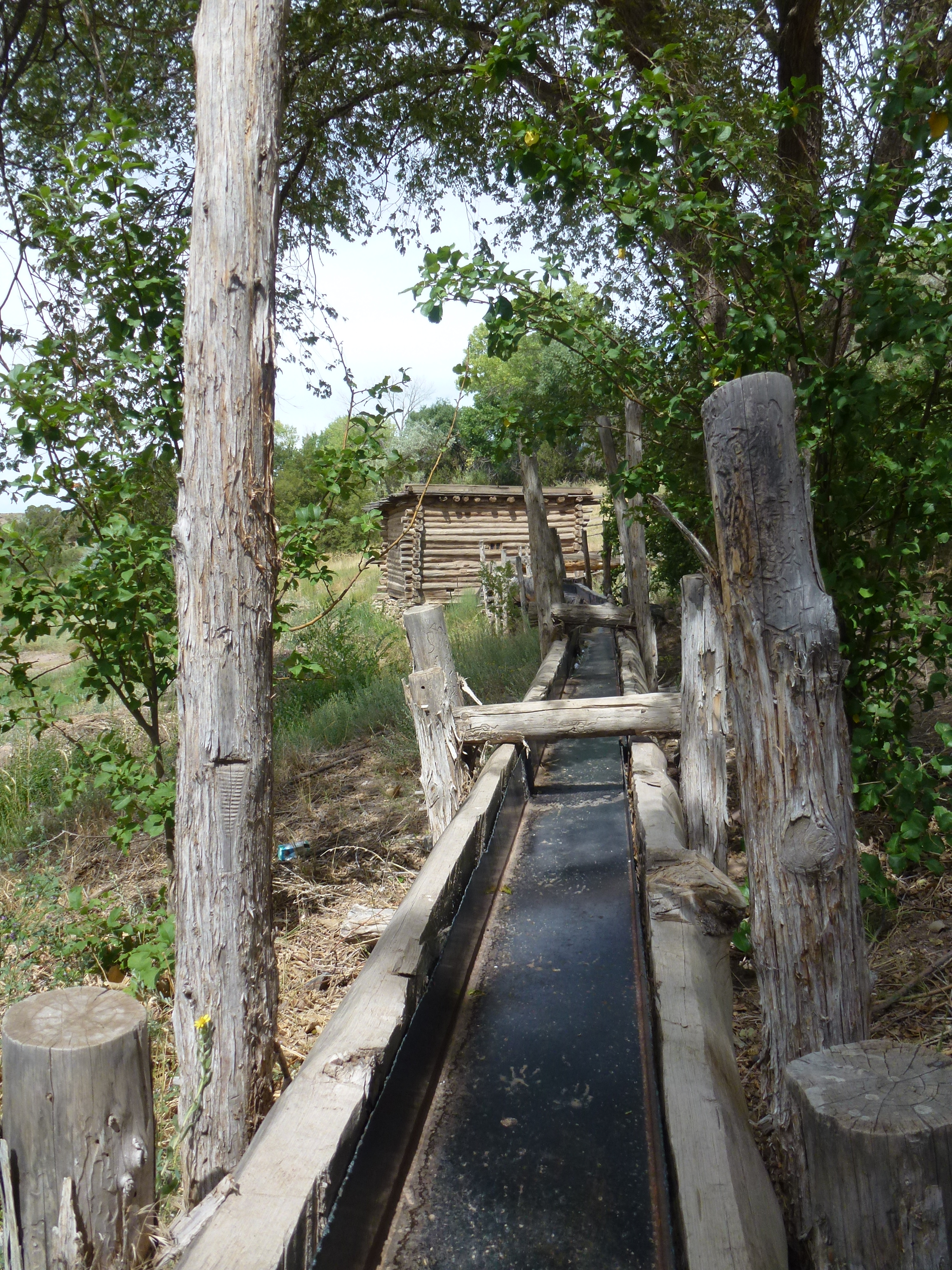
- Golondrinas Acequia flume

- Location within New Mexico Location within the United States
- Nearest city: Santa Fe, New Mexico
- Coordinates: 35°34′28″N 106°6′33″W
- Area: 3.4 acres (1.4 ha)
- NRHP reference No.: 80002572
- NMSRCP No.: 219

Significant dates
- Added to NRHP: February 1, 1980
- Designated NMSRCP: August 6, 1971

El Rancho de las Golondrinas (The Ranch of the Swallows), a historic rancho and now a living history museum, is strategically located on what was once the Camino Real, the Royal Road that extended from Mexico City to Santa Fe. The ranch provided goods for trade and was a place where the caravans that plied the road would stop on their journey coming from or going to Santa Fe. It was a paraje, an official rest stop for travelers, and was even mentioned by the colonial military leader and governor, Don Juan Bautista de Anza, when he stopped here with his expeditionary force in 1780.

El Rancho de las Golondrinas, located on 500 acres in the rural farming valley of La Ciénega just south of Santa Fe, New Mexico, strives to maintain examples of life during the period when Spain ruled in the southwestern portion of the North and most of the Central American continent. The museum opened in 1972 and is dedicated to the history, heritage and culture of 18th and 19th century New Mexico. Guides are dressed in period clothing and demonstrate weaving, hide tanning, milling, blacksmithing and the planting of crops. In addition to normal hours of operation there are ten annual festivals at El Rancho de las Golondrinas. The ranch and its acequia system (irrigation ditch complex) are listed on the National Register of Historic Places^{[1]} and the New Mexico State Register of Cultural Properties.

== History ==
In 1932, Leonora Frances Curtin (later Paloheimo) and her mother purchased the ranch property. Leonora is known for the founding of Santa Fe's Native Market in an effort to save and reestablish traditional craft forms and techniques, and to provide local artisans with a source of income during the Great Depression. After their marriage in 1946, Leonora and her Finnish husband, Yrjö Alfred (Y.A.) Paloheimo, saw the potential in the old ranch as a site for a living history museum. Both Leonora and Y.A. devoted themselves to transforming the property into a place where visitors could physically engage with the rich culture of the region and become immersed in the history of New Mexico. Existing historic buildings were restored, period structures were erected and historic buildings were brought in from other sites around New Mexico. The museum officially opened its doors in the spring of 1972 and over time has grown into New Mexico's premier living history museum. Today the museum promotes and preserves the Hispano heritage of Northern New Mexico, while at the same time building a better understanding of the lasting influence of Hispanos in the Southwest and the rest of the country.

== Filmography ==
El Rancho de las Golondrinas has been seen in numerous Western films. Some movies filmed here include Butch and Sundance: The Early Days (1979), Wild Times (1980) the CBS miniseries Comanche Moon (2008), and the Better Call Saul episodes "The Guy for This" and "Dedicado a Max".

== See also ==
- National Register of Historic Places listings in Santa Fe County, New Mexico

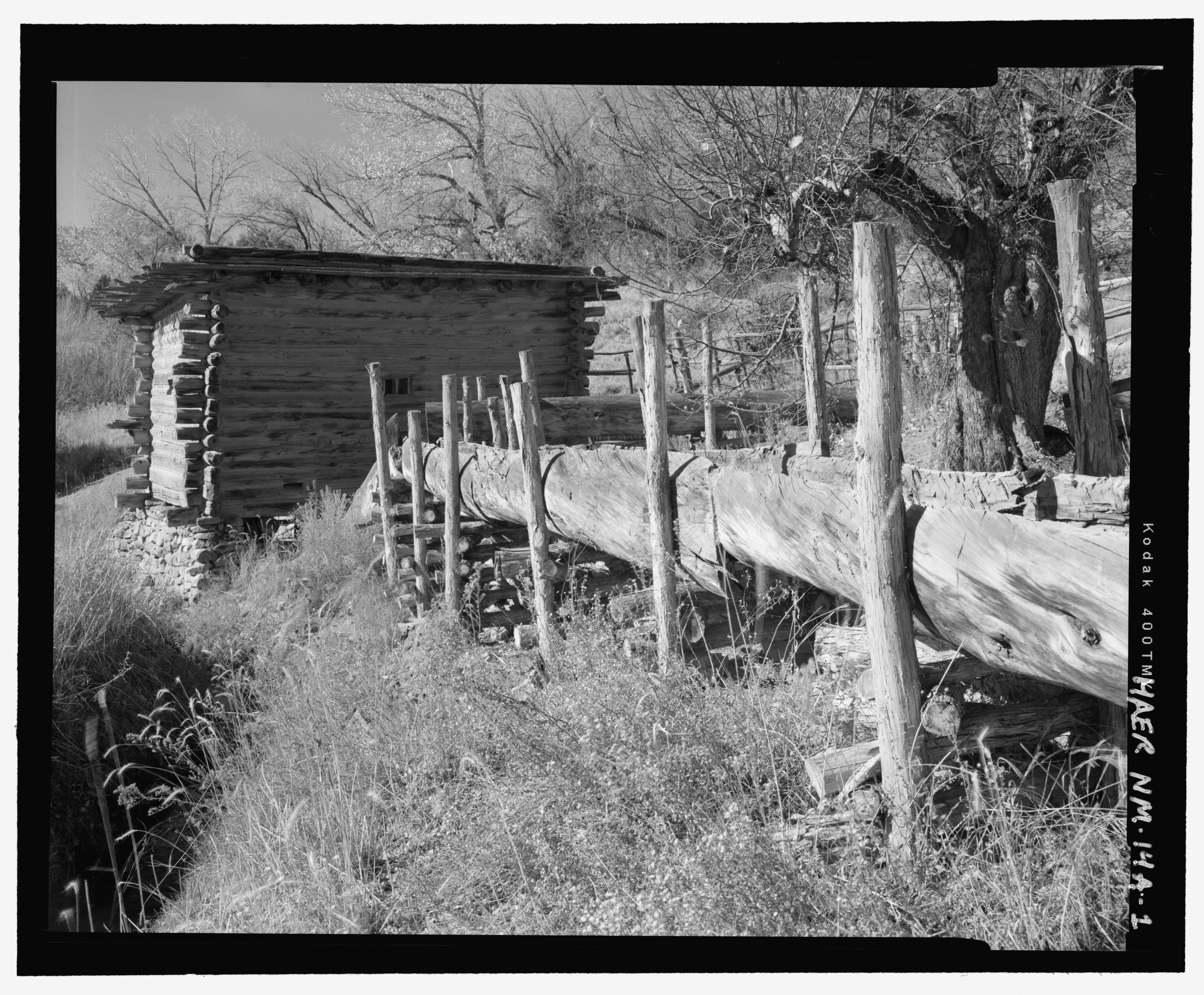
LA CANOA ELEVADA- Trough of hollowed log, elevated on log structure. - La Cienega Acequia, Truchas Molino, formerly adjacent to El Rancho de las Golondrinas
