= Donaciano Vigil House =

Historic house in New Mexico, United States

- U.S. National Register of Historic Places
- U.S. Historic district – Contributing property
- NM State Register of Cultural Properties
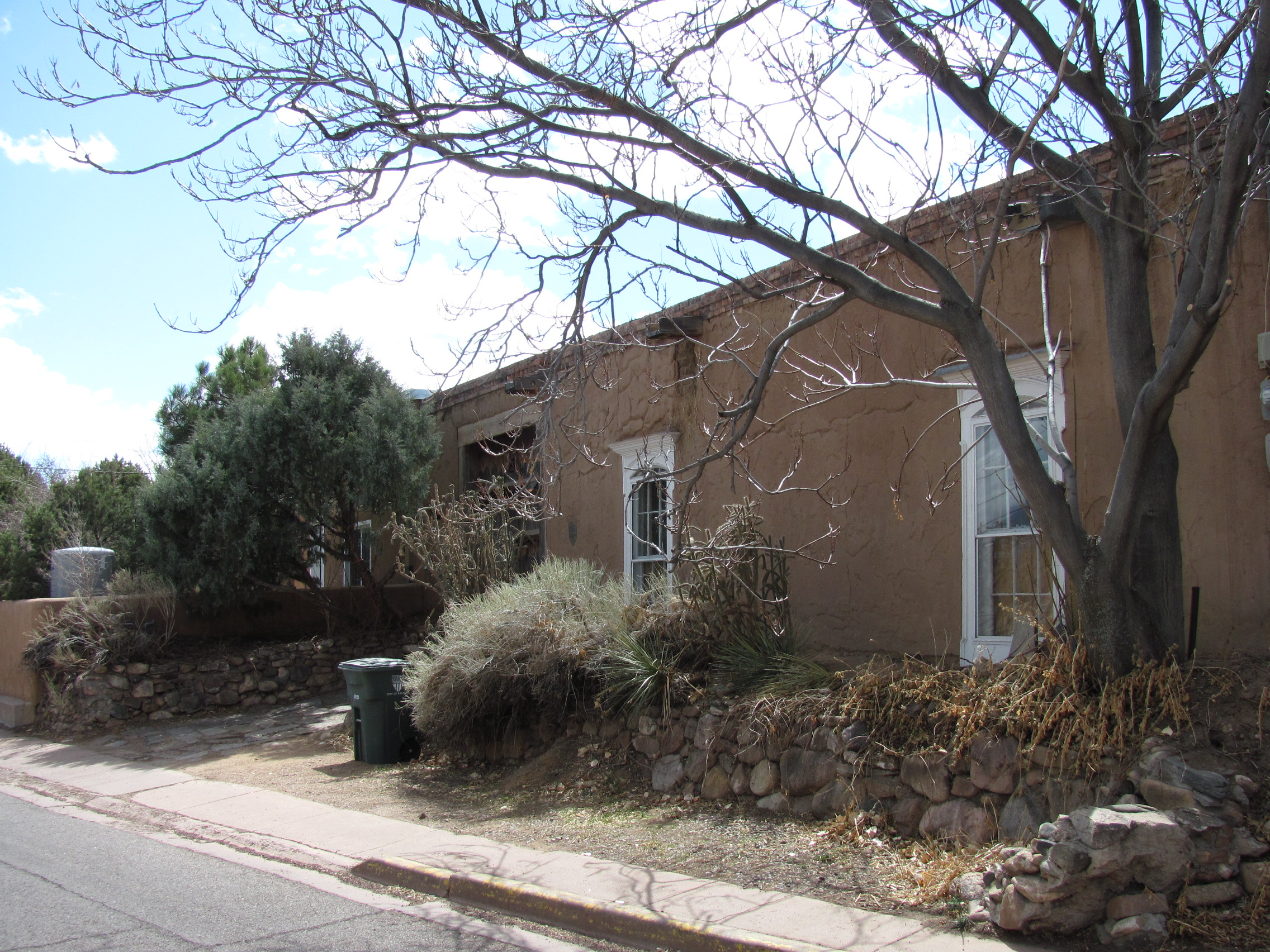
- Donaciano Vigil House

- Location within New Mexico Location within the United States
- Location: 518 Alto St., Santa Fe, New Mexico
- Coordinates: 35°41′16″N 105°56′45″W
- Area: 2 acres (0.81 ha)
- Built: 1832
- Part of: Santa Fe Historic District (ID73001150)
- NRHP reference No.: 72000811
- NMSRCP No.: 80

Significant dates
- Added to NRHP: June 28, 1972
- Designated CP: July 23, 1973
- Designated NMSRCP: May 23, 1969

The Donaciano Vigil House is an adobe house built in 1832 in Santa Fe, New Mexico. It was listed on the National Register of Historic Places in 1972. It was home of Donaciano Vigil, the first Hispanic governor of New Mexico under US rule.

It was a very active site of civil and political activity. Vigil lived in the property with his large family. The Donaciano Vigil House is a single-story adobe structure with a large interior patio. It is constructed in Territorial style. A restoration of the house began in 1959.

== See also ==
- National Register of Historic Places listings in Santa Fe County, New Mexico
