= Madrid Historic District =

Historic district in New Mexico, United States

- U.S. National Register of Historic Places
- U.S. Historic district
- NM State Register of Cultural Properties
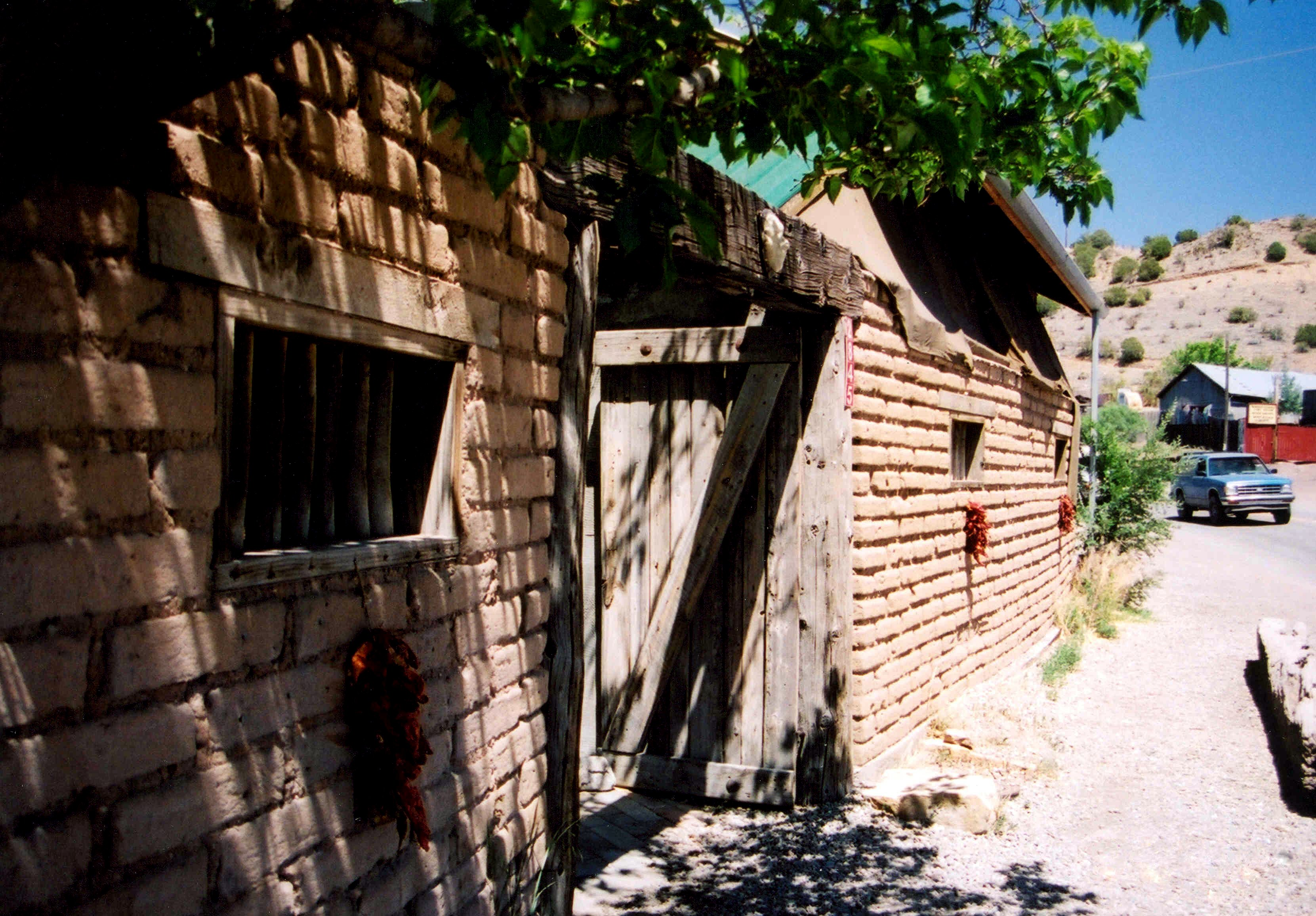
- an old adobe wall and gate at a house in Madrid, New Mexico

- Location within New Mexico Location within the United States
- Location: The historic district encompasses the core of Madrid, New Mexico along both sides of the valley, from north of the baseball field to the intersection of Arroyo Road and NM 14 at the southern edge of the town
- Coordinates: 35°24′21″N 106°9′16″W
- Area: 200 acres (80 ha)
- Built: 1892
- Architect: multiple
- Architectural style: wooden miners' houses, some adobe and stone buildings
- NRHP reference No.: 77000928
- NMSRCP No.: 356

Significant dates
- Added to NRHP: November 9, 1977
- Designated NMSRCP: December 6, 1974

The Madrid Historic District is a national historic district that designates the majority of the buildings in the 19th-century mining town of Madrid, New Mexico.

The district's nomination to the National Register of Historic Places was accompanied by photographs showing several contributing structures: the Roman Catholic church on Back Road; a former boarding house; a coal breaker; miners' houses on Opera House Road and Back Road; and company bungalows, other houses and the company headquarters on Main (Front) Street (now NM 14).

== See also ==
- National Register of Historic Places listings in Santa Fe County, New Mexico

== Sources ==
- "National Register of Historic Places Inventory — Nomination Form: Madrid Historic District". National Park Service. November 9, 1977.
- "Photographs Accompanying NRHP Nomination: Madrid Historic District". National Park Service. November 9, 1977.
- Emmer, Regina N. (2012), "Madrid Historic District", in Esperdy, Gabrielle; Kingsley, Karen (eds.), SAH Archipedia, Charlottesville: University of Virginia Press
