= Don Gaspar Historic District =

Historic district in New Mexico, United States

- U.S. National Register of Historic Places
- U.S. Historic district
- NM State Register of Cultural Properties
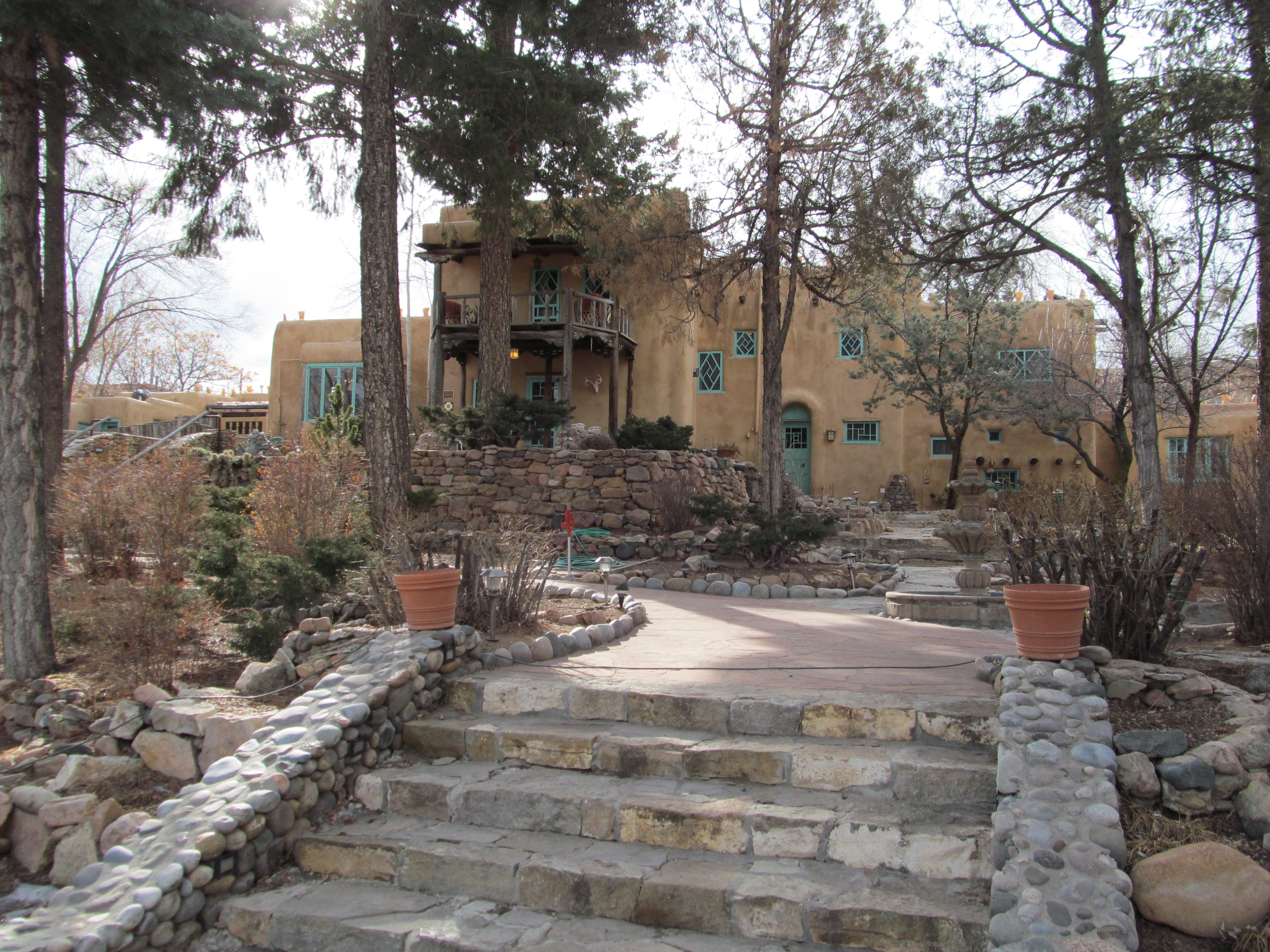
- Inn of the Turquoise Bear

- Location within New Mexico Location within the United States
- Location: Roughly bounded by Old Santa Fe Trail, Paseo de Peralta, Don Cubero and Houghton, Santa Fe, New Mexico
- Coordinates: 35°40′42″N 105°56′28″W
- Area: 103 acres (42 ha)
- Built: 1882
- Architect: Multiple
- Architectural style: Bungalow/Craftsman, Pueblo
- NRHP reference No.: 83001629
- NMSRCP No.: 891

Significant dates
- Added to NRHP: July 21, 1983
- Designated NMSRCP: December 1, 1982

The Don Gaspar Historic District is a historic district in Santa Fe, New Mexico. It was listed on the National Register of Historic Places in 1983. The listing included 278 contributing buildings.

== History ==
The district is primarily residential, and was largely built up in the early-20th century, although it was apparently subdivided in the late 19th century, and at least a few of the buildings date from this earlier period.

The historic district is named for Don Gaspar Ortiz y Alarid, who was a "merchant prince" who traveled on wagon trains between Santa Fe, New Mexico and Chihuahua, Mexico. He traveled later to Saint Louis, Missouri for trading. Ortiz y Alarid donated the property around the present location of Don Gaspar Avenue which forms the heart of the Don Gaspar Historic District. It is unclear how Ortiz y Alarid obtained possession of the land grant property.

== Architecture ==
The oldest houses are one-story adobe structures. The district expands south from the State Capitol, and is a segment of the Santa Fe South Capitol area. To the north it is bounded by Paseo de Peralta, and to the east, it is bounded by the Old Santa Fe Trail. The southern boundary is Houghton Street marks the southern boundary, and Don Cubero marks the western boundary.

The historic district includes a mixture of architectural styles such as Pueblo Revival, California Bungalow, and late-period Victorian homes. Some of the structures are partially constructed from structural tiles manufactured by the inmates of the New Mexico Penitentiary, known locally as "pen tile". The penitentiary was formerly located in the southwestern quadrant of the district. The area is transected by Don Gaspar Avenue and Galisteo Street, both of which run in a north–south direction.

== See also ==
- National Register of Historic Places listings in Santa Fe County, New Mexico
