= Randall Davey =

American painter (1887–1964)

- Born: 1887; East Orange, New Jersey, U.S.
- Died: November 1964 (aged 76–77); Baker, California, U.S.
- Education: Cornell University
- Occupations: Painter, art educator
- Employer: University of New Mexico

Randall Davey (1887 – 1964) was an American painter and art educator. He taught art at several institutions, including the University of New Mexico, and he had his studio in Santa Fe, New Mexico. His artwork can be seen in museums across the U.S.

== Early life and education ==
Davey was born East Orange, New Jersey on May 24, 1887. He graduated from Cornell University in 1909.

== Career ==
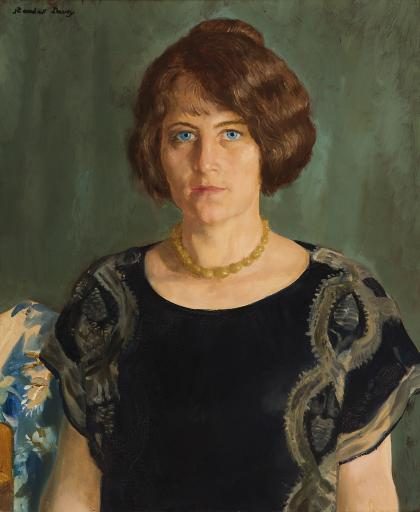
Portrait of Ruth Bohan by Randall Davey, c.1920

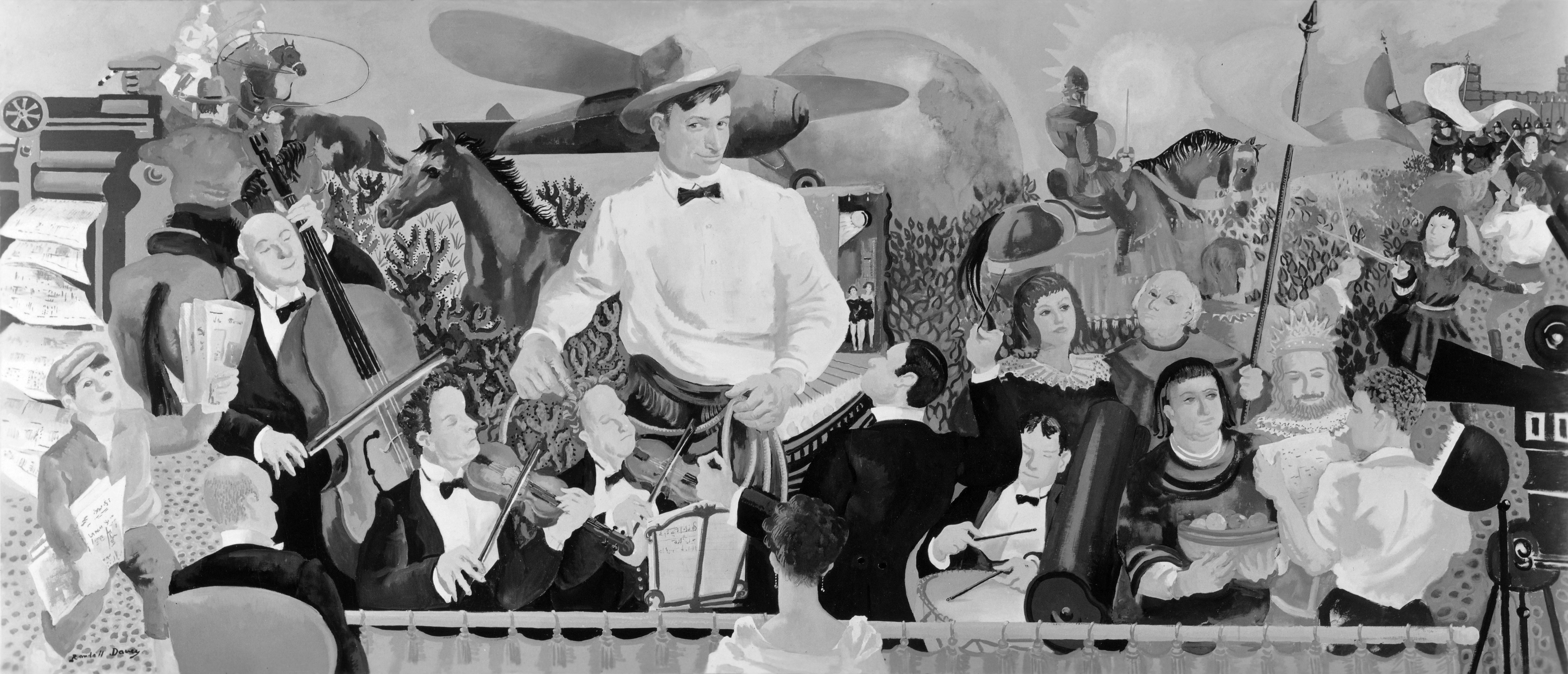
Will Rogers (1939), mural for the post office in Claremore, Oklahoma

Davey taught art at the School of the Art Institute of Chicago, the Kansas City Art Institute, and the Broadmoor Art Academy. He also taught at the University of New Mexico from 1945 to 1956. Davey moved to Santa Fe, New Mexico in 1919, where he established a studio at his Randall Davey House. He was primarily a portrait and equine painter, but he also painted landscapes and still lifes. His artwork was acquired by numerous national museums. It was exhibited at the Museum of Modern Art in 1933-1934. His work was also part of the painting event in the art competition at the 1932 Summer Olympics.

=== Collections ===
His work is held in the permanent collections of the Nelson-Atkins Museum of Art, Detroit Institute of Arts, the Whitney Museum of American Art, and the Corcoran Art Gallery, the National Portrait Gallery,

== Personal life ==
Davey had a son, William. He was predeceased by his wife. He died in a car accident near Baker, California in November 1964.

== Legacy ==
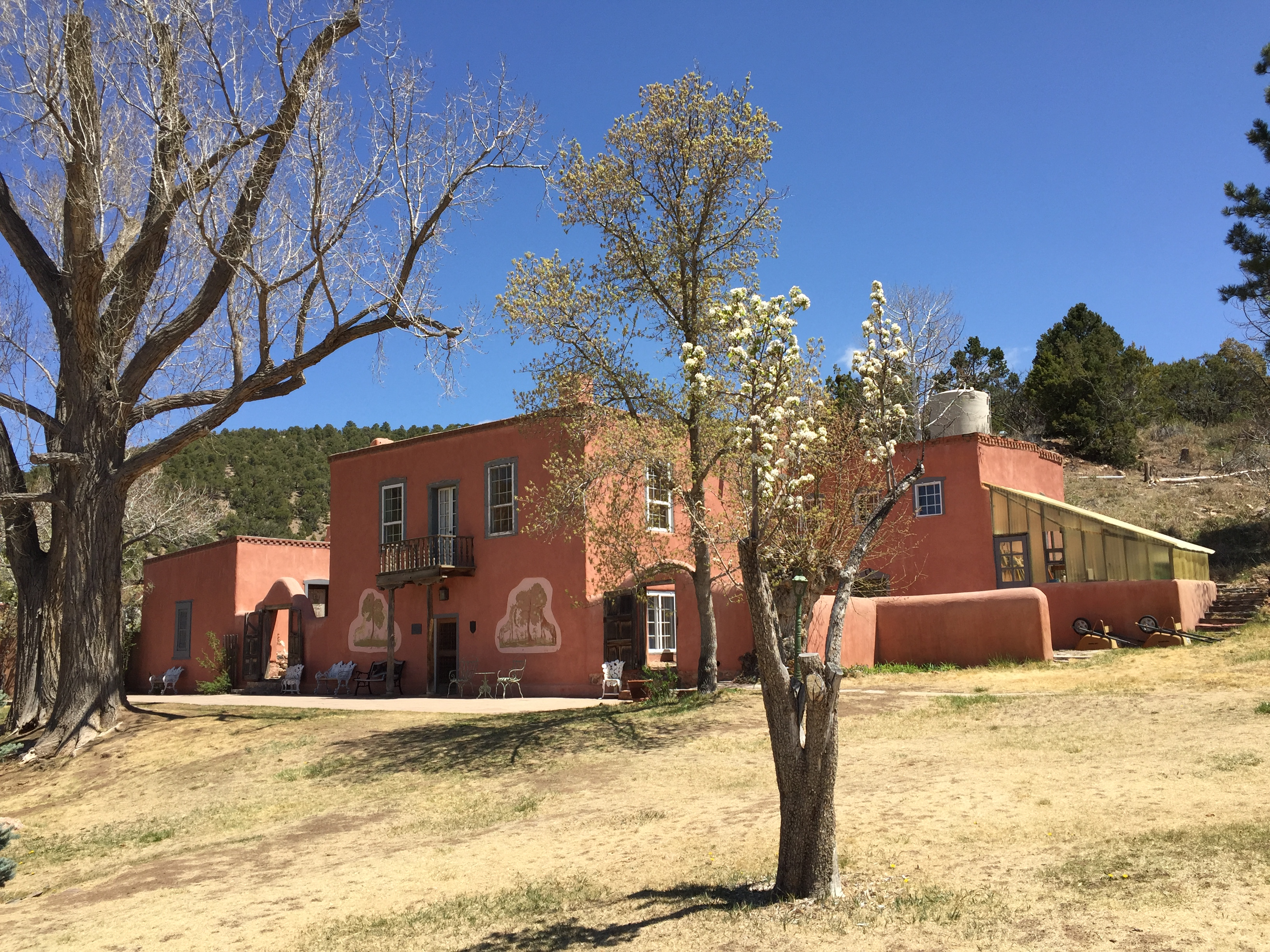
Randall Davey Audubon Center, Santa Fe

His historic house and art studio on upper Canyon Road in Santa Fe is on the National Register of Historic Places (NAID: 77847582). The property is now home to the Randall Davey Audubon Center and Sanctuary. In 1920, Davey purchased the home and property from the Martinez family; prior to that the structures housed a sawmill which was later turned into a gristmill. In 1983, Davey's heirs gifted the property to the Audubon Society which operates an educational center and oversees a wildlife sanctuary there.

An archive of his papers are held in the Archives of American Art at the Smithsonian Institution.
