= Nuestra Senora de Luz Church and Cemetery =

Historic church in New Mexico, United States

- U.S. National Register of Historic Places
- NM State Register of Cultural Properties
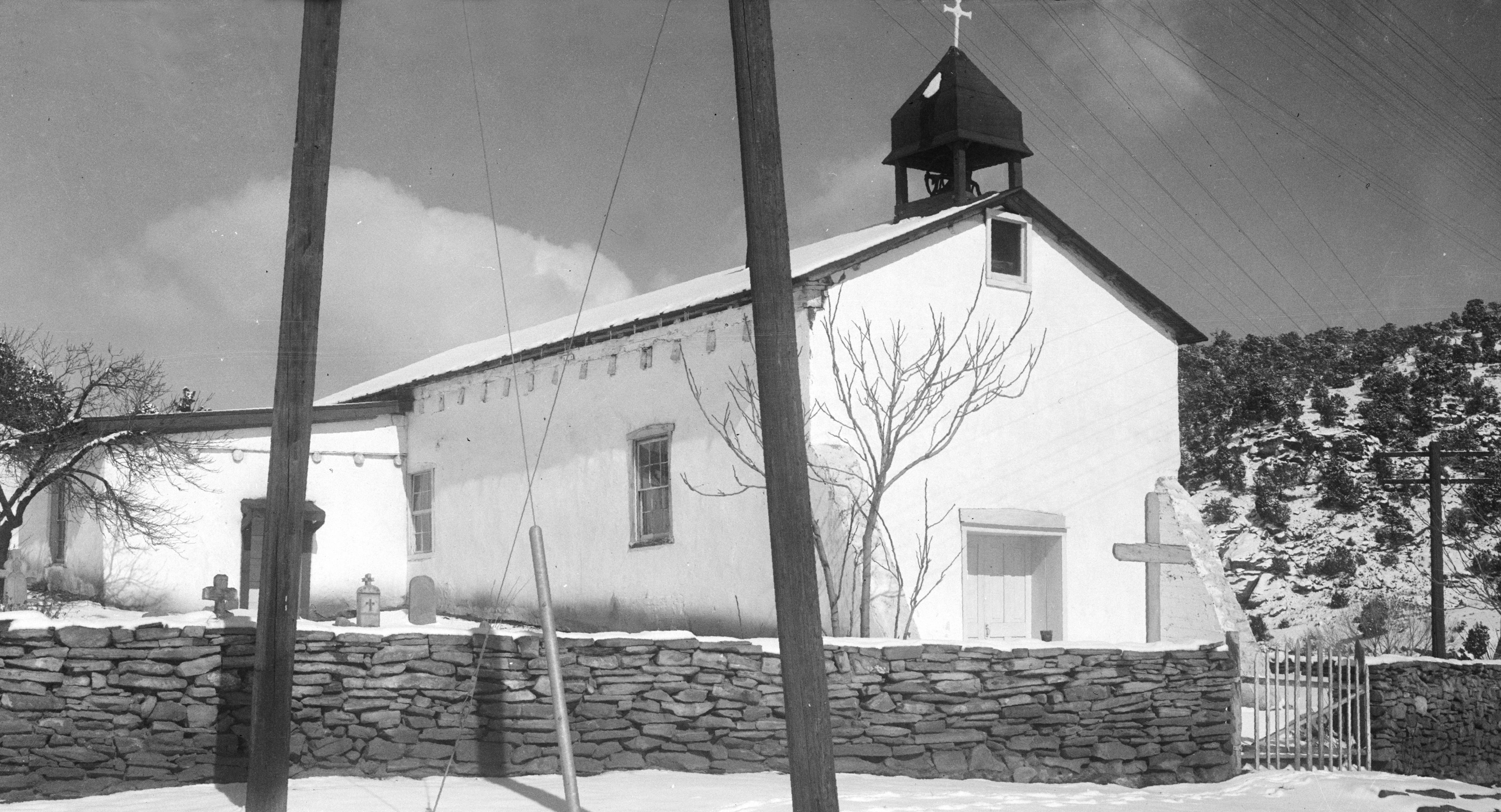

- Location within New Mexico Location within the United States
- Location: 13 mi. SE of Santa Fe, N of I-25 frontage rd., Canoncito, New Mexico
- Coordinates: 35°32′58″N 105°49′32″W
- Area: less than one acre
- Built: 1880
- Architectural style: Territorial
- MPS: Religious Properties of New Mexico MPS
- NRHP reference No.: 95001452
- NMSRCP No.: 1256

Significant dates
- Added to NRHP: December 14, 1995
- Designated NMSRCP: May 9, 1986

Nuestra Senora de Luz Church and Cemetery (Our Lady of Light Catholic Church; Canoncito Church) is a historic church building 13 miles southeast of Santa Fe, north of Interstate 25 frontage road in Canoncito, New Mexico. It was built in 1880 and added to the National Register of Historic Places in 1995.

It is a small, one-story, adobe chapel. It has also been known as Our Lady of Light Catholic Church and as Canoncito Church.

== See also ==
- National Register of Historic Places listings in Santa Fe County, New Mexico
