= Historic Santa Fe Foundation =

New Mexico nonprofit organization

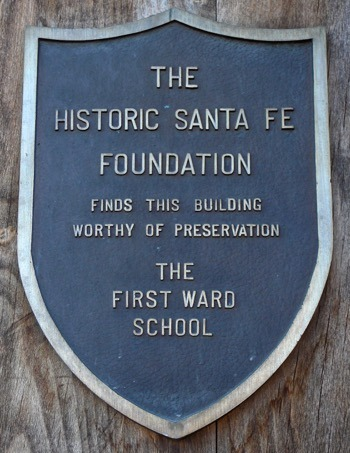
Many of the properties listed on the Foundation's Register of Resources Worthy of Preservation display this bronze plaque, as is shown here for the First Ward School.

The Historic Santa Fe Foundation, in Santa Fe, New Mexico, is a nonprofit organization for the preservation, protection, and promotion of the historic properties and diverse cultural items considered worthy of preservation. These properties are listed on the Foundation’s Register of Resources Worthy of Preservation and many display the Historic Santa Fe Foundation bronze plaque.

The Historic Santa Fe Foundation sponsors regular lectures, exhibits, workshops, events, and tours of historic properties. The Foundation also administers the Faith and John Gaw Meem Preservation Trades Internship, a 10-week program that permits a qualified student working in architecture, planning, design, or a similar field to gain hands-on experience in the theory and practice of preservation by working with foundation board members and staff. Each year, the Foundation recognizes contributions to historic preservation by local residents, businesses, and building trades professionals through its Architectural Stewardship Award. In addition, the Foundation has an artist-in-residence program focusing on the heritage of the Santa Fe area. As of 2018, the Foundation maintains preservation easements on nine properties and maintains a register of 95 homes, buildings, structures, and places that are considered worthy of preservation.

== History ==
The Old Santa Fe Association, an advocacy organization for improved preservation policies, sponsored the formation of the Historic Santa Fe Foundation in 1961. The inaugural members consisted of Santa Fe artists, writers, doctors, business owners, and neighbors. John Gaw Meem, a New Mexico architect, was elected the First Honorary Director of the Board of Directors. The catalyst for this new preservation organization was the City of Santa Fe’s proposal to demolish the historic Simon Nusbaum House in 1960. With the help of John Gaw Meem, $20,000 was raised to try to purchase the building. Although the Nusbaum house was replaced with an 85-car parking lot, the money that had been raised to protect it was used to begin the Foundation.

== Protection ==
The Historic Santa Fe Foundation's preservation easement program seeks to permanently protect historic buildings and sites. The easement is a voluntary form of legal agreement between the Foundation and the property owner that describes the preservation objective of the easement and the property owner’s rights and obligations to follow those restrictions when making alterations to the property. The easement agreement remains in force when the property changes ownership, thus protecting the property well into the future

The Historic Santa Fe Foundation endeavors to protect Santa Fe’s historic architectural and cultural integrity through scholarly research and documentation. HSFF archives include property files (narrative histories, newspaper articles, correspondence, etc.), photographs, and documentation relating to early and current preservation efforts. In addition to maintaining archives, the Foundation staff offers advice to those researching Santa Fe’s historic properties.

== Publications ==
The Historic Santa Fe Foundation produces a tri-annual newsletter of essays, book reviews, and historical site descriptions. It also publishes a monthly e-zine, and occasional books, including Old Santa Fe Today

== Archives ==
The Historic Santa Fe Foundation has archives on about 100 historic properties in the Santa Fe region. The archives have historical information on ownership, architectural modifications, and more. Most properties are now in an electronic database and the electronic cataloging of files continues.

== The Faith and John Gaw Meem Preservation Trades Internship ==
The Faith and John Gaw Meem Preservation Trades Internship, established in 2005, provides emerging students of preservation with an opportunity to engage in hands-on conservation of historic adobe buildings, working under the mentorship of Foundation Board members and staff. The 10-week summer program houses the intern, reimburses the intern at the rate of Santa Fe's Living Wage, and allows the intern to participate in all Foundation activities.

== Training and education ==
Much of the preservation work performed by the Foundation is presented in workshops on the use of traditional techniques and material, open to the public. These workshops help to train new generations of preservation craftspeople as well as providing stewardship information for owners of other historic properties. Past workshops have covered tree ring dating (a useful tool in dating structures), earthen plasters, natural lime finishes, historic window restoration and maintenance of historic gardens.

The monthly Salon El Zaguan lectures offer speakers on diverse topics of interest to Foundation members and the public.

== Architectural Stewardship Award ==
Each year, during America's National Preservation Month, the Foundation presents an Architectural Stewardship Award to an individual or organization that has demonstrated outstanding dedication to the care and preservation of one or more of Santa Fe's prominent historic buildings. In recent years, the award has gone to the Scottish Rite Masonic Center (1911–12); La Fonda Hotel on the Plaza (1920); the Friends (Quaker) Meeting House (circa 1920), former studio of Olive Rush; the Gustave Baumann House (1923); and the San Miguel Chapel (built prior to 1628). The purpose of the award is to recognize outstanding stewardship and to encourage similar practices among owners of historic properties. The award is presented at Santa Fe's annual Heritage Preservation Awards ceremony, co-sponsored by the City's Historic Preservation Division, The Old Santa Fe Association, and the Historic Santa Fe Foundation.

== Offices ==
Historic Santa Fe Foundation offices are in El Zaguan, the historic James L. Johnson home, built in the mid-1800s. In 1928, the home was purchased by Magretta Dietrich, a leading suffragette, to protect it from redevelopment. It has a garden, white picket fence, and traditional architecture on the arts and crafts avenue of Canyon Road. In addition to residential apartments, El Zaguan is also home to rotating art exhibits.

The Historic Santa Fe Foundation is a 501(c)(3) organization governed by a Board of Directors, with a staff that includes an executive director, administrative assistant, development director, and two restoration specialists.

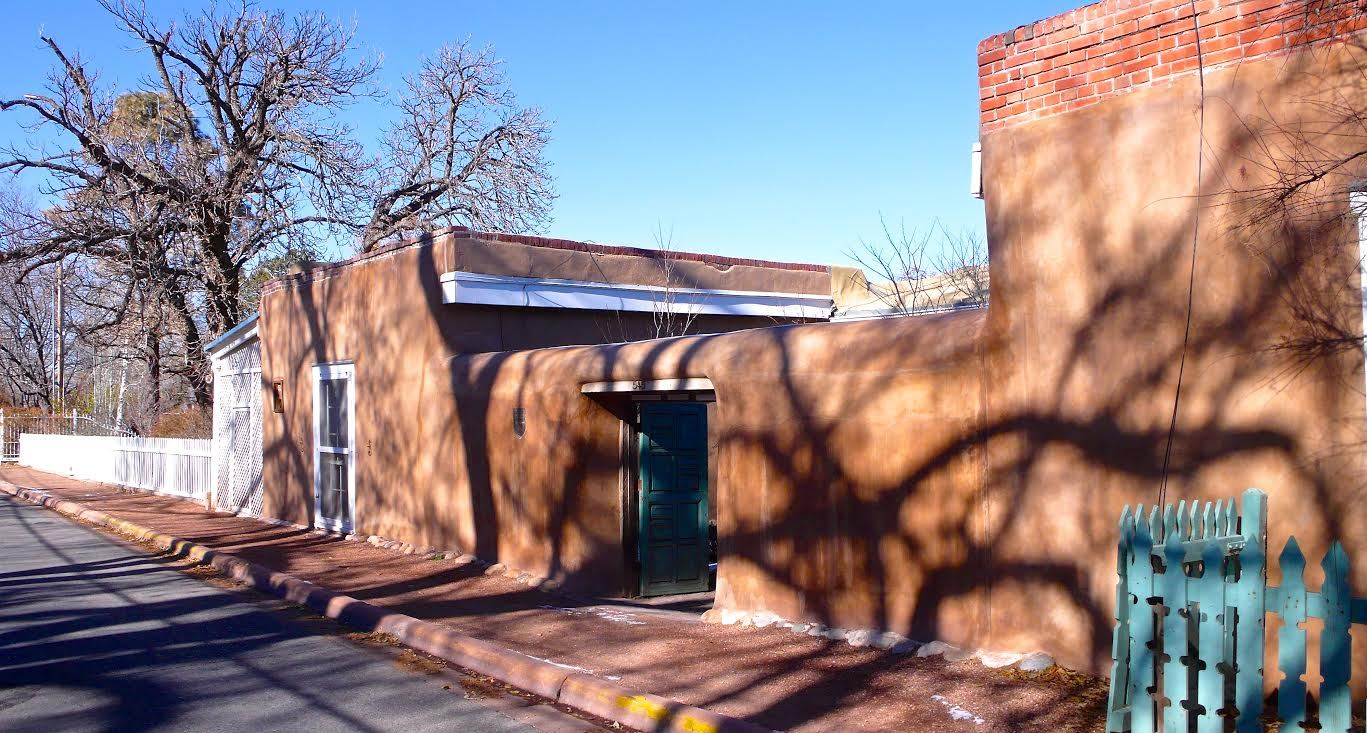
Offices in El Zaguan, Santa Fe

== The Garden at El Zaguan ==
The well-known Garden at El Zaguan is a planted space along Canyon Road, maintained in partnership with Santa Fe Master Gardeners. The garden has flowers in bloom throughout the warmer months and is open to the public.
