= Alfred M. Bergere House =

- U.S. National Register of Historic Places
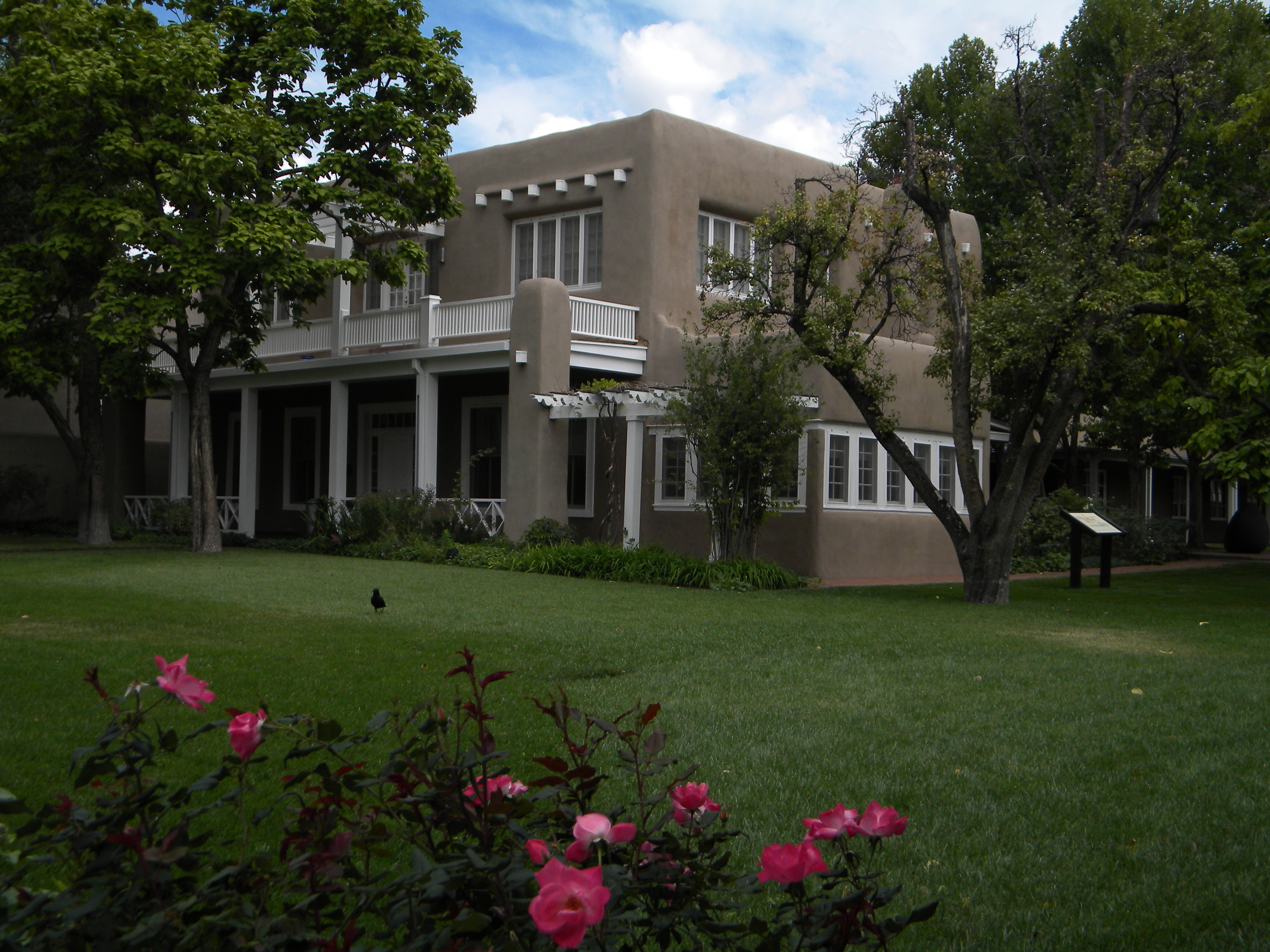

- Location within New Mexico
- Location: 135 Grant Ave., Santa Fe, New Mexico
- Coordinates: 35°41′21″N 105°56′22″W
- Area: 0.8 acres (0.32 ha)
- Built: c.1873
- Built by: U.S. Army
- Architectural style: Pueblo
- NRHP reference No.: 75001166
- Added to NRHP: October 1, 1975

The Alfred M. Bergere House, at 135 Grant Ave. in Santa Fe, New Mexico, was built in the 1870s. It was listed on the National Register of Historic Places in 1975.

It has been in the Pueblo Revival style since a makeover in 1926.

It was built as am L-shaped adobe building. The house quartered General and former President U.S. Grant, Mrs. Grant, and Mrs. Fred Grant during their visit to the area in 1880.

It is significant as "one of two surviving Fort Marcy Military Reservation officer's residences in addition to being the home of a politically and socially prominent New Mexico family".
