= Margretta Dietrich =

American suffragist

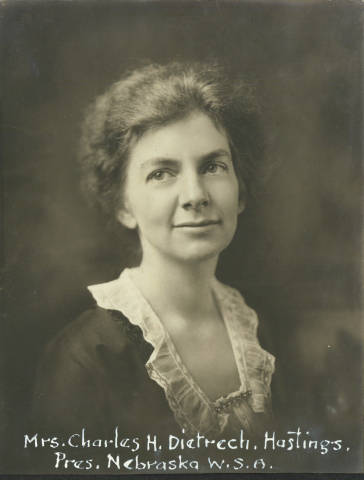
- Born: Margaretta Stewart (Note: There are some sources that state that she is Margretta Stewart Shaw, but she was Margaretta and Margretta Stewart in public records, newspapers, and other sources.); 1881; Philadelphia, Pennsylvania
- Died: January 13, 1961 (aged 79–80)
- Education: Bryn Mawr College
- Occupations: Suffragist, Activist
- Spouse: Charles Henry Dietrich (m. 1909; died in 1924)

Margretta Dietrich was an American suffragette and activist. She served as resident of the Nebraska Woman's Suffrage Association in 1919 and Chairman of the Nebraska State League of Women Voters in 1920. Following the ratification of the 19th amendment, she went on to advocate for the rights of Indigenous Americans in New Mexico. She was the president of the New Mexico Association of Indians Affairs for more than 20 years and helped found and was the trustee for several organizations that advocated for Native Americans.

== Personal life ==
Born Margaretta Stewart in November 1881 in Philadelphia to Dr. William Shaw Stewart and Delia Stewart. Her sisters were Mabel, Delia, and Dorothy Stewart. Her parents sent her and her sister to private school in Philadelphia.

Margretta achieved her Bachelors of Arts Degree from Bryn Mawr College in Philadelphia in 1903. Gertrude Dietrich, the daughter of Charles Henry Dietrich, also attended Bryn Mawr.

She became the second wife of Charles Henry Dietrich former Governor of Nebraska. They were married on October 27, 1909 in Philadelphia, Pennsylvania at the home of her mother, the widow of Dr. William Shaw Stewart. They lived in Hastings, Nebraska. He died on April 10, 1924. Dietrich died on January 13, 1961. Her home in Santa Fe, El Zaguan, is listed on the National Register of Historic Places.

== Suffrage ==
Dietrich was elected President of the Nebraska Woman's Suffrage Association in 1919 and became Chairman of the Nebraska State League of Women Voters in 1920. She reported in the November 1920 Alumnae Quarterly that she "was one of the Suffrage Emergency Corps to visit Connecticut in May," alluding to the unsuccessful campaign to get the state to ratify the 19th Amendment. Dietrich served as President of Nebraska Women's Suffrage Association from 1918 - 1920. She was also President and regional Director of Nebraska and National League of Women Voters 1920 - 1929.

== Restoration and preservation ==
Dietrich moved to Santa Fe, New Mexico in 1927 with her sister, Dorothy Stewart, an artist, and in 1928 bought the Juan Jose Prada House on Canyon Road, which had been restored by Kate Chapman.

She restored historic buildings, including the Rafael Borrego House, for which she received the Cyrus McCormick Prize for the excellence of restoration. It became Geronimo's Restaurant. She also restored the 24-room adobe hacienda of James L. Johnson, a trader on the Santa Fe Trail, called El Zaguán house. Dietrich purchased the hacienda in 1927, saving it from demolition for an apartment building. Chapman restored and enlarged the house, including the addition of three cottages. The Stewart sisters used El Zaguán as an art gallery, hotel, and girls' school. It is now owned by the Historic Santa Fe Foundation, who rents out apartments to artists and writers. Dietrich preserved a number of historic homes on Canyon Road in Santa Fe.

== Advocacy and indigenous rights ==
Dietrich continued her advocacy work in New Mexico for the Puebloan and Navajo people by lobbying against development of dams and exploration in villages. She was president of the New Mexico Association of Indians Affairs from 1932 until 1953 and member of the Indian Arts Fund. She raised funds for the New Mexico Association of Indians Affairs and developed programs to help Native Americans in the state. The association sponsored the Santa Fe Indian Club during World War II. Dietrich produced a newsletter to inform troops about their fellow New Mexican soldiers and what was happening on the home front, sent packages to the soldiers for Christmas, and generally sought to improve morale and support the Native American troops from New Mexico.

Through careful study she [Margretta Dietrich] has made herself familiar with Pueblo and Navajo Indians and their interests and problems. Her judgment could always be relied upon. She was always alert and active in promoting the good of all the Indian people, and particularly of the Southwest Indians whom she knew so well.

— Lawrence E. Lindley, General Secretary, The Indian Rights Association, Philadelphia

She helped form the Indian Arts Fund and the Spanish Colonial Arts Society. She served as a trustee for the Laboratory of Anthropology (now the Museum of Indian Arts and Culture) and the School of American Research (now the School for Advanced Research). She amassed 234 Native American paintings by 104 artists and representing 15 tribal divisions. Her collection was shown at the National Gallery of Art in Washington, D.C., the Museum of Modern Art in New York City, and other museums and galleries. Most of her collection is of Navajo, Apache and Puebloan tribes of Arizona and New Mexico. She was a patron for Native American art students of Dorothy Dunn (at the Santa Fe Indian School). Dunn was the curator of Dietrich's collection. After her death, much of her collection went to Dunn, the State Library, and the Museum of New Mexico.

Of a proposed dam site on Native American lands, she wrote:

You also know that if these dams are constructed they will destroy several ancient Indian villages and flood their fertile lands which the ancestors of these present Indians were cultivating and irrigating even before the Spaniards came into this region in 1540... We believe it is your duty to inform the Congress that even to drill on Pueblo land may be desecration to their sacred areas and could destroy an important part of the only indigenous culture in the United States.

— Margretta Dietrich, An Open Letter to Hon. John Collier, US Commissioner of Indian Affairs Re: H.R. 323.

== Publications ==
Dietrich published three books in her lifetime and one was published posthumously.

- Nebraska Recollections, self-published Vegara Printing Company, 1957
- The Dorothy Newkirk Stewart Memorial Collection, Museum of New Mexico Library, Santa Fe, New Mexico, 1957
- New Mexico Recollections Part I, self- published Vegara Printing Company, 1959
- New Mexico Recollections Part II, Vegara Printing Company, Santa Fe NM, 1961, Editor Sylvia Loomis
