= Cañoncito, Santa Fe County, New Mexico =

Unincorporated community in Santa Fe County, New Mexico, United States

Cañoncito, New Mexico
- Unincorporated community
- Location within New Mexico
- Coordinates: 35°32′45″N 105°51′28″W
- Country: United States
- State: New Mexico
- County: Santa Fe
- Elevation: 6,893 ft (2,101 m)
- Time zone: UTC-7 (Mountain (MST))
  - Summer (DST): UTC-6 (MDT)
- Area code: 505
- GNIS feature ID: 2806757

Cañoncito is an unincorporated community in Santa Fe County, New Mexico, United States. Cañoncito is located on Interstate 25, 11.5 miles (18.5 km) southeast of Santa Fe. Nuestra Señora de Luz Church and Cemetery, which is listed on the National Register of Historic Places, is located in Cañoncito.

== Education ==
It is within Santa Fe Public Schools.

It is zoned to El Dorado Community School (K-8) in El Dorado. Its high school is Santa Fe High School.
