= Digneo-Valdes House =

Historic house in New Mexico, United States

- U.S. National Register of Historic Places
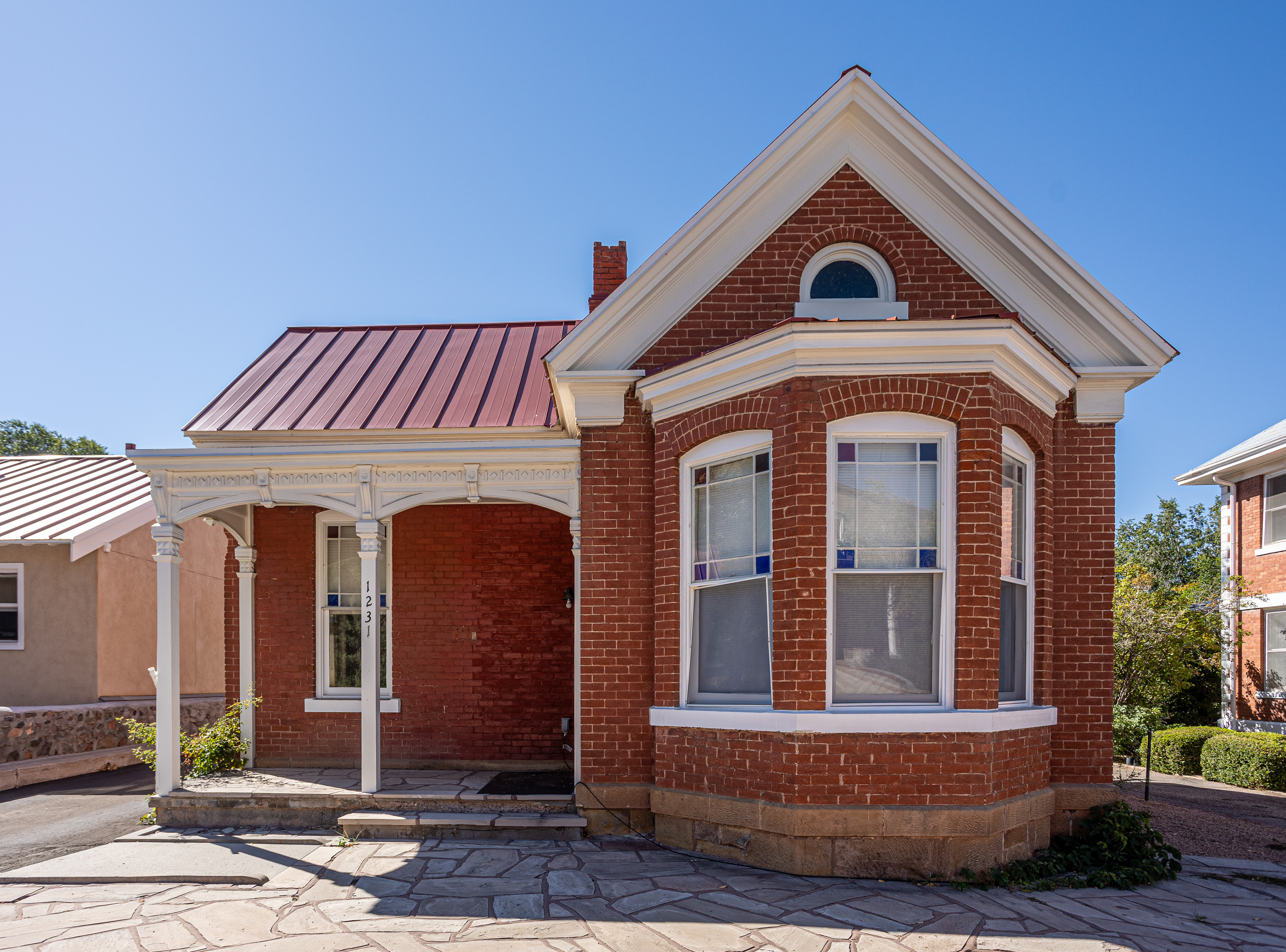

- Location within New Mexico Location within the United States
- Location: 1231 Paseo de Peralta, Santa Fe, New Mexico
- Coordinates: 35.681336°N 105.939728°W
- Area: 0.3 acres (0.12 ha)
- Built: 1889
- Built by: Carl Digneo
- NRHP reference No.: 78001827
- Added to NRHP: November 21, 1978

The Digneo-Valdez House, at 1231 Paseo de Peralta in Santa Fe, New Mexico, was built in 1939. It was listed on the National Register of Historic Places in 1978.

It is a one-and-half-story brick house constructed by Italian immigrant and building contractor Carl Digneo.
