= New Mexico School for the Deaf =

State-run school in New Mexico, U.S.

Coordinates: 35.6769°N 105.9563°W

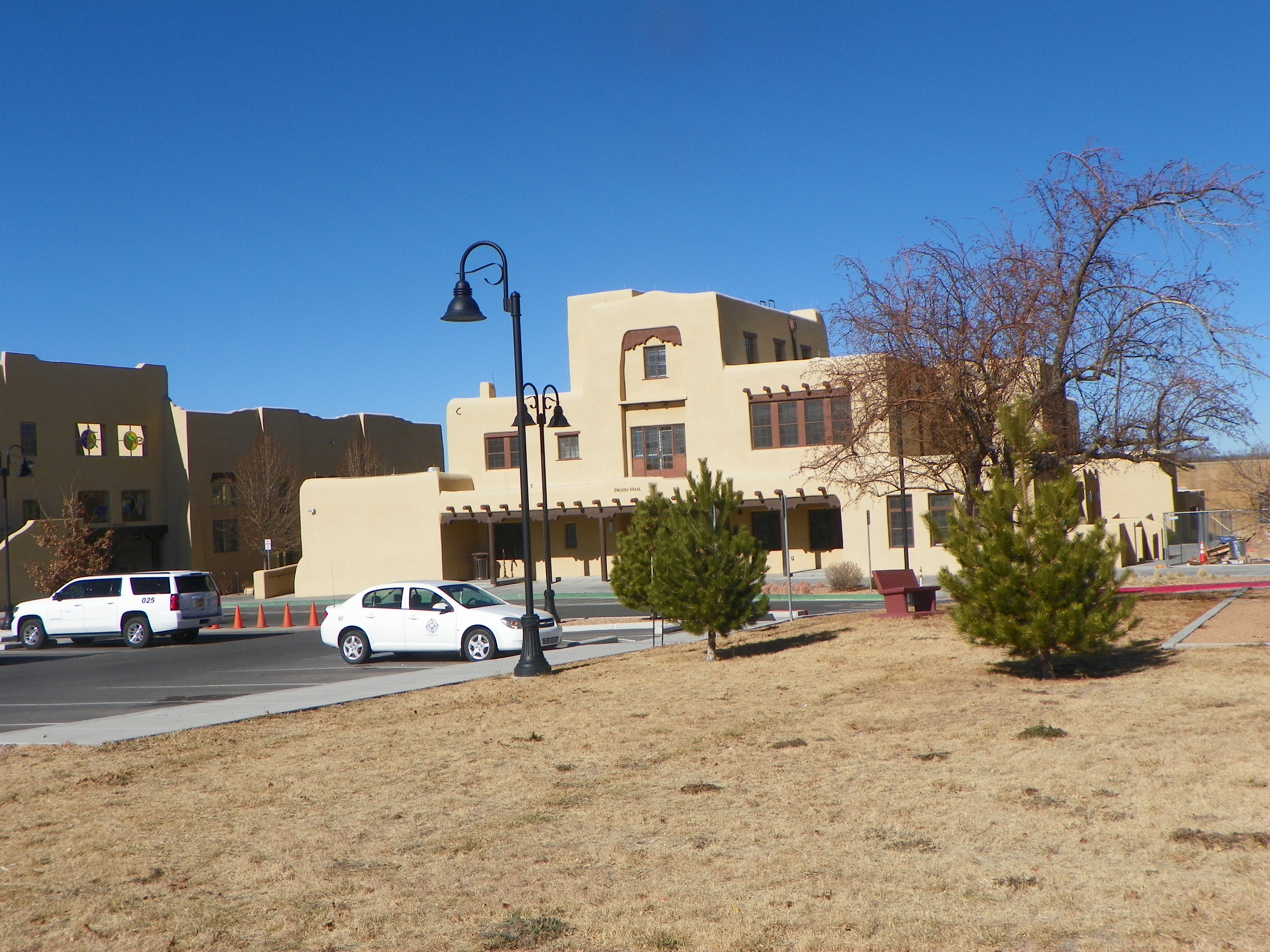

Information
- Established: 1885

The New Mexico School for the Deaf (NMSD; Spanish: Escuela para Sordos de Nuevo México) is a state-run school in Santa Fe, New Mexico, providing education for deaf and hard-of-hearing students from preschool through grade 12. Established in 1885 by the New Mexico legislature, it is the only land-grant school for the deaf in the United States.

== Facilities ==
Several of NMSD's buildings are historical landmarks designed in the Santa Fe Pueblo architectural style. The campus includes Dillon Hall, Hester Hall, Connor Hall, Cartwright Hall, Delgado Hall, Belle & Cora Larson Dining Hall, Lars M. Larson Residential Complex & Activity Center, James A. Little Theater, Library & Museum and the Superintendent's Residence.

It has a boarding facility with a capacity of 96 students.

It has preschool facilities in Albuquerque, Farmington, and Las Cruces.
