= Randall Davey House =

1847 building in Santa Fe, New Mexico

- U.S. National Register of Historic Places
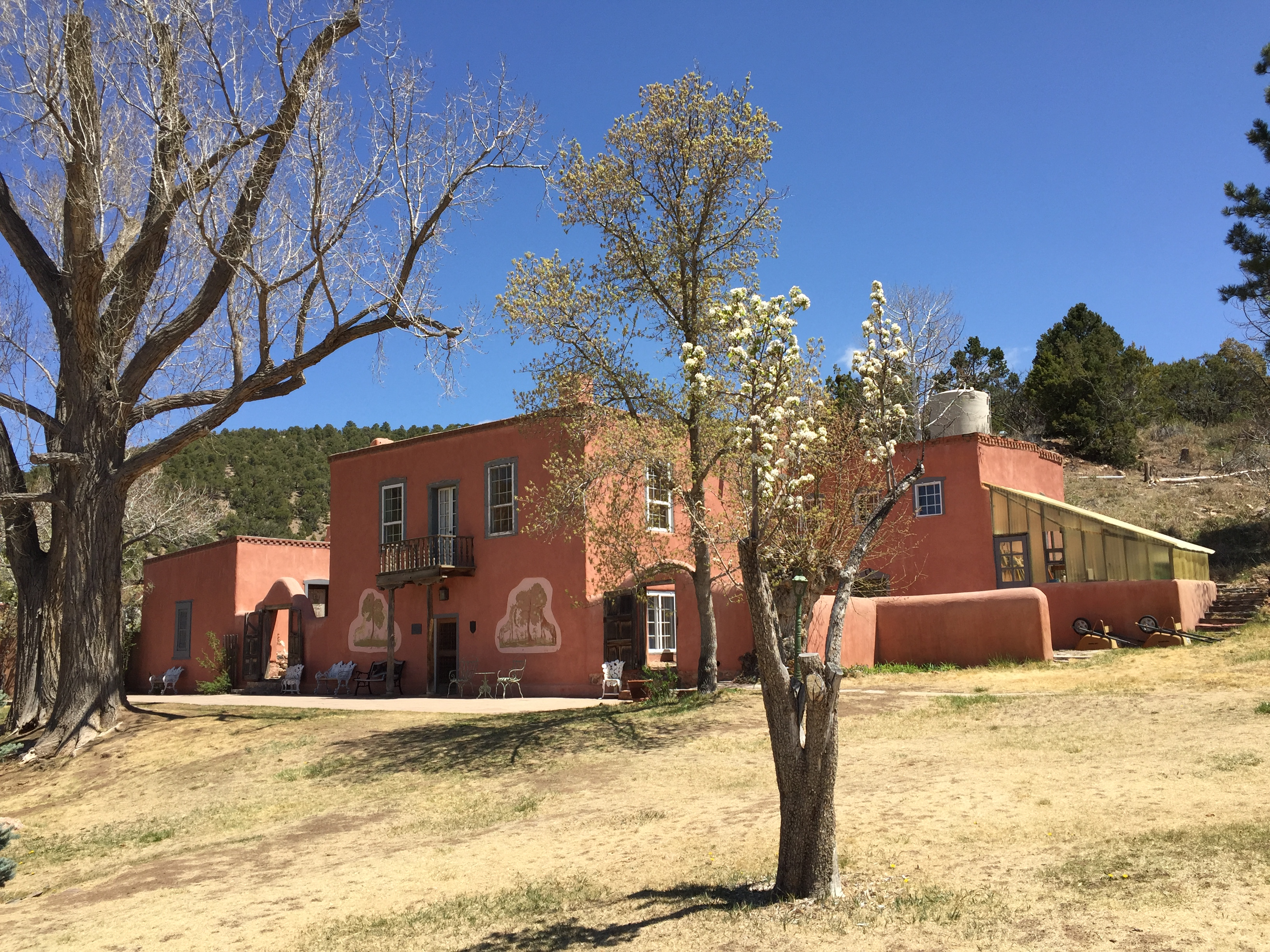

- Location within New Mexico
- Location: Upper Canyon Road, Santa Fe, New Mexico
- Coordinates: 35°41′23″N 105°53′17″W
- Area: 0.5 acres (0.20 ha)
- Built: 1847
- NRHP reference No.: 70000409
- Added to NRHP: July 9, 1970

The Randall Davey House is a historic building on Upper Canyon Road in Santa Fe, New Mexico, United States. It was built in 1847. It was listed on the National Register of Historic Places in 1970. The listing included two contributing buildings. It was a home of artist Randall Davey, and is now part of the Randall Davey Audubon Center & Sanctuary.

== History ==
=== Sawmill ===
It was built as a sawmill, the first in the New Mexico territory, "by the United States Army Quartermaster in order to provide lumber needed for the construction of nearby Fort Marcy. The sawmill was powered by water from the Santa Fe River.

A mortgage on the property was owned by Colonel Ceran St. Vrain, trapper and trader from St. Louis, who eventually obtained the property for $500 at a public auction in 1852.

The property at that time, according to contemporary legal documents, consisted of 'one gristmill, one circular sawmill with extra gearing; the building for said sawmill is a good two story building, built for that purpose. Also two dwelling houses and one stable.'

=== Davey house ===
Randall Davey, his wife Isabel and infant daughter Kate are buried nearby. Two murals on the main building were painted by Davey.
