= Ricardo Alarid House =

Historic house in New Mexico, United States

- U.S. National Register of Historic Places
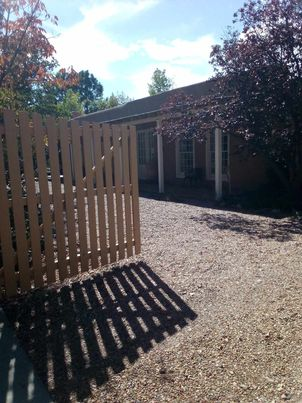

- Location within New Mexico Location within the United States
- Location: 534 Alarid St., Santa Fe, New Mexico
- Coordinates: 35°40′56″N 105°57′07″W
- Area: less than one acre
- Built: 1902
- NRHP reference No.: 84003054
- Added to NRHP: August 30, 1984

The Ricardo Alarid House, at 534 Alarid St. in Santa Fe, New Mexico, was built in 1902. It was listed on the National Register of Historic Places in 1984.

It has priorly been used as the campus of Alvord Elementary Magnet School and Tierra Encantada Charter High School. It has several murals on the exterior walls.
