= Santa Fe Historic District =

Historic district in New Mexico, United States

- U.S. National Register of Historic Places
- U.S. Historic district
- NM State Register of Cultural Properties
- Location within New Mexico Location within the United States
- Location: Roughly bounded by Camino Cabra, Camino de las Animas, W. Manhattan Ave., S. St. Francis Dr., and Griffin St., Santa Fe, New Mexico
- Coordinates: 35°41′13″N 105°56′6″W
- Area: 1,113 acres (450 ha)
- Architectural style: Spanish-Pueblo, Territorial
- NRHP reference No.: 73001150
- NMSRCP No.: 260

Significant dates
- Added to NRHP: July 23, 1973
- Designated NMSRCP: September 29, 1972

Santa Fe Historic District is a historic district in Santa Fe, New Mexico that was listed on the National Register of Historic Places in 1973. It includes two sites that are individually named U.S. National Historic Landmarks:

- Santa Fe Plaza
- Palace of the Governors

In addition, it includes:

- Donaciano Vigil House, a separately-listed Registered Historic Place

The district boundaries were later amended, and now wholly includes the Gross, Kelly, and Company Warehouse, built in 1913, which was an early work of a creator of the Spanish Pueblo Revival style, Isaac Hamilton Rapp.

== See also ==
- National Register of Historic Places listings in Santa Fe County, New Mexico
