= National Register of Historic Places listings in McKinley County, New Mexico =

Location of McKinley County in New Mexico

This is a list of the National Register of Historic Places listings in McKinley County, New Mexico.

This is intended to be a complete list of the properties and districts on the National Register of Historic Places in McKinley County, New Mexico, United States. Latitude and longitude coordinates are provided for many National Register properties and districts; these locations may be seen together in a map.

There are 77 properties and districts listed on the National Register in the county, including 2 National Historic Landmarks. Another two properties were once listed, but have since been removed. All of the places within the county currently or formerly on the National Register are also recorded on the State Register of Cultural Properties.

This National Park Service list is complete through NPS recent listings posted May 1, 2026.

Contents: NRHP in New Mexico by county
Bernalillo – Catron – Chaves – Cibola – Colfax – Curry – De Baca – Doña Ana – Eddy – Grant – Guadalupe – Harding – Hidalgo – Lea – Lincoln – Los Alamos – Luna – McKinley – Mora – Otero – Quay – Rio Arriba – Roosevelt – San Juan – San Miguel – Sandoval – Santa Fe – Sierra – Socorro – Taos – Torrance – Union – Valencia

== Current listings ==
	Name on the Register	Image	Date listed	Location	City or town	Description
1	Andrews Archeological District	Andrews Archeological District	May 17, 1979 (#79003129)	Address Restricted	Prewitt	
2	Archeological Site LA 15278 (Reservoir Site; CM 100)	Archeological Site LA 15278 (Reservoir Site; CM 100)	August 2, 1985 (#85001700)	Address Restricted	Pueblo Pintado	
3	Archeological Site LA 45,780	Archeological Site LA 45,780	August 2, 1985 (#85001701)	Address Restricted	Pueblo Pintado	
4	Archeological Site LA 45,781	Archeological Site LA 45,781	August 2, 1985 (#85001702)	Address Restricted	Pueblo Pintado	
5	Archeological Site LA 45,782	Archeological Site LA 45,782	August 2, 1985 (#85001703)	Address Restricted	Pueblo Pintado	
6	Archeological Site LA 45,784	Archeological Site LA 45,784	August 2, 1985 (#85001704)	Address Restricted	Pueblo Pintado	
7	Archeological Site LA 45,785	Archeological Site LA 45,785	August 2, 1985 (#85001705)	Address Restricted	Pueblo Pintado	
8	Archeological Site LA 45,786	Archeological Site LA 45,786	August 2, 1985 (#85001706)	Address Restricted	Pueblo Pintado	
9	Archeological Site LA 45,789	Archeological Site LA 45,789	August 2, 1985 (#85001707)	Address Restricted	Pueblo Pintado	
10	Archeological Site LA 50,000	Archeological Site LA 50,000	August 2, 1985 (#85001708)	Address Restricted	Pueblo Pintado	
11	Archeological Site LA 50,001	Archeological Site LA 50,001	August 2, 1985 (#85001709)	Address Restricted	Pueblo Pintado	
12	Archeological Site LA 50,013 (CM101)	Archeological Site LA 50,013 (CM101)	August 2, 1985 (#85001710)	Address Restricted	Pueblo Pintado	
13	Archeological Site LA 50,014 (CM 102)	Archeological Site LA 50,014 (CM 102)	August 2, 1985 (#85001711)	Address Restricted	Pueblo Pintado	
14	Archeological Site LA 50,015 (CM 102A)	Archeological Site LA 50,015 (CM 102A)	August 2, 1985 (#85001712)	Address Restricted	Pueblo Pintado	
15	Archeological Site LA 50,016 (CM 103)	Archeological Site LA 50,016 (CM 103)	August 2, 1985 (#85001713)	Address Restricted	Pueblo Pintado	
16	Archeological Site LA 50,017 (CM 104)	Archeological Site LA 50,017 (CM 104)	August 2, 1985 (#85001714)	Address Restricted	Pueblo Pintado	
17	Archeological Site LA 50,018	Archeological Site LA 50,018	August 2, 1985 (#85001715)	Address Restricted	Pueblo Pintado	
18	Archeological Site LA 50,019 (CM 105)	Archeological Site LA 50,019 (CM 105)	August 2, 1985 (#85001716)	Address Restricted	Pueblo Pintado	
19	Archeological Site LA 50,020 (CM 106)	Archeological Site LA 50,020 (CM 106)	August 2, 1985 (#85001717)	Address Restricted	Pueblo Pintado	
20	Archeological Site LA 50,021	Archeological Site LA 50,021	August 2, 1985 (#85001718)	Address Restricted	Pueblo Pintado	
21	Archeological Site LA 50,022 (CM 107)	Archeological Site LA 50,022 (CM 107)	August 2, 1985 (#85001719)	Address Restricted	Pueblo Pintado	
22	Archeological Site LA 50,023 (CM 118)	Archeological Site LA 50,023 (CM 118)	August 2, 1985 (#85001720)	Address Restricted	Pueblo Pintado	
23	Archeological Site LA 50,024 (CM 108)	Archeological Site LA 50,024 (CM 108)	August 2, 1985 (#85001721)	Address Restricted	Pueblo Pintado	
24	Archeological Site LA 50,025 (CM 109)	Archeological Site LA 50,025 (CM 109)	August 2, 1985 (#85001722)	Address Restricted	Pueblo Pintado	
25	Archeological Site LA 50,026 (CM 108)	Archeological Site LA 50,026 (CM 108)	August 2, 1985 (#85001723)	Address Restricted	Pueblo Pintado	
26	Archeological Site LA 50,027 (CM 111)	Archeological Site LA 50,027 (CM 111)	August 2, 1985 (#85001724)	Address Restricted	Pueblo Pintado	
27	Archeological Site LA 50,028 (CM 112)	Archeological Site LA 50,028 (CM 112)	August 2, 1985 (#85001725)	Address Restricted	Pueblo Pintado	
28	Archeological Site LA 50,030 (CM 114)	Archeological Site LA 50,030 (CM 114)	August 2, 1985 (#85001726)	Address Restricted	Pueblo Pintado	
29	Archeological Site LA 50,031 (CM 115)	Archeological Site LA 50,031 (CM 115)	August 2, 1985 (#85001727)	Address Restricted	Pueblo Pintado	
30	Archeological Site LA 50,033 (CM 117)	Archeological Site LA 50,033 (CM 117)	August 2, 1985 (#85001728)	Address Restricted	Pueblo Pintado	
31	Archeological Site LA 50,034	Archeological Site LA 50,034	August 2, 1985 (#85001729)	Address Restricted	Pueblo Pintado	
32	Archeological Site LA 50,035	Archeological Site LA 50,035	October 9, 1985 (#85003143)	Address Restricted	Pueblo Pintado	
33	Archeological Site LA 50,036	Archeological Site LA 50,036	August 2, 1985 (#85001730)	Address Restricted	Pueblo Pintado	
34	Archeological Site LA 50,037	Archeological Site LA 50,037	August 2, 1985 (#85001731)	Address Restricted	Pueblo Pintado	
35	Archeological Site LA 50,038	Archeological Site LA 50,038	August 2, 1985 (#85001732)	Address Restricted	Pueblo Pintado	
36	Archeological Site LA 50,044	Archeological Site LA 50,044	August 2, 1985 (#85001733)	Address Restricted	Pueblo Pintado	
37	Archeological Site LA 50,071 (CM 148)	Archeological Site LA 50,071 (CM 148)	August 2, 1985 (#85001734)	Address Restricted	Pueblo Pintado	
38	Archeological Site LA 50,072 (CM 94)	Archeological Site LA 50,072 (CM 94)	August 2, 1985 (#85001735)	Address Restricted	Pueblo Pintado	
39	Archeological Site LA 50,074 (CM 181)	Archeological Site LA 50,074 (CM 181)	August 2, 1985 (#85001736)	Address Restricted	Pueblo Pintado	
40	Archeological Site LA 50,077	Archeological Site LA 50,077	August 2, 1985 (#85001737)	Address Restricted	Pueblo Pintado	
41	Archeological Site LA 50,080	Archeological Site LA 50,080	August 2, 1985 (#85001738)	Address Restricted	Pueblo Pintado	
42	Ashcroft-Merrill Historic District	Ashcroft-Merrill Historic District	July 27, 1990 (#90001079)	Junction of Bloomfield and McNeil Sts. 35°08′09″N 108°29′41″W	Ramah	
43	Bee Burrow Archeological District	Bee Burrow Archeological District	December 10, 1984 (#84001296)	Along Seven Lakes Wash north of Seven Lakes; 35°48′45″N 107°57′02″W	Seven Lakes	
44	Borrego Pass Trading Post Historic District		March 29, 2012 (#11000475)	Building 1601, County Road 19; 35°39′26″N 108°06′20″W	Borrego Pass	
45	Casa de Estrella Archeological Site	Casa de Estrella Archeological Site	October 10, 1980 (#80002553)	Address Restricted	Crownpoint	
46	Chaco Culture National Historical Park	Chaco Culture National Historical Park	October 15, 1966 (#66000895)	Address Restricted	Thoreau	
47	Chief Theater	Chief Theater	May 16, 1988 (#87002223)	230 W. Coal Ave. 35°31′37″N 108°44′37″W	Gallup	"Pueblo Deco"-style theater built in 1920
48	C.N. Cotton Warehouse		January 14, 1988 (#87002226)	101 N. Third St. 35°31′40″N 108°44′41″W	Gallup	Destroyed by fire in May, 1984.
49	Cousins Bros. Trading Post		March 22, 2006 (#06000153)	768 A-D Cousins Rd. 35°15′04″N 108°53′42″W	Chi Chil Tah	
50	Dalton Pass Archeological Site	Dalton Pass Archeological Site	October 10, 1980 (#80002554)	Address Restricted	Crownpoint	
51	Drake Hotel	Drake Hotel	January 14, 1988 (#87002218)	216 E. 66th Ave. 35°31′43″N 108°44′19″W	Gallup	
52	El Morro Theater	El Morro Theater	May 16, 1988 (#87002221)	205-209 W. Coal Ave. 35°33′14″N 108°44′28″W	Gallup	
53	El Rancho Hotel	El Rancho Hotel	January 14, 1988 (#87002222)	100 E. 66th Ave. 35°31′46″N 108°43′18″W	Gallup	
54	Fort Wingate Archeological Site		October 10, 1980 (#80002558)	Address Restricted	Fort Wingate	
55	Fort Wingate Historic District	Fort Wingate Historic District	May 26, 1978 (#78003076)	State Road 400; 35°28′01″N 108°32′23″W	Fort Wingate	A boundary increase was approved March 13, 2026.
56	Gallup Commercial Historic District	Gallup Commercial Historic District	June 21, 2016 (#16000389)	Roughly bounded by US 66, W. Coal Ave., S. Puerco Dr. and S. 7th St. 35°31′37″N 108°44′42″W	Gallup	
57	Grand Hotel	Grand Hotel	May 25, 1988 (#87002217)	306 W. Coal Ave. 35°31′36″N 108°44′38″W	Gallup	
58	Greenlee Archeological Site	Greenlee Archeological Site	October 10, 1980 (#80002555)	Address Restricted	Crownpoint	
59	Halona Pueblo		February 10, 1975 (#75002066)	Zuni; 35°04′04″N 108°49′37″W	Gallup	
60	Harvey Hotel		May 25, 1988 (#87002219)	408 W. Coal Ave. 35°31′35″N 108°44′42″W	Gallup	
61	Haystack Archeological District	Haystack Archeological District	October 10, 1980 (#80002556)	Address Restricted	Crownpoint	
62	Roy T. Herman's Garage and Service Station	Roy T. Herman's Garage and Service Station	November 22, 1993 (#93001212)	State Road 122, 150 yards west of an exit from Interstate 40; 35°23′50″N 108°13′27″W	Thoreau	
63	Lebanon Lodge No. 22	Lebanon Lodge No. 22	February 14, 1989 (#87002225)	106 W. Aztec; 35°31′36″N 108°44′26″W	Gallup	
64	Manuelito Complex	Manuelito Complex	October 15, 1966 (#66000894)	Address Restricted	Manuelito	
65	McKinley County Courthouse	McKinley County Courthouse	February 15, 1989 (#87000879)	205-209 W. Hill St. 35°31′29″N 108°44′30″W	Gallup	
66	Palace Hotel	Palace Hotel	May 16, 1988 (#87002216)	235 W. Route 66; 35°31′39″N 108°44′36″W	Gallup	
67	Peggy's Pueblo	Peggy's Pueblo	August 16, 1994 (#94000993)	Address Restricted	Zuni Pueblo	
68	Redwood Lodge	Redwood Lodge	February 13, 1998 (#98000051)	907 E. 66th Ave. 35°31′50″N 108°43′46″W	Gallup	
69	Rex Hotel	Rex Hotel	January 14, 1988 (#87002215)	300 W. 66th Ave. 35°31′38″N 108°44′37″W	Gallup	
70	Southwestern Range and Sheep Breeding Laboratory Historic District		May 30, 2003 (#03000488)	Fort Wingate Work Center in the Cibola National Forest; 35°27′17″N 108°34′08″W	Fort Wingate	
71	Route 66, State maintained from Iyanbito to Rehobeth		November 19, 1997 (#97001397)	Former U.S. Route 66 from Iyanbito Interchange at Interstate 40 to State Police Station Rehobeth; 35°31′04″N 108°34′46″W	Rehobeth	
72	Route 66, State Maintained from Manuelito to the Arizona Border	Route 66, State Maintained from Manuelito to the Arizona Border	November 22, 1993 (#93001209)	Western side of the Manuelito grade separation southwest to the Arizona border 35°24′40″N 108°59′57″W	Mentmore	
73	Upper Kin Klizhin Archeological Site	Upper Kin Klizhin Archeological Site	October 10, 1980 (#80002557)	Address restricted	Crownpoint	Along Kin Klizhin Wash south of Chaco Canyon, north of Crownpoint
74	US Post Office	US Post Office	May 25, 1988 (#87002228)	201 S. 1st St. 35°31′39″N 108°44′25″W	Gallup	
75	Evon Zartman Vogt Ranch House		February 4, 1993 (#92001819)	1 mile south of Ramah, 500 feet east of State Road 53; 35°07′15″N 108°29′00″W	Ramah	
76	White Cafe	White Cafe	January 14, 1988 (#87002212)	100 W. 66th Ave. 35°31′41″N 108°44′27″W	Gallup	
77	Zuni-Cibola Complex	Zuni-Cibola Complex	December 2, 1974 (#74002267)	Address Restricted	Zuni Pueblo	Extends into Cibola and Valencia counties

== Former listings ==
	Name on the Register	Image	Date listed	Date removed	Location	City or town	Description
1	C.N. Cotton House		July 10, 1979 (#79003128)	August 22, 1984	406 W. Aztec Ave.	Gallup	Destroyed by fire in May, 1984.
2	Log Cabin Motel		November 22, 1993 (#93001213)	August 22, 2007	1010 West 66 Avenue	Gallup	Destroyed by fire on April 13, 2004.

== See also ==
- List of National Historic Landmarks in New Mexico
- National Register of Historic Places listings in New Mexico
