= Drake =

Drake may refer to:

== Animals and creatures ==
- A male duck
- Drake (mythology), a term related to and often synonymous with dragon

== People and fictional characters ==
- Sir Francis Drake, (1540–1596), English explorer and privateer
- Drake (surname), a list of people and fictional characters with the family name
- Drake (given name), a list of people and fictional characters with the given name
- Drake (musician) (born 1986), Canadian rapper, singer, and actor

== Places ==
=== United States ===
- Drake, Arizona, an unincorporated community
- Drake, Colorado, an unincorporated community
- Drake, Illinois, an unincorporated community
- Drake, Kentucky, an unincorporated community
- Drake, Missouri, an unincorporated community
- Drake, North Dakota, a town
- Drake, North Carolina, a place in Nash County near Dr. Franklin Hart Farm
- Drake, South Carolina, an unincorporated community
- Drake Park, Bend, Oregon
- Drake Peak, Oregon

=== Antarctica ===
- Drake Passage, between Cape Horn and Antarctica
- Drake Head, Oates Land, a headland
- Drake Icefall, Ellsworth Land

=== Australia ===
- Drake County, New South Wales, Australia
- Drake, New South Wales, a parish and rural community

=== Elsewhere ===
- Drake, Saskatchewan, Canada, a village
- Drake (Lewisham ward), a former electoral ward of Lewisham London Borough Council that existed from 1964 to 2002
- Drake (Plymouth ward), a ward in the city of Plymouth, UK

== Ships ==
- HMS Drake, several British Royal Navy ships
- Drake-class cruiser, a Royal Navy class of armoured cruisers in service up to 1920
- Pasha Bulker, later renamed Drake, a bulk carrier launched in 2006
- Drake (ship), various ships

== Schools and educational facilities ==
- Drake University, Des Moines, Iowa, US
  - Drake Bulldogs, the school's athletic program
  - Drake Stadium (1904), an outdoor multiuse sports field at Drake University from 1904 to 1925
  - Drake Stadium (Drake University), a sports facility on the campus
  - Drake Fieldhouse, an athletic facility
- Drake Stadium (UCLA), University of California, Los Angeles
- Drake Field (stadium), Auburn University
- Drake Performance and Event Center, Ohio State University
- J. F. Drake Middle School, Auburn, Alabama
- O. B. Drake Middle School, Arvada, Colorado
- Drake Planetarium and Science Center, Cincinnati, Ohio

== Other uses ==
- Battle of Goodenough Island or Operation Drake, a World War II battle
- Drake Supermarkets, an Australian chain
- Drake Hotel (disambiguation)
- Drake baronets, three titles in the Baronetage of England and one in the Baronetage of Great Britain
- Drake Street, Hong Kong
- Drake Field, a public-use airport south of Fayetteville, Arkansas
- Drake, two variants of the Goodyear Duck 1940s American light amphibious aircraft
- Drake Memorial Hospital, Cincinnati, Ohio, notable as a locale for crimes by serial killer Donald Harvey
- The Drake, the fictional hotel that is the subject of the American TV series 666 Park Avenue
- Drake (cannon), a medieval era cannon
- Nvidia Tegra T239 system on a chip for the Nintendo Switch 2 (codename "Drake")

== See also ==
- R. L. Drake Company, electronics manufacturer
- Drake equation
- Drake Fountain, Chicago, Illinois
- Drake House (disambiguation)
- Drake Well, an oil well in Pennsylvania which sparked the first oil boom in the US
- Drake's (disambiguation), a list of Drake's and Drakes
