= Gallup Commercial Historic District =

Historic district in New Mexico, United States

- U.S. National Register of Historic Places
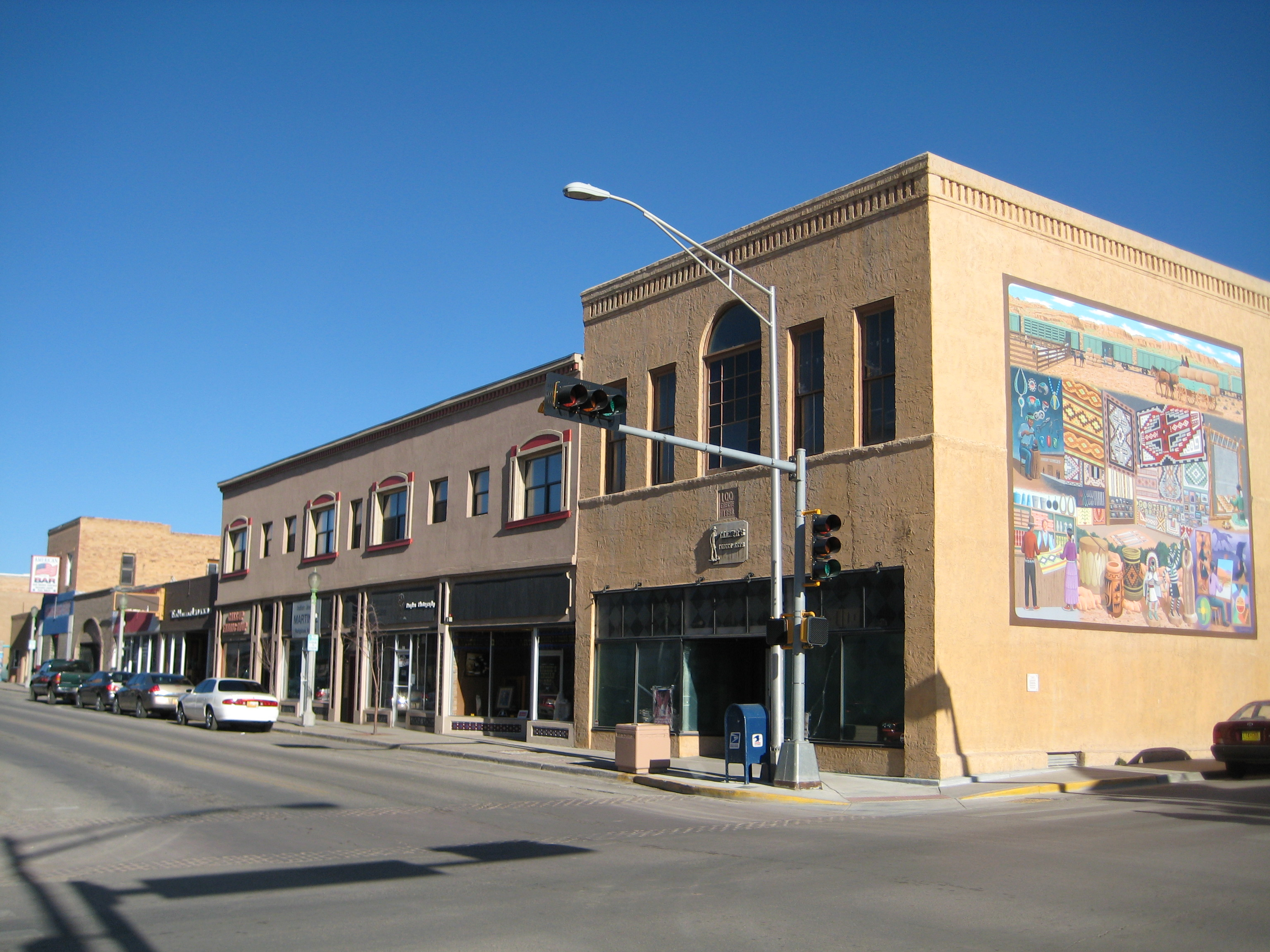

- Location within New Mexico
- Location: Roughly bounded by US 66, W. Coal Ave., S. Puerco Dr. and S. 7th St., Gallup, New Mexico
- Coordinates: 35°31′37″N 108°44′42″W
- Area: 38 acres (15 ha)
- NRHP reference No.: 16000389
- Added to NRHP: June 21, 2016

The Gallup Commercial Historic District is a historic district which was listed on the National Register of Historic Places in 2016.

It includes "the largest concentration of historic commercial buildings in Gallup", in one- and two-story stores along U.S. Route 66 and W. Coal Ave.in Gallup. It includes 65 contributing buildings, one contributing structure, and a contributing object, as well as 26 non-contributing buildings.

The district also includes seven properties already separately listed on the National Register:

- Rex Hotel
- Old U.S. Post Office
- Palace Lodge
- El Morro Theater
- Grand Hotel (Ricca's Mercantile)
- White Café, and
- Chief Theater.

The listing newly adds 58 contributing buildings and adds 38 acres (15 ha) to the National Register (excluding the area of the seven previously listed properties).
