= Drake House =

Drake House or Drake House Museum may refer to:

in Canada

- Drake House (Newfoundland), also known as "Drake House Museum", in Arnold's Cove, Newfoundland
- Drake mansion in toronto

in England

- Drake House (Beighton), Beighton, Sheffield

in the United States

(by state then city)

- Drake House (Prescott, Arizona), listed on the National Register of Historic Places (NRHP) in Yavapai County
- Col. C.F. Drake House, Weiser, Idaho, listed on the NRHP in Washington County
- John and Amanda Bigler Drake House, Winterset, Iowa, listed on the NRHP in Madison County
- Drake House (Minden, Louisiana), listed on the NRHP in Webster Parish
- Frances H. and Jonathan Drake House, Leominster, Massachusetts, listed on the NRHP in Worcester County
- Drake House (Michigan), a Michigan State Historic Site in Breckenridge, Michigan
- Edwin S. Drake Farmhouse, Northfield, Minnesota, listed on the NRHP in Rice County
- Nathaniel Drake House, also called the "Drake House Museum", Plainfield, New Jersey, listed on the NRHP in Union County
- Drake-Curtis House, Cochecton, New York, listed on the NRHP in Sullivan County
- Elam Drake House, Columbus, Ohio, listed on the NRHP in Franklin County
- Alonzo Drake House, Oakwood, Ohio, listed on the NRHP in Cuyahoga County
- June D. Drake House, Silverton, Oregon, listed on the NRHP in Marion County
- Drake Log Cabin, Apollo, Pennsylvania, listed on the NRHP in Armstrong County
- Hattie O. and Henry Drake Octagon House, Huron, South Dakota, listed on the NRHP in Beadle County
