= Chief Theater =

Chief Theater may refer to:

- Chief Theater (Coldwater, Kansas), listed on the National Register of Historic Places in Comanche County, Kansas
- Chief Theater (Gallup, New Mexico), listed on the National Register of Historic Places in McKinley County, New Mexico
