= Haystack, Newfoundland and Labrador =

Former settlement in Newfoundland and Labrador

Haystack
- Location of Haystack in Newfoundland
- Coordinates: 47°38′16″N 54°04′28″W
- Country: Canada

Population (2011)
  - Total: 0
- Time zone: UTC– 3:30 (Newfoundland Standard Time Zone)
  - Summer (DST): UTC– 2:30 (Newfoundland Daylight)
- Canadian Postal code: A2A
- Area code: 709

Haystack was a former fishing settlement located on the northern portion of Long Island, Placentia Bay of the island of Newfoundland in the province of Newfoundland and Labrador, Canada. People from the community freely chose to move to other places in the province during the resettlement program of the 1950s and 60s. Unlike most communities, residents were not paid to leave the community.

The community takes its name from a natural protuberance approximately 50 feet in height located (47.633829, -54.062453) on the extreme end of the peninsula surrounding the natural harbour; called the haystack.

== History ==
Prior to any settlement within Haystack, its close proximity to good fishing grounds it served as a seasonal base for fisherman. As the number of migratory fisherman grew it developed into a more permanent settlement which the first Newfoundland government census of 1836 showed a population along with Paddy Poor's Cove (renamed Spencers Cove) of 33 individuals.

In the 1845 census Haystack was no longer combined with Spencers Cove which recorded 11 people from two (2) families. In the 1857 Newfoundland census five (5) families with thirty-seven people in all were recorded. The families were of English origin. Grants were issued as early as 1847 for Robert Coffin, Thomas Rendell and Thomas Bugden. The population had reached forty-nine in 1869 and by that time it had both a Church of England church and school. The population had peaked in 1921 with 148 inhabitants.

Lovell's Newfoundland Directory (1871) notes some of the first inhabitants of haystack as Robert Coffin, planter, and James Allen, Thomas Drake, Samuel and Thomas Gilbert, Edward Hanna, John King, Joseph Upshall and Isaac Wakeley as fisherman.

The population of Haystack declined in population due to many factors, among which was the isolation and the spread of tuberculosis which took its toll on many of the young of Haystack. By 1945 the population had shrunk to 97 and by 1953 there were just ten (10) families remaining, with 23 children attending school.

== Resettlement ==
With the population declining and businesses relocating to larger centres on the mainland portion of the Avalon Peninsula, it had hastened the relocation of many of the remaining residents of Haystack. By September 1957 the remaining three (3) families left the once thriving community. While the remaining three (3) families left one resident, Frank Drake remained. After 12 years of being the lone resident of Haystack, in 1969 Frank had left haystack and moved to Arnold's Cove; his house was towed and still remains there. It is now formally called the Drake House and was designated a Registered Heritage Structure on March 27, 2003 by the Heritage Foundation of Newfoundland and Labrador. The property was designated as a representative example of those buildings that were floated out across Placentia Bay during the resettlement period. The building is listed on the Canadian Register of Historic Places.

The resettlement program of the Newfoundland government had played a major role in the resettlement of the residents of Harbour Buffett which led to the eventual decline and resettlement of Haystack.

== See also ==
- List of communities in Newfoundland and Labrador
- List of ghost towns in Newfoundland and Labrador
