= Palace Lodge =

Palace Lodge may refer to:

- Palace Lodge (Winslow, Indiana)
- Palace Lodge (Gallup, New Mexico), part of the Gallup Commercial Historic District
