= Drakes Creek =

Drakes Creek may refer to:

- Drakes Creek, Arkansas, an unincorporated community
- Drakes Creek (Arkansas), a stream in Arkansas
- Drakes Creek (Barren River), a stream in Kentucky
- Drakes Creek (East Fork Harveys Creek tributary), a stream in Pennsylvania
