= Drake's =

Drake's or Drakes may refer to:

== Companies ==
- Drake's (haberdashers), a UK haberdashers
- Drakes Bay Oyster Company, American oyster farm and restaurant
- Drake's Brewing Company, an American brewery
- Drake's Cakes, an American food company
- Drakes Supermarkets, a retail chain in Australia

== Places ==
- Drakes Bay, California, United States
- Drakes Bay, Costa Rica
- Drakes Creek (disambiguation), multiple locations
- Drakes Estero, estuary in California, United States
- Drakes Formation, geologic formation in Kentucky, United States
- Drake's Island, an island located south of England
- Drakes Island, Maine, United States
- Drake's Leat, a watercourse near Plymouth, England

== People ==
- Crystal Drakes, Barbadian politician
- Dominic Drakes, Barbadian cricketer
- Jesse Drakes, American jazz trumpet player
- Thomas Drakes, English cricketer
- Vasbert Drakes, West Indian cricketer

== Other uses ==
- Drake's Regiment of Militia, an American army regiment
- Edmonton Drakes, former Canadian baseball team

== See also ==
- Drake (disambiguation)
