= Franklin Farm =

Franklin Farm may refer to the following locations in the United States:

- Franklin Farm, Virginia, a census-designated place
- Metcalf-Franklin Farm, a historic farm in Rhode Island
- Dr. Franklin Hart Farm, a historic home and farm in North Carolina
