= Long Island (Placentia Bay, Newfoundland and Labrador) =

- Location within Newfoundland

Geography
- Location: Placentia Bay
- Coordinates: 47°34′00″N 54°05′30″W
- Length: 25 km (15.5 mi)
- Width: 3 km (1.9 mi)at its widest portion.

Administration
- Canada

Additional information
- Time zone: Newfoundland Standard Time Zone (UTC-3:30)
  - Summer (DST): Newfoundland Daylight (UTC-2:30)

Long Island is a long narrow island located in the inner portion of Placentia Bay. The longest axis of the island lies in a north-south direction. It is approximately 24 kilometres long and just over 3 kilometres at its widest point. Long Island along with Merasheen Island and Red Island make up the majority of the islands in Placentia Bay. Long Island is located approximately 22 kilometres northwest of Argentia. It is separated from Merasheen Island to the west by a 24 kilometre long channel that narrows to within 2.12 kilometres. Red Island is approximately 10 kilometres to the southwest of Long Island.

== Geography ==
It is currently an uninhabited island except for occasional visitors to resettled communities. The island had a number of communities which are all currently resettled. The communities were, Peaches Cove, Spencers Cove, Haystack, Kingwell, Port Royal (originally Mussell Harbour), Harbour Buffett and Coffin Cove.

The name Long Island is used to describe many islands in the province of Newfoundland and Labrador; there are at least 19 other islands that share the same name. The mainstay of the economy of the settlements of Long Island was the fishery.

The many coves and inlets that dotted its shores were given names of the early English and Irish settlers, names like Collett Cove, Hay Cove and Hennessey Cove, Kearney Head, Dicks Island and Isaac Island. The names of some of the uninhabited islands near Long Island were given characteristic names such as Bread and Cheese Islands to the north, Great Seal Island and Iron Island to the south, Dog Island off the eastern coast, and Barren Island to the west.

== History ==
The largest settlement on Long Island was Harbour Buffett, located on the southern end of the island. It was the main centre for supplies and the location of fish merchants. There were no roads on Long Island and most of the communities were connected by paths. The communities on the northern end of the island; Spencers Cove, Haystack and Peaches Cove was separated by a 16 kilometre long path through wilderness to Harbour Buffett.

Merchants operating out of Harbour Buffett in the 1800s and 1900s were James Chambers, Thomas Hann and Freeman Wareham. Alberto Wareham operated an enterprise from Spencers Cove. The residents of Spencers Cove and Harbour Buffett were amongst the last settlements to resettle under the controversial resettlement program of the 1960s and 1970s.

By the 1970s the entire population of the island had resettled to towns and villages on the mainland portions along Placentia Bay. The island then had reverted to its former role as a summer fishing base.
