= Drake Hotel =

Drake Hotel may refer to:

in Canada

- Drake Hotel (Toronto), Ontario

in the United States (by state)

- Drake Hotel (Chicago, Illinois), listed on the National Register of Historic Places (NRHP)
- Drake Hotel (Gallup, New Mexico), NRHP-listed in McKinley County
- Drake Hotel (New York City), New York
- Drake Hotel (Philadelphia, Pennsylvania), NRHP-listed
