= Iron Island =

Iron Island may refer to:

== Places ==
- East Lovejoy, Buffalo, nicknamed Iron Island
- Iron Island (Ontario), an island in Lake Nipissing, Ontario, Canada
- Iron Island, an island to the south of Long Island (Placentia Bay, Newfoundland and Labrador)

== Arts, entertainment, and media ==
- Ilha de Ferro, a 2018–2019 Brazilian web series
- Iron Island (film), a 2005 Iranian film
- Iron Island, a fictional location in Sinnoh, the continent featured in Pokémon Diamond and Pearl
- Iron Islands, a fictional location in the media series Game of Thrones
- The Iron Island, a 1910 serial by Edwy Searles Brooks
- The Iron Island, a 2015 short story by Jeff Somers

== See also ==
- Iony Island, a remote island in the Russian Far East
