= Manuelito Complex =

- U.S. National Register of Historic Places
- U.S. National Historic Landmark
- NM State Register of Cultural Properties
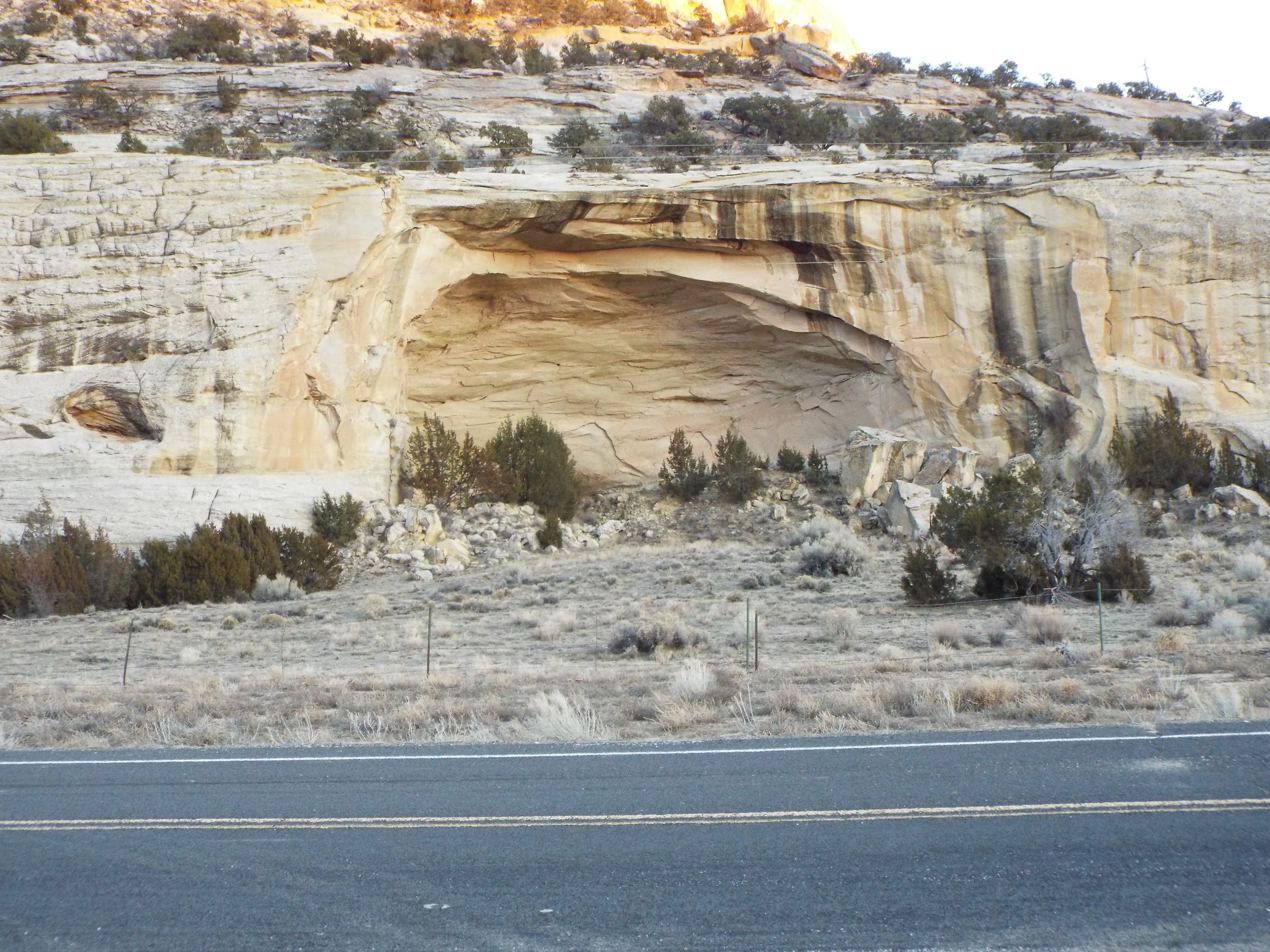
- Manuelito Canyon Historic District as viewed from Route 66
- Nearest city: Manuelito, New Mexico
- Area: 6,560 acres (2,650 ha)
- NRHP reference No.: 66000894
- NMSRCP No.: 239

Significant dates
- Added to NRHP: October 15, 1966
- Designated NHL: July 19, 1964
- Designated NMSRCP: March 13, 1972

The Manuelito Complex, also known as Manuelito Canyon Historic District, is a complex of archaeological sites in central western New Mexico. Located in and around Manuelito Canyon, roughly midway between Gallup, New Mexico and Lupton, Arizona, it includes an important collection of Ancestral Pueblo ruins, with an estimated occupation period of 700-1350 AD. The area was designated a National Historic Landmark in 1964.

== Description ==
Manuelito Canyon extends southeastward from Interstate 40 west of Gallup. Although it was long known to the local Navajo people for its archaeological remains, it did not draw significant attention from archaeologists until the 1930s. At that time it was considered for protection as a National Monument, but this did not come to pass. The area has as of 2015 been surveyed several times but has not been intensively examined.

One of the complex's larger features is a 500-room multi-story stone compound known as the "Big House", whose occupation period has been estimated to be 1200-1325 AD. "Atsee Nitsa", a small site, has 150 rooms, and is believed to have been occupied between 1150 and 1250.

== Occupation history ==
Manuelito Canyon's major period of occupation was during the Pueblo III Period, about 1150-1300 AD. Before this time, settlements in the canyon region were relatively small and dispersed. When the Chaco Canyon culture began its decline in the mid-12th century, surrounding places such as Manuelito Canyon saw an increase in what has been interpreted as residential rather than ceremonial construction. Both the Big House and Atsee Nitsa fall into this category. Kin Hocho'i, another great house in the canyon, is unusual in having a large ceremonial kiva, but only about 20 residential chambers.

== See also ==
- National Register of Historic Places in McKinley County, New Mexico
- List of National Historic Landmarks in New Mexico
