= Drakes Creek, Arkansas =

Unincorporated community

Coordinates: 36.02063°N 93.85992°W

Drakes Creek is an unincorporated community in Madison County, in the U.S. state of Arkansas.

The community takes its name from nearby Drakes Creek.
