= Roy T. Herman's Garage and Service Station =

- U.S. National Register of Historic Places
- NM State Register of Cultural Properties
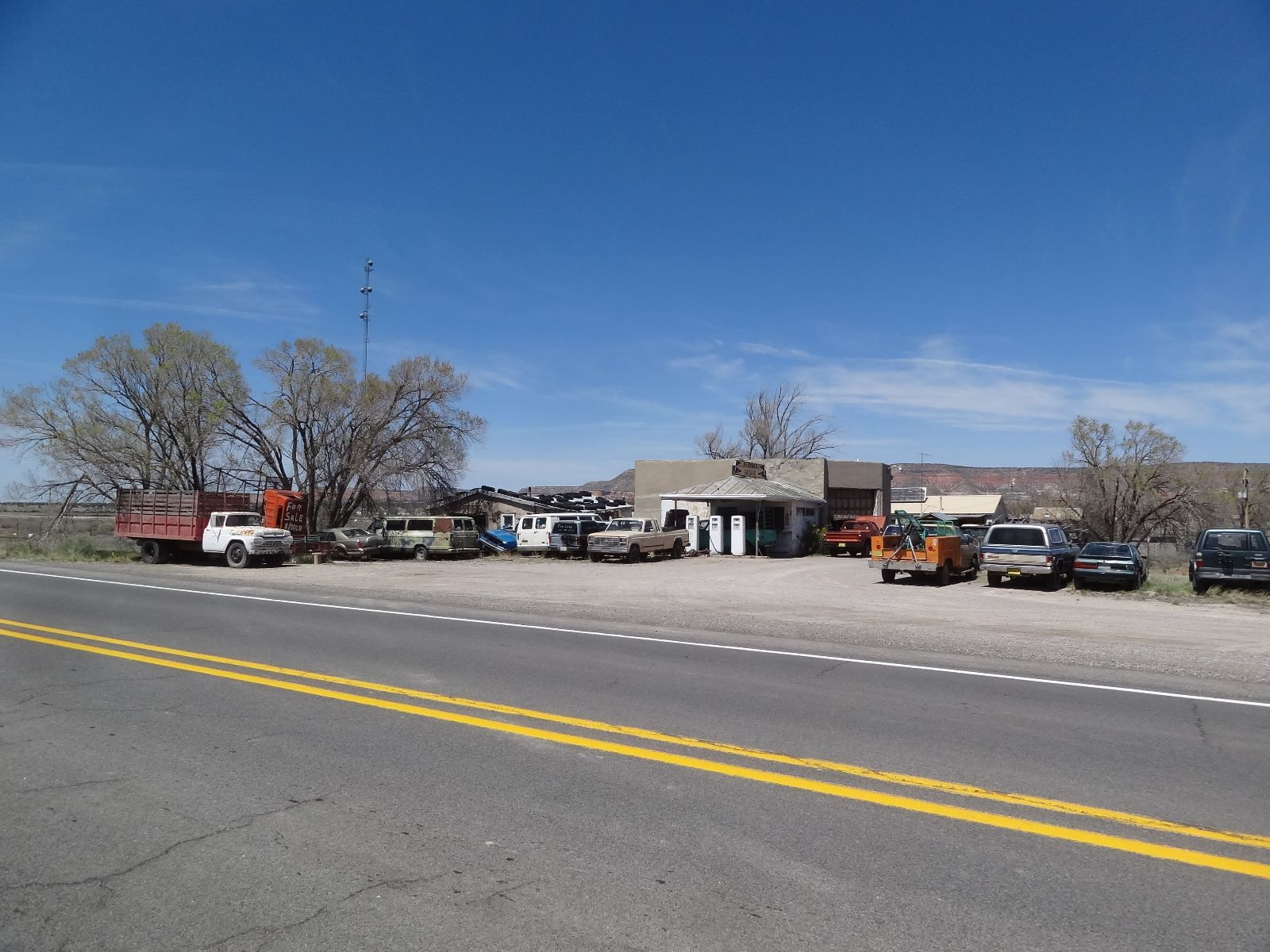
- Herman's Station in 2017

- Location within New Mexico Location within the United States
- Location: NM 122, 150 yds. W of I-40 exit, Thoreau, New Mexico
- Coordinates: 35°23′50″N 108°13′27″W
- Area: less than one acre
- Built: 1935
- MPS: Route 66 through New Mexico MPS
- NRHP reference No.: 93001212
- NMSRCP No.: 1579

Significant dates
- Added to NRHP: November 22, 1993
- Designated NMSRCP: September 17, 1993

Roy T. Herman's Garage and Service Station, located in Thoreau, New Mexico on the former U.S. Route 66, what is now New Mexico State Road 122, about 150 yards west of an exit from Interstate 40, was built in 1935. It was listed on the National Register of Historic Places in 1993.

It was built as a Standard Oil Company station on Route 66 in Grants, New Mexico in 1935. It was moved to Thoreau in 1937, where it was the first business on a new stretch of new alignment of the highway, and it served as a filling station until 1963, then moved 200 yards along the highway to serve as a car repair garage.

== See also ==
- National Register of Historic Places listings in McKinley County, New Mexico
