= East Fork Harveys Creek =

Physical characteristics
- Source
  - location: valley in Lehman Township, Luzerne County, Pennsylvania
  - elevation: 1,160 ft (350 m)
- Mouth
  - location: Harveys Creek in Jackson Township, Luzerne County, Pennsylvania
  - coordinates: 41°15′06″N 75°59′56″W
  - elevation: 784 ft (239 m)
- Length: 4.8 mi (7.7 km)
- Basin size: 7.31 mi^{2} (18.9 km^{2})

Basin features
- Progression: Harveys Creek → Susquehanna River → Chesapeake Bay
- Tributaries
  - left: Drakes Creek
  - right: two unnamed tributaries

East Fork Harveys Creek is a tributary of Harveys Creek in Luzerne County, Pennsylvania, in the United States. It is approximately 4.8 miles (7.7 km) long and flows through Lehman Township and Jackson Township. The watershed of the creek has an area of 7.31 square miles (18.9 km^{2}). It has one named tributary, which is known as Drakes Creek. East Fork Harveys Creek is considered by the Pennsylvania Department of Environmental Protection to be impaired. An attempt to rename the creek "Bidlack Creek" in 2005 was unsuccessful. The creek is considered to be a Coldwater Fishery. Two areas in its vicinity are on listed the Luzerne County Natural Areas Inventory.

== Course ==
East Fork Harveys Creek begins in a valley in Lehman Township. It flows south-southwest for more than a mile, receiving two unnamed tributaries from the right. The creek continues meandering south-southwest, leaving Lehman Township and entering Jackson Township. In this township, it turns southeast and passes through two lakes before turning south-southeast. After approximately a mile and a half, it receives its only named tributary, Drakes Creek, from the left. East Fork Harveys Creek then turns southwest and after several tenths of a mile reaches its confluence with Harveys Creek.

East Fork Harveys Creek joins Harveys Creek 3.12 miles (5.02 km) upstream of its mouth.

=== Tributaries ===
East Fork Harveys Creek has one named tributary, which is known as Drakes Creek. Drakes Creek joins East Fork Harveys Creek 0.40 miles (0.64 km) upstream of its mouth and its watershed has an area of 2.10 square miles (5.4 km^{2}).

== Hydrology ==
East Fork Harveys Creek is considered by the Pennsylvania Department of Environmental Protection to be impaired by organic enrichment and low levels of dissolved oxygen from natural sources and "other" sources. However, the exact cause of the impairment is unknown. A total maximum daily load will not be completed until the cause of the impairment is fully understood.

As of 1999, the Pennsylvania Department of Corrections has a permit to discharge treated sewage into East Fork Harveys Creek.

== Geography and geology ==
The elevation near the mouth of East Fork Harveys Creek is 784 feet (239 m) above sea level. The elevation of the creek's source is just under 1,160 feet (350 m) above sea level.

== Watershed ==
The watershed of East Fork Harveys Creek has an area of 7.31 square miles (18.9 km^{2}). The stream is entirely within the United States Geological Survey quadrangle of Kingston.

The designated uses of East Fork Harveys Creek are for aquatic life, for water supply, and for recreation.

East Fork Harveys Creek flows past a state prison. An impoundment is also located on the creek near the prison. In Lehman Township, the creek has a thin riparian buffer, which is near agricultural land.

== History and name ==
East Fork Harveys Creek was entered into the Geographic Names Information System on August 2, 1979. Its identifier in the Geographic Names Information System is 1192404.

John Lamoreaux and Daniel Davenport constructed a sawmill on East Fork Harveys Creek in 1823.

East Fork Harveys Creek has been named as such on federal maps since 1946. However, it has also historically been known as Bidlack Creek. For this reason, Shavertown resident Fred Murray proposed in 2005 that the creek be officially renamed to Bidlack Creek. However, at the June 6, 2006 meeting of the United States Board of Geographic Names, the proposal was declined, since the creek's current name was widely used in publications and the Lehman Township Supervisors and the Pennsylvania State Geographic Board opposed the name change.

In 1997, the Luzerne County Commissioners received permission to replace an existing bridge carrying T-605 over East Fork Harveys Creek. The replacement bridge was to be 16 feet (4.9 m) long and have a clearance of 6 feet (1.8 m) underneath.

== Biology ==
There is a partly flooded forest of eastern hemlock along East Fork Harveys Creek in Jackson Township and Lehman Township. This forest is listed on the Luzerne County Natural Areas Inventory. In addition to eastern hemlock, it contains red maple and a number of other deciduous trees.

The riparian buffer of East Fork Harveys Creek in Lehman Township is also listed on the Luzerne County Natural Areas Inventory. This forest mainly consists of red maple.

In 2012, four great blue heron nests were observed along East Fork Harveys Creek. Wild trout reproduce naturally in a section of the creek. This section is 3.11 miles (5.01 km) long. The creek is designated as a Coldwater Fishery.

== See also ==
- List of rivers of Pennsylvania
