= Drake (ship) =

Several ships have been named Drake:

- HMS Drake, a series of ships of the Royal Navy that share the name Drake
- USS Drake, an Admirable-class minesweeper of the United States Navy later renamed Ampere
- Ella Drake, an American wooden schooner built in 1868. Official no. 185702
- M. M. Drake, a tugboat built in 1879. Official no. 91151. After burning in 1899, the hull was rebuilt and renamed Jessie. Abandoned in 1920.
- L. W. Drake, an American wooden barge built in 1881 Official no. 45145. Stranded and abandoned under Canadian registry in 1903.
- SS M.M. Drake (1882), an American wooden schooner. Official no. 91485. Foundered with her tow, the schooner Michigan, off Vermilion Point in 1901.
- Anthea, formerly renamed Drake, a bulk carrier launched in 2006

== See also ==
- Drake-class cruiser
