= Drake (given name) =

- Gender: Masculine

Origin
- Word/name: English
- Meaning: "Dragon" or "Snake" or "Male duck"

Drake is a masculine given name of English origin meaning "dragon" or "snake".

== Notable people with the given name "Drake" include ==
- Drake Baldwin (born 2001), American baseball player
- Drake Batherson (born 1998), Canadian ice hockey player
- Drake Bell (born 1986), American actor and musician
- Drake Berehowsky (born 1974), Canadian ice hockey player
- Drake Boutwell, American politician
- Drake Britton (born 1989), American baseball player
- Drake Burnette (born 1985), American actress
- Drake Caggiula (born 1994), Canadian ice hockey player
- Drake Callender (born 1998), American soccer player
- Drake Carr (born 1993), American artist
- Drake Dabney (born 2002), American football player
- Drake Diener (born 1981), American basketball player
- Drake Doremus (born 1983), American film director
- Drake Dunsmore (born 1988), American football player
- Drake Edens (1925–1982), American politician
- Drake Garrett (born 1946), American football player
- Drake Hadeed (born 2007), Antiguan footballer
- Drake Hogestyn (1953–2024), American actor
- Drake Jackson (born 2001), American football player
- Drake Jensen (born 1970), Canadian musician
- Drake Levin (1946–2009), American musician
- Drake Lindsey (born 2005), American football player
- Drake London (born 2001), American football player
- Drake Lubega, Ugandan businessman
- Drake Maye (born 2002), American football player
- Drake Maverick (born 1983), English professional wrestler
- Drake McElroy (born 1969), American athlete
- Drake Milligan, American singer
- Drake Nevis (born 1989), American football player
- Drake Nugent (born 2001), American football player
- Drake Olson (born 1955), American racing driver
- Drake Powell (born 2005), American basketball player
- Drake Rymsha (born 1998), American ice hockey player
- Drake Sather (1959–2004), American comedian
- Drake Stoops (born 1999), American football player
- Drake Thadzi (born 1964), Malawian boxer
- Drake Thomas (born 2000), American football player
- Drake U'u (born 1990), American-Australian basketball player
- Drake Von (born 2002), American pornographic film actor
- Drake White (born 1983), American singer
- Drake Wuertz (born 1984), American professional wrestler

== Fictional characters ==
- Drake Maijstral, a character in novels written by Walter Jon Williams
- Dr. Drake Ramoray, a character that the fictional character Joey Tribbiani plays in Days of Our Lives in TV show Friends
- Drake of the 99 Dragons, the titular protagonist and the 2003 Video game of same name
- Drake, a The main antagonist in the 1995 Animated film The Pebble and the Penguin
