= Drakes Creek (East Fork Harveys Creek tributary) =

Physical characteristics
- Source
  - location: village of Chase, in Jackson Township, Luzerne County, Pennsylvania
  - elevation: between 980 and 1,000 feet (300 and 300 m)
- Mouth
  - location: East Fork Harveys Creek in Jackson Township, Luzerne County, Pennsylvania
  - coordinates: 41°15′23″N 75°59′44″W
  - elevation: 866 ft (264 m)
- Length: 2.2 mi (3.5 km)
- Basin size: 2.10 mi^{2} (5.4 km^{2})
- Discharge
  - average: 260 cu ft/s (7.4 m^{3}/s) peak annual discharge at river mile 0.51 (10% probability)

Basin features
- Progression: East Fork Harveys Creek → Harveys Creek → Susquehanna River → Chesapeake Bay

Drakes Creek is a tributary of East Fork Harveys Creek in Luzerne County, Pennsylvania, in the United States. It is approximately 2.2 miles (3.5 km) long and flows through Jackson Township. The watershed of the creek has an area of 2.10 square miles (5.4 km^{2}). In 1974, the creek itself was described as having "excellent" water quality. The surficial geology in its watershed features Wisconsinan Till, Wisconsinan Ice-Contact Stratified Drift, and bedrock consisting of sandstone, conglomeratic sandstone, shale, and coal.

== Course ==
Drakes Creek begins in the village of Chase, in Jackson Township. It flows west for a few tenths of a mile before turning southwest and flowing through a valley for more than a mile. The creek then turns south for a short distance before turning south-southwest. After several tenths of a mile, it reaches its confluence with East Fork Harveys Creek.

Drakes Creek joins East Fork Harveys Creek 0.40 miles (0.64 km) upstream of its mouth.

== Hydrology ==
At river mile 0.51, the peak annual discharge of Drakes Creek has a 10 percent chance of reaching 260 cubic feet per second and a 2 percent chance of reaching 420 cubic feet per second. It has a 1 percent chance of reaching 510 cubic feet per second and a 0.2 percent chance of reaching 700 cubic feet per second.

Upstream of Pine Tree Road, the peak annual discharge of Drakes Creek has a 10 percent chance of reaching 200 cubic feet per second and a 2 percent chance of reaching 320 cubic feet per second. It has a 1 percent chance of reaching 380 cubic feet per second and a 0.2 percent chance of reaching 550 cubic feet per second.

== Geography and geology ==
The elevation near the mouth of Drakes Creek is 866 feet (264 m) above sea level. The elevation of the creek's source is between 980 and 1,000 feet (300 and 300 m) above sea level.

A mountain known as Larksville Mountain runs parallel to Drakes Creek on the creek's eastern side.

The surficial geology in the vicinity of Drakes Creek mostly features a glacial or resedimented till known as Wisconsinan Till and bedrock consisting of sandstone, conglomeratic sandstone, shale, and coal. However, there are also two patches of Wisconsinan Ice-Contact Stratified Drift, which consists of stratified sand and gravel and some boulders, in the vicinity of the creek. One patch is the creek's headwaters in the community of Chase.

== Watershed ==
The watershed of Drakes Creek has an area of 2.10 square miles (5.4 km^{2}). The stream is entirely within the United States Geological Survey quadrangle of Kingston.

== History ==
Drakes Creek was entered into the Geographic Names Information System on August 2, 1979. Its identifier in the Geographic Names Information System is 1173453.

In a 1974 by the Pennsylvania Bureau of Water Quality Management, Drakes Creek was described as having "excellent" water quality.

== See also ==
- List of rivers of Pennsylvania
