= Thomas Drakes =

English cricketer (1908–1974)

Personal information
- Full name: Thomas Edwin Drakes
- Born: 7 March 1908; Bardney, Lincolnshire, England
- Died: 10 May 1974 (aged 66); Hainault, Essex, England
- Batting: Right-handed
- Bowling: Right-arm fast-medium

Domestic team information
- Years: Team
- 1926–1933: Lincolnshire
- 1929: Cambridge University

Career statistics
Competition	First-class
Matches	8
Runs scored	140
Batting average	14.00
100s/50s	–/–
Top score	39*
Balls bowled	1,213
Wickets	20
Bowling average	32.40
5 wickets in innings	1
10 wickets in match	–
Best bowling	5/70
Catches/stumpings	6/–
- Source: Cricinfo, 17 February 2019

Thomas Edwin Drakes (7 March 1908 – 10 May 1974) was an English first-class cricketer.

Born at Bardney in Lincolnshire, Drakes made his debut in minor counties cricket for Lincolnshire against Buckinghamshire in the 1926 Minor Counties Championship. He played minor counties cricket for Lincolnshire until 1933, making 42 appearances in the Minor Counties Championship. He studied at St Catharine's College, Cambridge. While at Cambridge he played first-class cricket for Cambridge University in 1929, making his debut against Essex at Fenner's. He made eight appearances in first-class matches during 1929, scoring 140 runs with a high score of 39 not out, while with his right-arm fast-medium he took 20 wickets at an average of 32.40, with best figures of 5 for 70. These figures were his only first-class five wicket haul and came on debut against Essex.

He later assisted the Army Cadet Force as a second lieutenant in the 1950s. He died at Hainault in May 1974.
