= Drake House (Newfoundland) =

Heritage structure in Arnold's Cove, Newfoundland and Labrador

Coordinates: 47.76017°N 53.98569°W

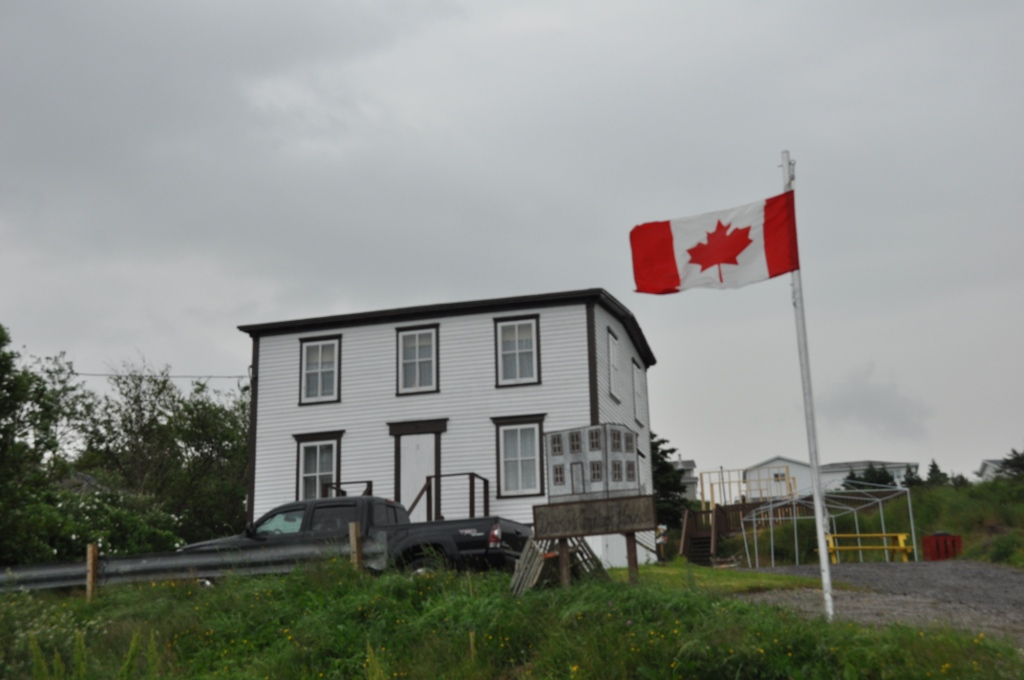
Drake House

The Drake House is a two-story house with a low-pitched gable roof. It is located at 319 Main Road, Arnold's Cove, Newfoundland and Labrador, Canada.

== History of the property ==
Drake House was constructed in the 1890s in the community of Haystack, Placentia Bay. It was constructed by George Drake and his brother John. Frank Drake, George's son, inherited the property and lived in the building all his life. When Haystack was resettled Frank Drake refused to move, and remained in the house at Haystack for an additional 12 years. In 1969 the house was floated by barge from Haystack to its present site in Arnold's Cove. Frank Drake died in 2002, and was buried at Haystack.

The oldest house standing in Arnold's Cove, the property has since been acquired by the Town of Arnold's Cove and has been restored. It now serves as a historical interpretation centre and community museum, and has housed demonstrations of traditional crafts such as knitting and quilting. The building was officially opened July 7, 2005.

== Construction type ==
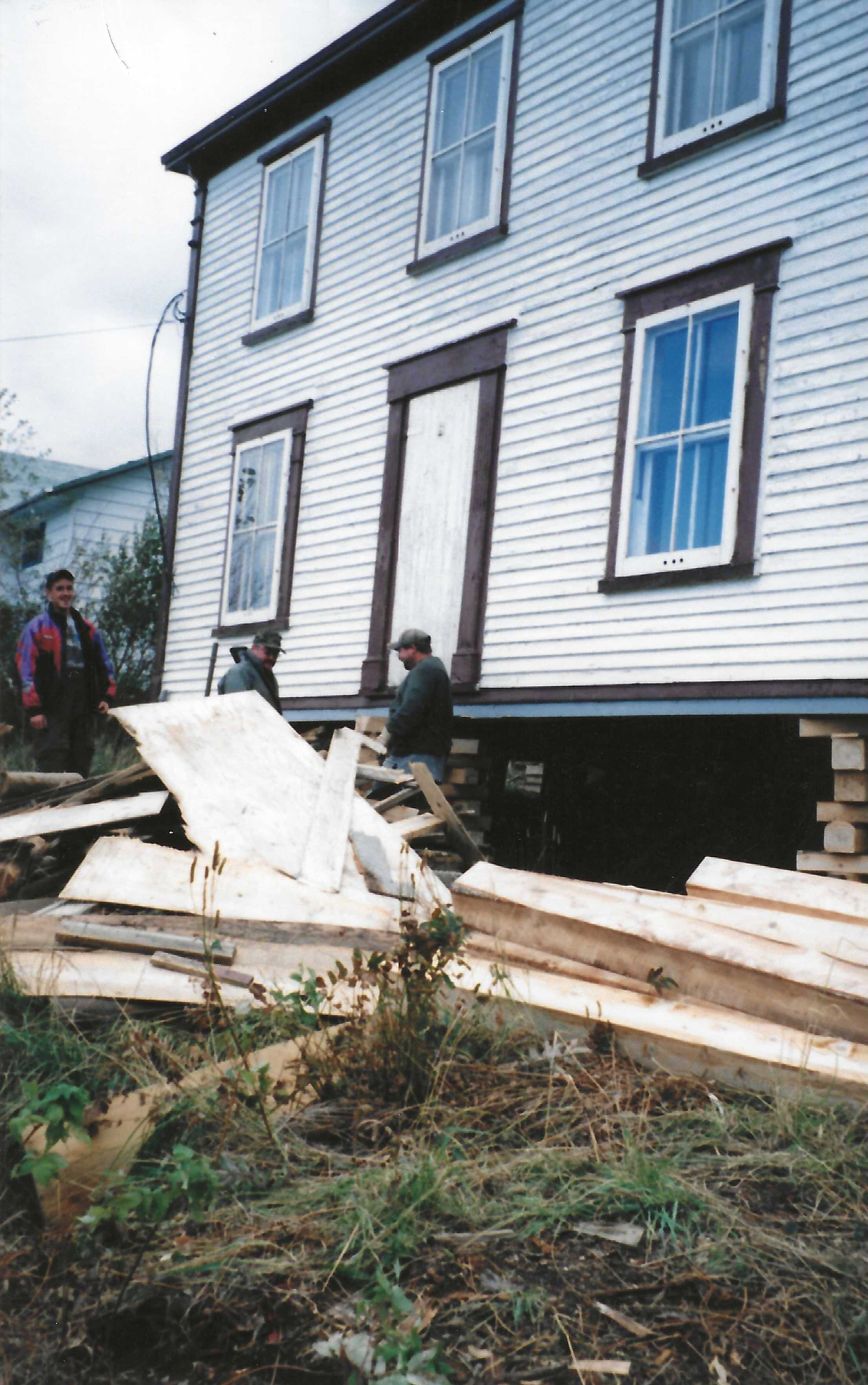
Drake House under restoration circa 2004

The house itself is of wood construction with a tar paper roof, and follows a standard Georgian central hall plan. On the exterior, the building features decorative woodwork on the corner boards and above the windows and central doorway on the main facade. Historical photographs indicate that the central doorway, with its original etched glass door intact, never had a bridge or stairway leading to it. The door then was probably never used as an entranceway, neither before nor after its relocation from Haystack. In 2016, it was noted:

There has been little change made to the interior of the building, and the upstairs portion of the house in particular is well preserved. The interior features a fine central staircase, unpainted wood trim, and largely unpainted tongue and groove ceilings with wood medallions. Several original pieces of furniture, a trunk of papers belonging to Frank Drake, old patent medicine bottles, a bed with its original straw mattress, and many other artifacts dating to the resettlement period remain in the building.

== Heritage designation and museum ==
The Drake House was designated a Registered Heritage Structure on March 27, 2003 by the Heritage Foundation of Newfoundland and Labrador. The property was designated as a representative example of those buildings that were floated out across Placentia Bay during the resettlement period. The structure is symbolic of that episode of Newfoundland's history, and is commemorative of that time. The building is listed on the Canadian Register of Historic Places. It was restored circa 2004 and opened as a community museum.

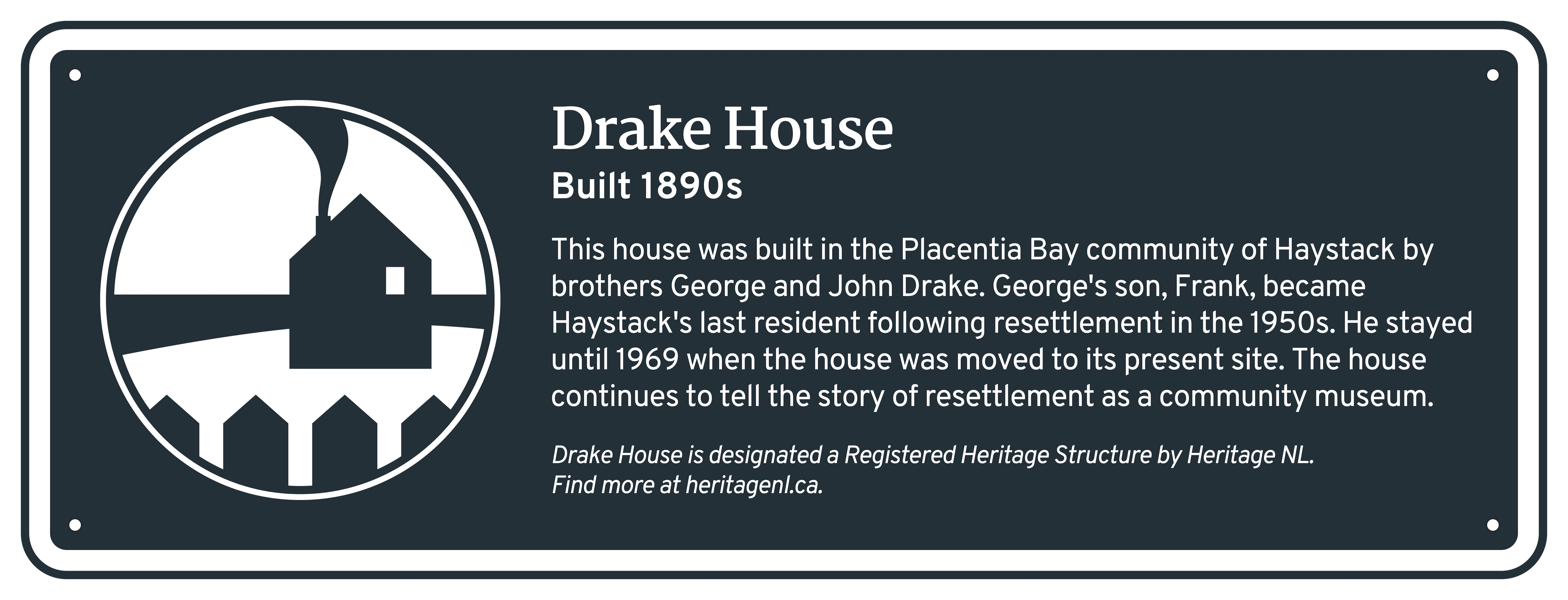
Plaque commemorating the Drake House as a Registered Heritage Structure

In 2018, the heritage committee a series of quilting events, which culminated in the participants crafting a crazy quilt to adorn Frank Drake's bed. The museum has also been involved in traditional boat building events, and commemorating the resettlement era through a mobile app.

== See also ==
- Newfoundland outport
