= Chief Theater (Coldwater, Kansas) =

- U.S. National Register of Historic Places
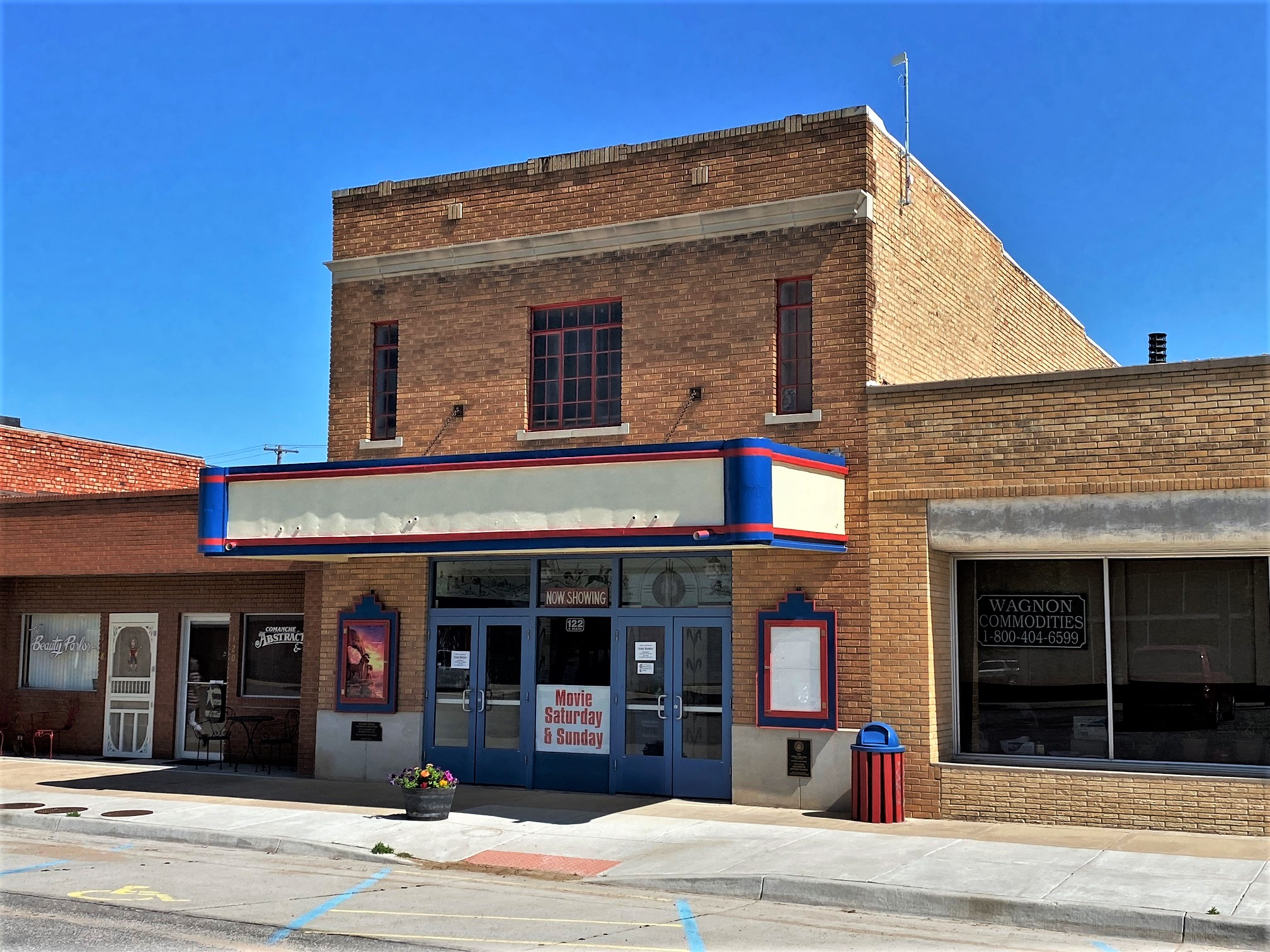
- The Chief Theater in 2021

- Location within Kansas Location within the United States
- Location: 122 E. Main St. Coldwater, Kansas
- Coordinates: 37°16′19″N 99°19′39″W
- Area: Less than one acre
- Built: 1928
- Built by: Gossett, Paul E.; Howard, Thomas H.
- Architectural style: Late 19th And Early 20th Century American Movements, Two-part Commercial Block
- MPS: Theaters and Opera Houses of Kansas MPS
- NRHP reference No.: 05000010
- Added to NRHP: February 9, 2005

The Chief Theater, at 122 E. Main St. in Coldwater, Kansas, was built in 1928. Also known as the Gossett Theater and as Stark's Comanche Theatre, it was listed on the National Register of Historic Places in 2005.

It was designed by architect Paul E. Gossett and built by contractor Thomas H. Howard. It is a two-story two-part commercial block building.
