= Drake, South Carolina =

- unincorporated community
- Location within South Carolina
- Coordinates: 34.473°N 79.667°W
- Country: United States
- State: South Carolina
- County: Marlboro
- Elevation: 85 ft (26 m)
- Time zone: UTC-5 (Eastern (EST))
  - Summer (DST): UTC-4 (EDT)
- ZIP code: 29516
- Area codes: 843, 854
- GNIS feature ID: 1231237

Drake is an unincorporated community in Marlboro County, South Carolina, United States.

== Geography ==
Drake is located at latitude 35.523 and longitude –79.667. The elevation is 85 feet.
