= Redwood Lodge =

- U.S. National Register of Historic Places
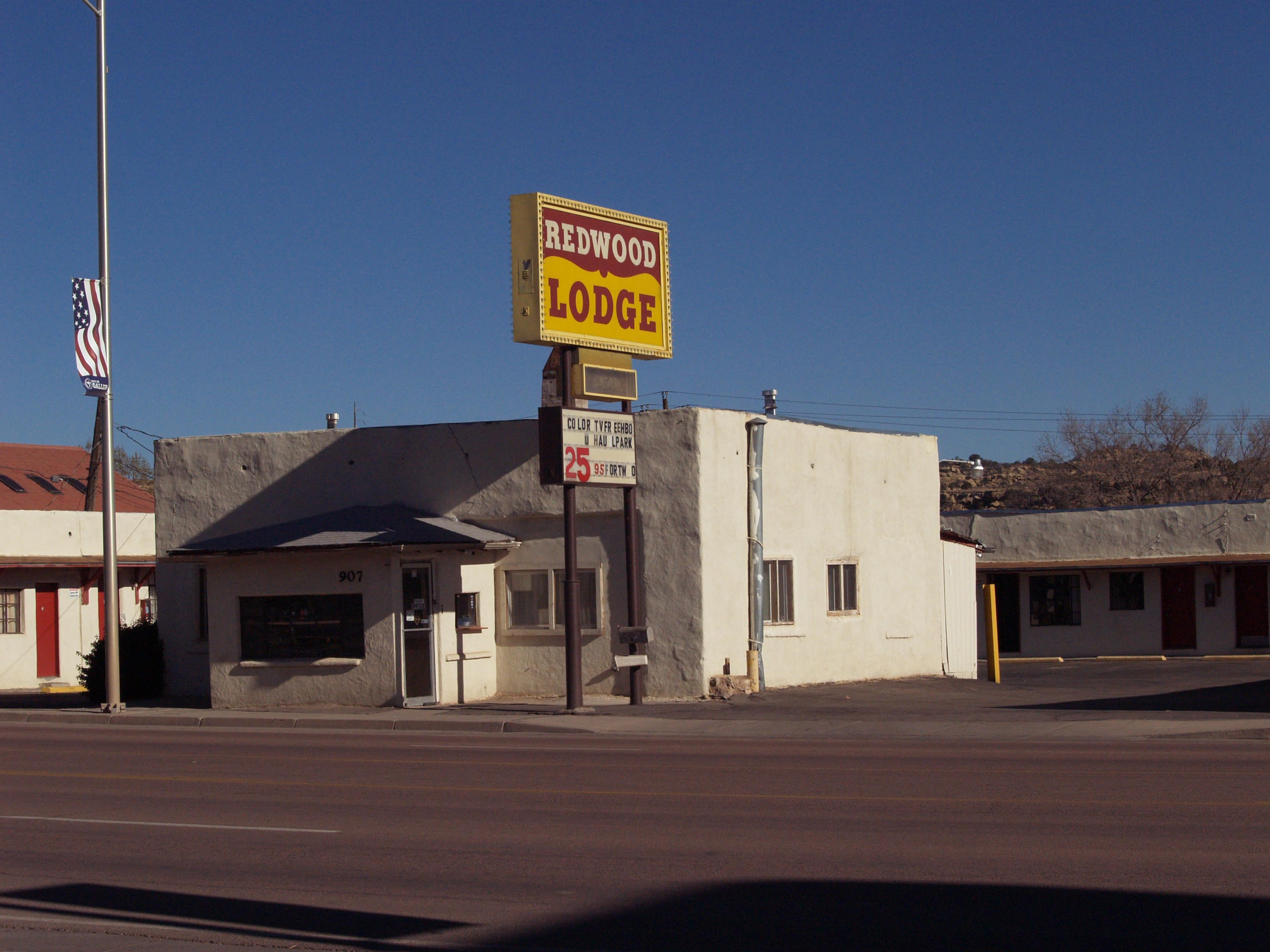

- Location within New Mexico
- Location: 907 E. 66 Ave., Gallup, New Mexico
- Coordinates: 35°31′50″N 108°43′46″W
- Area: less than one acre
- Built: 1931
- Architectural style: Southwest vernacular
- MPS: Route 66 through New Mexico MPS
- NRHP reference No.: 98000051
- Added to NRHP: February 13, 1998

The Redwood Lodge, at 907 E. 66 Ave. in Gallup, New Mexico, was built in 1931. It was listed on the National Register of Historic Places in 1998.

It was built by Jim Dougherty, a mechanic who operated a garage in what later was the motel's manager's residence. The motel was known as Jim's Modern Court. In 1952 it was bought by Steve and Mary Rudick, who renamed it the Redwood Lodge and operated it until 1983.

It was deemed notable as "one of the best examples of a largely unaltered pre-World War II tourist court remaining along Route 66 in New Mexico." It is described "Southwest vernacular" in style. Its historical listing includes three contributing buildings and one contributing object.
