= Ashcroft-Merrill Historic District =

- U.S. National Register of Historic Places
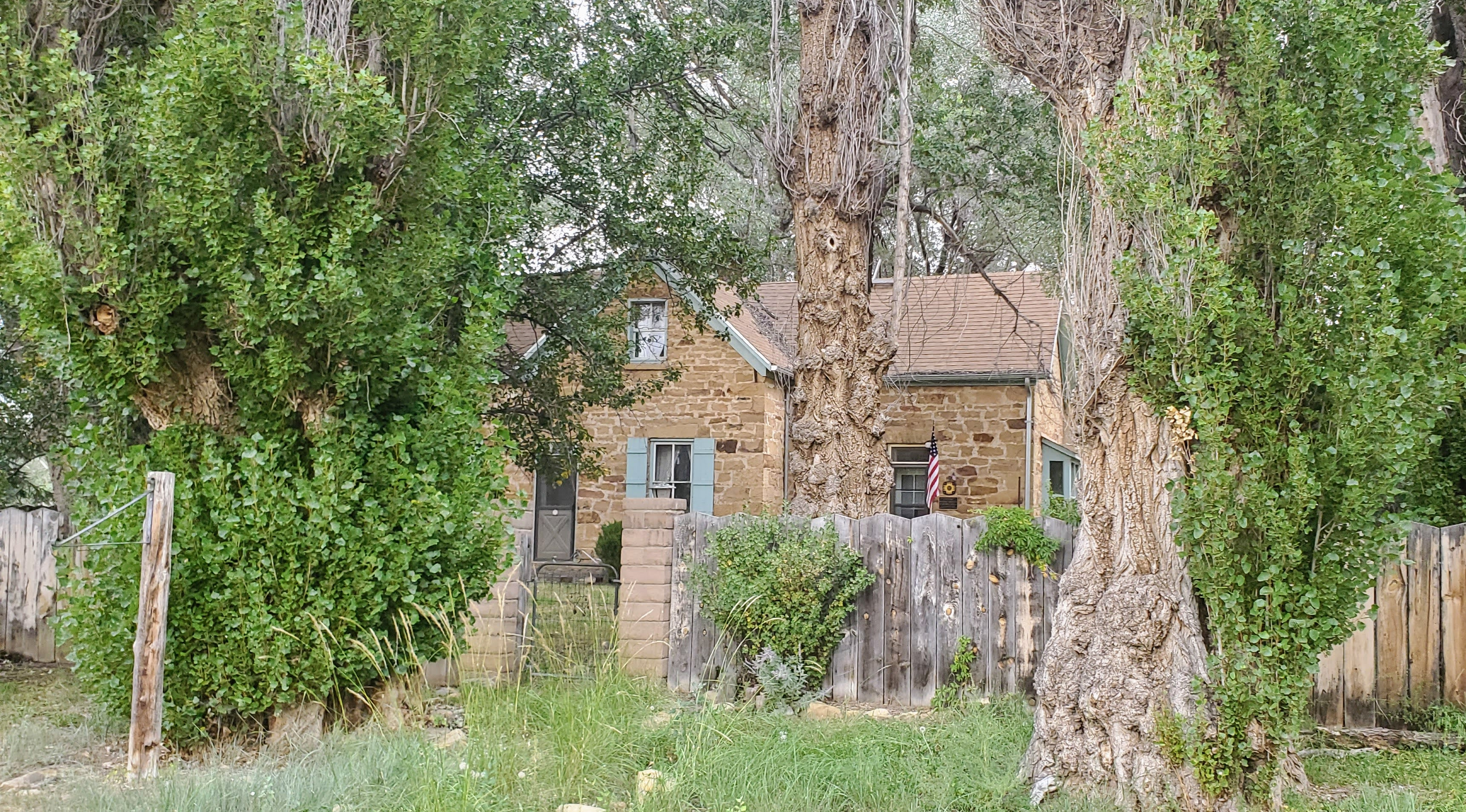
- Josiah Emer Ashcroft House

- Location within New Mexico
- Location: Jct. of Bloomfield and McNeil Sts., Ramah, New Mexico
- Coordinates: 35°08′09″N 108°29′41″W
- Area: 1.1 acres (0.45 ha)
- Built by: Waite, John William
- Architectural style: Vernacular late 19th-c Amer
- NRHP reference No.: 90001079
- Added to NRHP: July 27, 1990

The Ashcroft-Merrill Historic District is a historic district in Ramah, New Mexico which was listed on the National Register of Historic Places in 1990.

It is a 1.1 acres (0.45 ha) area located at the junction of Bloomfield and McNeil Streets. It included three contributing buildings, two contributing structures, and one contributing site.

It includes work by stonemason John William Waite.

It includes a hotel.
