= Frances H. and Jonathan Drake House =

Historic house in Massachusetts, United States

- U.S. National Register of Historic Places
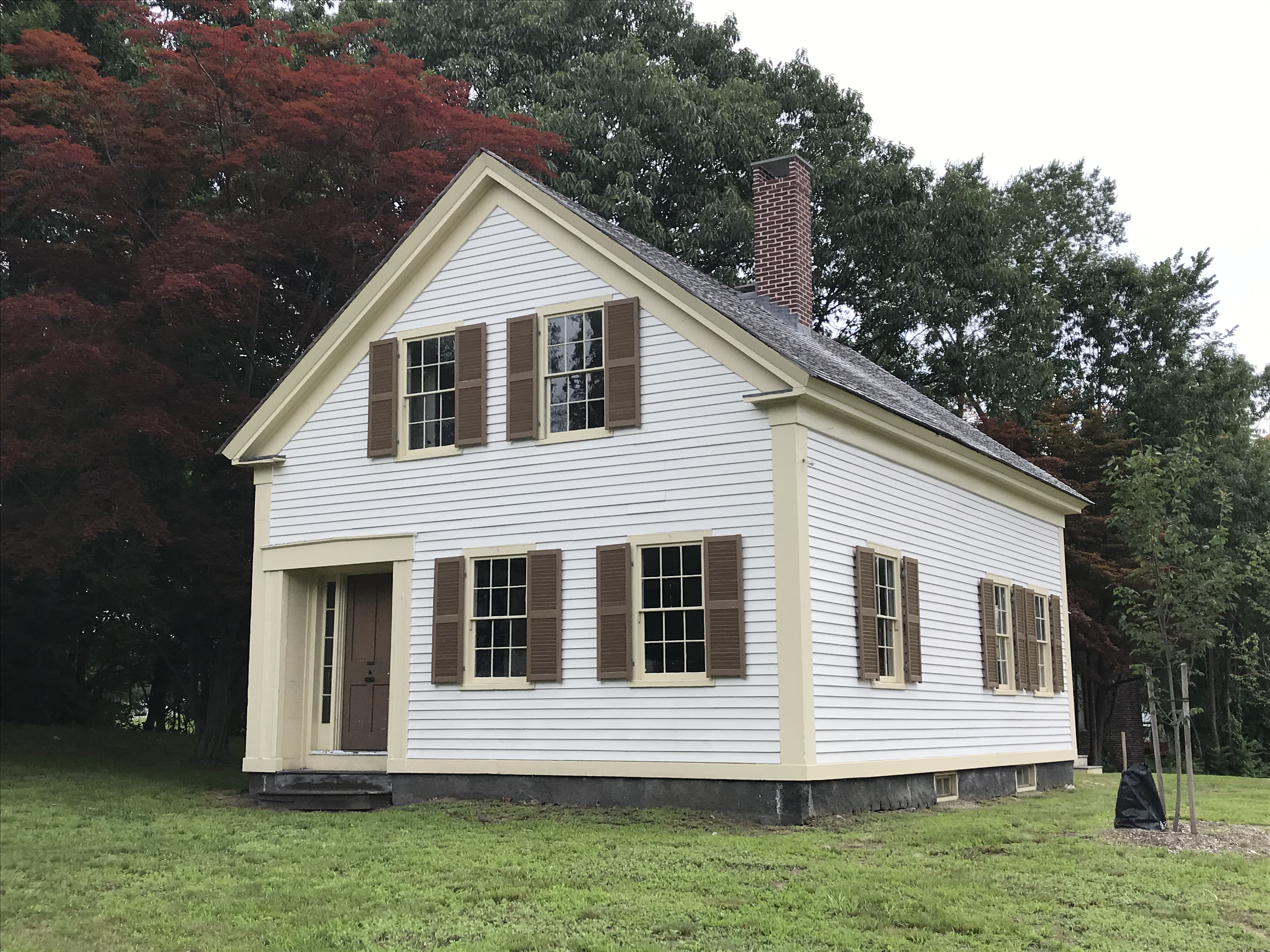
- Restored Frances H. and Jonathan Drake House

- Location within Massachusetts Location within the United States
- Location: 21 Franklin St., Leominster, Massachusetts
- Coordinates: 42°31′18″N 71°45′42″W
- Area: less than one acre
- Built: 1848
- Built by: Jonathan Drake
- Architectural style: Greek Revival
- MPS: Underground Railroad in Massachusetts MPS
- NRHP reference No.: 07001488
- Added to NRHP: January 29, 2008

The Frances H. and Jonathan Drake House is an historic house at 21 Franklin Street in Leominster, Massachusetts, United States. Built in 1848, this typical Greek Revival worker's cottage is notable as a stop on the Underground Railroad during the pre-Civil War years. Frances and Jonathan Drake are documented as having hosted Shadrach Minkins after he was successfully extracted from custody at a Boston court hearing. The house was listed on the National Register of Historic Places in 2008.

== Description and history ==
The Drake House is located southwest of downtown Leominster, on the north side of Franklin Street, on a lot that extends between the street and Monoosnoc Brook, the principal source of water power for the city's 19th-century industries. It is a 1 1/2-story wood-frame structure, with a gabled roof and clapboarded exterior. The front facade is three bays wide on the ground floor, with the entrance in the left bay. It is set in a recess with sidelight windows; the outside of the recess is framed by post and lintel moulding. The front-facing gable has frieze bands along the raking edges, and corner returns. The interior of the house retains a number of original features, while others have been restored. The most unusual feature is a trapdoor in the front parlor, which provides access to the house's full basement. This trapdoor was apparently built at the same time as the floor, and is thus an original feature created by the house builder, Jonathan Drake. A Victorian porch, probably added in the late 19th century, has been removed during restoration of the property. The house, now owned by the city, underwent a major rehabilition in the 2010s, to return it to its appearance in the 1850s.

The house was built about 1848 by Jonathan Drake, and is a fairly typical Greek Revival worker's cottage. Jonathan and his wife Frances were ardent abolitionists, and their house has been documented as a stop on the Underground Railroad. It was in particular associated with the flight of Shadrach Minkins, one of the first fugitive slaves taken after the passage of the 1850 Fugitive Slave Act. Minkins was spirited out of a Boston courtroom by abolitionist activists, and was hidden at the Drake house to avoid authorities known to be hunting him in Fitchburg. He was later spirited to Canada.

== See also ==
- National Register of Historic Places listings in Worcester County, Massachusetts
