= Lebanon Lodge No. 22 =

- U.S. National Register of Historic Places
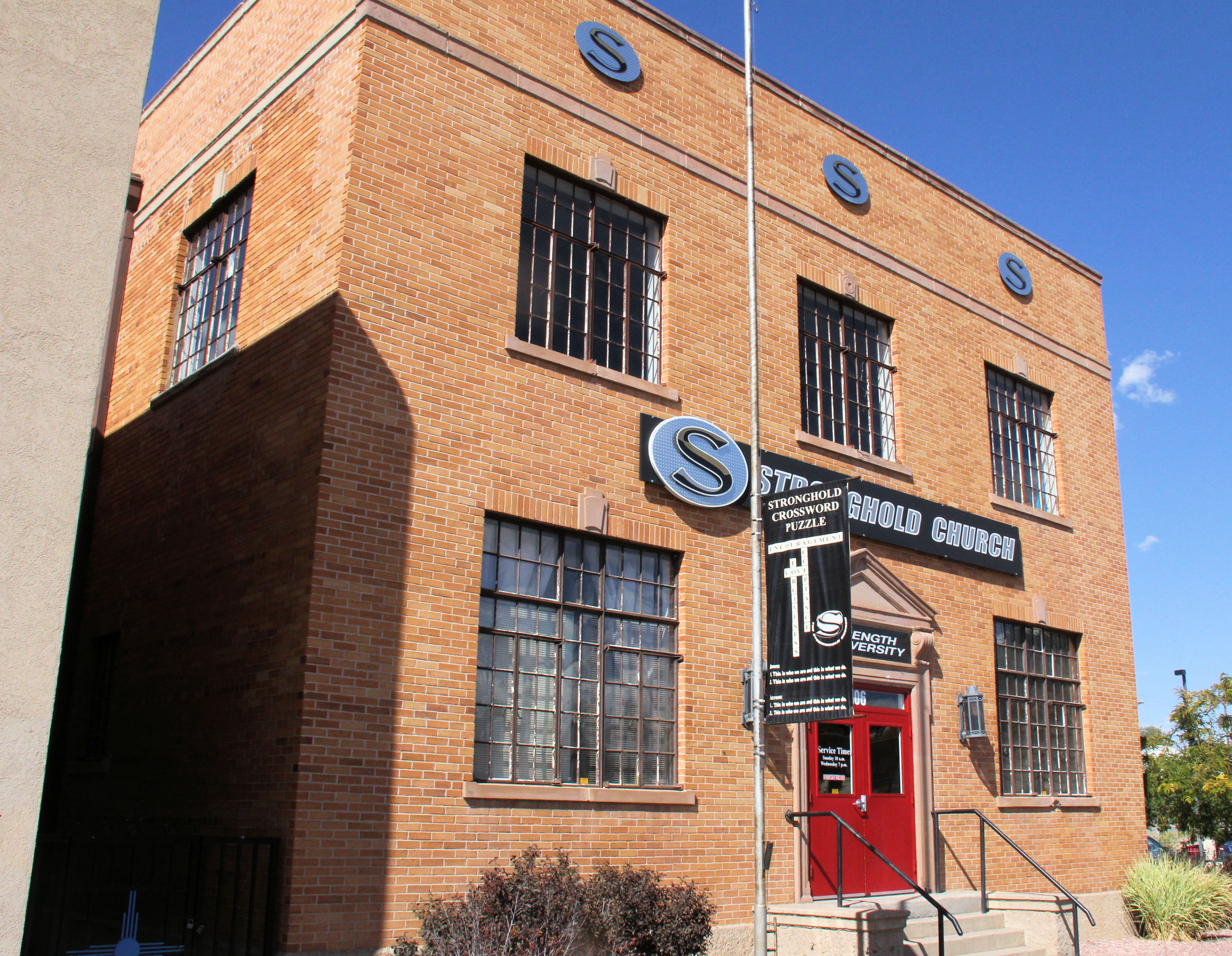
- 2012 photo

- Location within New Mexico
- Location: 106 W. Aztec, Gallup, New Mexico
- Coordinates: 35°31′36″N 108°44′26″W
- Area: less than one acre
- Built: 1932
- Architectural style: Decorative Brick Commercial
- MPS: Downtown Gallup MRA
- NRHP reference No.: 87002225
- Added to NRHP: February 14, 1989

The Lebanon Lodge No. 22, at 106 W. Aztec in Gallup, New Mexico, was built in 1932. It was listed on the National Register of Historic Places in 1989.

It is Decorative Brick Commercial in style. It was built as a Masonic lodge meeting hall.

From 2011 to 2017 it housed the Stronghold Church, and since 2017 is the offices of the Northwest New Mexico Council of Governments.
