= Harvey Hotel (Gallup, New Mexico) =

- U.S. National Register of Historic Places
- Location within New Mexico
- Location: 408 W. Coal Ave., Gallup, New Mexico
- Coordinates: 35°31′35″N 108°44′42″W
- Area: less than one acre
- Built: 1928
- Architectural style: Decorative Brick Commercial
- MPS: Downtown Gallup MRA
- NRHP reference No.: 87002219
- Added to NRHP: May 25, 1988

The Harvey Hotel in Gallup, New Mexico, at 408 W. Coal Ave., was built in 1928. It was listed on the National Register of Historic Places in 1988.

It is a two-story building with a Decorative Brick Commercial style facade and "Stone Commercial Style" walls. It competed with the Grand Hotel located one block to the east.

It was never associated with the hotel line of the Fred Harvey Company.
