= Arnold's Cove =

- Town
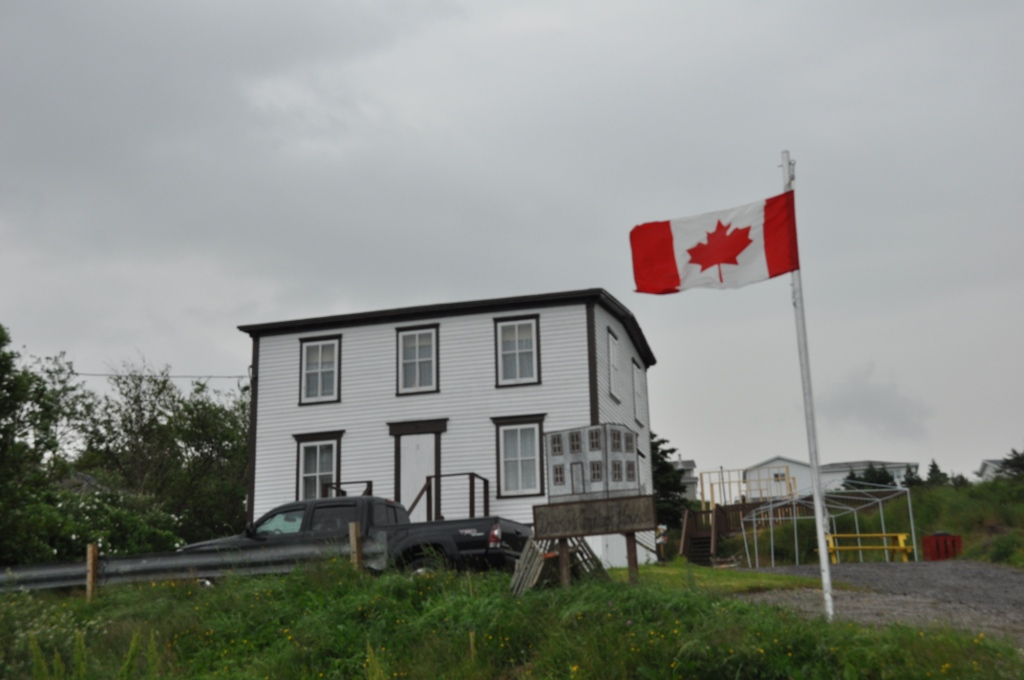
- Drake House

- Seal

- Location of Arnold's Cove in Newfoundland
- Coordinates: 47°45′42″N 53°58′57″W
- Country: Canada
- Province: Newfoundland and Labrador
- Census division: 1
- Incorporated: 1967

Government
  - Mayor: John Barrett

Area
  - Total: 4.79 km^{2} (1.85 sq mi)

Population (2021)
  - Total: 916
- Time zone: UTC-3:30 (Newfoundland Time)
  - Summer (DST): UTC-2:30 (Newfoundland Daylight)
- Area code: 709
- Highways: Route 1 (TCH)

Arnold's Cove (2021 Population 916) is a town on Newfoundland's Avalon Peninsula in the province of Newfoundland and Labrador, Canada. It is in Division 1 on Placentia Bay.

The name is found in population returns of 1836, and may have been given after the forename of a fisherman. In 1864 there was one family, and by 1893 there was a post office. It was a fishing settlement located approximately two kilometres from the Newfoundland Railway, located 35 miles from Placentia Junction.

It was a Local Improvement District in 1967 and incorporated as a town the same year. It had a population of 100 in 1911 and 1,160 in 1976. It has been a center of economic growth recently, due to its proximity to projects involved with the Hibernia offshore oil platform.

== Demographics ==
Historical populations Division No. 2, NL
Year	Pop.	±%
2001	1,024	—
2006	1,003	−2.1%
2011	990	−1.3%
2016	949	−4.1%
2021	916	−3.5%

In the 2021 Census of Population conducted by Statistics Canada, Arnold's Cove had a population of 916 living in 434 of its 547 total private dwellings, a change of −3.5% from its 2016 population of 949. With a land area of 5.25 km^{2} (2.03 sq mi), it had a population density of 183.6/km^{2} (475.6/sq mi) in 2021.

2016 census
Population change from 2011	-4.1%
Median age	51.3
Number of families	290
Number of married couples	230
Total number of dwellings	537
Land Area (km^{2}.)	4.79

	North: Subdivision 1A
West: Come By Chance	Arnold's Cove	East: Subdivision 1A
	South: Subdivision 1A

== Attractions ==
=== Hiking trails ===
Arnold's Cove is home to three hiking trails varying in length from a 12 km loop to a 2 km there-and-back. Bordeaux Trail is the longest, followed by the Old Cabot Highway to Arthur's Hill Trail with the Otter Rub/War Path Trail being the shortest of the three. All three trails are rated as Moderate or Easy/Moderate.

=== Lookout points ===
Two lookout points exist within the town of Arnold's Cove. The Placentia Bay Lookout sits at the top of a hill, providing scenic views westward over Placentia Bay. Ivy's Lookout is small, mostly unmarked, and sits right on the water of Arnold's Cove itself, also looking west. Additionally, the Big Pond Bird Sanctuary, also known as the Arnold's Cove Bird Sanctuary, offers east-facing views of a tidal inlet that is home to local waterfowl.

=== Historic buildings ===
The Drake House is a home built in 1890 by George and John Drake in a standard Georgian style. It was awarded Heritage Designation by the Heritage Foundation of Newfoundland and Labrador in 2003.

=== Religious buildings and cemeteries ===
Modern Arnold's Cove has four churches and no other listed religious buildings. It also has three cemeteries, two affiliated with the Anglican Church and one with the Salvation Army Church.

== See also ==
- List of cities and towns in Newfoundland and Labrador
