= HMS Drake (1694) =

History

England
- Name: HMS Drake
- Ordered: 2 May 1694
- Builder: George Fowler, Rotherhithe
- Launched: 26 September 1694
- Commissioned: 26 September 1694
- Fate: Lost with all hands on 20 December 1694

General characteristics
- Type: 20-gun Sixth Rate
- Tons burthen: 253 6/94 bm
- Length: 93 ft 0 in (28.3 m) gundeck; 77 ft 8 in (23.7 m) keel for tonnage
- Beam: 24 ft 9 in (7.5 m) for tonnage
- Depth of hold: 10 ft 8 in (3.3 m)
- Armament: initially as ordered; 20 × sakers on wooden trucks (UD); 4 × 3-pdr on wooden trucks (QD); 1703 Establishment; 20 × 6-pdrs on wooden trucks (UD); 4 × 4-pdr on wooden trucks (QD)

HMS Drake was a member of the standardized 20-gun sixth rates built at the end of the 17th century. After commissioning, she was lost within three months on the Irish Coast in a storm on 20 December 1694.

She was the second vessel to be named Drake. The first was a 16-gun vessel launched at Deptford in 1653 and sold at Jamaica in 1691.

== Construction ==
She was ordered in the Second Batch of eight ships to be built under contract from George Fowler of Rotherhithe. She was launched on 26 September 1694.

== Commissioned service ==
She was commissioned on 26 September 1694 under the command of Captain John Stapleton, RN.

== Loss ==
HMS Drake was wrecked with the loss of all hands on the Irish Coast in a storm on 20 December 1694.
