= HMS Drake =

Nineteen ships and a shore establishment of the Royal Navy have been named HMS Drake after Sir Francis Drake or after the drake:

- Drake was a 16-gun sixth rate launched in 1653 and sold in 1691.
- HMS Drake (1694) was a 24-gun sixth rate launched in 1694 and wrecked later that year.
- HMS Drake (1705 yacht) was a 2-gun yacht launched in 1705. She was rebuilt in 1727 and was sold in 1749.
- HMS Drake (1705 sloop) was a 14-gun sloop launched in 1705, rebuilt in 1729 and broken up in 1740.
- HMS Drake (1736) was a 14-gun sloop launched in 1736, converted into a bomb vessel in 1748 and sold in 1755.
- HMS Drake (1741) was a 14-gun sloop launched in 1741 and wrecked in 1742. The wreck was sold in 1748.
- HMS Drake (1743) was a 14-gun sloop launched in 1743 and sold in 1748.
- HMS Drake (1770) was a 12-gun sloop launched as the civilian Marquis of Granby. She was purchased in 1770 and briefly named HMS Drake. She was renamed HMS Resolution in 1771 and served James Cook on his second and third voyages of discovery in the Pacific. She was captured in 1782 by the French ship Sphinx. In July 1782 the French sent her to Manila. In 1789 she may have been renamed Général Conway, in November 1790 Amis Réunis, and in 1792 Liberté.
- HMS Drake (1777) was a 14-gun sloop launched as the civilian Resolution. She was purchased in 1777 and captured in 1778 by the American sloop USS Ranger.
- HMS Drake (1779) was a 14-gun brig-sloop launched in 1779 and condemned in 1800.
- HMS Drake (1798) was a 14-gun brig-sloop, formerly the French privateer Tigre. She was captured in 1798 by HMS Melpomene and wrecked in 1804.
- HMS Drake (1804) was a 16-gun sloop, launched in 1799 for the East India Company as the civilian Earl of Mornington. She was purchased in 1804 and broken up in 1808.
- HMS Drake (1808) was a 10-gun Cherokee-class brig-sloop launched in 1808 and wrecked in 1822.
- HMS Drake (1834) was a mortar vessel launched in 1834 as a dockyard lighter and converted in 1854. She was renamed MV 1 in 1855, followed by HMS Sheppey after being returned to a lighter in 1856. She was broken up in 1867.
- HMS Drake (1856) was a Clown-class gunboat launched in 1856 and sold in 1859.
- HMS Drake (1870) was a cutter, formerly named YC 1 and acquired and renamed in 1870. She had previously been HMS Hart. She was broken up in 1875.
- HMS Drake (1888) was a Forester-class composite screw gunboat launched in 1875 as HMS Sheldrake. She was renamed HMS Drake when she became a training ship in 1888. She was renamed WV 29 in 1893, and was renamed HMS Drake in 1906 before being sold later that year.
- HMS Drake (1901) was a Drake-class armoured cruiser launched in 1901 and sunk in 1917.
- HMS Drake (1934) was previously the Marshal Ney-class monitor HMS Marshal Ney. She was launched in 1915, became a base ship and was renamed HMS Vivid in 1922, HMS Drake in 1934 and HMS Alaunia II in 1947. She was broken up in 1957.
- HMS Drake (shore establishment) is the name now given to much of HMNB Devonport. From 1934 to the early 21st century, it referred only to the naval barracks within the base.
