= Cousins Bros. Trading Post =

- U.S. National Register of Historic Places
- Location within New Mexico
- Location: 768 A-D Cousins Rd., near Chi Chil Tah, New Mexico
- Coordinates: 35°15′04″N 108°53′42″W
- Area: less than one acre
- Built: 1930
- NRHP reference No.: 06000153
- Added to NRHP: March 22, 2006

The Cousins Bros. Trading Post, near Chi Chil Tah, New Mexico, was built in 1930. It was listed on the National Register of Historic Places in 2006.

Also known as the Cousins Bros. Trading Company, the building is about 30 by 49 feet (9.1 m × 14.9 m) in plan, and was expanded or modified in 1940, 1942, and 1952. It is made of stone, concrete, and adobe. Its east-facing front has a gradually stepped parapet and a centered entrance.
