= C.N. Cotton Warehouse =

- C. N. Cotton Warehouse
- U.S. National Register of Historic Places
- Location within New Mexico
- Location: 101 N. Third St., Gallup, New Mexico
- Coordinates: 35°31′40″N 108°44′41″W
- Area: 1.5 acres (0.61 ha)
- Built: c.1880
- Architectural style: New Mexico vernacular adobe
- MPS: Downtown Gallup MRA
- NRHP reference No.: 87002226
- Added to NRHP: January 14, 1988

The C. N. Cotton Warehouse, at 101 N. Third Street in Gallup, New Mexico, United States, is a structure built around 1880. It has also been known as Associated Grocers. It was listed on the National Register of Historic Places in 1988.

== History ==
It was deemed significant as one of few New Mexico vernacular adobe buildings surviving in downtown Gallup, and for its association with businessman C.N. Cotton, who built up the Navajo weaving industry. Cotton arrived in Gallup in the 1880s and worked as a telegraph operator. He opened a wholesale Indian trading company in 1884 and was the first Indian trade to develop a significant market for Navaho blankets in the east, including publishing an illustrated catalog of Navajo blankets. His "splendid Territorial Style adobe home", built about 1890 at 406 W. Aztec in Gallup, was listed on the National Register, but was demolished in 1984 and was delisted.

The building originally had "an adobe storefront-like facade, with steps leading up to the entry porch". It has a large statue of local Navajo leader Manuelito over its entrance, placed there by Cotton. The current facade, as modified in 1963, is brick laid in running bond and obscures the original facade except for the statue. The original door and porch were replaced by a small warehouse door and a concrete landing.
