= Hattie O. and Henry Drake Octagon House =

Historic house in South Dakota, United States

- U.S. National Register of Historic Places
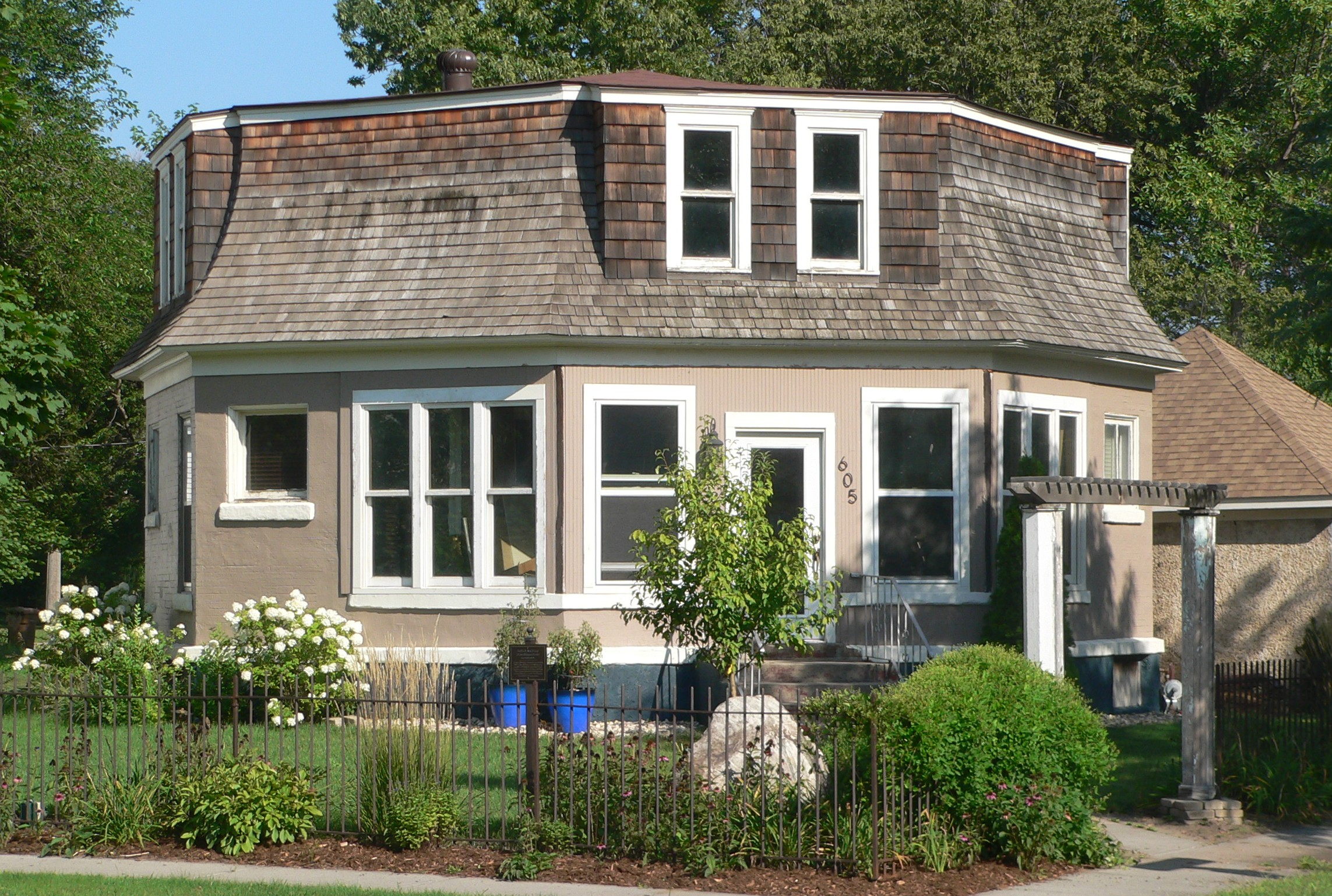

- Location within South Dakota Location within the United States
- Location: 605 3rd Street, SW, Huron, South Dakota
- Coordinates: 44.363611°N 98.223889°W
- Built: c. 1893
- NRHP reference No.: 91002045
- Added to NRHP: January 30, 1992

The Hattie O. and Henry Drake Octagon House, built c. 1893, is an octagonal house located at 605 3rd Street, South West, in Huron, South Dakota. The home's most unusual feature may be its mansard roof.

On January 30, 1992, it was added to the National Register of Historic Places.
