= Elam Drake House =

Historic house in Ohio, United States

- U.S. National Register of Historic Places
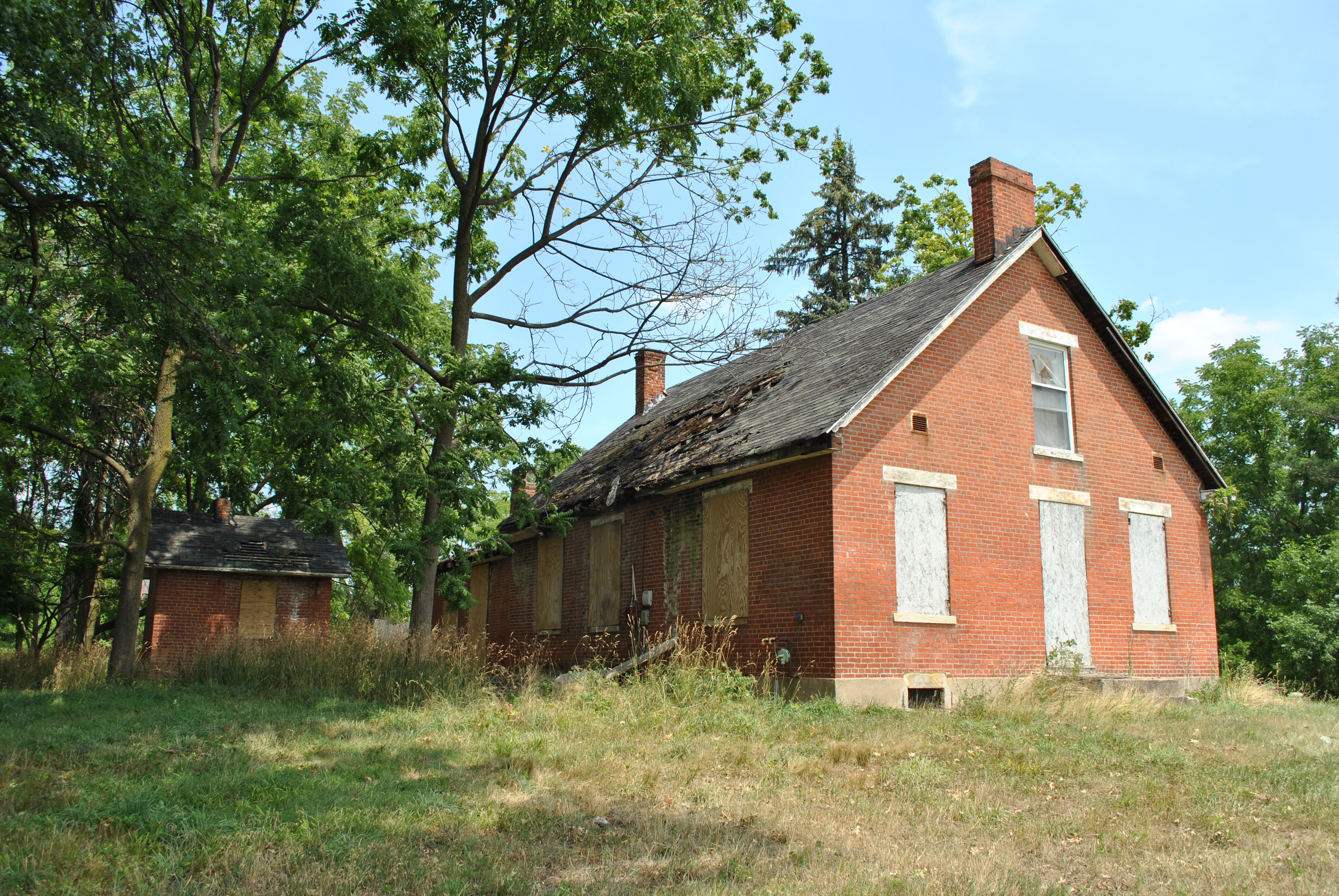
- Interactive map highlighting the building's former location
- Location: 2738 Ole Country Lane, Columbus, Ohio
- Coordinates: 40.003901°N 82.920366°W
- Built: 1856
- Demolished: 2022
- NRHP reference No.: 78002064
- Added to NRHP: April 6, 1978

The Elam Drake House was a historic house in Columbus, Ohio, United States. The house was listed on the National Register of Historic Places in 1978. The two-story brick building was constructed in 1856. It featured a one-story north end, built in 1856, with a 1.5-story addition to the south, built between 1856 and 1857. The farmstead, including a barn, summer kitchen, and smoke house, was built by a Elam Drake, a former brick layer and plasterer who constructed many of the city's earliest buildings and later retired to take up farming in 1856. The site stood as an example of farmstead structures typical of the 19th century.

The house was listed for four years in a row as one of Columbus's most endangered historic buildings, as recorded by the Columbus Landmarks Foundation. The site, owned by the Columbus Regional Airport Authority, had been at risk for demolition to expand the John Glenn Columbus International Airport. In 2022, the house and surrounding structures were torn down to make way for a new development.

== See also ==
- National Register of Historic Places listings in Columbus, Ohio
