= Harbour Buffett, Newfoundland and Labrador =

Human settlement in Newfoundland and Labrador, Canada

Coordinates: 47.533°N 54.100°W

Harbour Buffett was established in 1836. It was a small place with ten families in the Placentia Bay Newfoundland and Labrador area by 1864. The Way Station became a Post Office in 1891.

Harbour Buffett, located on the southeastern side of Long Island in inner Placentia Bay, has a deep, sheltered harbour. It recorded a population of 266 (down from the previous census figure of 285) in 1966, shortly before being abandoned in 1967 as part of the Resettlement program. Both Harbour Buffett itself and its smaller sub-settlement Northeast Arm Harbour Buffett were evacuated, along with the smaller still population at Whiffin's Cove, leaving the harbour empty. Reunions in summer are frequent, as at Merasheen on the island of the same name.

== See also ==
- List of ghost towns in Newfoundland and Labrador
