= White Cafe =

- U.S. National Register of Historic Places
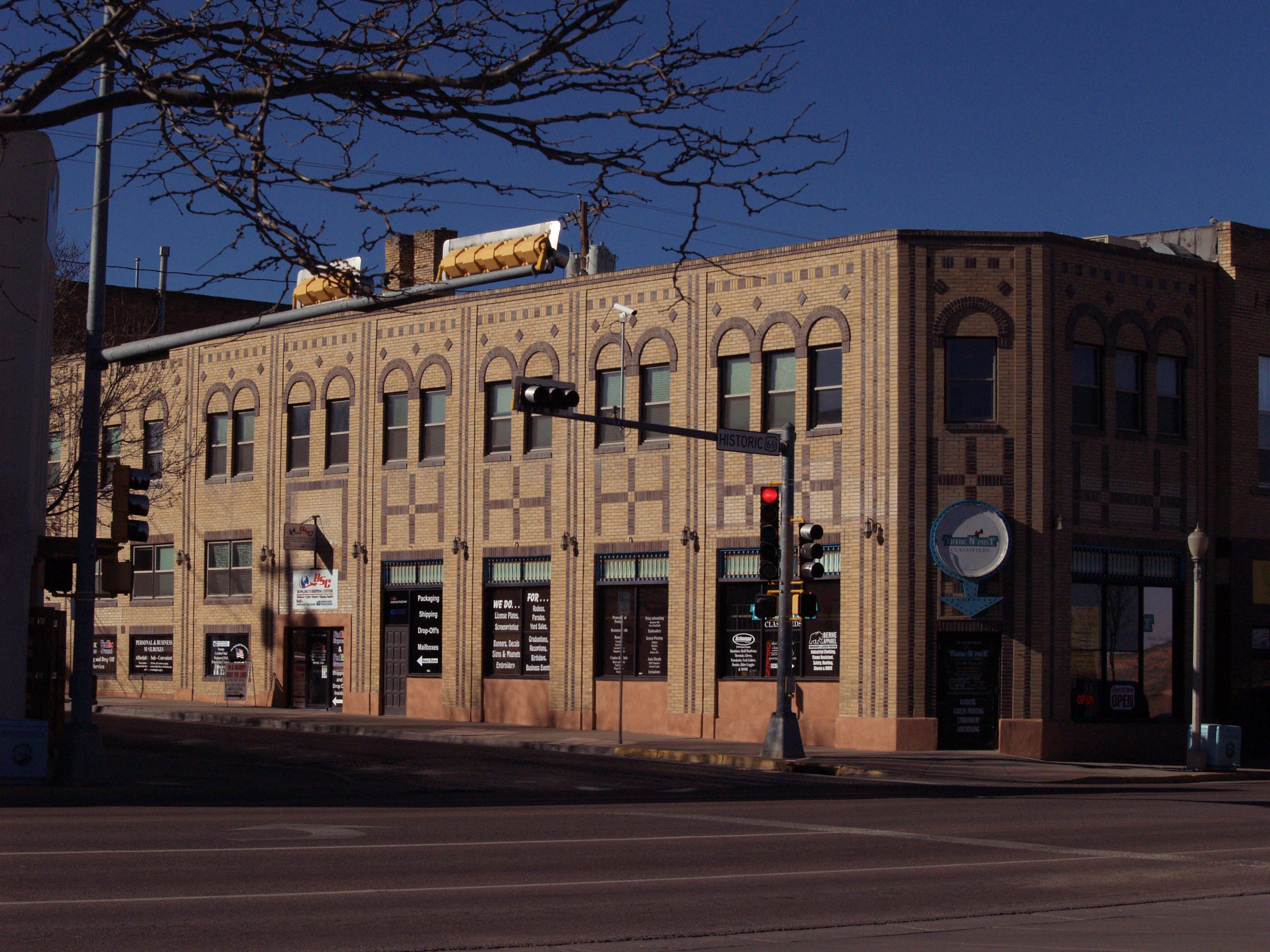

- Location within New Mexico
- Location: 100 W. Sixth-sixth Ave., Gallup, New Mexico
- Coordinates: 35°31′41″N 108°44′27″W
- Area: less than one acre
- Built: 1928
- Architectural style: Decorative Brick Commercial
- MPS: Downtown Gallup MRA
- NRHP reference No.: 87002212
- Added to NRHP: January 14, 1988

The White Cafe, at 100 W. Sixth-sixth Ave. in Gallup, New Mexico, was built in 1928. It was listed on the National Register of Historic Places in 1988.

It is Decorative Brick Commercial in style.
