= Spencers Cove, Newfoundland and Labrador =

Settlement in Newfoundland and Labrador

Coordinates: 47.659°N 54.074°W

Location of Spencers Cove in Newfoundland and Labrador

Spencers Cove is a settlement in the Canadian province of Newfoundland and Labrador.
