= Dr. Franklin Hart Farm =

Historic farm in North Carolina, United States

- U.S. National Register of Historic Places
- U.S. Historic district
- Location within North Carolina Location within the United States
- Location: NC 48, near Drake, North Carolina
- Coordinates: 36°2′3″N 77°48′16″W
- Area: 632 acres (256 ha)
- Built: 1779
- Architectural style: Greek Revival, Vernacular I-house
- NRHP reference No.: 88001050
- Added to NRHP: July 21, 1988

Dr. Franklin Hart Farm, also known as Hidden Path, is a historic home and farm and national historic district located near Drake, Nash County, North Carolina. It includes a collection of well-preserved mid-19th to early-20th century dwellings and farm outbuildings. The main house was built about 1845, and is a two-story, three-bay, single pile I-house with Federal / Greek Revival style design elements. The front facade features a two-tier portico carried by massive, unusual turned and banded columns. Also on the property are the contributing detached kitchen building (c. 1845), smokehouse, seven tobacco barns, corn crib, mule barn, packhouse, and seven tenant houses. The Hart family owned and farmed the land from about 1770 until 1979.

It was listed on the National Register of Historic Places in 1988.
