= United States Post Office (Gallup, New Mexico) =

- U.S. Post Office
- U.S. National Register of Historic Places
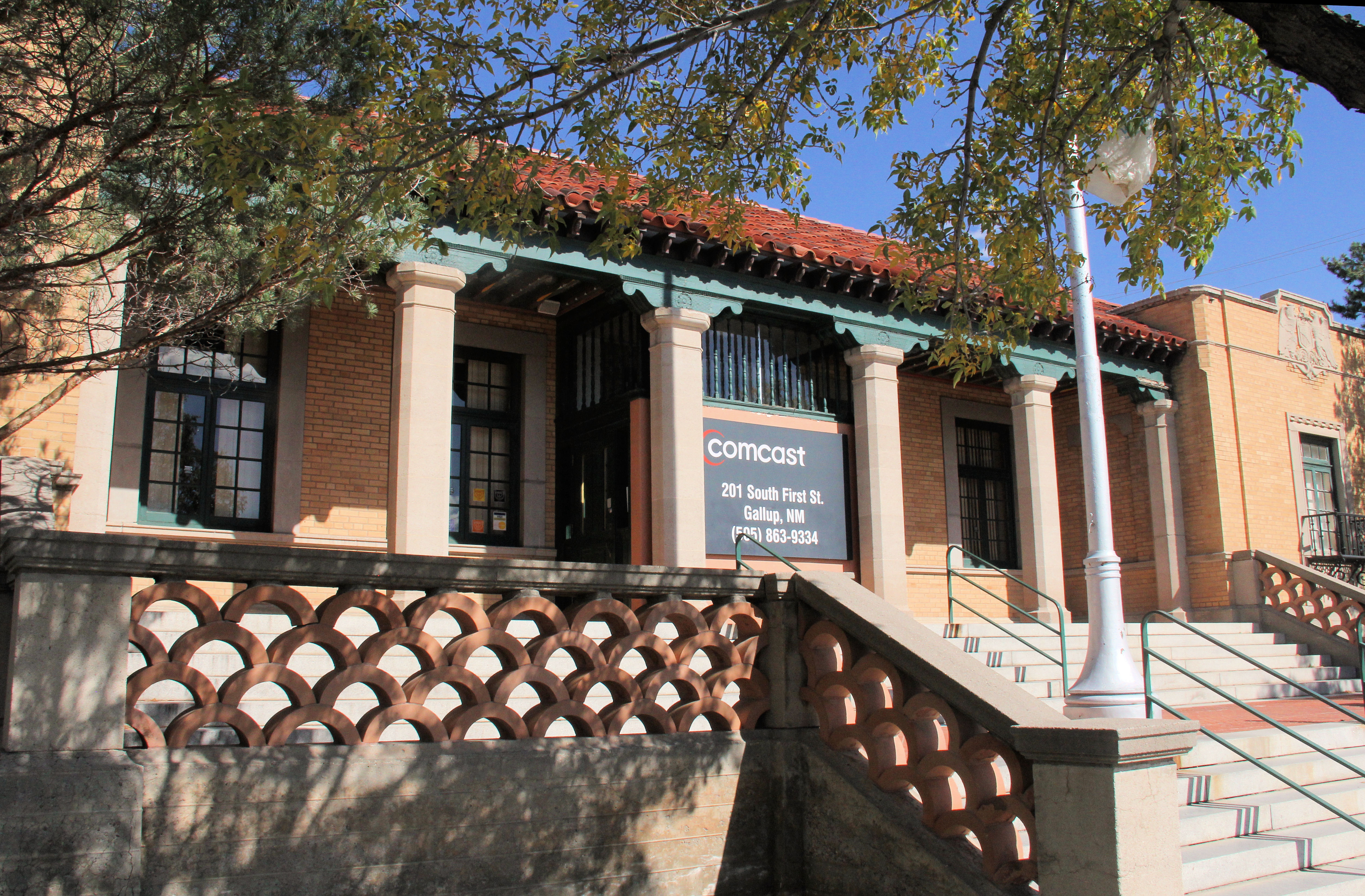

- Location within New Mexico
- Location: 201 S. First Street, Gallup, New Mexico
- Coordinates: 35°31′39″N 108°44′25″W
- Built: 1933
- Architect: James A. Wetmore
- Architectural style: Late 19th and 20th Century Revivals, Mission/Spanish Revival, Mediterranean
- MPS: Downtown Gallup MRA
- NRHP reference No.: 87002228
- Added to NRHP: May 25, 1988

The U.S. Post Office at 201 South First Street in Gallup, New Mexico was built in 1933. It was listed on the National Register of Historic Places in 1988.

The structure was designed as a combination of the Mediterranean and Spanish Pueblo Revival architectural styles.
