= Drake Hotel (Gallup, New Mexico) =

- U.S. National Register of Historic Places
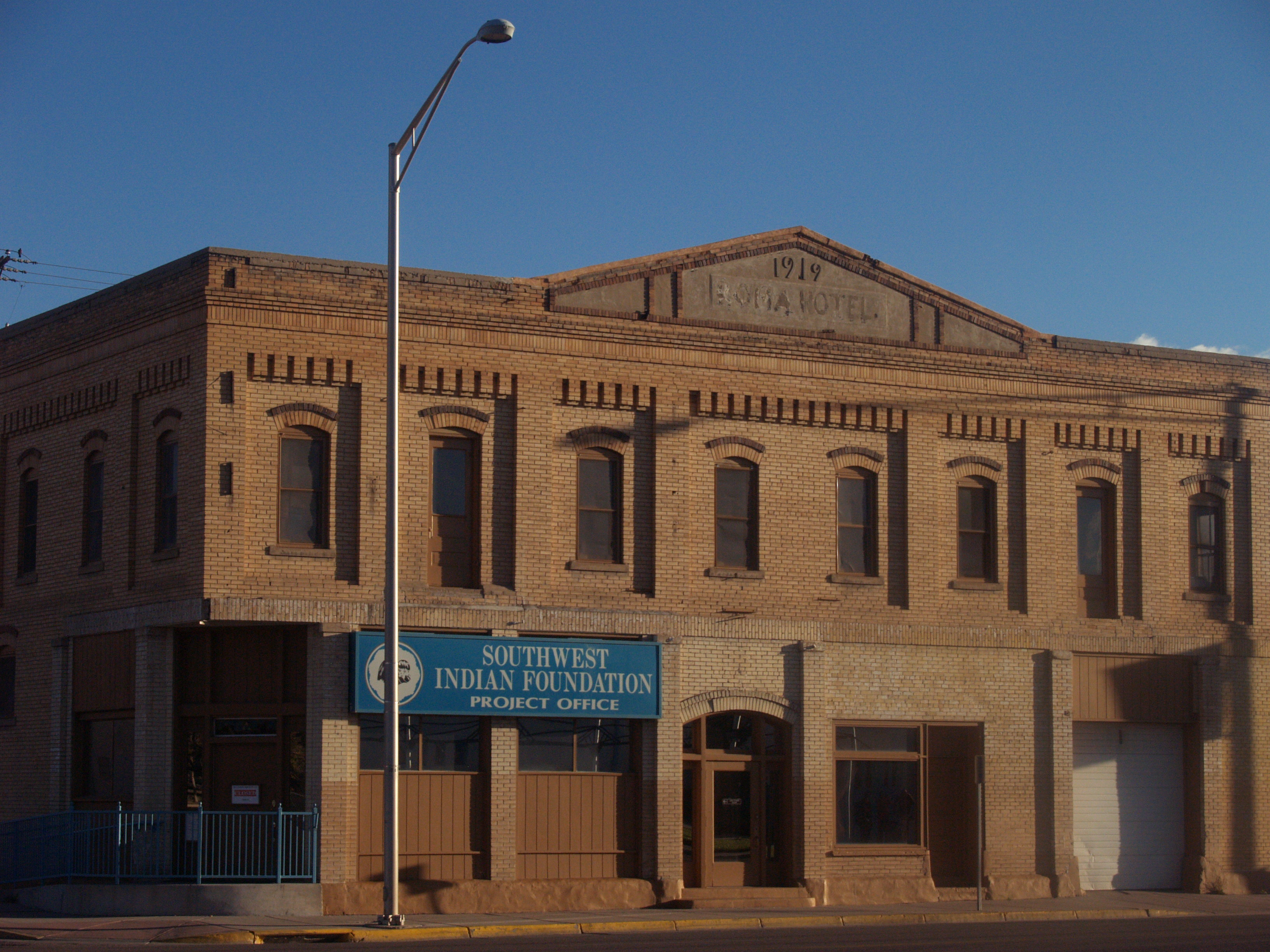

- Location within New Mexico
- Location: 216 E. Sixty-sixth Ave., Gallup, New Mexico
- Coordinates: 35°31′43″N 108°44′19″W
- Area: less than one acre
- Built: 1919
- Architectural style: Decorative Brick Commercial
- MPS: Downtown Gallup MRA
- NRHP reference No.: 87002218
- Added to NRHP: January 14, 1988

The Drake Hotel, at 216 E. Sixty-sixth Ave. in Gallup, New Mexico, was built in 1919. It was listed on the National Register of Historic Places in 1988.

It has been described as "Decorative Brick Commercial" in style and has also been known as the Turquoise Club. It is a two-story blond brick building.
