= Rex Hotel (Gallup, New Mexico) =

- U.S. National Register of Historic Places
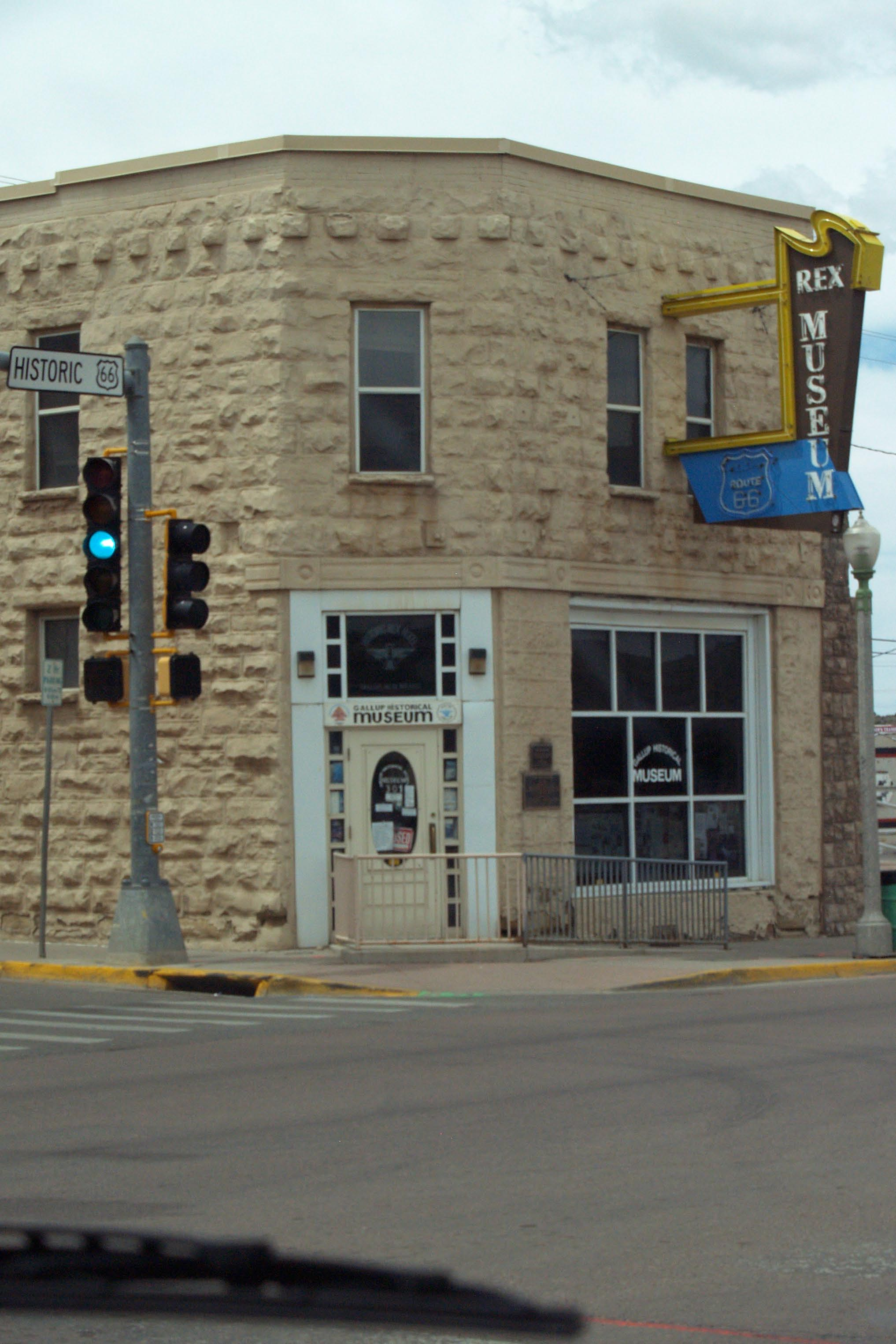
- Location: 300 W. 66th, Gallup, New Mexico
- Coordinates: 35°31′38″N 108°44′37″W
- Area: less than one acre
- Built: 1910
- Architectural style: Stone Commercial
- MPS: Downtown Gallup MRA
- NRHP reference No.: 87002215
- Added to NRHP: January 14, 1988

The Rex Hotel in Gallup, New Mexico, United States at 300 W. Sixty-sixth, was built in 1910. It was listed on the National Register of Historic Places in 1988.

It is a stone commercial building at the corner of 3rd St. and 66th Avenue. When listed, it was under threat of demolition.
