= Manuelito, New Mexico =

Census-designated place in McKinley County, New Mexico, United States

Manuelito, New Mexico Kin Hózhóní (Navajo)
- Census-designated place
- Location within New Mexico Location within the United States
- Coordinates: 35°26′16″N 108°59′55″W
- Country: United States
- State: New Mexico
- County: McKinley

Area
  - Total: 8.17 sq mi (21.15 km^{2})
  - Land: 8.17 sq mi (21.15 km^{2})
  - Water: 0 sq mi (0.00 km^{2})
- Elevation: 6,319 ft (1,926 m)

Population (2020)
  - Total: 68
  - Density: 8.3/sq mi (3.22/km^{2})
- Time zone: UTC-7 (Mountain (MST))
  - Summer (DST): UTC-6 (MDT)
- ZIP Code: 87319 (Mentmore)
- Area code: 505
- FIPS code: 35-46660
- GNIS feature ID: 2813407

Manuelito (Navajo: Kin Hózhóní) is an unincorporated community and census-designated place (CDP) on the Navajo Nation in McKinley County, New Mexico, United States. As of the 2020 census, it had a population of 68.

== Geography ==
The community is in the western part of McKinley County in the valley of the Puerco River, 16 miles (26 km) southwest of Gallup, the county seat, and 3 miles (5 km) east of the Arizona border. New Mexico State Road 118 (Historic Route 66) and Interstate 40 pass through the community. The closest I-40 access is from Exit 8 (NM 118), 3 miles (5 km) to the northeast.

According to the U.S. Census Bureau, the Manuelito CDP has an area of 8.17 square miles (21.16 km^{2}), all of it recorded as land. The Puerco River crosses the southeastern part of the community, on its way to join the Little Colorado River in Holbrook, Arizona, 78 miles (126 km) to the southwest.

== Demographics ==
Historical population
Census	Pop.	Note	%±
2020	68		—
U.S. Decennial Census

Manuelito was first listed as a CDP prior to the 2020 census.

== Education ==
The community is within the Gallup-McKinley County Public Schools.

Zoned schools are: Tobe Turpen Elementary School, Chief Manualito Middle School, and Gallup High School.

== See also ==
- List of census-designated places in New Mexico
