= Drakes Creek (Arkansas) =

Stream in Arkansas, U.S.

Coordinates: 36.0128559°N 93.8815845°W

Drakes Creek is a stream in the U.S. state of Arkansas. It is a tributary to Lollars Creek.

Drakes Creek has the name of a local family of pioneers.
