= Grand Hotel (Gallup, New Mexico) =

- U.S. National Register of Historic Places
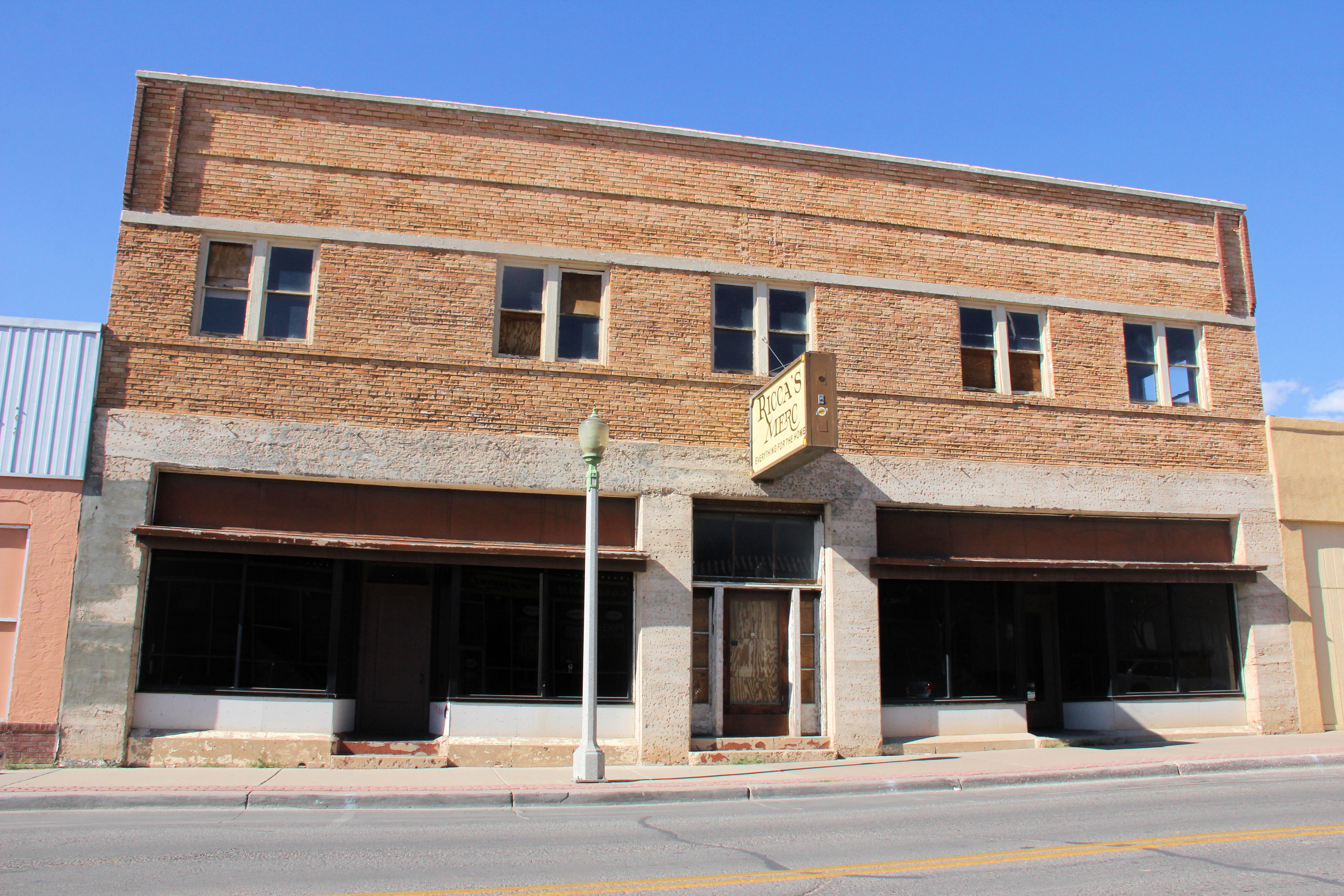

- Location within New Mexico
- Location: 306 W. Coal Ave., Gallup, New Mexico
- Coordinates: 35°31′36″N 108°44′38″W
- Area: less than one acre
- Built: 1925
- Architectural style: Decorative Brick Commercial
- MPS: Downtown Gallup MRA
- NRHP reference No.: 87002217
- Added to NRHP: May 25, 1988

The Grand Hotel, at 306 W. Coal Ave. in Gallup, New Mexico, was built in 1925. It was listed on the National Register of Historic Places in 1988.

It is a two-story "Decorative Brick Commercial" building.

It competed with the Harvey Hotel one block to the west.

The hotel went out of business around 1980, and it has also operated as "Ricca's Mercantile", a store.
