= Chief Theater (Gallup, New Mexico) =

- U.S. National Register of Historic Places
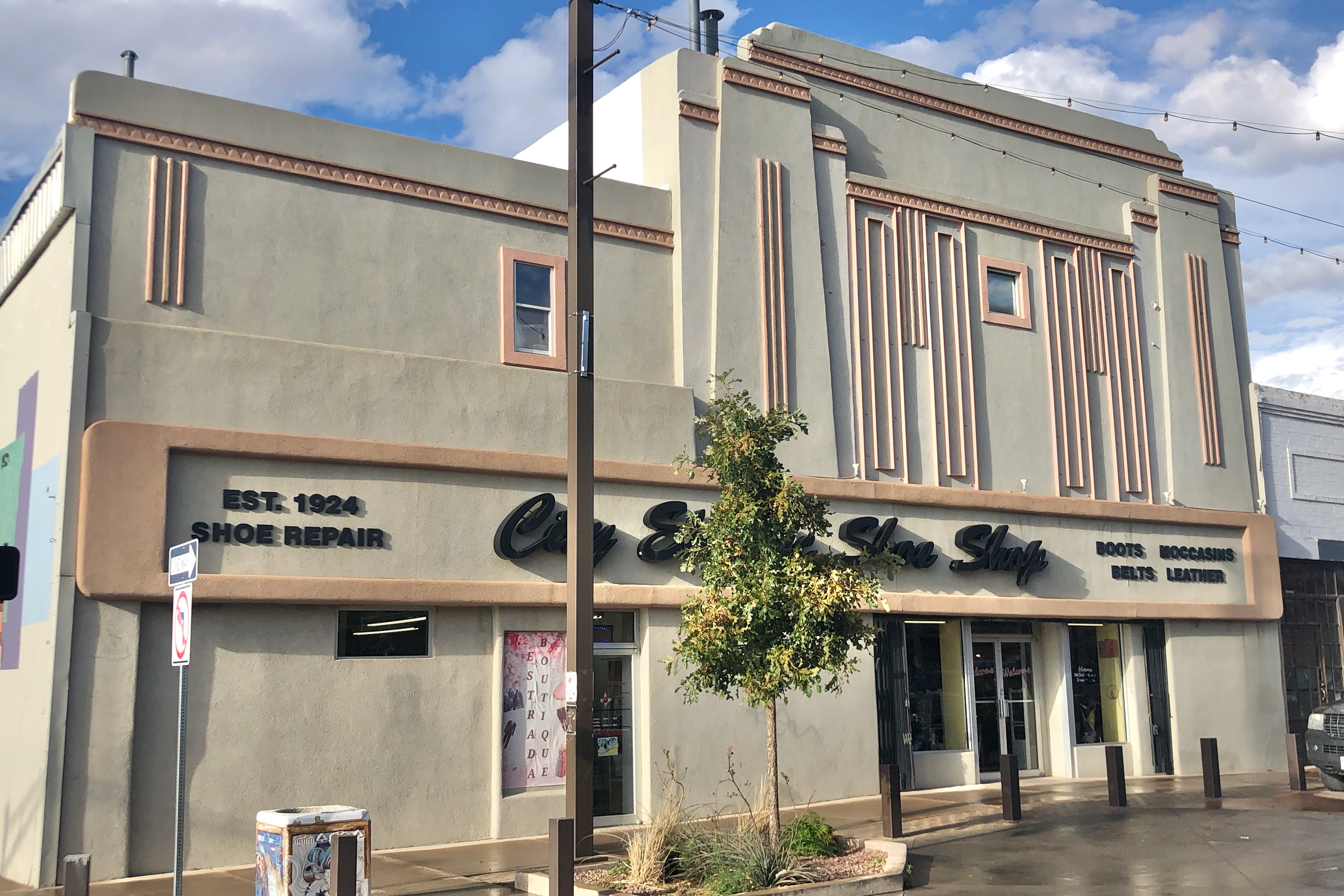

- Location within New Mexico
- Location: 230 W. Coal Ave., Gallup, New Mexico
- Coordinates: 35°31′37″N 108°44′37″W
- Area: less than one acre
- Built: 1920
- Architectural style: Art Deco, Pueblo Deco
- MPS: Downtown Gallup MRA
- NRHP reference No.: 87002223
- Added to NRHP: May 16, 1988

The Chief Theater in Gallup, New Mexico is an Art Deco-style theatre built in 1920. It was listed on the National Register of Historic Places in 1988. It was then occupied by the City Electric Shoe Shop.

More specifically, the style of its facade is a Southwest regional Art Deco substyle, regionally referred to as Pueblo Deco.
