= Palace Hotel (Gallup, New Mexico) =

- U.S. National Register of Historic Places
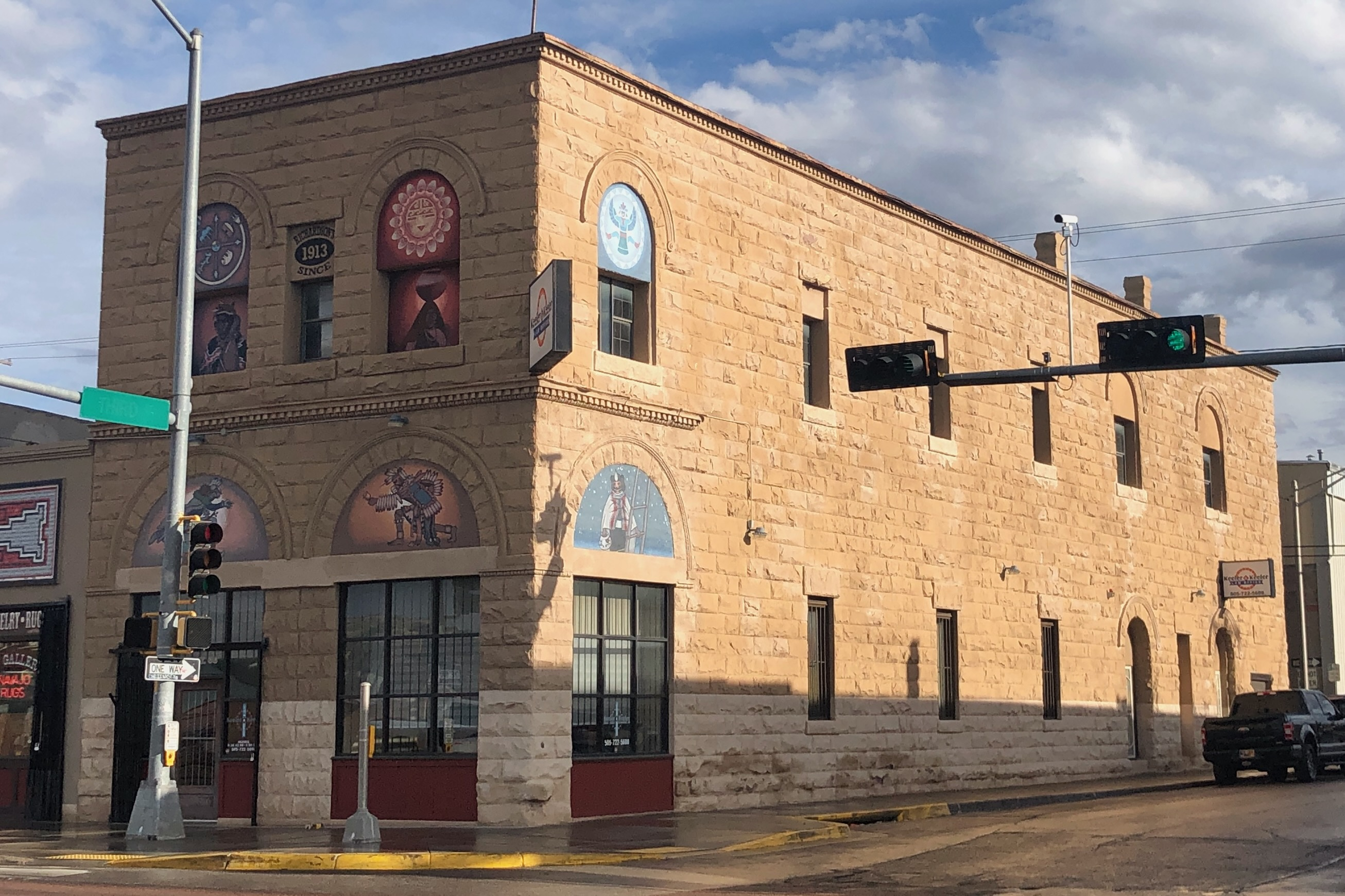
- Palace Hotel in 2025

- Location within New Mexico
- Location: 235 W. Route 66; Gallup, New Mexico
- Coordinates: 35°31′39″N 108°44′36″W
- Area: less than one acre
- Built: 1912
- Architectural style: Romanesque, Richardsonian Romanesqque
- MPS: Downtown Gallup MRA
- NRHP reference No.: 87002216
- Added to NRHP: May 16, 1988

The Palace Hotel in Gallup, New Mexico, at 235 W. Route 66, was built in 1912. It was listed on the National Register of Historic Places in 1988.

It has also been known as the Palace Lodge.

It is a two-story hipped roof building which is Richardsonian Romanesque in style, the only building of that style in Gallup.
