= List of casinos in New Mexico =

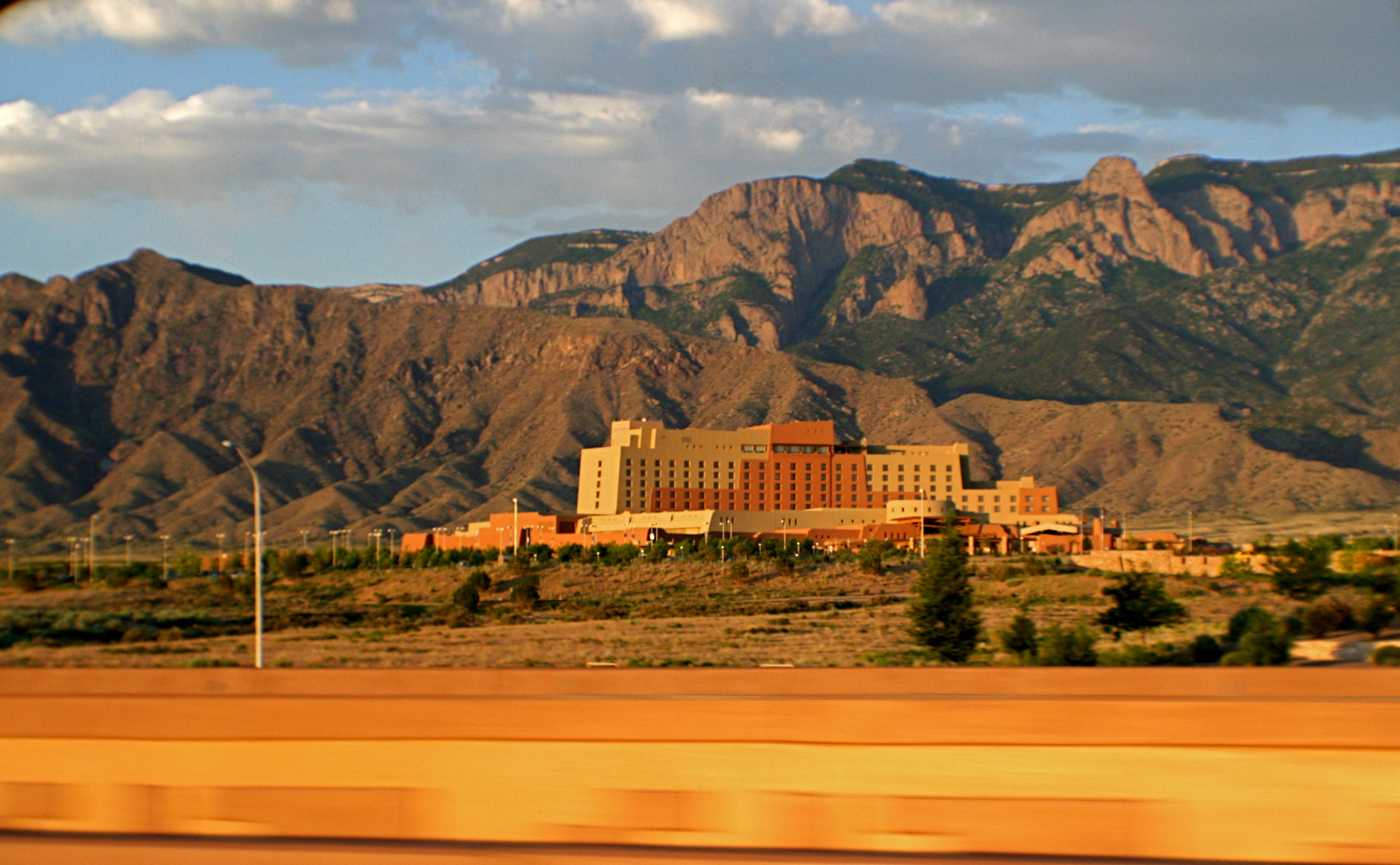
Sandia Resort and Casino

This is a list of casinos in New Mexico.

== List of casinos ==
List of casinos in the U.S. state of New Mexico
Casino	City	County	State	District	Type	Comments
Apache Nugget Casino	Cuba	Sandoval	New Mexico		Native American
Billy the Kid Casino	Ruidoso	Lincoln	New Mexico		Racino	Also known as Ruidoso Downs Race Track & Casino
Buffalo Thunder Casino and Resort	Pojoaque Pueblo	Santa Fe	New Mexico		Native American	north of Santa Fe
Tesuque Casino	Tesuque Pueblo	Santa Fe	New Mexico		Native American	north of Santa Fe
Casino Apache Travel Center	Mescalero	Otero	New Mexico		Native American
Casino Hollywood	San Felipe	Sandoval	New Mexico		Native American
Cities of Gold Casino	Pojoaque Pueblo	Santa Fe	New Mexico		Native American	north of Santa Fe
Dancing Eagle Casino	Casa Blanca	Cibola	New Mexico		Native American
Downs at Albuquerque	Albuquerque	Bernalillo	New Mexico		Racino
Fire Rock Navajo Casino	Church Rock	McKinley	New Mexico		Native American
Inn of the Mountain Gods Resort & Casino	Mescalero	Otero	New Mexico		Native American
Isleta Resort & Casino	Isleta Pueblo	Bernalillo	New Mexico		Native American	south of Albuquerque
Kicks 66/Convenience Store & Phillips 66 Service	Santa Fe	Santa Fe	New Mexico		Native American
Northern Edge Navajo Casino	Fruitland	San Juan	New Mexico		Native American
Ohkay Casino Resort	San Juan Pueblo	Rio Arriba	New Mexico		Native American	Ohkay Owingeh Pueblo
Palace West	Isleta	Bernalillo	New Mexico		Native American
Route 66 Casino	Laguna Pueblo	Bernalillo	New Mexico		Native American	west of Albuquerque
Route 66 Casino Express	Laguna Pueblo	Bernalillo	New Mexico		Native American	west of Albuquerque; features 120 slots only
Sandia Resort and Casino	Sandia Pueblo	Bernalillo	New Mexico		Native American	north of Albuquerque
Santa Ana Star Casino	Santa Ana Pueblo	Sandoval	New Mexico		Native American	northwest of Albuquerque/Rio Rancho
Santa Claran Hotel & Casino	Española	Rio Arriba	New Mexico		Native American
Sky City Casino	Acoma	Cibola	New Mexico		Native American
Sun Ray Park & Casino	Farmington	San Juan	New Mexico		Racino
Sunland Park Racetrack & Casino	Sunland Park	Doña Ana	New Mexico		Racino
Taos Mountain Casino	Taos	Taos	New Mexico		Native American
Wild Horse Casino	Dulce	Rio Arriba	New Mexico		Native American
Zia Park Casino, Hotel & Racetrack	Hobbs	Lea	New Mexico		Racino

== Gallery ==
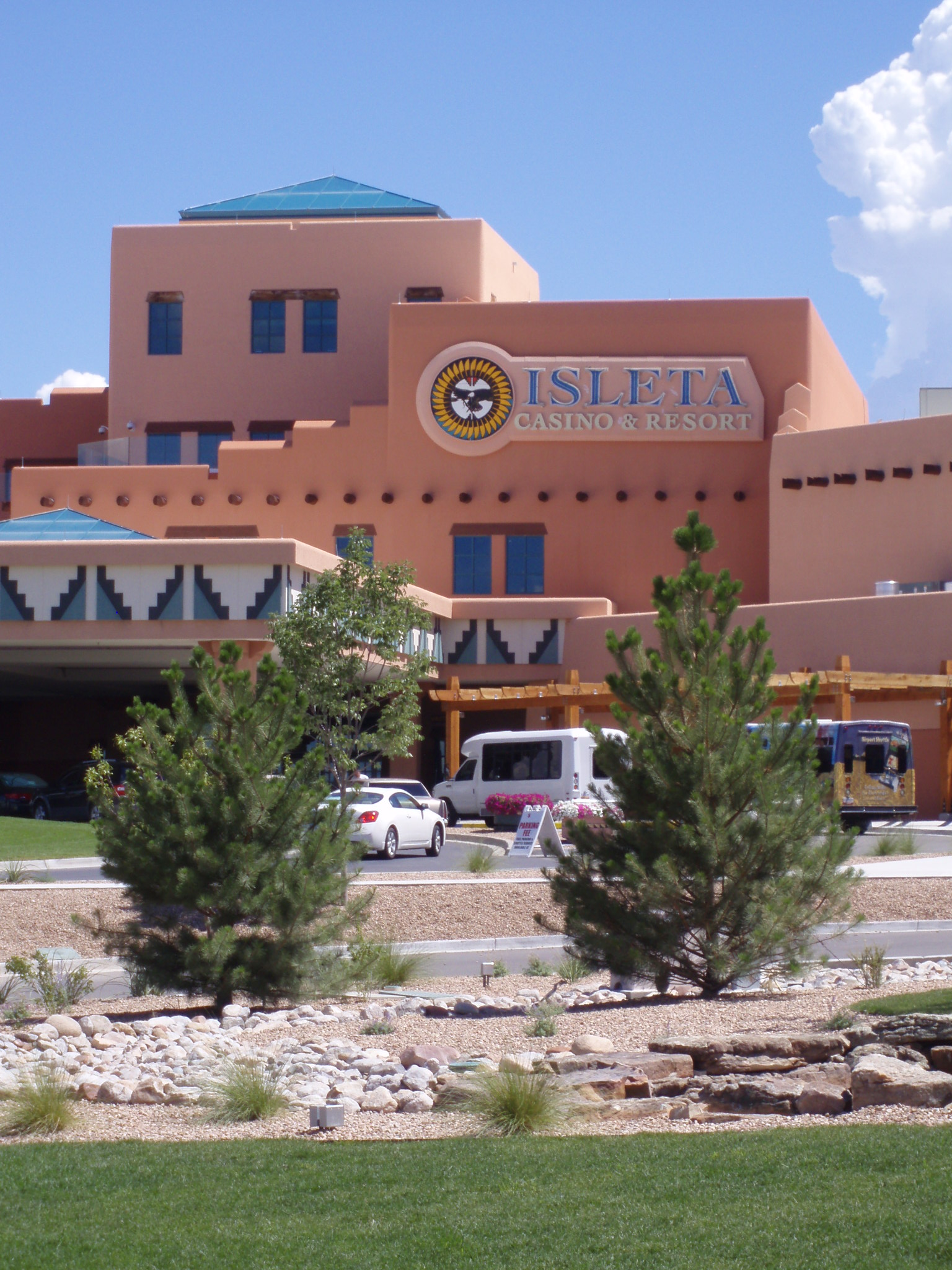

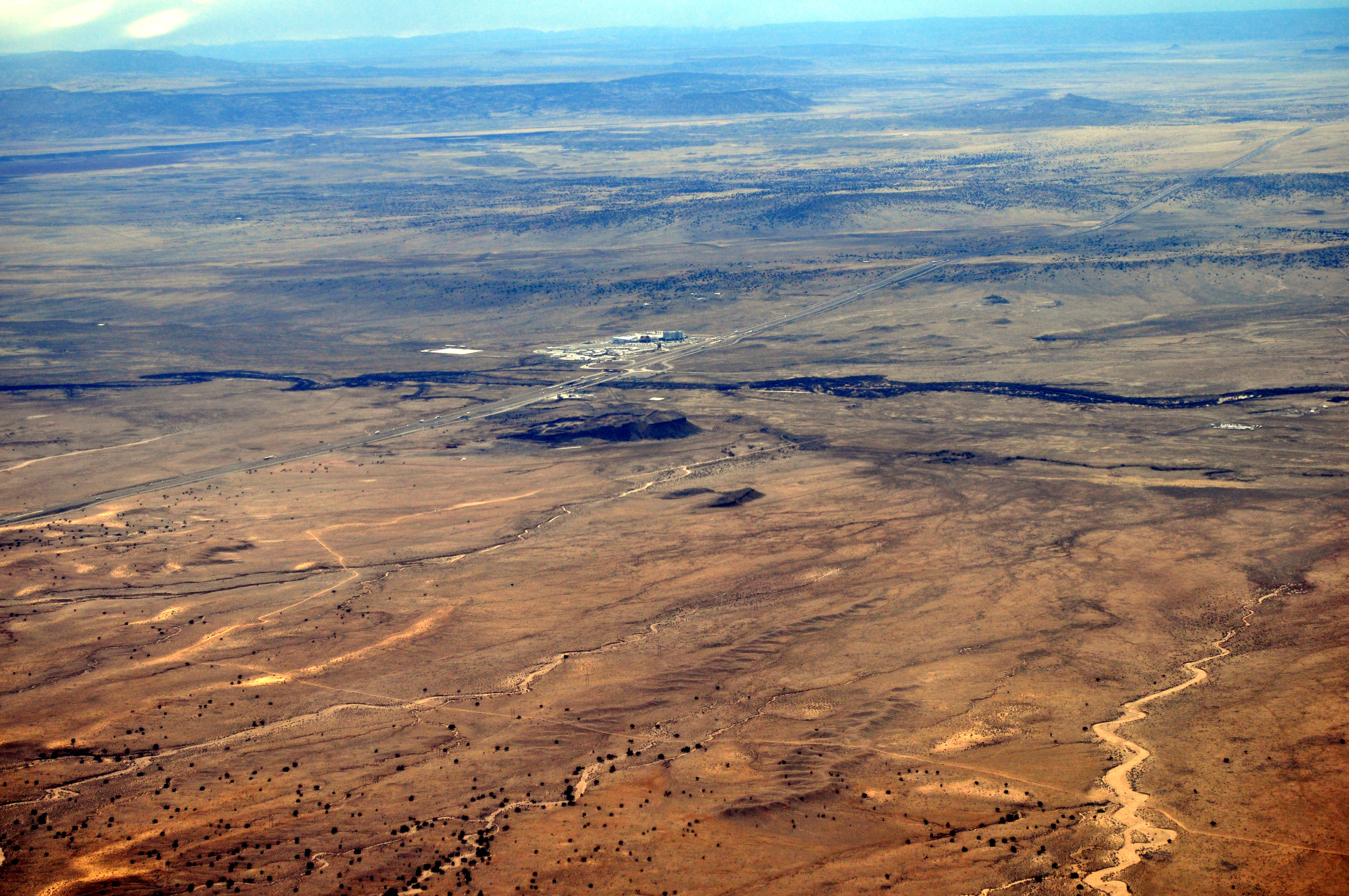

== See also ==
- List of casinos in the United States
- List of casino hotels
