= White Cliffs =

White Cliffs may refer to:

- The White Cliffs of Dover in the southeast of the United Kingdom
  - "(There'll Be Bluebirds Over) The White Cliffs of Dover", a popular World War II song
  - The White Cliffs of Dover (film), a 1944 American film
- White Cliffs, New South Wales, an opal-mining town in Australia
  - White Cliffs Solar Power Station, the town's main source of electricity between 1982 and 2004
- White Cliffs, St Margaret's Bay, country home of Noël Coward from 1946-1951
- White Cliffs, New Mexico, a census-designated place in the United States
- White Cliffs, a series of cliffs in southern Utah formed from the Navajo Sandstone formation
- White Cliffs building, the former summer house of Daniel B. Wesson in Northborough, Massachusetts

== See also ==
- Whitecliff, an area in Poole, Dorset, England
- Whitecliffs, a small town in the Canterbury region of New Zealand's South Island
