= Becenti, New Mexico =

Becenti, New Mexico Tłʼóoʼditsin (Navajo)
- Census-designated place
- Location within New Mexico Location within the United States
- Coordinates: 35°48′44″N 108°10′15″W
- Country: United States
- State: New Mexico
- County: McKinley

Area
  - Total: 0.94 sq mi (2.43 km^{2})
  - Land: 0.94 sq mi (2.43 km^{2})
  - Water: 0 sq mi (0.00 km^{2})
- Elevation: 6,585 ft (2,007 m)

Population (2020)
  - Total: 294
  - Density: 313.5/sq mi (121.03/km^{2})
- Time zone: UTC-7 (Mountain (MST))
  - Summer (DST): UTC-6 (MDT)
- ZIP Code: 87313 (Crownpoint)
- Area code: 505
- FIPS code: 35-06340
- GNIS feature ID: 2813403

Becenti (Navajo: Tłʼóoʼditsin) is a census-designated place (CDP) in McKinley County, New Mexico, United States, on the Navajo Nation. As of the 2020 census, it had a population of 294.

== Geography ==
The community is in the northern part of the county, less than a mile west of New Mexico State Road 371, part of the Trail of the Ancients Scenic Byway. It is 11 miles (18 km) north of Crownpoint and 75 miles (121 km) south of Farmington.

According to the U.S. Census Bureau, the CDP has a total area of 0.94 square miles (2.4 km^{2}), all land.

== Demographics ==
Historical population
Census	Pop.	Note	%±
2020	294		—
U.S. Decennial Census

Becenti was first listed as a CDP prior to the 2020 census.

== Education ==
It is in Gallup-McKinley County Public Schools.
