= Navajo Church =

Pillar in New Mexico, United States

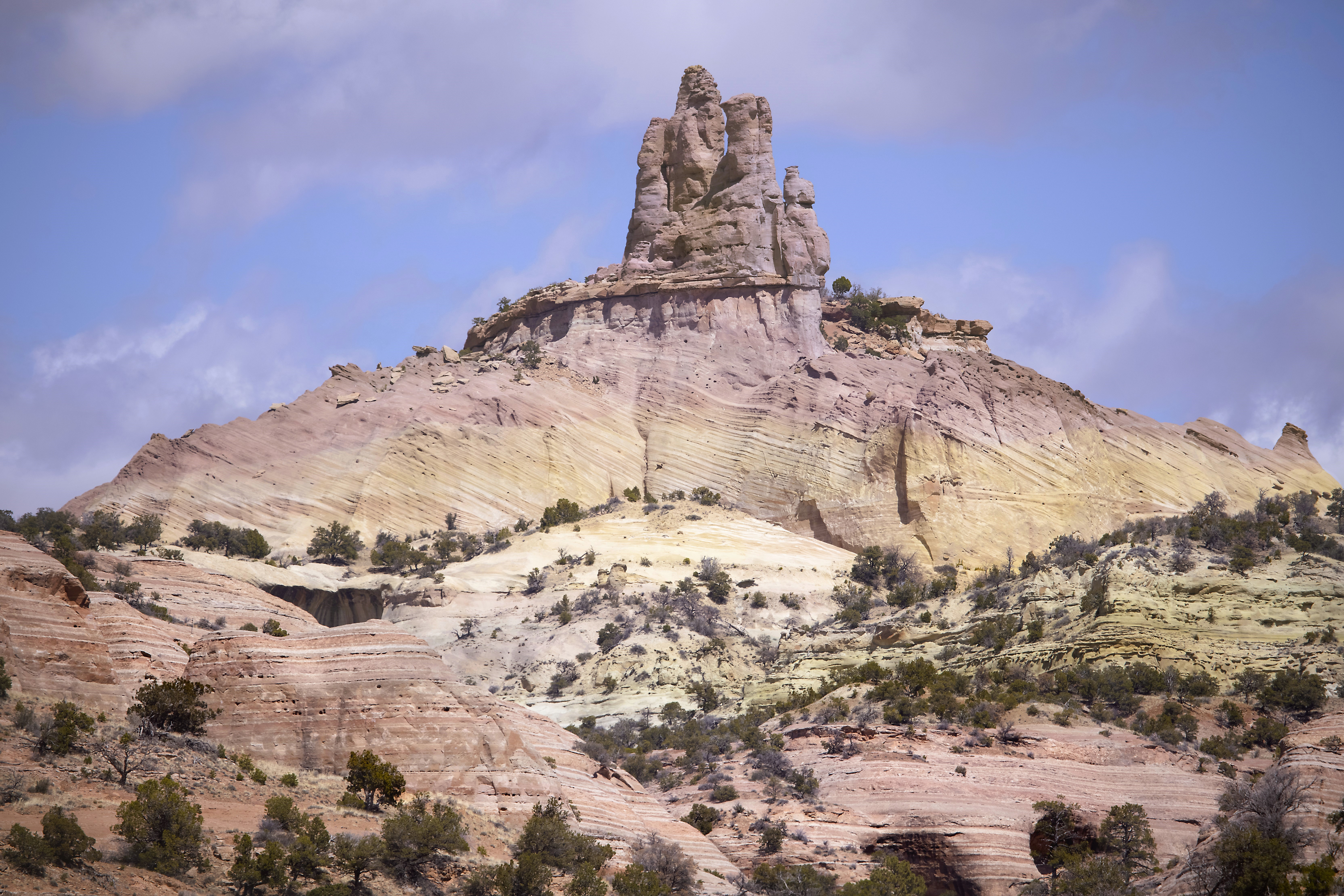
- South aspect

Highest point
- Elevation: 7,350 ft (2,240 m)
- Prominence: 340 ft (104 m)
- Parent peak: Pyramid Rock
- Isolation: 0.91 mi (1.46 km)
- Coordinates: 35°33′27″N 108°36′05″W

Geography
- Location within New Mexico Location within the United States
- Location: Navajo Nation
- Country: United States
- State: New Mexico
- County: McKinley
- Parent range: Zuñi Mountains; Colorado Plateau
- Topo map: USGS Church Rock

Geology
- Rock age: Late Jurassic
- Rock type: Morrison Formation

Climbing
- Easiest route: class 5+ climbing

Navajo Church is a 7,350-foot-elevation (2,240-meter) pillar in McKinley County, New Mexico, United States.

== Description ==
Navajo Church is part of the Zuñi Mountains. The landmark is located seven miles (11 km) east-northeast of Gallup and 1.5 miles (2.4 km) north of the town of Church Rock, which is named after the landform. Topographic relief is modest as the summit rises 550 feet (168 meters) above Red Rock State Park in 0.6 mile (1 km). A 2.2 mile (round-trip) hiking trail leads to, and around, the base of the spires. Precipitation runoff from the mountain drains to the Puerco River. Navajo Church is a sacred place to the Navajo people. This landform's toponym has been officially adopted by the United States Board on Geographic Names.

== Geology ==
The three spires of Navajo Church are composed of the Westwater Canyon Member of the Morrison Formation which dates to the Late Jurassic. The spires rest atop a pedestal of the formation's Recapture Member. This then overlays Zuni Sandstone which displays spectacular eolian crossbedding on the south face. Successive layers below dropping south to Red Rock Park include Bluff Sandstone, Summerville Formation, and Entrada Sandstone.

== Climate ==
According to the Köppen climate classification system, Navajo Church is located in a cool semiarid climate zone (Köppen BSk). The summers are hot during the day, but the high altitude and low humidity mean that nights remain distinctly cool. Most rain falls in the summer from afternoon thunderstorms, and winter snow is common and sometimes heavy.

== Gallery ==
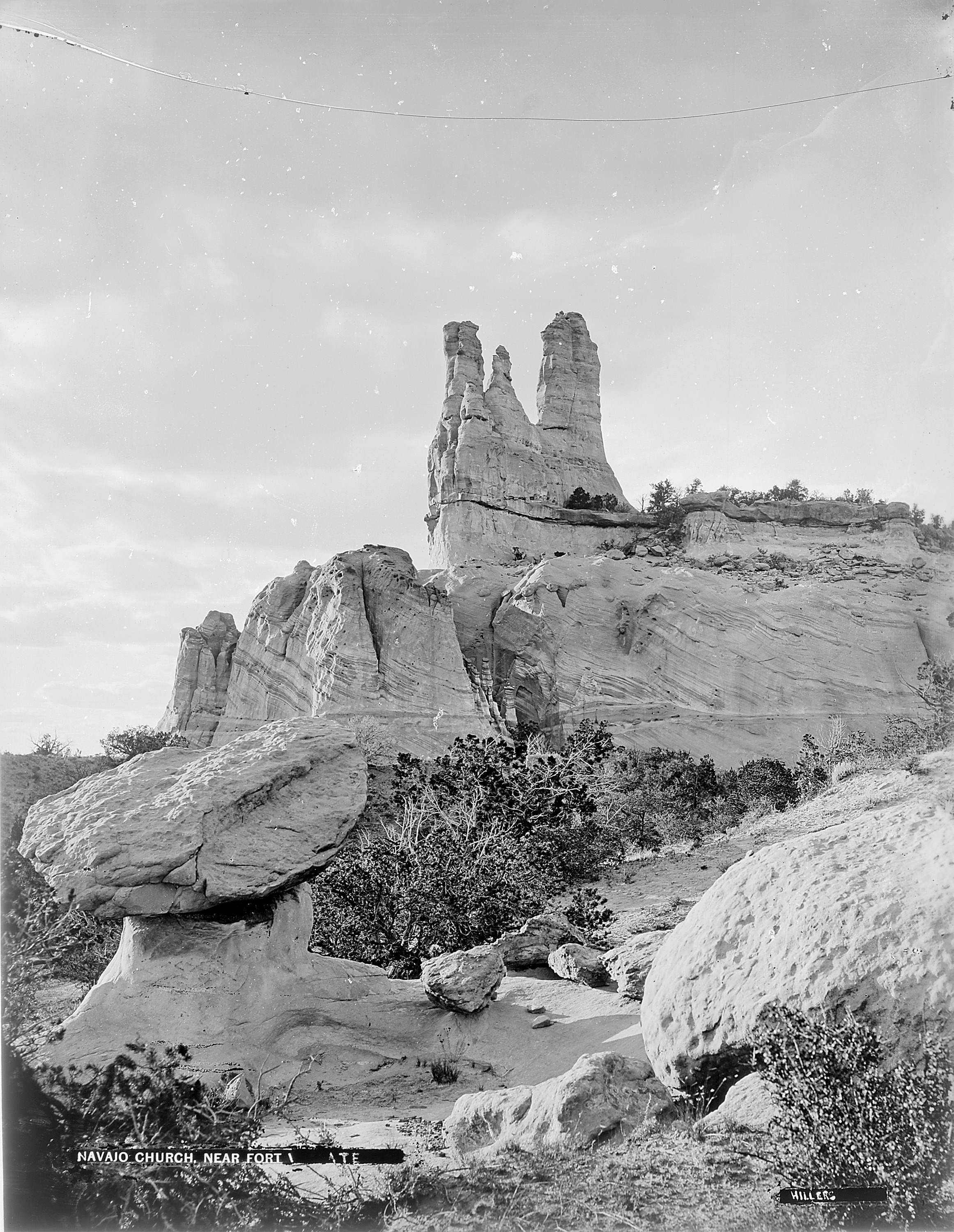
circa 1871–1878

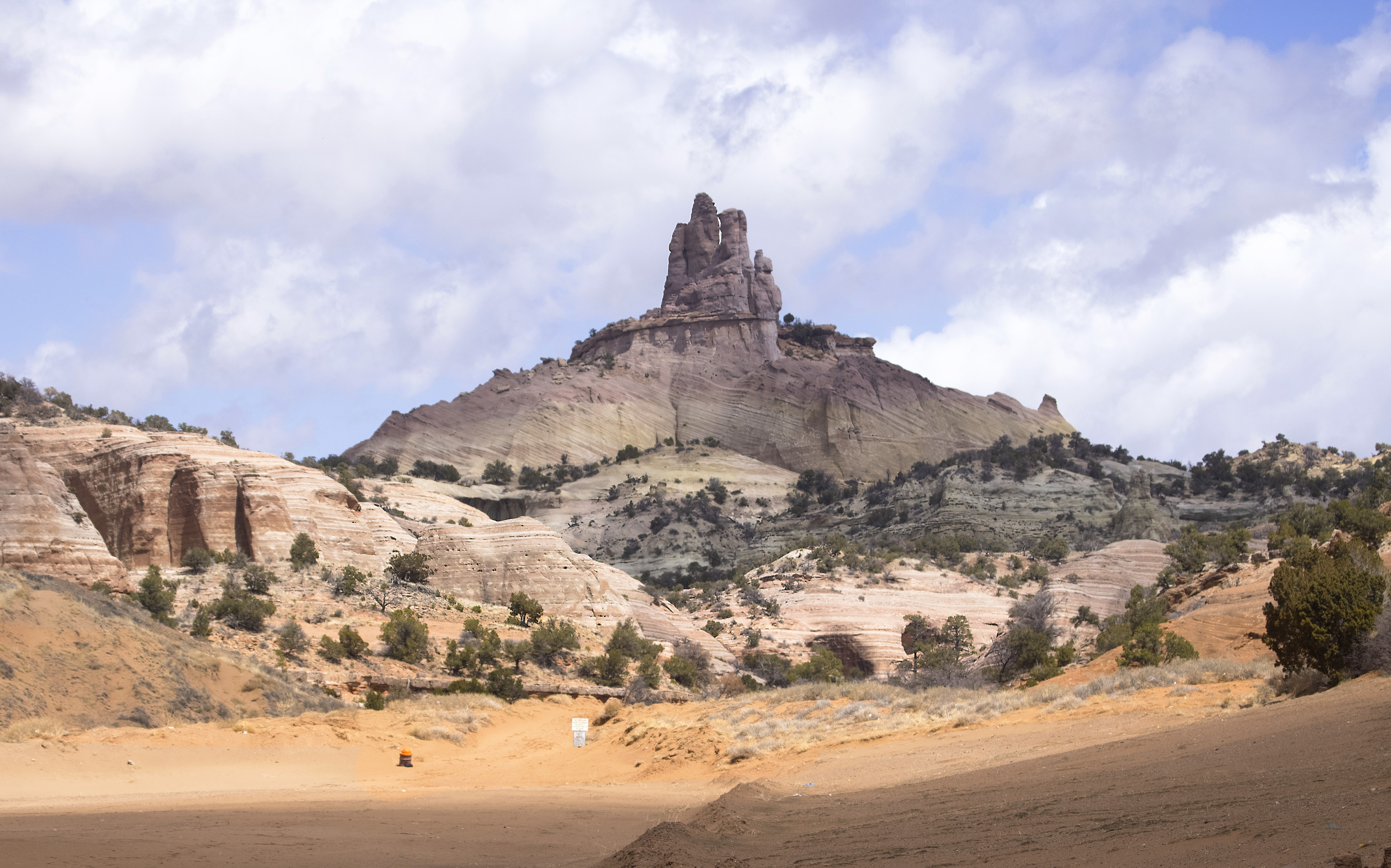
South aspect

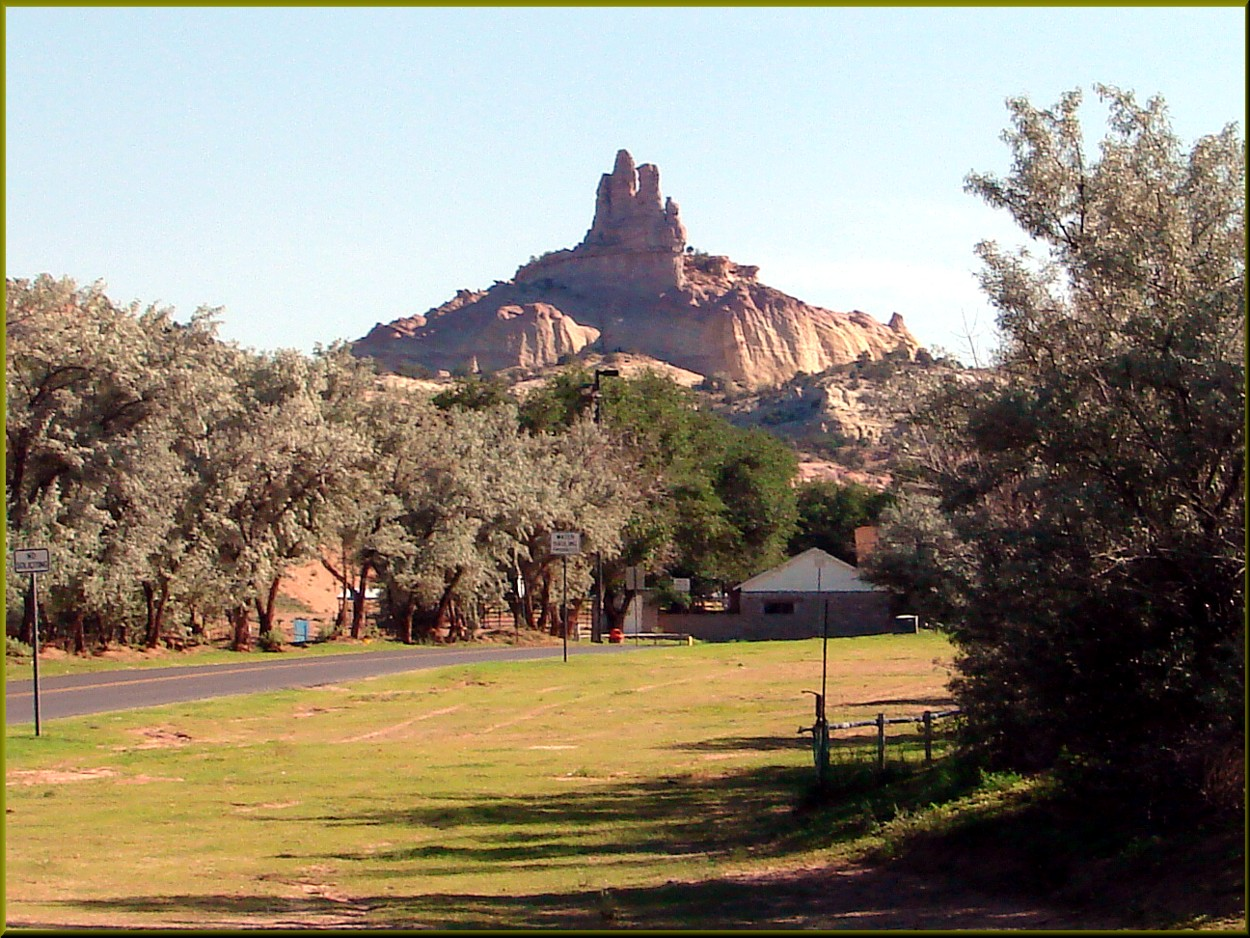
South aspect from Red Rock Park

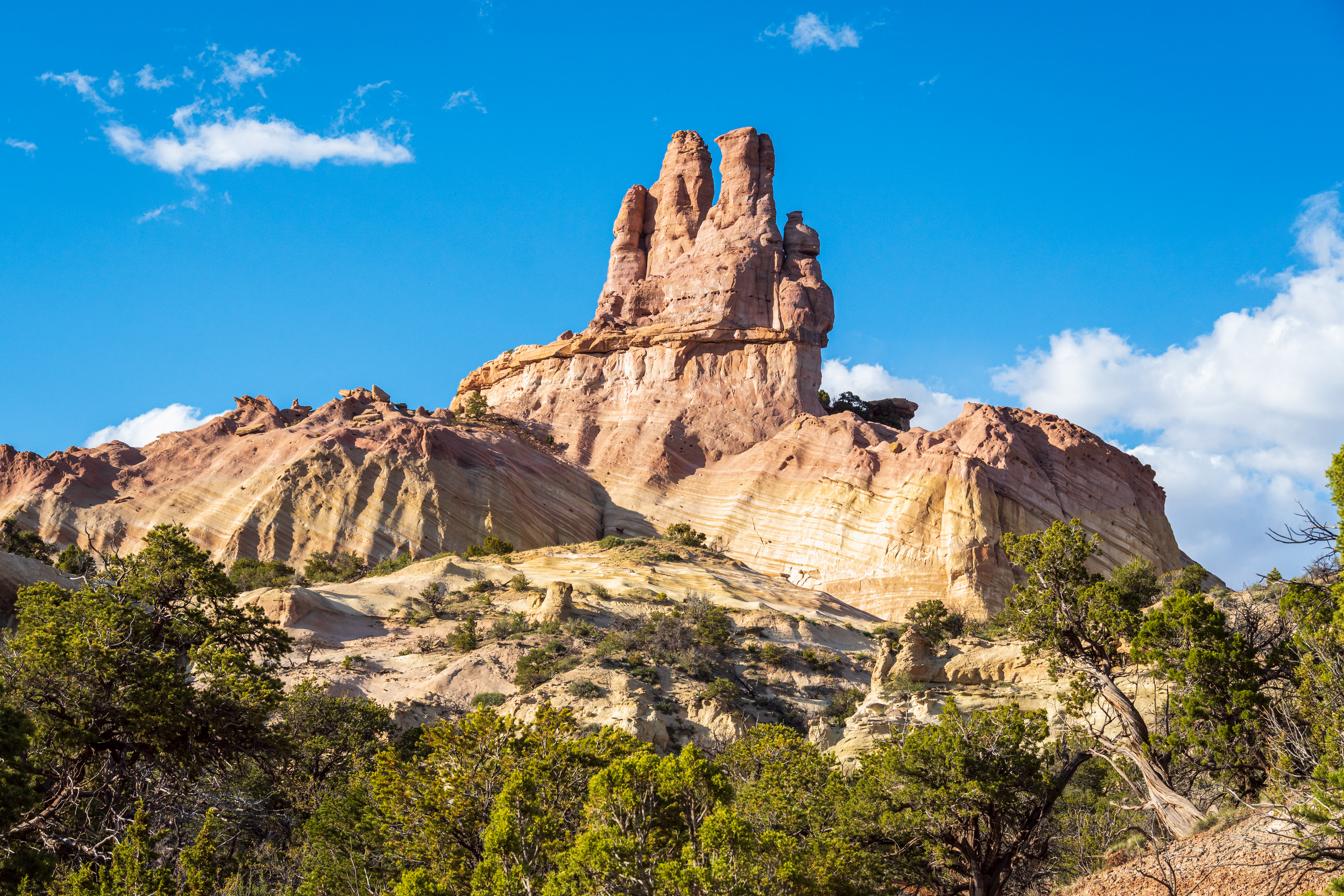

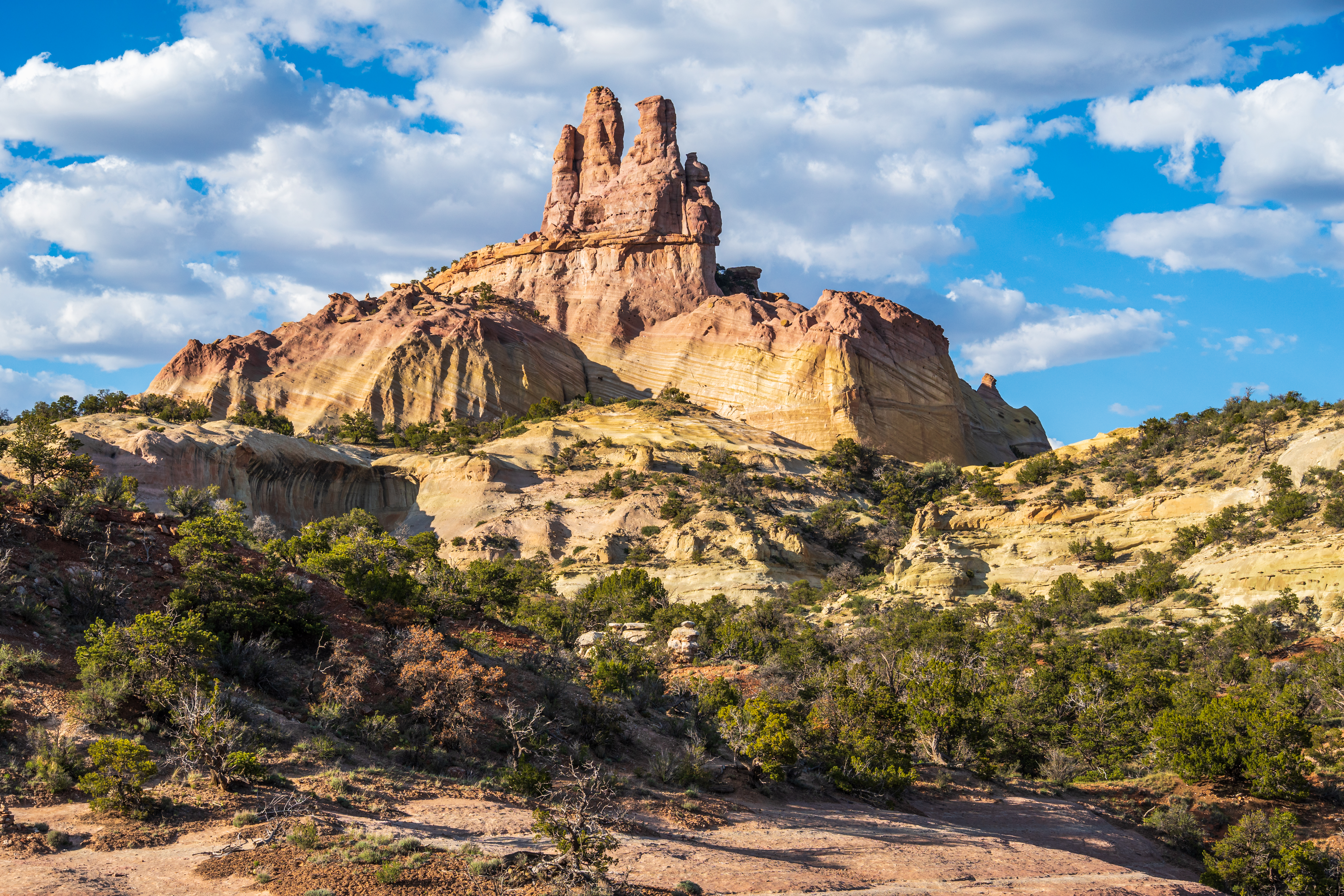
