= Pinehaven, New Mexico =

- Census-designated place
- Location within New Mexico Location within the United States
- Coordinates: 35°21′20″N 108°39′19″W
- Country: United States
- State: New Mexico
- County: McKinley

Area
  - Total: 6.97 sq mi (18.04 km^{2})
  - Land: 6.97 sq mi (18.04 km^{2})
  - Water: 0 sq mi (0.00 km^{2})
- Elevation: 7,261 ft (2,213 m)

Population (2020)
  - Total: 172
  - Density: 24.7/sq mi (9.53/km^{2})
- Time zone: UTC-7 (Mountain (MST))
  - Summer (DST): UTC-6 (MDT)
- ZIP Code: 87305 (Gallup)
- Area code: 505
- FIPS code: 35-57175
- GNIS feature ID: 2806728

Pinehaven is an unincorporated community and census-designated place (CDP) in McKinley County, New Mexico, United States. As of the 2020 census, it had a population of 172.

== Geography ==
The community is in the southwestern part of McKinley County, 18 miles (29 km) south of Gallup, the county seat, and 8 miles (13 km) northeast of Vanderwagen. Whitewater Arroyo flows through the central part of the CDP, running southwest to join the Puerco River near Houck, Arizona.

According to the U.S. Census Bureau, the Pinehaven CDP has an area of 6.96 square miles (18.03 km^{2}), all land.

== Demographics ==
Historical population
Census	Pop.	Note	%±
2020	172		—
U.S. Decennial Census

Pinehaven was first listed as a CDP prior to the 2020 census.

== Education ==
It is in Gallup-McKinley County Public Schools.
