= Sagar, New Mexico =

- Census-designated place
- Location within New Mexico Location within the United States
- Coordinates: 35°15′04″N 108°46′17″W
- Country: United States
- State: New Mexico
- County: McKinley

Area
  - Total: 1.87 sq mi (4.84 km^{2})
  - Land: 1.87 sq mi (4.84 km^{2})
  - Water: 0 sq mi (0.00 km^{2})
- Elevation: 7,248 ft (2,209 m)

Population (2020)
  - Total: 192
  - Density: 102.7/sq mi (39.66/km^{2})
- Time zone: UTC-7 (Mountain (MST))
  - Summer (DST): UTC-6 (MDT)
- ZIP Code: 87326 (Vanderwagen)
- Area code: 505
- FIPS code: 35-65595
- GNIS feature ID: 2806733

Sagar is an unincorporated community and census-designated place (CDP) in McKinley County, New Mexico, United States. As of the 2020 census, it had a population of 192.

== Geography ==
The community is in the southwestern part of McKinley County along New Mexico State Road 602, 20 miles (32 km) south of Gallup. The Vanderwagen post office, ZIP Code 87326, serves Sagar and is 2 miles (3 km) to the north on Highway 602.

According to the U.S. Census Bureau, the Sagar CDP has an area of 1.87 square miles (4.84 km^{2}), all land. The area is drained by Vanderwagen Draw, which runs west toward Bosson Wash, a south-flowing tributary of the Zuni River and part of the Little Colorado River watershed.

== Demographics ==
Historical population
Census	Pop.	Note	%±
2020	192		—
U.S. Decennial Census

Sagar was first listed as a CDP prior to the 2020 census.

== Education ==
It is in Gallup-McKinley County Public Schools.

Residents are zoned to David Skeet Elementary School, Gallup Middle School, and Hiroshi Miyamura High School.
