= Crestview, New Mexico =

- Census-designated place
- Location within New Mexico Location within the United States
- Coordinates: 35°29′16″N 108°51′27″W
- Country: United States
- State: New Mexico
- County: McKinley

Area
  - Total: 1.30 sq mi (3.37 km^{2})
  - Land: 1.30 sq mi (3.37 km^{2})
  - Water: 0 sq mi (0.00 km^{2})
- Elevation: 6,539 ft (1,993 m)

Population (2020)
  - Total: 279
  - Density: 214.3/sq mi (82.73/km^{2})
- Time zone: UTC-7 (Mountain (MST))
  - Summer (DST): UTC-6 (MDT)
- ZIP Code: 87301 (Gallup)
- Area code: 505
- FIPS code: 35-18770
- GNIS feature ID: 2806715

Crestview is a census-designated place (CDP) in McKinley County, New Mexico, United States. As of the 2020 census, it had a population of 279.

== Geography ==
The community is in the western part of the county, bordered to the north by Williams Acres. Interstate 40 forms the northern border of the Crestview CDP, with the closest access one mile to the east at Exit 16 (NM 118) in Gallup.

According to the U.S. Census Bureau, the CDP has an area of 1.3 square miles (3.4 km^{2}), all land. The community drains to Twin Buttes Wash, a north-flowing tributary of the Puerco River, part of the Little Colorado River watershed.

== Demographics ==
Historical population
| Census | Pop. | Note | %± |
|---|---|---|---|
| 2020 | 279 | | — |
U.S. Decennial Census

Crestview was first listed as a CDP prior to the 2020 census.

== Education ==
It is in Gallup-McKinley County Public Schools.

Zoned schools are: Stagecoach Elementary School, Chief Manualito Middle School, and Gallup High School.
