= Catalpa Canyon, New Mexico =

- Census-designated place
- Location within New Mexico Location within the United States
- Coordinates: 35°29′39″N 108°43′14″W
- Country: United States
- State: New Mexico
- County: McKinley

Area
  - Total: 7.04 sq mi (18.23 km^{2})
  - Land: 7.04 sq mi (18.23 km^{2})
  - Water: 0 sq mi (0.00 km^{2})
- Elevation: 6,713 ft (2,046 m)

Population (2020)
  - Total: 161
  - Density: 22.9/sq mi (8.83/km^{2})
- Time zone: UTC-7 (Mountain (MST))
  - Summer (DST): UTC-6 (MDT)
- ZIP Codes: 87301, 87305 (Gallup)
- Area code: 505
- FIPS code: 35-12844
- GNIS feature ID: 2806713

Catalpa Canyon is a census-designated place (CDP) in McKinley County, New Mexico, United States. As of the 2020 census, it had a population of 161.

== Geography ==
The community is in the western part of McKinley County and is bordered to the north by the city of Gallup, the county seat. Catalpa Canyon is a valley in the center of the CDP that drains north to the Puerco River in the eastern part of Gallup.

New Mexico State Road 602 passes through the western part of the CDP, leading north into Gallup and south 15 miles (24 km) to Vanderwagen.

According to the U.S. Census Bureau, the CDP has an area of 7.0 square miles (18.1 km^{2}), all land.

== Demographics ==
Historical population
Census	Pop.	Note	%±
2020	161		—
U.S. Decennial Census

Catalpa Canyon was first listed as a CDP prior to the 2020 census.

== Education ==
It is in Gallup-McKinley County Public Schools.

Most areas are zoned to Red Rock Elementary School, though some are zoned to Jefferson and Stagecoach elementaries. Most areas are zoned to Gallup Middle School, though some are zoned to Chief Manualito and John F. Kennedy middle schools. Most areas are zoned to Hiroshi Miyamura High School though some are zoned to Gallup High School.
