= Gallup Refinery =

- Location of the Gallup Refinery in New Mexico
- Location: Gallup, New Mexico, New Mexico, United States; 35°29′16.4″N 108°25′37.5″W

Refinery details
- Owner: Marathon Petroleum Corporation
- Closed: 2020
- Capacity: 26,000 barrels per day (4,100 m^{3}/d)
- No. of employees: 220

The Gallup Refinery, also known as the Ciniza Refinery, was an American oil refinery. The facility is located in northwestern New Mexico along Interstate 40, approximately 20 miles east of the city center of Gallup and near the town of Jamestown, New Mexico. The facility occupies 880 acres in McKinley County and employed approximately 220 employees as of March 2019. The facility processed approximately 26,000 barrels of crude oil per day and produced gasoline, diesel, heavy fuel oil, and propane.

== History ==
The facility was originally built by El Paso Natural Gas Company and purchased in March 1964 by the Shell Oil Company.

In October 1981, the facility was purchased by Giant Industries, Inc.

In April 2004, the facility became the subject of a Chemical Safety Board investigation following a fire and explosion at the hydrofluoric acid alkylation unit. Four workers were seriously injured.

In November 2006, Western Refining agreed to purchase the facility, with the transaction closing in Q1 2007.

In November 2016, Tesoro announced the acquisition of Western Refining. Following the acquisition, Tesoro changes its name to Andeavor in August 2017.

In May 2018, Marathon Petroleum announced the purchase of Andeavor, becoming the largest refinery operator in the United States. The merger was completed in October 2018.

In April 2020, Marathon announced that the refinery would be idled, citing decreased demand for refined products amid the 2020 Coronavirus Pandemic.

In August 2020, Marathon announced that the refinery would be permanently closed, with operations expected to cease by October.

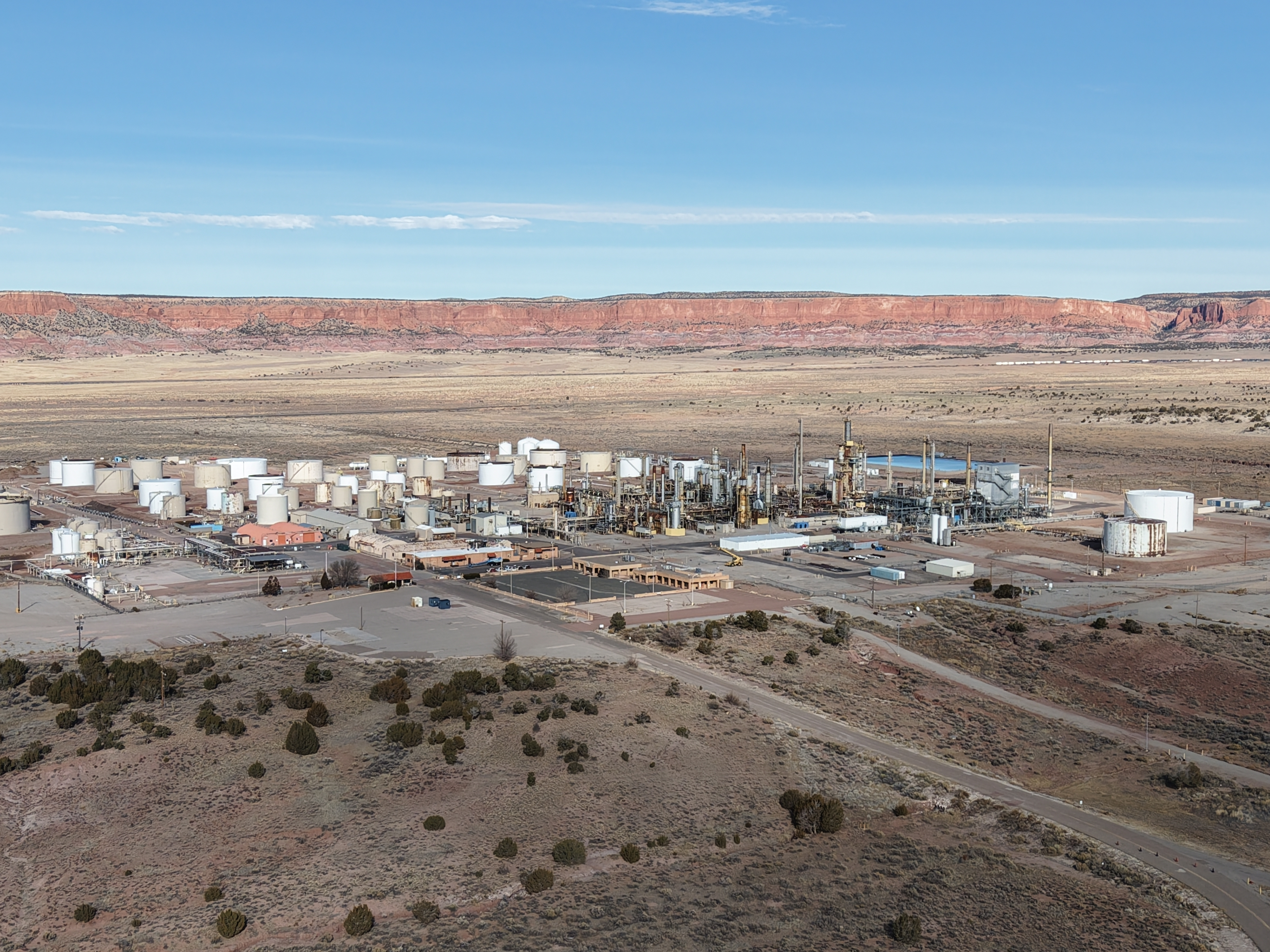
Gallup refinery, as seen from the southwest in December, 2025

== See also ==
- List of oil refineries
- Marathon Petroleum Company
