= Billy Rucker =

Profile
- Position: Quarterback

Personal information
- Born: c. 1965

Career information
- High school: Gallup (NM)
- College: New Mexico (1983–1986)

Billy Rucker (born c. 1965) is a former American football quarterback. He played college football for the New Mexico Lobos from 1983 to 1986. As a junior in 1985, he ranked among the leading quarterbacks in major-college football with 18.5 passing yards per completion (1st), 9.2 passing yards per attempt (2nd), 16 passing interceptions (8th), and 2,587 total yards (10th).
