= Red Rock Ranch, New Mexico =

- Census-designated place
- Location within New Mexico Location within the United States
- Coordinates: 35°25′28″N 108°01′18″W
- Country: United States
- State: New Mexico
- County: McKinley

Area
  - Total: 4.77 sq mi (12.36 km^{2})
  - Land: 4.77 sq mi (12.36 km^{2})
  - Water: 0 sq mi (0.00 km^{2})
- Elevation: 6,880 ft (2,100 m)

Population (2020)
  - Total: 35
  - Density: 7.3/sq mi (2.83/km^{2})
- Time zone: UTC-7 (Mountain (MST))
  - Summer (DST): UTC-6 (MDT)
- ZIP Code: 87045 (Prewitt)
- Area code: 505
- FIPS code: 35-62295
- GNIS feature ID: 2806732

Red Rock Ranch is an unincorporated community and census-designated place (CDP) in McKinley County, New Mexico, United States. As of the 2020 census, it had a population of 35.

== Geography ==
The community is in the southeastern part of McKinley County, 6 miles (10 km) north of Interstate 40 at Prewitt. The area is drained by Casamero Draw, which runs south to Mitchell Draw near Prewitt. The area is part of the Rio San Jose watershed leading southeast to the Rio Puerco and eventually the Rio Grande.

== Education ==
It is in Gallup-McKinley County Public Schools.

== Demographics ==
Historical population
Census	Pop.	Note	%±
2020	35		—
U.S. Decennial Census

Red Rock Ranch was first listed as a CDP prior to the 2020 census.
