= New Mexico State Road 566 =

State highway in New Mexico, United States

State Road 566
- NM 566 highlighted in red

Route information
- Maintained by NMDOT
- Length: 11.644 mi (18.739 km)

Major junctions
- South end: NM 118 in Church Rock
- North end: Church Rock Mine

Location
- Country: United States
- State: New Mexico
- Counties: McKinley

Highway system
- New Mexico State Highway System; Interstate; US; State; Scenic
← NM 564	→ NM 567

State Road 566 (NM 566) is a 11.644-mile-long (18.739 km) state highway in the US state of New Mexico. NM 566's southern terminus is at NM 118 in Church Rock, and the northern terminus is at the end of state maintenance by Church Rock Mine.

== Major intersections ==
The entire route is in McKinley County.

Location	mi	km	Destinations	Notes
Church Rock	0.000	0.000	NM 118	Southern terminus
Church Rock Mine	11.644	18.739	Northern terminus	
1.000 mi = 1.609 km; 1.000 km = 0.621 mi
