= Gamerco, New Mexico =

Gamerco, New Mexico Łigaiyaaʼáhí
- Census-designated place
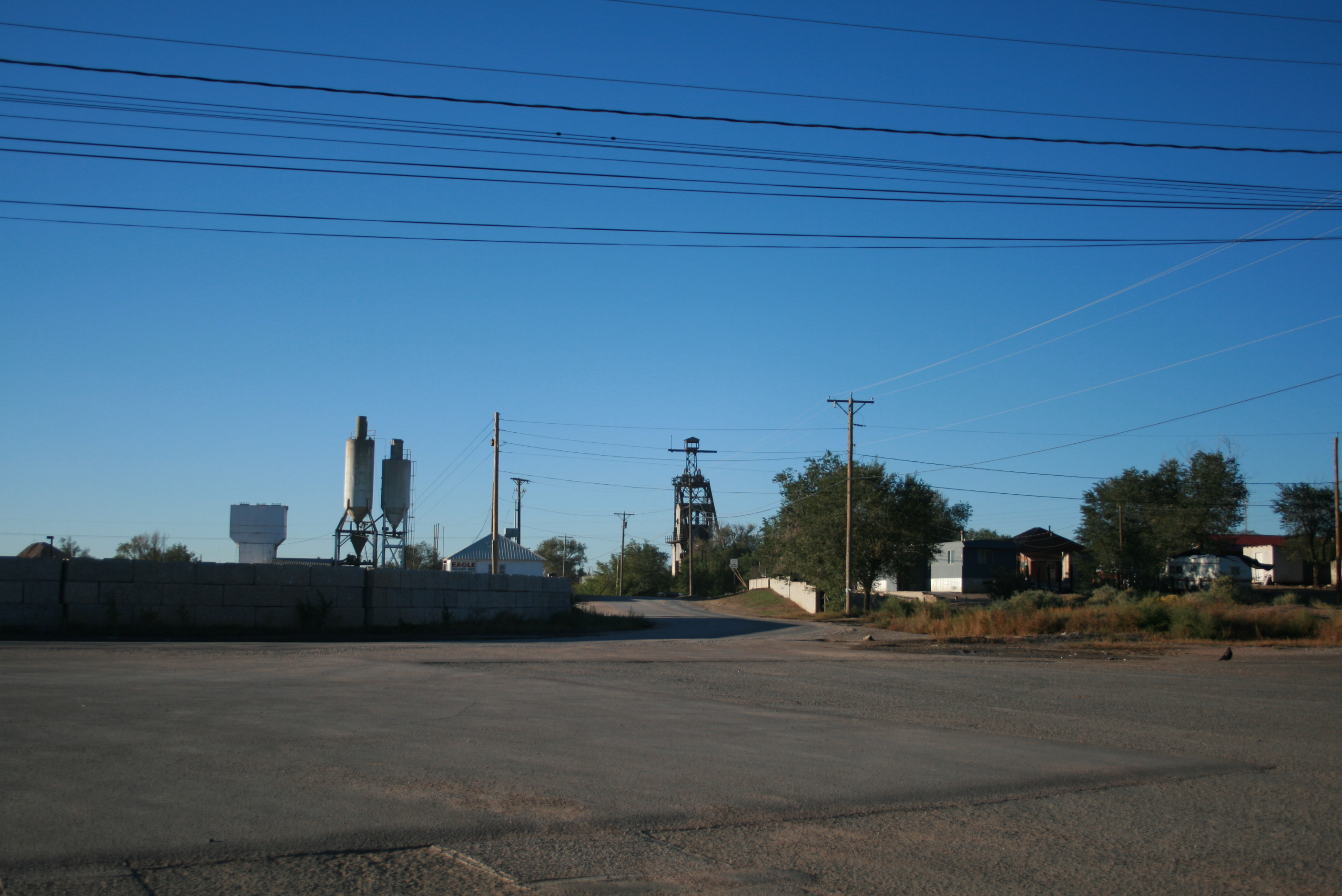
- Location of the old power plant

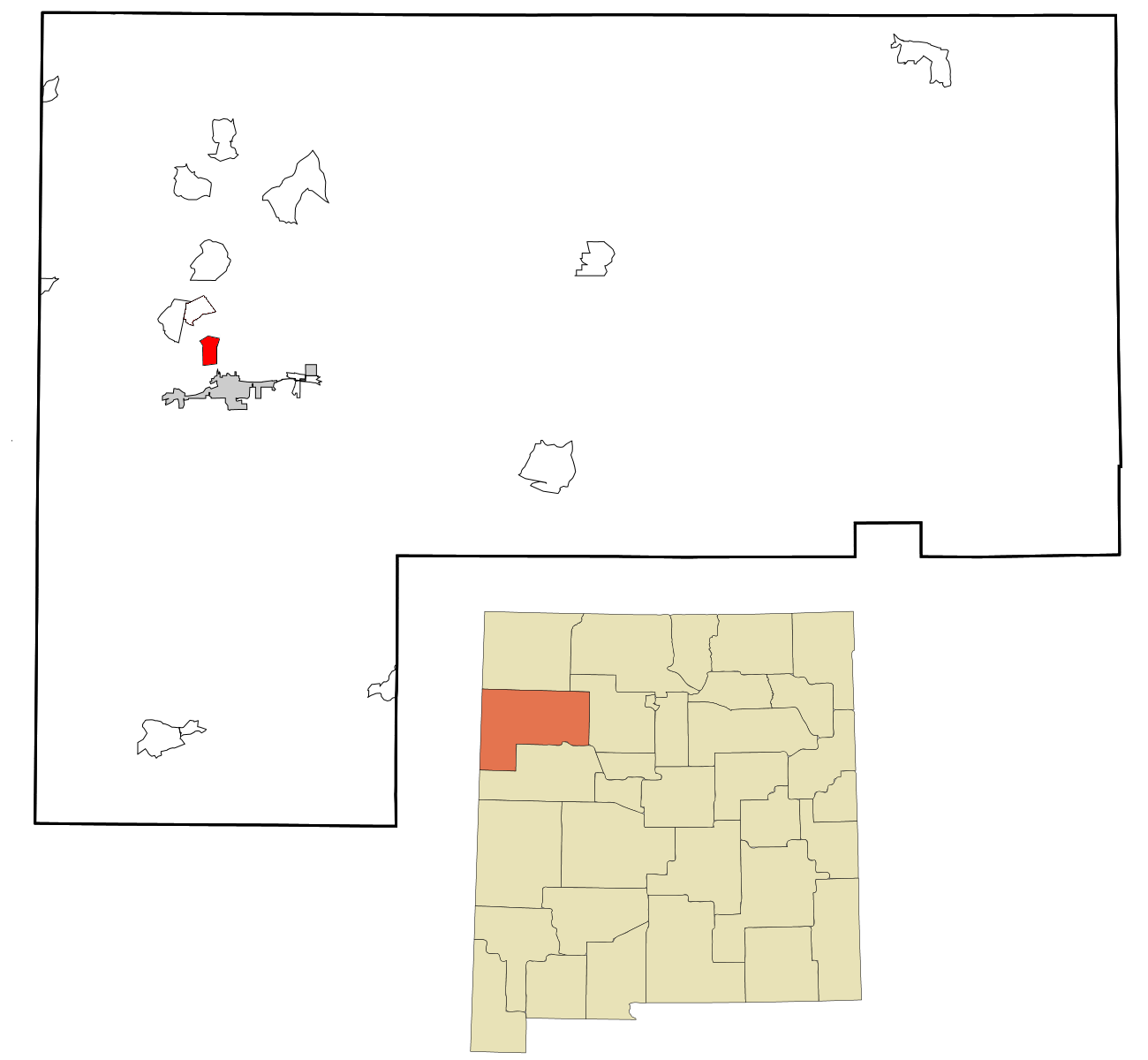
- Location in McKinley County and the state of New Mexico
- Coordinates: 35°34′12″N 108°45′51″W
- Country: United States
- State: New Mexico
- County: McKinley

Area
  - Total: 0.96 sq mi (2.48 km^{2})
  - Land: 0.96 sq mi (2.48 km^{2})
  - Water: 0 sq mi (0.00 km^{2})
- Elevation: 6,729 ft (2,051 m)

Population (2020)
  - Total: 1,343
  - Density: 1,403/sq mi (541.8/km^{2})
- Time zone: UTC-7 (Mountain (MST))
  - Summer (DST): UTC-6 (MDT)
- ZIP Code: 87317
- Area code: 505
- FIPS code: 35-28530
- GNIS feature ID: 2806717

Gamerco, also called in Navajo: Łigaiyaaʼáhí (Navajo pronunciation: [ɬi˥ka˩i˩jaː˩ʔa˥hi˥], meaning "white smokestack"), is an unincorporated community and census-designated place in McKinley County, New Mexico, United States. As of the 2020 census the population was 1,343, down from 1,956 in 2010. Gamerco was used as a base for coal mining until the 1960s.

== History ==
Gamerco was settled as a company town in 1920 when the Gallup American Coal Company (from which the community is named) began sinking coal mine shafts in the surrounding hills. A coal processing plant, rail spur, power plant, and a church were built to serve the community and its mining operations. Around 500 coal miners and their families called Gamerco home. In the 1960s the coal mines were closed, the power plant decommissioned, and the railroad spur removed.

== Geography ==
Gamerco is in west-central McKinley County, 3 miles (5 km) north of the city of Gallup. U.S. Route 491 forms the eastern edge of the community; it runs south to Interstate 40 in Gallup and north 5 miles (8 km) to Yah-ta-hey.

According to the U.S. Census Bureau, the Gamerco CDP has an area of 0.96 square miles (2.49 km^{2}), all land. The area drains toward Gamerco Wash, which runs south to the Puerco River in Gallup, part of the Little Colorado River watershed.

== Demographics ==
Historical population
Census	Pop.	Note	%±
2010	1,956		—
2020	1,343		−31.3%
U.S. Decennial Census

As of the census of 2010, there were 1,956 people, 586 households, and 457 families residing in the community. The population density was 230.1 people per square mile (88.8 people/km^{2}). There were 634 housing units at an average density of 74.1 per square mile (28.6/km^{2}). The racial makeup of the CDP was 50.4% Native American, 16% White, 0.1% Asian, 32.2% from other races, and 6.6% from two or more races. Hispanic or Latino of any race were 42.5% of the population.

There were 586 households, out of which 34.6% had children under the age of 18 living with them, 47.6% were married couples living together, 19.8% had a female householder with no husband present, and 20.3% were non-families. 17.2% of all households were made up of individuals, and 4.4% had someone living alone who was 65 years of age or older. The average household size was 3.35 and the average family size was 3.75.

In the community, the population was spread out, with 37.6% under the age of 18, 10.9% from 18 to 24, 23.9% from 25 to 44, 25.1% from 45 to 64, and 8.3% who were 65 years of age or older. The median age was 27 years. For every 100 females, there were 100.8 males. For every 100 females age 18 and over, there were 102.6 males.

The median income for a household in the community was $54,098, and the median income for a family was $58,411. Males had a median income of $27,558 versus $27,101 for females. The per capita income for the CDP was $19,436. About 24.4% of families and 19.1% of the population were below the poverty line, including 11.6% of those under age 18 and 99.9% of those age 65 or over.

== Education ==
Public education in Gamerco is provided by Gallup-McKinley County Public Schools.
