= Miyamura High School =

Public high school in Gallup, New Mexico

Hiroshi H. Miyamura High School

Location
- 680 South Boardman; Gallup, New Mexico; United States
- 35°31′01″N 108°42′31″W

Information
- Type: Public
- Established: 2007; 19 years ago
- School district: Gallup-McKinley County Schools
- Principal: Jeff Hartog; Taylor Ramirez (Assistant Principal/ Athletic Director); Joshua Benyola (Assistant Principal)
- Faculty: 69.90 (FTE)
- Grades: 9-12
- Enrollment: 1,180 (2018–19)
- Student to teacher ratio: 16.88
- Colors: Purple, Silver
- Athletics: NMAA; District 1-AAAA
- Mascot: Patriot
- Website: https://hmh.gmcs.org

Hiroshi Miyamura High School is a high school in Gallup, New Mexico. Formerly known as Gallup Junior High School, it was renamed Miyamura High School in 2007 as part of the Gallup-McKinley County Schools’ plan to create a second high school to serve Gallup, and was renovated from 2008 to 2010. The school's location was the site of the old Gallup High School campus from 1962 to 1998, before the latter moved to Gallup's west side. Miyamura High School is named after Korean War hero and Medal of Honor recipient, Hiroshi Miyamura.

== Attendance boundary ==
Miyamura draws students from the eastern side of Gallup, while Gallup High School draws students from the western side of Gallup. However, it is not uncommon to see students switch schools.

In addition to portions of Gallup, its boundary includes Chi Chil Tah, Church Rock, Fort Wingate, Jamestown, Rehoboth, Sagar, and Vanderwagen, as well as most of Catalpa Canyon.

== Athletics and activities ==
The school colors are purple and silver, based on the colors of the Purple Heart.

Miyamura High School contains various clubs which students join and participate in. These include the Business Professionals of America, FCA, MESA, FCCLA, and Skills USA.
