= Apache Nugget Casino =

Casino near Cuba, New Mexico, United States

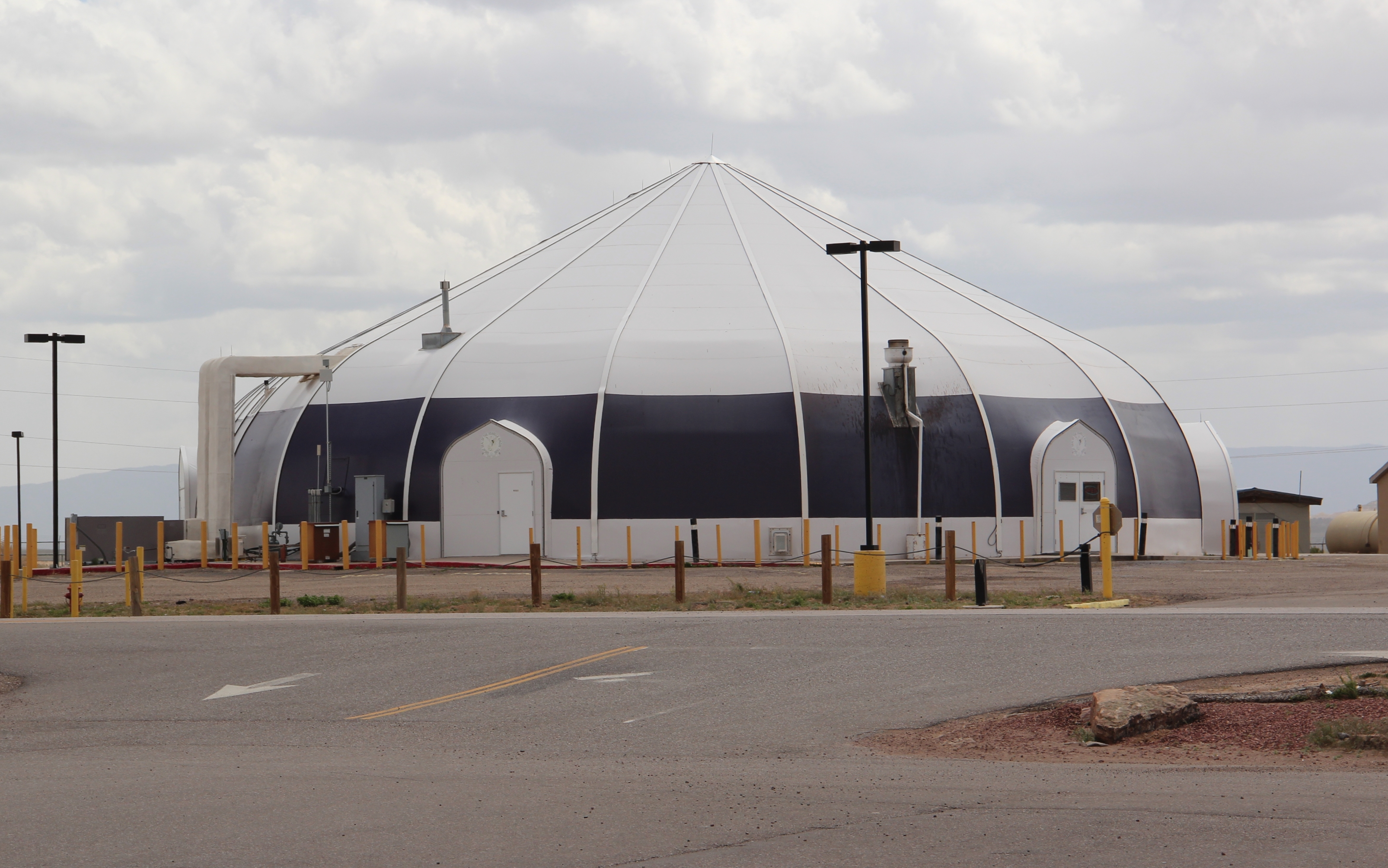
- Apache Nugget Casino in 2014
- Interactive map of Apache Nugget Casino
- Location: Near Cuba, New Mexico, U.S.; 36°08′52″N 107°15′46″W
- Opened: August 6, 2004
- Owner: Apache Nugget Corporation
- Website: Official website

The Apache Nugget Casino is located 15 miles (24 km) north of Cuba, New Mexico, at the junctions of highway 550 and highway 537. The casino is operated by the Apache Nugget Corporation (ANC) which oversees all gaming activity for the Jicarilla Apache Nation. ANC is a for-profit Federally Chartered Section 17 Corporation owned by the Jicarilla Apache Nation. It is located in Dulce, New Mexico, the headquarters for the Nation. ANC has been in existence since 2003.

In March 2020, tribal casinos across New Mexico closed temporarily during the COVID-19 pandemic. Apache Nugget later reopened on February 14, 2025 following a prolonged pandemic closure.

In 2025 the operator announced a partnership to install a full-service race and sportsbook at the property, targeted to open in August 2025.

== Facilities ==
ANC's casino property the Apache Nugget Casino opened on August 6, 2004. The Apache Nugget Casino has 227 slot machines. In addition, it offers a small dining facility, gift/smoke shop, and a player's club.

== Ownership and operations ==
Apache Nugget Casino is operated by the Apache Nugget Corporation, a business enterprise of the Jicarilla Apache Nation.

== See also ==
- List of casinos in New Mexico
