= Jamestown, New Mexico =

- Census-designated place
- Location within New Mexico Location within the United States
- Coordinates: 35°28′10″N 108°26′22″W
- Country: United States
- State: New Mexico
- County: McKinley

Area
  - Total: 2.73 sq mi (7.07 km^{2})
  - Land: 2.73 sq mi (7.07 km^{2})
  - Water: 0 sq mi (0.00 km^{2})
- Elevation: 7,041 ft (2,146 m)

Population (2020)
  - Total: 317
  - Density: 116.2/sq mi (44.85/km^{2})
- Time zone: UTC-7 (Mountain (MST))
  - Summer (DST): UTC-6 (MDT)
- ZIP code: 87347
- Area code: 505
- FIPS code: 35-35070
- GNIS feature ID: 2806723

Jamestown is an unincorporated community and census-designated place located along Interstate 40 in McKinley County, New Mexico, United States. As of the 2020 census, it had a population of 317.

== History ==
El Paso Natural Gas Company built a refinery at the Continental Divide in New Mexico around the area of 35.48698357712149, -108.4264608980443. The refinery was known locally as the Gallup Refinery or the Ciniza Refinery. By 1964, El Paso Gas sold the refinery to the Shell Oil Company. Then in 1982, Giant Oil Refining purchased the refinery from Shell. In 1987, Giant built the largest truck stop and retail facility in their chain one mile south from the refinery. On June 7, 2003, Giant sold its travel center in Jamestown to Pilot Travel Centers. Pilot Travel Center #305 houses Jamestown's post office; the post office has ZIP code 87347.

According to USA Today, in 1993 the truck stop and refinery were the only two establishments in the community. By 2020, there were also a fire department. The oil refinery changed ownership several times and was slated to close by October 2020, as per its last owner, Marathon Petroleum.

== Geography ==
Jamestown is in west-central McKinley County, mainly on the south side of Interstate 40, while the refinery is to the north, outside the census-designated place. I-40 leads west 18 miles (29 km) to Gallup, the county seat, and east over the Continental Divide 120 miles (190 km) to Albuquerque.

According to the U.S. Census Bureau, the Jamestown CDP has an area of 2.73 square miles (7.07 km^{2}), all land. The community drains northward toward the westward-flowing South Fork of the Puerco River, part of the Little Colorado River watershed.

== Demographics ==
Historical population
Census	Pop.	Note	%±
2020	317		—
U.S. Decennial Census

Jamestown was first listed as a census-designated place prior to the 2020 census.

== Education ==
It is in Gallup-McKinley County Public Schools. Its zoned schools are Del Norte Elementary School, Kennedy Middle School, and Hiroshi Miyamura High School.
