= New Mexico State Road 612 =

State highway in New Mexico, United States

State Road 612
- NM 612 highlighted in red

Route information
- Maintained by NMDOT
- Length: 9.149 mi (14.724 km)

Major junctions
- South end: End of state maintenance at the McKinley–Cibola county line
- North end: I-40 / NM 371 in Thoreau

Location
- Country: United States
- State: New Mexico
- Counties: McKinley

Highway system
- New Mexico State Highway System; Interstate; US; State; Scenic
← NM 610	→ NM 615

State Road 612 (NM 612) is a 9.1-mile-long (14.6 km) state highway in the US state of New Mexico. NM 612's southern terminus is at the end of state maintenance at the McKinley–Cibola county line, and the northern terminus is at Interstate 40 (I-40) and NM 371 in Thoreau.

== Major intersections ==
The entire route is in McKinley County.

Location	mi	km	Destinations	Notes
Thoreau	0.000	0.000	I-40 / NM 371 north	Northern terminus; Southern terminus of NM 371; I-40 exit 53
	9.149	14.724	End of state maintenance	Southern terminus, continues south into Cibola County
1.000 mi = 1.609 km; 1.000 km = 0.621 mi
