= Vernon Kerr =

American politician and scientist (1928–2020)

Member of the New Mexico House of Representatives
- In office 1971–1986

Personal details
- Born: Vernon Norman Kerr; March 11, 1928 Gallup, New Mexico, U.S.
- Died: May 28, 2020 (aged 92) Los Alamos, New Mexico, U.S.
- Party: Republican
- Education: New Mexico Highlands University (BS, MS)

Military service
- Branch/service: United States Army
- Battles/wars: Korean War

Vernon Norman Kerr (March 11, 1928 – May 28, 2020) was an American politician and scientist who served as a member of the New Mexico House of Representatives.

== Early life and education ==
Kerr was born in Gallup, New Mexico and graduated from Gallup High School. He received his bachelor's degree in biology and chemistry and his master's degree in organic chemistry from New Mexico Highlands University.

== Career ==
He was drafted into the United States Army during the Korean War. Kerr worked at the Los Alamos National Laboratory in Los Alamos, New Mexico from 1955 to 1987. He lived with his wife and family in Los Alamos, New Mexico. Kerr served in the New Mexico House of Representatives from 1971 until 1986 and was a Republican. He also served on the Los Alamos County Council. Kerr later served as secretary of the New Mexico Department of Finance.

== Death ==
Kerr died in Los Alamos, New Mexico at the age of 92.
