= Buffalo Springs, New Mexico =

- Unincorporated community
- Location within New Mexico Location within the United States
- Coordinates: 35°56′05″N 108°39′14″W
- Country: United States
- State: New Mexico
- County: McKinley
- Elevation: 6,047 ft (1,843 m)
- Time zone: UTC-7 (Mountain (MST))
  - Summer (DST): UTC-6 (MDT)
- Area code: 505
- GNIS feature ID: 902798

Buffalo Springs (also Ayan bito) is an unincorporated community in McKinley County, New Mexico, United States.
