= Chi Chil Tah, New Mexico =

Chi Chil Tah, New Mexico Chéchʼiltah (Navajo)
- Unincorporated community
- Location within New Mexico Location within the United States
- Coordinates: 35°14′58″N 108°54′28″W
- Country: United States
- State: New Mexico
- County: McKinley
- Elevation: 6,762 ft (2,061 m)
- Time zone: UTC-7 (Mountain (MST))
  - Summer (DST): UTC-6 (MDT)
- Area code: 505
- GNIS feature ID: 902802

Chi Chil Tah (Navajo: Chéchʼiltah, also Cheechilgeetho, Gahyazhi, Jones Ranch, Tse Chil Tah) is an unincorporated community in McKinley County, New Mexico, United States.

== Education ==
The Bureau of Indian Affairs operates a K-8 school, Chi Chil'tah Community School. It was given internet access in 2001. That year it had 206 students.

Gallup-McKinley County Schools is the non-BIE school district. Zoned schools are: David Skeet Elementary School in Vanderwagen, Gallup Middle School, and Hiroshi Miyamura High School in Gallup.

== Notable people ==
- Chester Nez, last of the original 29 Navajo Code Talkers.
- Dean Yazzie, Photographer and Musician.
