= Thoreau, New Mexico =

Thoreau, New Mexico Dlǫ́ʼí Yázhí (Navajo)
- Census-designated place
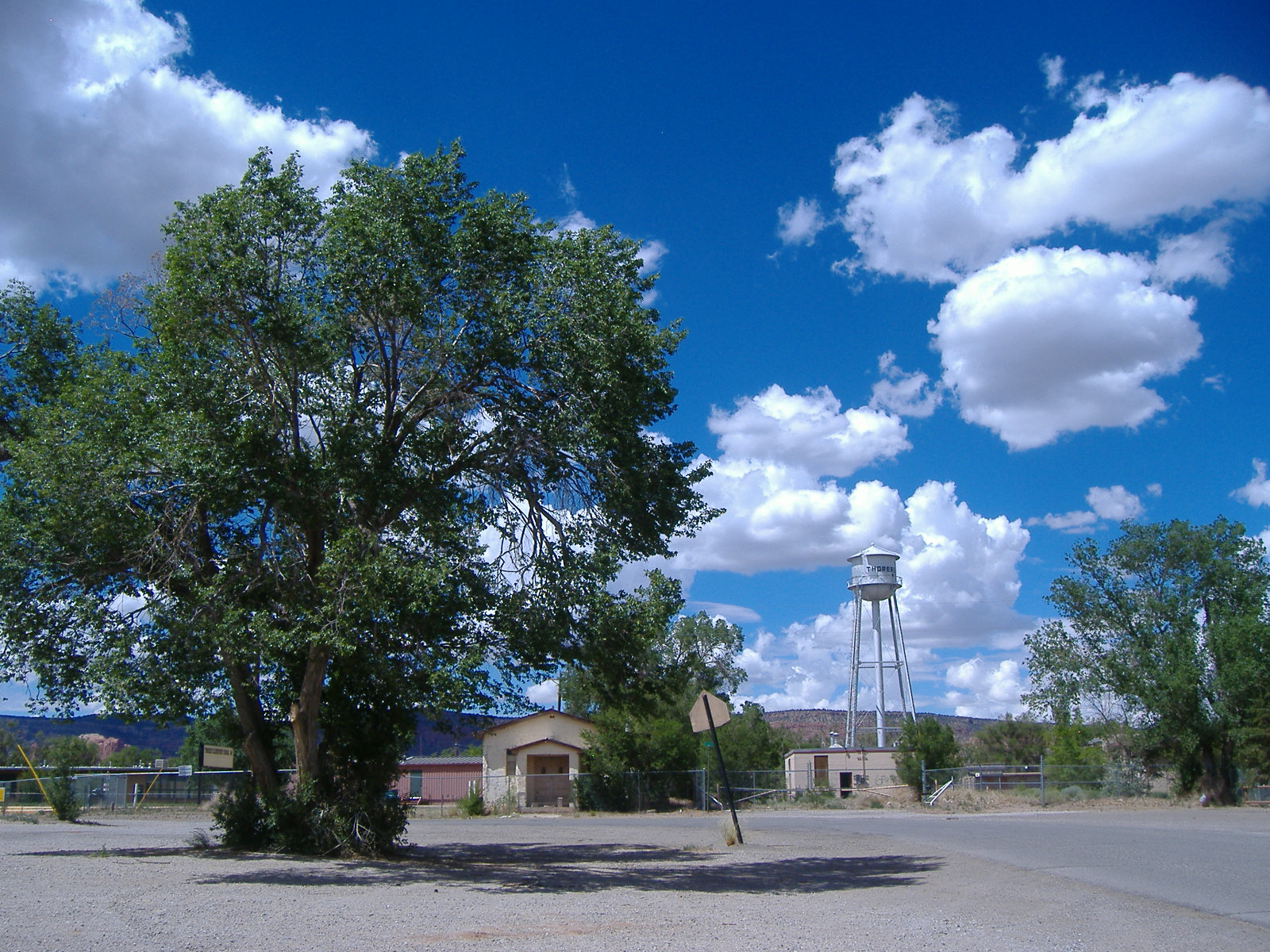
- Thoreau school and water tower

- Location in McKinley County and the state of New Mexico

- Location in the United States
- Coordinates: 35°24′52″N 108°13′25″W
- Country: United States
- State: New Mexico
- County: McKinley

Area
  - Total: 39.49 sq mi (102.3 km^{2})
  - Land: 39.49 sq mi (102.3 km^{2})
  - Water: 0.00 sq mi (0 km^{2})
- Elevation: 7,225 ft (2,202 m)

Population (2020)
  - Total: 2,367
  - Density: 59.94/sq mi (23.14/km^{2})
- Time zone: UTC-7 (MST)
  - Summer (DST): UTC-6 (MDT)
- ZIP code: 87323
- Area code: 505
- FIPS code: 35-77530
- GNIS feature ID: 2410078

Thoreau (Navajo: Dlǫ́ʼí Yázhí) is an unincorporated community and census-designated place (CDP) in McKinley County, New Mexico, United States. The population was 2,367 at the 2020 census, up from 1,865 in 2010. It is majority Native American, primarily of the Navajo Nation, as Thoreau is located within its boundaries.

The settlement, originally called Mitchell, was apparently re-named for Henry David Thoreau when the AT&SF railroad established a station here. A Post office was established in 1899.

Practically all residents pronounce the town's name like "thuh-ROO" (similar to "through" or "threw") and not like "thorough" or "throw." The ZIP code for Thoreau is 87323.

== Geography ==
Thoreau is located in central McKinley County at an altitude of approximately 7,140 feet (2,180 m) above sea level, and is 5 miles (8 km) east of the Continental Divide. Thoreau is located in a broad valley beneath a large escarpment of Entrada sandstone, which marks the southern boundary of the Colorado Plateau to the north. Mount Powell and Castle Rock are landmarks along this escarpment adjacent to Thoreau. The Zuñi Mountains are to the south.

Interstate 40 and the historic U.S. Route 66 pass near and through the community, respectively. The highways lead west 30 miles (48 km) to Gallup, the McKinley county seat, and southeast the same distance to Grants. New Mexico State highways 122, 371, and 612 also pass through or terminate here. Additionally, two natural gas pipelines and a major railway pass through the community.

According to the United States Census Bureau, the Thoreau CDP has a total area of 39.5 square miles (102 km^{2}), all land. The community sits in a valley drained by Mitchell Draw, which runs southeast to the Rio San Jose, part of the Rio Puerco watershed leading to the Rio Grande.

The climate in Thoreau is arid, with the sparse vegetation typical of the region. Common plants include pinyon pine and juniper trees, sagebrush, tumbleweeds, and some short, sparse grasses. The four seasons are well pronounced. Summers are relatively mild, due to Thoreau's high elevation and persistently low humidities. Maximum temperatures do not usually exceed about 33 °C (91 °F). The southwest monsoon brings thunderstorms with frequent lightning in July and August. Autumn is pleasant with warm days and cool nights. Winter is marked by frequent snowstorms, with minimum temperatures sometimes dropping to about −15 °C (5 °F) or colder. Cold, persistent, very high winds are common in spring, usually through much of the month of March.

== Demographics ==
Historical population
Census	Pop.	Note	%±
2000	1,863		—
2010	1,865		0.1%
2020	2,367		26.9%
U.S. Decennial Census

=== 2020 census ===
As of the 2020 census, Thoreau had a population of 2,367. The median age was 31.7 years. 29.9% of residents were under the age of 18 and 10.9% of residents were 65 years of age or older. For every 100 females there were 97.4 males, and for every 100 females age 18 and over there were 94.8 males age 18 and over.

0.0% of residents lived in urban areas, while 100.0% lived in rural areas.

There were 698 households in Thoreau, of which 44.0% had children under the age of 18 living in them. Of all households, 31.9% were married-couple households, 20.8% were households with a male householder and no spouse or partner present, and 37.8% were households with a female householder and no spouse or partner present. About 24.0% of all households were made up of individuals and 8.8% had someone living alone who was 65 years of age or older.

There were 747 housing units, of which 6.6% were vacant. The homeowner vacancy rate was 0.4% and the rental vacancy rate was 0.0%.

Racial composition as of the 2020 census
Race	Number	Percent
White	179	7.6%
Black or African American	10	0.4%
American Indian and Alaska Native	2,016	85.2%
Asian	36	1.5%
Native Hawaiian and Other Pacific Islander	1	0.0%
Some other race	45	1.9%
Two or more races	80	3.4%
Hispanic or Latino (of any race)	137	5.8%

=== 2000 census ===
As of the 2000 census, there were 1,863 people, 532 households, and 405 families residing in the CDP. The population density was 117.1 inhabitants per square mile (45.2/km^{2}). There were 599 housing units at an average density of 37.6 per square mile (14.5/km^{2}). The racial makeup of the CDP was 23.19% White, 0.11% African American, 71.12% Native American, 0.05% Asian, 0.05% Pacific Islander, 3.27% from other races, and 2.20% from two or more races. Hispanic or Latino of any race were 9.34% of the population.

There were 532 households, out of which 49.8% had children under the age of 18 living with them, 50.2% were married couples living together, 21.2% had a female householder with no husband present, and 23.7% were non-families. 19.7% of all households were made up of individuals, and 3.4% had someone living alone who was 65 years of age or older. The average household size was 3.50 and the average family size was 4.16.

In the CDP, the population was spread out, with 40.7% under the age of 18, 10.3% from 18 to 24, 26.6% from 25 to 44, 17.8% from 45 to 64, and 4.6% who were 65 years of age or older. The median age was 24 years. For every 100 females, there were 92.5 males. For every 100 females age 18 and over, there were 90.0 males.

The median income for a household in the CDP was $29,280, and the median income for a family was $29,708. Males had a median income of $29,000 versus $23,092 for females. The per capita income for the CDP was $10,516. About 23.3% of families and 30.2% of the population were below the poverty line, including 40.5% of those under age 18 and 26.9% of those age 65 or over.

== Navajo culture ==
Thoreau is located within the Navajo Nation, which is the largest Native American tribe in the United States. Its culture and history are strong in Thoreau. The Navajo Nation operates a Chapter House here, and many Navajo (or Diné) residents speak their native language. Thoreau is a local trading center for artisans, who create through rug weaving, sandpainting, silversmithing, potterymaking, and making turquoise jewelry. Ancestral Puebloan archaeological sites connecting with Chaco Canyon can be found in and around the town.

== Education ==
Thoreau is served by Gallup-McKinley County Public Schools.

Thoreau supports three public schools in that district: Thoreau Elementary School (grades Kindergarten through 5th), Thoreau Middle School (grades 6th through 8th), and Thoreau High School (grades 9th through 12th) serve the town as well as surrounding rural communities in eastern McKinley County. The public school mascot is the Hawks, and the school colors are green and gold.

The St. Bonaventure Indian School is in Thoreau. It started as a preschool in 1980, added an elementary school, and had high school from 1986 to 2001. It is also known as the Blessed Kateri Tekakwitha Academy, named after the first Native American Catholic saint in North America.

== Religion ==
Many practice the Navajo traditional beliefs: medicine men and Native American Church; in addition, some are also members of several Christian congregations, such as the Saint Bonaventure Catholic mission, The Church of Jesus Christ of Latter-day Saints, and several Protestant denominations including Baptists, Church of Christ, Church of God, and some independent evangelical congregations.

== See also ==
- List of census-designated places in New Mexico
- Casamero Pueblo, archaeological site northeast of Thoreau
