= Purty Rock, New Mexico =

- Census-designated place
- Location within New Mexico Location within the United States
- Coordinates: 35°29′25″N 108°53′45″W
- Country: United States
- State: New Mexico
- County: McKinley

Area
  - Total: 1.17 sq mi (3.02 km^{2})
  - Land: 1.17 sq mi (3.02 km^{2})
- Elevation: 6,365 ft (1,940 m)

Population (2020)
  - Total: 163
  - Density: 139.8/sq mi (53.96/km^{2})
- Time zone: UTC-7 (Mountain (MST))
  - Summer (DST): UTC-6 (MDT)
- ZIP Code: 87319 (Mentmore)
- Area code: 505
- FIPS code: 35-60327
- GNIS feature ID: 2806730

Purty Rock is an unincorporated community and census-designated place (CDP) in McKinley County, New Mexico, United States. As of the 2020 census, it had a population of 163.

== Geography ==
The CDP is in the western part of McKinley County, on the south side of the valley of the Puerco River, a west-flowing tributary of the Little Colorado River. Purty Rock, a 6,925-foot (2,111 m) butte, is 4 miles (6 km) to the south. The CDP includes the unincorporated community of Defiance along a former alignment of U.S. Route 66. Interstate 40 passes through the CDP, with access from Exit 16, 3 miles (5 km) to the east, or from Exit 8, 4 miles (6 km) to the southwest. Gallup, the McKinley county seat, is 9 miles (14 km) to the east.

According to the U.S. Census Bureau, the Purty Rock CDP has an area of 1.17 square miles (3.03 km^{2}), all land.

== Demographics ==
Historical population
Census	Pop.	Note	%±
2020	163		—
U.S. Decennial Census

Purty Rock was first listed as a CDP prior to the 2020 census.

== Education ==
It is in Gallup-McKinley County Public Schools.

Zoned schools are: Tobe Turpen Elementary School, Chief Manuelito Middle School, and Gallup High School.
