= Sundance, New Mexico =

- Census-designated place
- Location within New Mexico Location within the United States
- Coordinates: 35°30′09″N 108°38′24″W
- Country: United States
- State: New Mexico
- County: McKinley

Area
  - Total: 3.47 sq mi (9.00 km^{2})
  - Land: 3.47 sq mi (9.00 km^{2})
  - Water: 0 sq mi (0.00 km^{2})
- Elevation: 6,847 ft (2,087 m)

Population (2020)
  - Total: 760
  - Density: 218.7/sq mi (84.44/km^{2})
- Time zone: UTC-7 (Mountain (MST))
  - Summer (DST): UTC-6 (MDT)
- ZIP Code: 87311 (Church Rock)
- Area code: 505
- FIPS code: 35-75605
- GNIS feature ID: 2806734

Sundance is an unincorporated community and census-designated place (CDP) in McKinley County, New Mexico, United States. As of the 2020 census, it had a population of 760.

== Geography ==
The community is in the western part of the county and is bordered to the northwest by Gallup, the county seat, to the northeast by Church Rock, and to the east by federal land associated with Fort Wingate. Interstate 40 passes through the northernmost part of Sundance, with the closest access from Exit 26 (State Road 118), 2 miles (3 km) to the west in Gallup.

According to the U.S. Census Bureau, the Sundance CDP has an area of 3.48 square miles (9.01 km^{2}), all land. The community slopes north toward the valley of the Puerco River, which runs west to join the Little Colorado River in Arizona.

== Demographics ==
Historical population
Census	Pop.	Note	%±
2020	760		—
U.S. Decennial Census

Sundance was first listed as a CDP prior to the 2020 census.

== Education ==
It is in Gallup-McKinley County Public Schools.
