= Wild Horse Casino (Jicarilla Apache Nation) =

Casino and hotel in Dulce, New Mexico

Coordinates: 36°56′7.1″N 106°59′12.9″W

Wild Horse Casino, closed about 5 years ago (2020)
- Interactive map of Wild Horse Casino, closed about 5 years ago (2020)
- Location: Dulce, New Mexico
- No. of rooms: 41
- Casino type: Land-based
- Owner: Apache Nugget Corporation (Jicarilla Apache Nation)
- Website: https://wildhorsecasinoandhotel.com

The Wild Horse Casino is located in the town of Dulce, New Mexico, at the junction of Highway 64 and Hawks Drive. The casino is operated by the Apache Nugget Corporation (ANC) which oversees all gaming activity for the Jicarilla Apache Nation. ANC is a for-profit Federally Chartered Section 17 Corporation owned by the Jicarilla Apache Nation. It is located in Dulce, New Mexico, the headquarters for the Nation. ANC has been in existence since 2003. Closed about 2020.

== History ==
The Wild Horse Casino re-opened on February 5, 2007, after a complete renovation and expansion.

The casino remains one of the main economic drivers of the area, which closes at night. It closed in March 2020 for a time in response to coronavirus.

== Features and facilities ==
The Wild Horse Casino has approximately 184 slot machines, 1 Roulette Table, 2 Blackjack Tables, and a Poker Room. In addition, it offers a restaurant, gift/smoke shop, and a player's club.

It has a 41-room hotel.

== See also ==
- List of casinos in New Mexico
