= White Cliffs, New Mexico =

- Census-designated place
- Location within New Mexico Location within the United States
- Coordinates: 35°32′56″N 108°39′52″W
- Country: United States
- State: New Mexico
- County: McKinley

Area
  - Total: 0.43 sq mi (1.11 km^{2})
  - Land: 0.43 sq mi (1.11 km^{2})
  - Water: 0 sq mi (0.00 km^{2})
- Elevation: 6,595 ft (2,010 m)

Population (2020)
  - Total: 371
  - Density: 865.4/sq mi (334.13/km^{2})
- Time zone: UTC-7 (Mountain (MST))
  - Summer (DST): UTC-6 (MDT)
- ZIP Code: 87311 (Church Rock)
- Area code: 505
- FIPS code: 35-84505
- GNIS feature ID: 2806738

White Cliffs is an unincorporated community and census-designated place (CDP) in McKinley County, New Mexico, United States. As of the 2020 census, it had a population of 371.

== Geography ==
The community is in the western part of the county, 5 miles (8 km) northeast of Gallup, the county seat, and 4 miles (6 km) west of Church Rock. The CDP takes its name from a set of 600-foot-high (180 m) cliffs that rise 2 miles (3 km) to the north.

According to the U.S. Census Bureau, the White Cliffs CDP has an area of 0.43 square miles (1.11 km^{2}), all land. The community is bordered to the east by the Puerco River, which flows southwest into Gallup and ultimately joins the Little Colorado River near Holbrook, Arizona.

== Demographics ==
Historical population
Census	Pop.	Note	%±
2020	371		—
U.S. Decennial Census

White Cliffs was first listed as a CDP prior to the 2020 census.

== Education ==
It is in Gallup-McKinley County Public Schools.
