= Williams Acres, New Mexico =

- Census-designated place
- Location within New Mexico Location within the United States
- Coordinates: 35°29′43″N 108°52′31″W
- Country: United States
- State: New Mexico
- County: McKinley

Area
  - Total: 0.81 sq mi (2.09 km^{2})
  - Land: 0.81 sq mi (2.09 km^{2})
  - Water: 0 sq mi (0.00 km^{2})
- Elevation: 6,395 ft (1,949 m)

Population (2020)
  - Total: 491
  - Density: 608.8/sq mi (235.06/km^{2})
- Time zone: UTC-7 (Mountain (MST))
  - Summer (DST): UTC-6 (MDT)
- ZIP Codes: 87319 (Mentmore); 87301 (Gallup)
- Area code: 505
- FIPS code: 35-85230
- GNIS feature ID: 2806740

Williams Acres is an unincorporated community and census-designated place (CDP) in McKinley County, New Mexico, United States. As of the 2020 census, it had a population of 491.

== Geography ==
The CDP is in the county's western part, in the Puerco River valley, a west-flowing tributary of the Little Colorado. The community is bordered to the south by Interstate 40 and to the north by the Gallup Subdivision of the BNSF Railway. New Mexico State Road 118 (Historic Route 66) runs through the northern side of the community. It is 10 miles (16 km) west of Gallup, the county seat, and 15 miles (24 km) northeast of Lupton, Arizona.

According to the U.S. Census Bureau, the CDP has an area of 0.81 square miles (2.10 km^{2}), all land. The Puerco River flows just to the north of the CDP limits.

== Demographics ==
Historical population
Census	Pop.	Note	%±
2020	491		—
U.S. Decennial Census

Williams Acres was first listed as a CDP before the 2020 census.

== Education ==
It is in Gallup-McKinley County Public Schools.

Tobe Turpen Elementary School, Chief Manualito Middle School, and Gallup High School are zoned schools.
