= Chester Nez =

American World War II veteran (1921–2014)

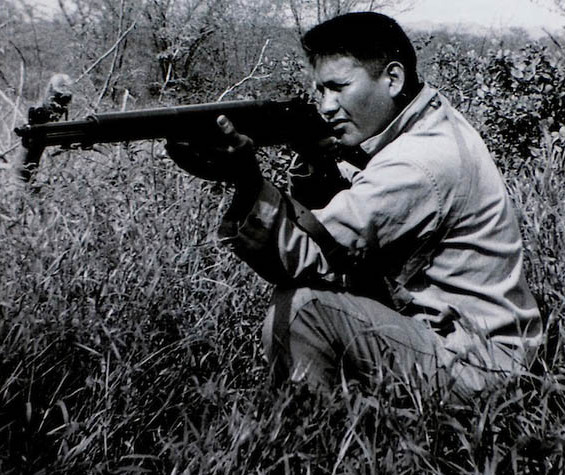
- Chester Nez during World War II
- Born: January 23, 1921; Chi Chil Tah, New Mexico, U.S.
- Died: June 4, 2014 (aged 93); Albuquerque, New Mexico, U.S.
- Education: University of Kansas
- Known for: Being the last survivor of the original 29 Navajo Code Talkers from World War II
- Awards: Congressional Gold Medal

Chester Nez (January 23, 1921 – June 4, 2014) was an American veteran of World War II. He was the last surviving original Navajo code talker who served in the United States Marine Corps during the war.

== Early years ==
Nez was born in Chi Chil Tah, New Mexico, to the Navajo Dibéłizhiní (Black Sheep Clan) of the Tsénahabiłnii (Sleeping Rock People). He was raised during a time of difficult relations between the U.S. government and the Navajo Nation. His mother died when he was only three years old. Nez recalled children often being taken from reservations, sent to boarding schools, and forbidden to speak the Navajo language. At eight years old, Nez was sent to a school run by the Bureau of Indian Affairs. His English given name, Chester, after US president Chester A. Arthur, was assigned then. It was from one of the government-run boarding schools, in Tuba City, Arizona, that Nez was recruited into the Marine Corps.

== Code talker ==
Nez kept his decision to enlist from his family. He and 28 other Navajos formed Recruit Training Platoon 382 at Marine Corps Base San Diego in May 1942. The 29 who graduated from boot camp, including Nez, were then assigned to the Camp Elliot, California, where they were tasked with creating a code for secure voice tactical (battlefield) communications. At the time, tactical radios were not equipped, as they are today, with encryption/decryption technology, allowing the enemy to listen to radio traffic, often with disastrous results. The Navajo language was chosen because its complex syntax and phonology made it exceedingly difficult to learn as a second language, and it had no written form. Nez stated the developers used everyday words, in order to easily memorize and retain them. In 1942, he was among the code talkers to be shipped out to Guadalcanal, where they worked in teams of two: one to send and receive, the other to operate the radio and listen for errors. Nez also fought in Bougainville, Guam, Angaur and Peleliu. He was honorably discharged as a private first class in 1945 and returned to serve stateside in the Korean War from which he was discharged as a corporal.

== Post-military life ==
At a press conference with Judith Avila.

From 1946 to 1952, Nez attended the University of Kansas to study commercial arts, but by 1952 discontinued his studies after having exhausted funding from his G.I. Bill; he was awarded an honorary bachelor's degree by the Kansas University College of Liberal Arts and Science on Veterans Day, 2012.

Following his military service, he worked as a painter for 25 years at a V.A. hospital in Albuquerque. In 2011, he wrote the memoir Code Talker: The First and Only Memoir by One of the Original Navajo Code Talkers of WWII with Judith Avila.

== Congressional Gold Medal ==
On July 26, 2001, Nez was one of the five living code talkers who received the Congressional Gold Medal from President George W. Bush:

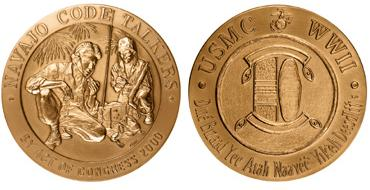

Today, we marked a moment of shared history and shared victory. We recall a story that all Americans can celebrate and every American should know. It is a story of ancient people called to serve in a modern war. It is a story of one unbreakable oral code of the Second World War, messages travelling by field radio on Iwo Jima in the very language heard across the Colorado plateau centuries ago. – President George W. Bush.

== Death ==
Nez died on June 4, 2014, from kidney failure in Albuquerque, aged 93.
