= Chee B. Benally =

Diné painter and illustrator

- Born: June 6, 1947 (age 79); Black Rock, New Mexico, US

Chee B. Benally (born June 6, 1947) is a Diné painter and illustrator from Black Rock, New Mexico. He utilizes oil, acrylic, watercolor, pastel, and charcoal for his works. Benally has exhibited his artwork across the country and has works in the public collections of several institutions including the Heritage Center at Red Cloud Indian School and the Inter-Tribal Indian Ceremonials.

Benally attended Thoreau Boarding School and public schools in Gallup, New Mexico, graduating from Gallup High School in 1966. He then attended Engineering Drafting School in Denver before earning a B.A. from Nebraska Wesleyan University.
