= Timothy Bedah =

American painter

- Born: October 4, 1945; Tohatchi, New Mexico, US
- Died: June 18, 2017 (aged 71); Albuquerque, New Mexico, US
- Burial place: Tohatchi Cemetery, Tohatchi, New Mexico
- Citizenship: Navajo Nation, American
- Occupations: painter, goldsmith

Timothy Bedah (October 4, 1945 – June 18, 2017) was a Navajo American painter and goldsmith born in Tohatchi, New Mexico. He exhibited his work across the United States. Bedah is known for his silver and gold jewelry, including rings, bracelets, and buckles, for which he won a number of awards.

Bedah was born to Edward Bedah (Plains Indian, Kiiyanii clan) and Thelma Begay (Navajo, Todacheenie clan). He was a promising art student as a child, excelling in painting and music. After graduating from Gallup High School in 1965, he was a guitarist and drummer in a country music band.

He worked for a time at Carson's Trading Post in Gallup, New Mexico, where he learned how to silversmith. In the mid-1970s he began working with gold.

Bedah died in 2017 in Albuquerque, New Mexico.
