= Sandia Resort and Casino =

Hotel in United States

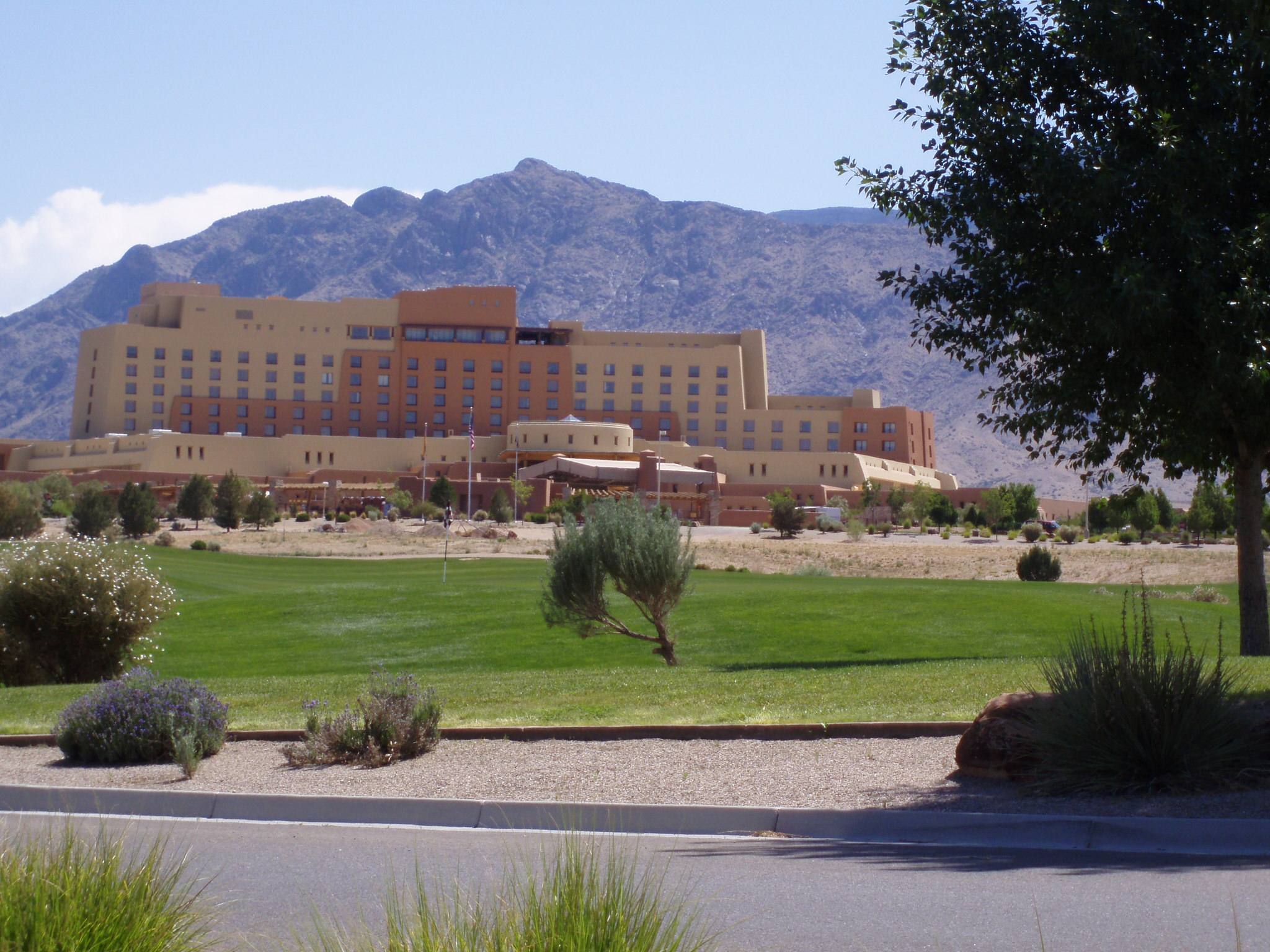
- Sandia Resort and Casino
- Interactive map of Sandia Resort and Casino
- Location: Albuquerque, New Mexico; 30 Rainbow Rd NE Albuquerque, NM 87113; 35°12′24″N 106°34′1″W
- Opened: 2001; 25 years ago
- No. of rooms: 228
- Gaming space: 110,000 sq ft (10,000 m^{2})
- Owner: Sandia Pueblo
- Renovated in: 2005 (hotel addition), 2014
- Website: Sandia Resort & Casino

Sandia Resort & Casino is a casino and hotel complex on the Sandia Pueblo reservation near Albuquerque, New Mexico. It includes 110,000 sq ft (10,000 m^{2}) of gaming space, an outdoor amphitheater, and a convention center.

The casino has more than 1,940 slot machines. Table games include Blackjack, Craps, Pai Gow Poker, Baccarat and Roulette. They even have Poker and Bingo.

== History ==
The casino opened in 1994. In 2005, a 7-story hotel was added, also an 18-hole golf course and a spa. They have 5 restaurants, Council Room Restaurant, Golf Club Grill, Mountainside, Kiva Koffee and Delis. Sandia also has 3 bars, Tlur Pa Lounge, Ba Shie Lounge and the Pool Bar & Grill. Plus they have 2 that offer both, Sandia Sportsbook and Bien Shur.

== See also ==
- List of casinos in New Mexico
