= White Cliffs building =

Mansion in Massachusetts

The White Cliffs is a building at 167 Main Street in Northborough, Massachusetts. Designed by architect Benjamin Hammett Seabury, The Cliffs was built as a summer home for Daniel B. Wesson and his family and completed in 1886. The mansion has had a variety of uses including a home, a restaurant, and an event venue, before being purchased by the Town of Northborough in 2016.

== History ==
=== Residence ===
Daniel Wesson had met his future wife Cynthia Hawes in Northborough in the 1840s. Cynthia wanted a summer home built on land her parents had owned, which was completed in 1886. The construction of the elaborate mansion cost $300,000 and involved European craftsmen. The Wessons used Northborough as a summer home until 1901.

Alfred Thomas purchased the property in 1910, using it as a summer home until 1926.

=== Restaurants and event venue ===
From 1946 to 1953, the Northboro Manor restaurant operated on the property. A $2 million renovation of the property as a private club was planned in 1953, but the project lacked funding. The property was sold that year to the Tomaiolo family, who operated the White Cliffs Restaurant and Function Facility until 1985. In 1969, an addition was built. In 1985, the property was sold to the and used as a function space without a restaurant until being listed for sale in 2014.

=== Purchase by Town of Northborough (2016–present) ===
At a 2016 Town Meeting, Northborough residents approved the purchase of the White Cliffs mansion using $2.4 million in Community Preservation Act funds, preventing its demolition by a 218-67 vote.

At Day Four of the 2025 Annual Town Meeting, Northborough voters approved $93,940 from the Community Preservation Fund towards a first phase related to the removal of 1960s additions to the mansion by a vote of 91-29. The same meeting rejected an article placing an historic deed restriction on and authorizing the Select Board to lease or sell the mansion by a vote of 85-29.

The Town is expected to consider a lease of the mansion to Connecticut-based venue operator Elegant Banquets LLC at a Special Town Meeting on November 3, 2025. On April 27, 2026, Northborough's Town Meeting approved three articles to allow Elegant Banquets to move forward with their planned renovations. The planned reservations will restore the mansion to its 1880s design and construct a new cocktail room and 5000 square foot ballroom. As of May 2026, renovations are expected to be completed in fall 2027.
