= Fire Rock Navajo Casino =

Casino in Church Rock, New Mexico

Coordinates: 35.532°N 108.628°W

- Interactive map of Fire Rock Navajo Casino
- Location: 249 Historic 66 Church Rock, New Mexico 87311
- Opened: November 19, 2008
- Gaming space: 64,000 sq ft (5,900 m^{2})
- Notable restaurants: Cheii Grill & Pub; Food Court
- Casino type: Land-based
- Owner: Navajo Nation Gaming Enterprise
- Website: firerocknavajocasino.com

Fire Rock Navajo Casino is a Navajo casino located in the town of Church Rock, New Mexico, on historic Route 66. The casino opened November 19, 2008, and is one of four operated by overseers Navajo Nation Gaming Enterprise (NNGE), which includes Flowing Water, Northern Edge and Twin Arrows casinos.

The casino has approximately 1,100 slot machines, 1 roulette Table, 7 blackjack Tables. In addition, it offers a restaurant, gift/smoke shop, and a player's club.
