= New Mexico State Road 371 =

State highway in New Mexico, United States

State Road 371

Route information
- Maintained by NMDOT
- Length: 107.650 mi (173.246 km)

Major junctions
- South end: I-40 / NM 612 in Thoreau
- North end: US 64 in Farmington

Location
- Country: United States
- State: New Mexico
- Counties: McKinley, San Juan

Highway system
- New Mexico State Highway System; Interstate; US; State; Scenic
← NM 370	→ NM 372

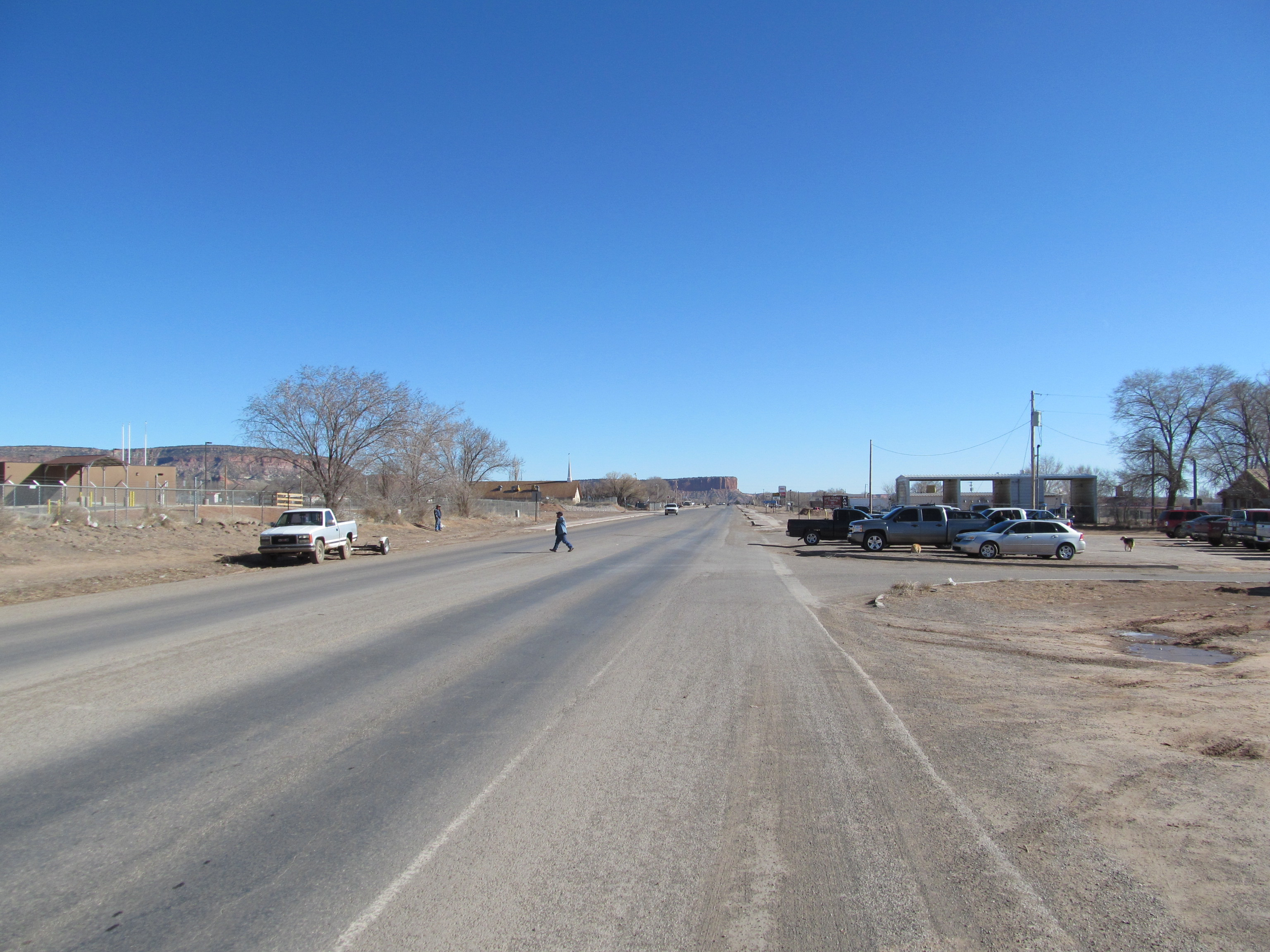
NM 371 in Thoreau.

State Road 371 (NM 371) is a 107.65-mile-long (173.25 km) state highway in the US state of New Mexico. NM 371's southern terminus is at Interstate 40 (I-40) and NM 612 in Thoreau, and the northern terminus is at U.S. Route 64 (US 64) in Farmington.

== Major intersections ==
County	Location	mi	km	Destinations	Notes
McKinley	Thoreau	0.000	0.000	NM 612 south	Continuation beyond I-40; northern terminus of NM 612
McKinley	Thoreau	0.000	0.000	I-40 – Albuquerque	Southern terminus; I-40 exit 53
McKinley	Thoreau	0.070	0.113	NM 122 – Grants, Gallup	Former US 66
San Juan	Farmington	106.347	171.149	US 64 / NM 5001 (Murray Drive) – Aztec, Bloomfield, Shiprock	Northern terminus; road continues east as Piñon Street
1.000 mi = 1.609 km; 1.000 km = 0.621 mi: Route transition
