= Gallup High School =

Public high school in Gallup, New Mexico

Location
- 1005 Rico St. Gallup, New Mexico; United States; 35.4972°N 108.8174°W

Information
- Type: Public high school
- Teaching staff: 53.62 (FTE)
- Grades: 9-12
- Enrollment: 884 (2018–19)
- Student to teacher ratio: 16.49
- Colors: Black, orange
- Athletics: NMAA; District 1 AAAA
- Mascot: Bengal
- Website: Gallup High School

Gallup High School (GHS) is a public high school in Gallup, New Mexico. It is the largest high school in the Gallup-McKinley County School District.

For over 50 years, a partnership with the UNM Extension Division has brought students to Gallup High School for part-time instruction in college-level courses.

== History ==
Wendell Hendricks became the principal in 1970.

The school's campus is relatively new, as GHS moved to its current location in 1998. The old campus became known as Gallup Junior High School, which housed 8th and 9th grade students from 1998 to 2008.

In the 2008–2009 school year, Gallup started splitting their 9th and 10th grade students with cross-town Miyamura High School. The Gallup High School attendance boundary after the split is Gallup's westside, and areas located west and north of town.

In addition to portions of Gallup, the school serves Crestview, Defiance, Manuelito, Mentmore, Purty Rock, Rock Springs, Tse Bonito, and Ya-ta-hey, as well as a small section of Catalpa Canyon.

== Sports and activities ==
Gallup High School is a member of NMAA's District 1-4A, and is highly competitive in girls' and boys' basketball, girls' dance team, and boys' and girls' cross country. District 1-4A includes Miyamura High School (Gallup, NM), Shiprock High School (Shiprock, NM), Kirtland Central High School (Kirtland, NM), Aztec High School, and Bloomfield High School (Bloomfield, NM).

Sport	Class	Year(s)
Baseball	N/A	1953
Basketball state champions (girls)	5A, 4A	1994, 1997, 2011, 2021
Cross country state champions (boys)	5A	1983, 1984, 1985, 1986, 1987, 1988, 1989, 1990, 1991, 1992, 1993, 1994, 1999, 2005, 2007
Cross country state champions (girls)	4A	1988, 1989, 1990, 1993, 1996, 1997, 1998, 1999
Dance/drill	4A	2011

== Notable alumni ==
- Jim Abeita, artist
- Anthony Allison, member of the New Mexico House of Representatives
- Timothy Bedah, painter and goldsmith
- Chee B. Benally, artist
- Earl Insley, college football coach
- Vernon Kerr, member of the New Mexico House of Representatives
- James B. Lewis, former state treasurer of New Mexico (1985–1991, 2007–2015), first African-American elected to statewide office in New Mexico
- Taylor Ramirez, educator, school administrator, and former collegiate athlete. Ramirez was a standout two-sport athlete at Gallup High School, earning all-area recognition as a quarterback and all-district honors in baseball. He continued his baseball career at Eastern New Mexico University, where he earned a Bachelor of Science in biology (Pre-Med) and later a Master of Education in educational leadership. Ramirez subsequently became an assistant principal and athletic director at Miyamura High School in Gallup, New Mexico, where he has overseen student achievement, school operations, and athletic programs.
- Nick Romero, physical therapist and entrepreneur. Romero graduated as valedictorian of Gallup High School, was a three-sport athlete, and later played collegiate baseball. He earned a bachelor's degree in kinesiology from New Mexico State University and a Doctor of Physical Therapy degree from the University of New Mexico. He is the founder and owner of Walk-Off Performance and Rehabilitation Physical Therapy in Albuquerque, New Mexico.
