= McKinley County, New Mexico =

County in New Mexico, United States

- County
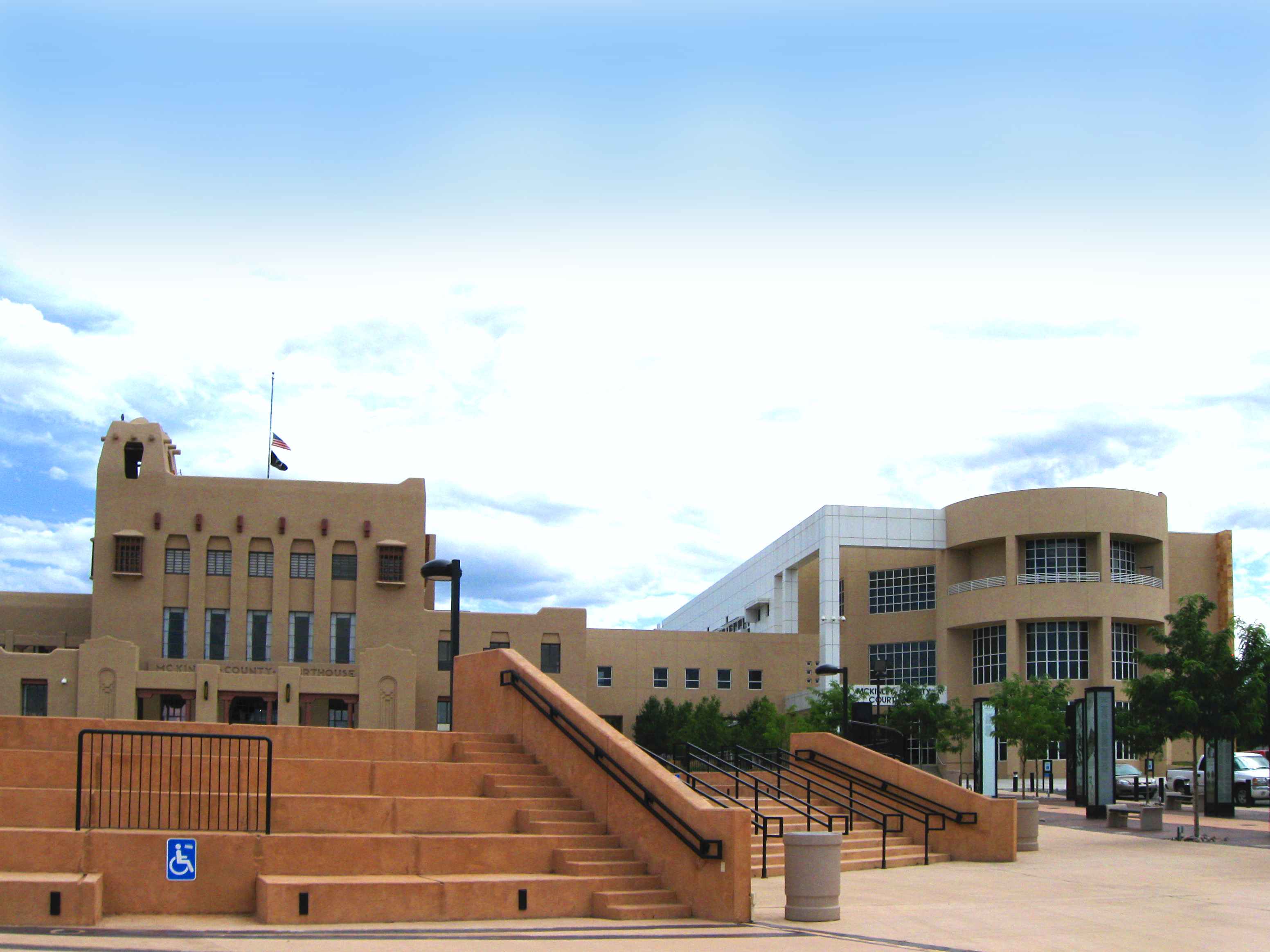
- McKinley County Courthouse in Gallup

- Location within the U.S. state of New Mexico
- Coordinates: 35°35′N 108°16′W
- Country: United States
- State: New Mexico
- Founded: January 1, 1901
- Named for: William McKinley
- Seat: Gallup
- Largest city: Gallup

Area
  - Total: 5,455.5 sq mi (14,130 km^{2})
  - Land: 5,450 sq mi (14,100 km^{2})
  - Water: 5.5 sq mi (14 km^{2}) 0.1%

Population (2020)
  - Total: 72,902
  - Estimate (2025): 68,119 ▼
  - Density: 13/sq mi (5.0/km^{2})
- Time zone: UTC−7 (Mountain)
  - Summer (DST): UTC−6 (MDT)
- Congressional districts: 2nd, 3rd
- Website: www.co.mckinley.nm.us

McKinley County is a county in the northwestern section of the U.S. state of New Mexico. As of the 2020 United States census, its population was 72,902. Its county seat is Gallup. The county was created in 1901 and named for President William McKinley. McKinley County is Gallup's micropolitan statistical area.

== Geography ==
According to the U.S. Census Bureau, the county has a total area of 5,455 square miles (14,130 km^{2}), of which 5.5 sq mi (14 km^{2}) (0.1%) are covered by water.

=== Adjacent counties ===
- San Juan County - north
- Sandoval County - east
- Cibola County - south
- Apache County, Arizona - west

=== Major highways ===
- I-40
  - I-40 BL (Gallup)
- US 491
- NM 36
- NM 53
- NM 118
- NM 122
- NM 264
- NM 371
- NM 400
- NM 412
- NM 509
- NM 564
- NM 566
- NM 602
- NM 605
- NM 608
- NM 609
- NM 610
- NM 612

=== National protected areas ===
- Chaco Culture National Historical Park (part)
- Cibola National Forest (part)

== Demographics ==
Historical population
Census	Pop.	Note	%±
1910	12,963		—
1920	13,731		5.9%
1930	20,643		50.3%
1940	23,641		14.5%
1950	27,451		16.1%
1960	37,209		35.5%
1970	43,208		16.1%
1980	56,449		30.6%
1990	60,686		7.5%
2000	74,798		23.3%
2010	71,492		−4.4%
2020	72,902		2.0%
2025 (est.)	68,119	▼	−6.6%
U.S. Decennial Census; 1790–1960 1900–1990; 1990–2000 2010

=== 2020 census ===
As of the 2020 census, the county had a population of 72,902. The median age was 34.4 years; 27.7% of residents were under the age of 18 and 13.4% were 65 years of age or older.

For every 100 females there were 94.0 males, and for every 100 females age 18 and over there were 91.2 males age 18 and over.

The 2020 redistricting data reported the county was 10.5% White, 0.5% Black or African American, 78.1% American Indian and Alaska Native, 1.3% Asian, 0.0% Native Hawaiian and Pacific Islander, 4.3% from some other race, and 5.3% from two or more races, with 11.8% of residents identifying as Hispanic or Latino of any race.

33.5% of residents lived in urban areas, while 66.5% lived in rural areas.

There were 22,659 households in the county, of which 41.3% had children under the age of 18 living with them, 35.5% had a female householder with no spouse or partner present, 23.1% were made up of individuals, and 9.0% had someone living alone who was 65 years of age or older.

There were 25,057 housing units, of which 9.6% were vacant; among occupied housing units, 68.3% were owner-occupied and 31.7% were renter-occupied. The homeowner vacancy rate was 0.7% and the rental vacancy rate was 6.0%.

The most reported ancestries were:

- Navajo (61.9%)
- Zuni (9.9%)
- Mexican (9%)
- English (2.8%)
- German (2.3%)
- Irish (2.1%)
- Spanish (1.3%)
- Filipino (1%)

=== Racial and ethnic composition ===
McKinley County, New Mexico – Racial composition Note: the US Census treats Hispanic/Latino as an ethnic category. This table excludes Latinos from the racial categories and assigns them to a separate category. Hispanics/Latinos may be of any race.
Race (NH = Non-Hispanic)	% 2020	% 2010	% 2000	Pop 2020	Pop 2010	Pop 2000
White alone (NH)	8.2%	10.3%	11.9%	5,946	7,384	8,902
Black alone (NH)	0.4%	0.4%	0.4%	323	317	287
American Indian alone (NH)	76%	73.3%	73.2%	55,401	52,402	54,742
Asian alone (NH)	1.3%	0.8%	0.4%	935	542	327
Pacific Islander alone (NH)	0%	0%	0%	34	17	25
Other race alone (NH)	0.2%	0.1%	0.1%	127	51	46
Multiracial (NH)	2.1%	1.8%	1.6%	1,525	1,306	1,193
Hispanic/Latino (any race)	11.8%	13.3%	12.4%	8,611	9,473	9,276

=== 2010 census ===
As of the 2010 census, 71,492 people, 21,968 households, and 16,219 families resided in the county. The population density was 13.1 inhabitants per square mile (5.1/km^{2}). The 25,813 housing units had an average density of 4.7/sq mi (1.8/km^{2}). The racial makeup of the county was 75.5% Native American, 15.2% White, 0.8% Asian, 0.5% Black or African American, 4.9% from other races, and 3.1% from two or more races. Those of Hispanic or Latino origin made up 13.3% of the population.

Of the 21,968 households, 46.2% had children under 18 living with them, 40.8% were married couples living together, 24.5% had a female householder with no husband present, 26.2% were not families, and 22.4% of all households were made up of individuals. The average household size was 3.22, and the average family size was 3.82. The median age was 30.7 years.

The median income for a household in the county was $31,335 and for a family was $37,345. Males had a median income of $31,527 versus $26,236 for females. The per capita income for the county was $12,932. About 26.6% of families and 33.4% of the population were below the poverty line, including 43.0% of those under 18 and 31.3% of those 65 or over.

=== 2000 census ===
As of the 2000 census, 74,798 people, 21,476 households, and 16,686 families were living in the county. The population density was 14 people per square mile (5.4 people/km^{2}). The 26,718 housing units had an average density of 5 units per square mile (1.9 units/km^{2}). The racial makeup of the county was 74.72% Native American, 16.39% White, 0.46% Asian, 0.40% African American, 0.04% Pacific Islander, 5.47% from other races, and 2.52% from two or more races. About 12.40% of the population were Hispanics or Latinos of any race.

Of the 21,476 households, 46.0% had children under 18 living with them, 47.7% were married couples living together, 22.7% had a female householder with no husband present, and 22.3% were not families. About 19.5% of all households were made up of individuals, and 5.3% had someone living alone who was 65 or older. The average household size was 3.44, and the average family size was 3.99.

In the county, the age distribution was 38.0% under 18, 9.7% from 18 to 24, 27.8% from 25 to 44, 17.6% from 45 to 64, and 6.9% who were 65 or older. The median age was 27 years. For every 100 females, there were 93.50 males. For every 100.0 females 18 and over, there were 89.3 males.

The median income for a household in the county was $25,005, and for a family was $26,806. Males had a median income of $26,963 versus $21,014 for females. The per capita income for the county was $9,872. About 31.9% of families and 36.1% of the population were below the poverty line, including 42.3% of those under 18 and 31.5% of those 65 or over. The county's per capita income makes it one of the poorest counties in the United States.

McKinley County is one of only 38 county-level census divisions of the United States where the most spoken language is not English and one of only three where it is neither English nor Spanish; 45.75% of the population speak Navajo at home, followed by English at 38.87%, Zuñi at 9.03%, and Spanish at 5.72%.

== Communities ==
=== City ===
- Gallup (county seat)

=== Unincorporated communities ===
- Becenti
- Buffalo Springs
- Chi Chil Tah
- Continental Divide
- Manuelito
- Rehoboth
- Smith Lake
- Whitehorse

=== Census-designated places ===
For purposes of census-data collection, organization and analysis, the United States Census Bureau has devised 44 census-designated places since 1980 within McKinley County.

- Black Hat
- Black Rock
- Bluewater
- Borrego Pass
- Brimhall Nizhoni
- Catalpa Canyon
- Church Rock
- Continental Divide
- Crestview
- Crownpoint
- Crystal (part)
- Fort Wingate
- Gamerco
- Haystack
- Homer C Jones
- Iyanbito
- Jamestown
- McGaffey
- Nakaibito
- Navajo
- Ojo Encino
- Pinedale
- Pinehaven
- Prewitt
- Pueblo Pintado
- Purty Rock
- Ramah
- Red Rock Ranch
- Rock Springs
- Sagar
- Sundance
- Thoreau
- Timberlake (part)
- Tohatchi
- Tse Bonito
- Twin Lakes
- Vanderwagen
- White Cliffs
- Williams Acres
- Yah-ta-hey
- Zuni Pueblo

== Education ==
Locally controlled public schools in most of McKinley County are run by Gallup-McKinley County Schools, the local school district, and include Crownpoint High School, Gallup Central High School, Gallup High School, Hiroshi Miyamura High School, Navajo Pine High School, Ramah Middle / High School, Thoreau High School, Tohatchi High School, and Tse Yi Gai High School. Areas in and around the Zuni reservation are in the Zuni Public School District, which operates Zuni High School.

Two Bureau of Indian Education (BIE) boarding schools are in the Fort Wingate area: Wingate Elementary School, and Wingate High School. The BIE also operates a K-8 school, Pueblo Pintado Community School, in Pueblo Pintado, and a K-6 school, Baca /Dlo'Ay Azhi Community School. Additionally, a tribal school affiliated with the BIE, Ch'ooshgai Community School, is located in Tohatchi.

== Politics ==
During its early history from 1912 to 1928, McKinley County voted for the Republican candidate in every presidential election. From 1932 onward, the county, with its large Native American majority, has strongly backed Democratic candidates in all but three presidential elections that were national landslides for the Republican Party.

Democratic strength in the county lies in most of Gallup and the Navajo and Zuni Reservations, which cover a large majority of the county's land area. The community of Ramah has previously been one of the only Republican-leaning parts of the county. In 2024 the county saw the strongest shift toward the Republican party of any county in New Mexico, along with Guadalupe, Mora, and Rio Arriba Counties. Parts of southern Gallup and the Thoreau area flipped to a Republican majority, and many parts of the Navajo and Zuni Reservations experienced shifts as well along with most other rural areas.

United States presidential election results for McKinley County, New Mexico
Year	Republican		Democratic		Third party(ies)	
Year	No.	%	No.	%	No.	%
1912	264	36.07%	224	30.60%	244	33.33%
1916	669	54.57%	550	44.86%	7	0.57%
1920	1,525	60.02%	989	38.92%	27	1.06%
1924	1,653	51.24%	1,150	35.65%	423	13.11%
1928	2,075	62.22%	1,247	37.39%	13	0.39%
1932	1,373	39.35%	2,096	60.07%	20	0.57%
1936	1,404	35.60%	2,526	64.05%	14	0.35%
1940	1,701	40.19%	2,525	59.66%	6	0.14%
1944	1,547	41.14%	2,210	58.78%	3	0.08%
1948	2,109	40.96%	2,995	58.17%	45	0.87%
1952	3,091	49.80%	3,097	49.90%	19	0.31%
1956	4,450	56.97%	3,331	42.64%	30	0.38%
1960	4,262	43.08%	5,599	56.60%	32	0.32%
1964	2,965	29.65%	6,913	69.13%	122	1.22%
1968	4,376	45.71%	4,491	46.91%	706	7.37%
1972	5,366	49.74%	5,124	47.49%	299	2.77%
1976	4,617	39.83%	6,856	59.14%	120	1.04%
1980	7,329	56.66%	4,869	37.64%	736	5.69%
1984	6,557	44.78%	7,915	54.05%	171	1.17%
1988	5,694	36.81%	9,595	62.04%	178	1.15%
1992	4,720	30.39%	9,405	60.56%	1,406	9.05%
1996	4,470	28.79%	10,124	65.21%	932	6.00%
2000	5,070	31.93%	10,281	64.75%	528	3.33%
2004	7,351	35.64%	13,051	63.28%	221	1.07%
2008	6,382	27.50%	16,572	71.41%	253	1.09%
2012	5,546	25.29%	15,841	72.24%	542	2.47%
2016	5,104	23.52%	13,576	62.55%	3,023	13.93%
2020	7,801	29.45%	18,029	68.07%	656	2.48%
2024	9,364	36.20%	15,711	60.74%	792	3.06%

== See also ==
- National Register of Historic Places listings in McKinley County, New Mexico
