= Church Rock, New Mexico =

Human settlement in New Mexico, United States

Church Rock, New Mexico Kinłitsosinil (Navajo) Churchrock Chapter
- Census-designated place
- Location in McKinley County and the state of New Mexico

- Location in the United States
- Coordinates: 35°34′09″N 108°36′42″W
- Country: United States
- State: New Mexico
- County: McKinley
- Established: December 5, 1955

Government
  - Type: Chapter government
  - President: Johnnie Henry Jr
  - Vice-President: Caroline Whiteman
  - Secretary-Treasurer: Louise Jim

Area
  - Total: 18.34 sq mi (47.50 km^{2})
  - Land: 18.34 sq mi (47.50 km^{2})
  - Water: 0 sq mi (0.00 km^{2})
- Elevation: 7,025 ft (2,141 m)

Population (2020)
  - Total: 1,542
  - Density: 84.1/sq mi (32.46/km^{2})
- Time zone: UTC-7 (Mountain (MST))
  - Summer (DST): UTC-6 (MDT)
- ZIP code: 87311
- Area code: 505
- FIPS code: 35-15370
- GNIS feature ID: 2407618
- Website: churchrock.navajochapters.org

Church Rock (Navajo: Kinłitsosinil) is a census-designated place (CDP) in McKinley County, New Mexico, United States. The population was 1,542 at the 2020 census, up from 1,128 in 2010. The community is named for Church Rock, a prominent natural landmark.

== Geography ==
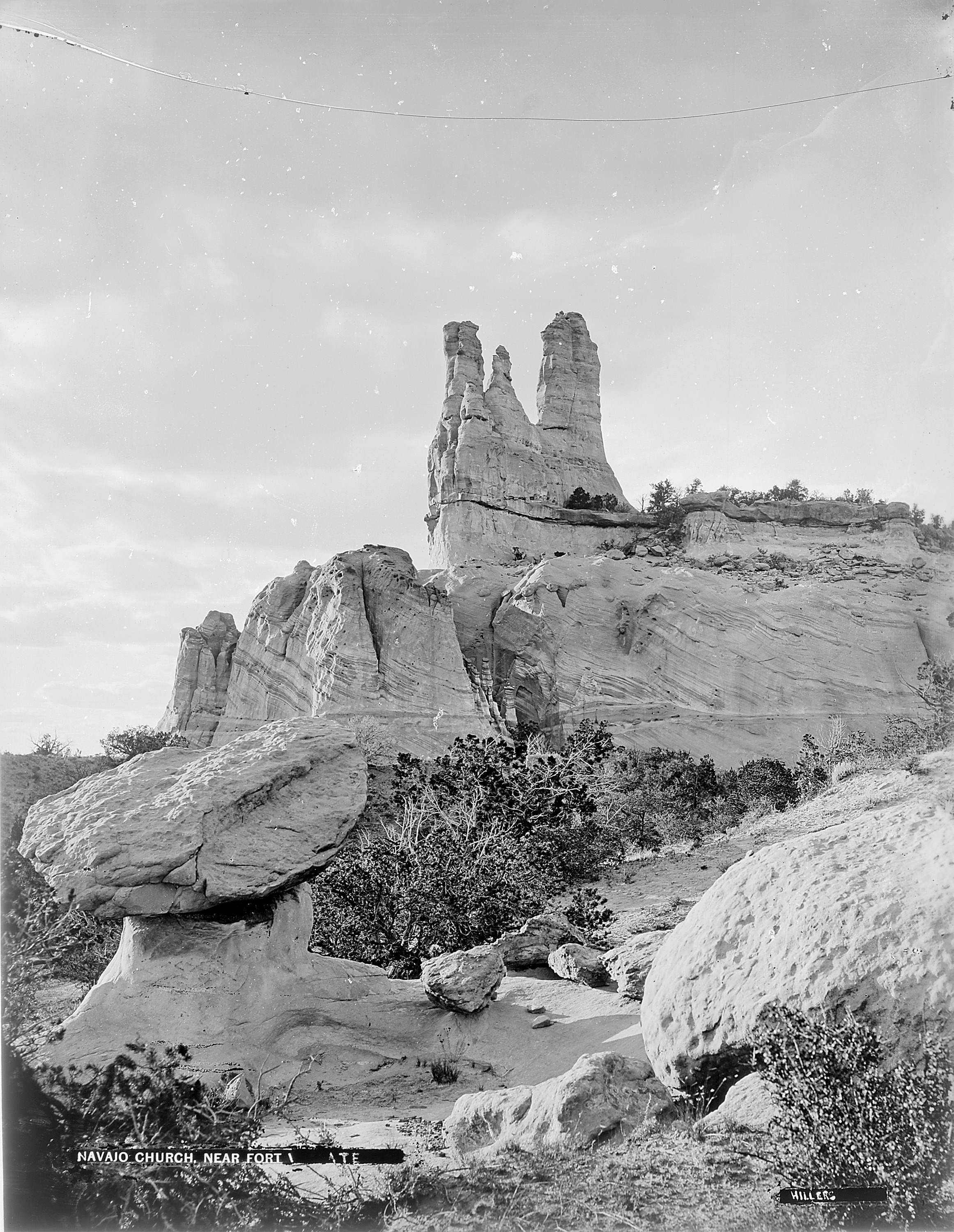
Church Rock, a famous landmark. Photo circa 1875.

The community is located in western McKinley County at 35°32′6″N 108°36′42″W (35.534961, -108.611593). It is bordered to the west by Gallup, the county seat, to the southwest by Sundance, and to the east by Iyanbito.

New Mexico State Road 566 has its southern terminus in Church Rock and runs north through the center of the community and leads northeast 11 miles (18 km) to its terminus. U.S. Route 66 runs along the southern edge of the community, leading west 7 miles (11 km) into Gallup and east the same distance to Exit 36 on Interstate 40.

According to the U.S. Census Bureau, the Church Rock CDP has a total area of 18.3 square miles (47 km^{2}), all of it recorded as land. The South Fork of the Puerco River runs through the community, leading west to the Little Colorado River in Arizona.

== Uranium mining ==
On July 16, 1979, the dam at a United Nuclear Corporation (based in Virginia) Church Rock uranium mill was breached and spilled 1,100 tons of milled uranium ore and 94 million US gallons (360,000 m^{3}) of heavy metal effluent into the Puerco River. This was the largest release of radioactive waste in U.S. history, but until recently, no epidemiological studies were undertaken on the effects on the population. With the declining uranium market, two of the mines closed in 1983 and the third closed in February 1986.

In 2003 the Church Rock Uranium Monitoring Project was initiated by the Churchrock Chapter of the Navajo Nation to assess environmental impacts of abandoned uranium mines and build capacity to conduct community-based research with policy implications. Its May 2007 report found that significant radiation from both natural and mining sources remains in the area. The community is dedicated to remedy the problem as much as possible.

In 2005 the Navajo Nation prohibited any further uranium mining in the nation. In 2008 the US EPA and the Navajo EPA began a five-year plan to identify and ameliorate areas contaminated by uranium mining; their priority has been water sources and structures.

In 2013 the Churchrock Chapter passed a resolution supporting a demonstration in-situ mining at Section 8 and 17. The resolution passed with 68 in support 26 opposed and 16 abstained. A minority of community members continue to oppose mining operations, as do some outside residents who reside in other chapters and non-Navajos.

== Demographics ==
Historical population
| Census | Pop. | Note | %± |
|---|---|---|---|
| 2000 | 1,077 | | — |
| 2010 | 1,128 | | 4.7% |
| 2020 | 1,542 | | 36.7% |
U.S. Decennial Census

| Languages (2000) | Percent |
|---|---|
| Spoke Navajo at home | 63.31% |
| Spoke English at home | 36.69% |

As of the census of 2000, there were 1,077 people, 258 households, and 214 families residing in the CDP. The population density was 450.7 inhabitants per square mile (174.0/km^{2}). There were 299 housing units at an average density of 125.1 per square mile (48.3/km^{2}). The racial makeup of the CDP was 98.14% Native American, 0.65% White, 0.09% African American, 0.28% from other races, and 0.84% from two or more races. Hispanic or Latino of any race were 1.39% of the population.

There were 258 households, out of which 56.2% had children under the age of 18 living with them, 43.4% were married couples living together, 31.0% had a female householder with no husband present, and 16.7% were non-families. 15.1% of all households were made up of individuals, and 3.5% had someone living alone who was 65 years of age or older. The average household size was 4.17 and the average family size was 4.65.

In the CDP, the population was spread out, with 42.2% under the age of 18, 11.7% from 18 to 24, 26.0% from 25 to 44, 15.6% from 45 to 64, and 4.5% who were 65 years of age or older. The median age was 22 years. For every 100 females, there were 92.0 males. For every 100 females age 18 and over, there were 87.3 males.

The median income for a household in the CDP was $27,917, and the median income for a family was $28,958. Males had a median income of $23,529 versus $21,016 for females. The per capita income for the CDP was $6,780. About 34.3% of families and 36.0% of the population were below the poverty line, including 47.5% of those under age 18 and none of those age 65 or over.

== Education ==
It is in Gallup-McKinley County Public Schools.

== Culture ==
In August, the Gallup Inter-Tribal Ceremonial brings members of almost all Native tribes, as well as visitors, to Red Rock State Park.

Churchrock Chapter celebrates the annual, Treaty Day Festival on June 1. The first event took place on June 1, 2010. The event is to commemorate the signing of the Treaty of 1868 between the Navajo Tribe and United States Government to emancipate the Navajo people from Fort Sumner, New Mexico (Bosque Redondo).

== Economy ==
Church Rock is the location of Fire Rock Casino, which opened on November 19, 2008.

== Navajo Nation government ==
| Chapter Official | 2004–2008 | 2008–2012 | 2013–2017 | 2017–2021 | 2021–2025 | 2025–2029 |
|---|---|---|---|---|---|---|
| President | Johnny Livingston | Johnnie Henry Jr. | Johnnie Henry Jr. | Johnnie Henry Jr. | Larry King | Johnnie Henry Jr. |
| Vice President | Robinson Kelly | Robinson Kelly | Sherman Woody | Sherman Woody | Caroline Whiteman | Caroline Whiteman |
| Secretary/Treasurer | Deeanna Washee | Louise Jim | Louise Jim | Louise Jim | Francis Smith | Louise Jim |
| Land Board Member | Vanessa Morgan Begay-Lee | Emery Chee | Emery Chee | Donald Arviso | Emery Chee | Emery Chee 25–26, Norren Kelly 26–29 |
