= Vanderwagen, New Mexico =

Unincorporated community in New Mexico, United States

- Census-designated place
- Location within New Mexico Location within the United States
- Coordinates: 35°16′26″N 108°45′17″W
- Country: United States
- State: New Mexico
- County: McKinley

Area
  - Total: 2.00 sq mi (5.18 km^{2})
  - Land: 1.99 sq mi (5.16 km^{2})
  - Water: 0.0077 sq mi (0.02 km^{2})
- Elevation: 7,149 ft (2,179 m)

Population (2020)
  - Total: 48
  - Density: 24/sq mi (9.3/km^{2})
- Time zone: UTC-7 (Mountain (MST))
  - Summer (DST): UTC-6 (MDT)
- ZIP code: 87326
- Area code: 505
- GNIS feature ID: 902853
- FIPS code: 35-82430

Vanderwagen is an unincorporated community and census-designated place (CDP) in McKinley County, New Mexico, United States. As of the 2020 census, it had a population of 48.

== Geography ==
Vanderwagen is in southwestern McKinley County along New Mexico State Road 602, 17.5 miles (28.2 km) south of Gallup.

According to the U.S. Census Bureau, the CDP has an area of 2.0 square miles (5.2 km^{2}), of which 0.006 square miles (0.016 km^{2}), or 0.30%, are water. The community is drained by Nelson Wash, a west-flowing tributary of Whitewater Arroyo, which continues west to join the Puerco River near Allentown, Arizona.

== Demographics ==
Historical population
Census	Pop.	Note	%±
2020	48		—
U.S. Decennial Census

Vanderwagen was first listed as a census-designated place prior to the 2020 census.

== Education ==
Gallup-McKinley County Schools is the non-BIE school district. Zoned schools are: David Skeet Elementary School in Vanderwagen, Gallup Middle School, and Hiroshi Miyamura High School.

The Bureau of Indian Affairs operates a K-8 school, Chi Chil'tah Community School, which has a Vanderwagen address but is in Chi Chil Tah.
