= Brimhall Nizhoni, New Mexico =

Census-designated place in McKinley County, New Mexico, United States

Brimhall Nizhoni, New Mexico Maʼii Tééh Yitłizhí (Navajo)
- Census-designated place
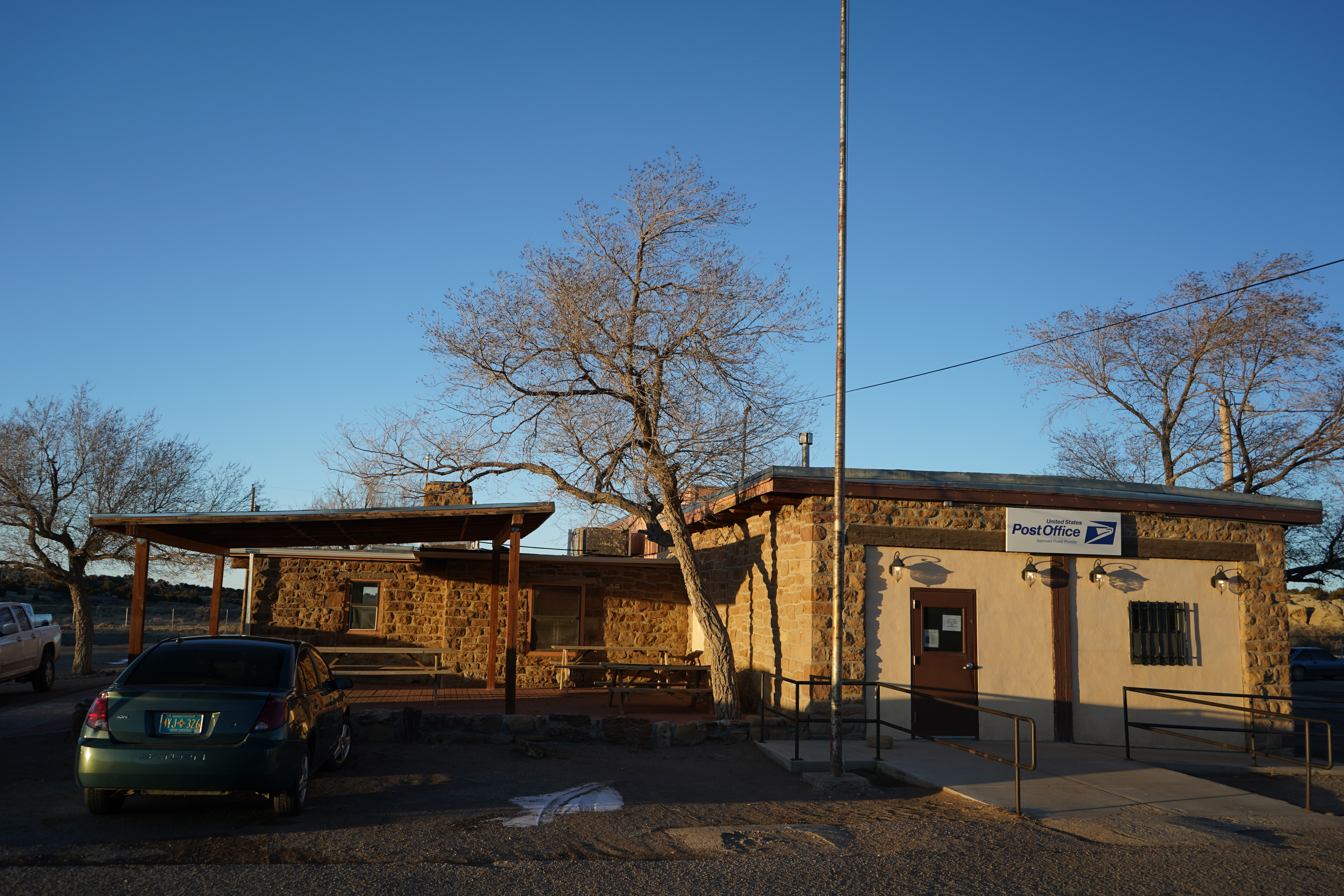
- Brimhall Post Office, February 2019
- Nickname: Coyote Canyon
- Location in McKinley County and the state of New Mexico

- Location in the United States
- Coordinates: 35°46′43″N 108°37′56″W
- Country: United States
- State: New Mexico
- County: McKinley

Area
  - Total: 16.31 sq mi (42.24 km^{2})
  - Land: 16.31 sq mi (42.24 km^{2})
  - Water: 0 sq mi (0.00 km^{2})
- Elevation: 6,139 ft (1,871 m)

Population (2020)
  - Total: 286
  - Density: 17.5/sq mi (6.77/km^{2})
- Time zone: UTC-7 (Mountain (MST))
  - Summer (DST): UTC-6 (MDT)
- ZIP Code: 87310 (Brimhall)
- Area code: 505
- FIPS code: 35-09035
- GNIS feature ID: 2407905

Brimhall Nizhoni (Navajo: Maʼii Tééh Yitłizhí) is a census-designated place (CDP) in McKinley County, New Mexico, United States. The population was 286 at the 2020 census, up from 199 in 2010. The Navajo Coyote Canyon Chapter House is located in Brimhall.

== Geography ==
The community is in northwestern McKinley County, 24 miles (39 km) north-northeast of Gallup and 13 miles (21 km) southeast of Tohatchi. According to the U.S. Census Bureau, the CDP has a total area of 16.3 square miles (42 km^{2}), all of it recorded as land. Coyote Wash passes through the community, leading north to the Chaco River, part of the San Juan River watershed and ultimately the Colorado River watershed.

== Demographics ==
Historical population
Census	Pop.	Note	%±
2000	373		—
2010	199		−46.6%
2020	286		43.7%
U.S. Decennial Census

Languages (2000)	Percent
Spoke Navajo at home	75.00%
Spoke English at home	25.00%

As of the census of 2000, there were 373 people, 95 households, and 79 families residing in the CDP. The population density was 22.9 inhabitants per square mile (8.8/km^{2}). There were 132 housing units at an average density of 8.1 per square mile (3.1/km^{2}). The racial makeup of the CDP was 99.46% Native American, 0.54% from other races. Hispanic or Latino of any race were 0.54% of the population.

There were 95 households, out of which 48.4% had children under the age of 18 living with them, 47.4% were married couples living together, 29.5% had a female householder with no husband present, and 16.8% were non-families. 15.8% of all households were made up of individuals, and 4.2% had someone living alone who was 65 years of age or older. The average household size was 3.93 and the average family size was 4.37.

In the CDP, the population was spread out, with 39.1% under the age of 18, 10.5% from 18 to 24, 25.7% from 25 to 44, 19.6% from 45 to 64, and 5.1% who were 65 years of age or older. The median age was 26 years. For every 100 females, there were 90.3 males. For every 100 females age 18 and over, there were 80.2 males.

The median income for a household in the CDP was $37,625, and the median income for a family was $28,750. Males had a median income of $25,455 versus $15,938 for females. The per capita income for the CDP was $8,290. About 25.6% of families and 34.8% of the population were below the poverty line, including 40.7% of those under age 18 and 34.6% of those age 65 or over.

== Education ==
It is in Gallup-McKinley County Public Schools.

Zoned schools are: Twin Lakes Elementary School in Twin Lakes, Tohatchi Middle School in Tohatchi, and Tohatchi High School in Tohatchi.

== See also ==
- List of census-designated places in New Mexico
