= Nakaibito, New Mexico =

Nakaibito, New Mexico Naakaii Bitoʼ (Navajo) Mexican Springs
- Census-designated place
- Location in McKinley County and the state of New Mexico

- Location in the United States
- Coordinates: 35°46′57″N 108°48′28″W
- Country: United States
- State: New Mexico
- County: McKinley

Area
  - Total: 7.00 sq mi (18.12 km^{2})
  - Land: 7.00 sq mi (18.12 km^{2})
  - Water: 0 sq mi (0.00 km^{2})
- Elevation: 6,378 ft (1,944 m)

Population (2020)
  - Total: 355
  - Density: 50.7/sq mi (19.59/km^{2})
- Time zone: UTC-7 (Mountain (MST))
  - Summer (DST): UTC-6 (MDT)
- ZIP code: 87320 ("Mexican Springs")
- Area code: 505
- FIPS code: 35-50860
- GNIS feature ID: 2408899

Nakaibito (also known as Mexican Springs) is an unincorporated community and census-designated place (CDP) in McKinley County, New Mexico, United States. The population was 355 at the 2020 census. The Mexican Springs post office (ZIP Code 87320) serves the community.

== Geography ==
Nakaibito is in northwestern McKinley County, 3 miles (5 km) west of U.S. Route 491 and 22 miles (35 km) north of Gallup, the county seat.

According to the U.S. Census Bureau, the CDP has a total area of 7.0 square miles (18 km^{2}), all land. The area is drained by Figueredo Wash, which runs east toward Coyote Wash, part of the Chaco River watershed leading north to the San Juan River and eventually the Colorado River.

== Demographics ==
Historical population
Census	Pop.	Note	%±
2000	455		—
2010	466		2.4%
2020	355		−23.8%
U.S. Decennial Census

As of the census of 2000, there were 455 people, 117 households, and 91 families residing in the CDP. The population density was 66.2 inhabitants per square mile (25.6/km^{2}). There were 150 housing units at an average density of 21.8 per square mile (8.4/km^{2}). The racial makeup of the CDP was 99.12% Native American, 0.44% White, 0.22% Asian, and 0.22% from other races. Hispanic or Latino of any race were 1.54% of the population.

There were 117 households, out of which 41.0% had children under the age of 18 living with them, 44.4% were married couples living together, 28.2% had a female householder with no husband present, and 21.4% were non-families. 17.1% of all households were made up of individuals, and 7.7% had someone living alone who was 65 years of age or older. The average household size was 3.89 and the average family size was 4.52.

In the CDP, the population was spread out, with 37.8% under the age of 18, 12.5% from 18 to 24, 27.5% from 25 to 44, 14.7% from 45 to 64, and 7.5% who were 65 years of age or older. The median age was 25 years. For every 100 females, there were 97.8 males. For every 100 females age 18 and over, there were 93.8 males.

The median income for a household in the CDP was $28,068, and the median income for a family was $28,977. Males had a median income of $21,786 versus $28,188 for females. The per capita income for the CDP was $8,546. About 24.7% of families and 25.8% of the population were below the poverty line, including 18.0% of those under age 18 and 45.7% of those age 65 or over.

== Education ==
It is in the Gallup-McKinley County Schools district.

Zoned schools are, all in Tohatchi: Tohatchi Elementary School, Tohatchi Middle School, and Tohatchi High School.

== Archaeology ==
Many archaeological investigations have been done in the general area of Nakaibito and the nearby community of Tohatchi.
