= Twin Lakes, New Mexico =

- Census-designated place
- Location in McKinley County and the state of New Mexico
- Coordinates: 35°41′04″N 108°45′25″W
- Country: United States
- State: New Mexico
- County: McKinley

Area
  - Total: 9.02 sq mi (23.36 km^{2})
  - Land: 9.02 sq mi (23.36 km^{2})
  - Water: 0 sq mi (0.00 km^{2})
- Elevation: 6,349 ft (1,935 m)

Population (2020)
  - Total: 1,004
  - Density: 111.3/sq mi (42.99/km^{2})
- Time zone: UTC-7 (Mountain (MST))
  - Summer (DST): UTC-6 (MDT)
- ZIP code: 87301
- Area code: 505
- FIPS code: 35-80540
- GNIS feature ID: 2409374

Twin Lakes is an unincorporated community and census-designated place (CDP) in McKinley County, New Mexico, United States. The population was 1,004 at the 2020 census.

== Geography ==
The community is in western McKinley County along U.S. Route 491, which leads south 14 miles (23 km) to Gallup, the county seat, and north 10 miles (16 km) to Tohatchi.

According to the U.S. Census Bureau, the CDP has a total area of 9.0 square miles (23 km^{2}), all land. The area drains northeast toward Coyote Wash, a tributary of the Chaco River and part of the San Juan River watershed.

== Demographics ==
Historical population
| Census | Pop. | Note | %± |
|---|---|---|---|
| 2000 | 1,069 | | — |
| 2010 | 1,052 | | −1.6% |
| 2020 | 1,004 | | −4.6% |
U.S. Decennial Census

As of the census of 2000, there were 1,069 people, 277 households, and 221 families living in the CDP. The population density was 118.7 inhabitants per square mile (45.8/km^{2}). There were 368 housing units at an average density of 40.9 per square mile (15.8/km^{2}). The racial makeup of the CDP was 99.16% Native American, 0.65% from two or more races, and 0.19% White. Hispanic or Latino of any race were 0.75% of the population.

There were 277 households, out of which 49.8% had children under the age of 18 living with them, 40.8% were married couples living together, 27.4% had a female householder with no husband present, and 20.2% were non-families. 18.4% of all households were made up of individuals, and 5.8% had someone living alone who was 65 years of age or older. The average household size was 3.86 and the average family size was 4.42.

In the CDP the population was spread out, with 40.1% under the age of 18, 10.9% from 18 to 24, 28.3% from 25 to 44, 14.9% from 45 to 64, and 5.8% who were 65 years of age or older. The median age was 24 years. For every 100 females there were 94.0 males. For every 100 females age 18 and over, there were 90.5 males.

The median income for a household in the CDP was $19,618, and the median income for a family was $30,417. Males had a median income of $26,932 versus $22,083 for females. The per capita income for the CDP was $8,233. About 27.5% of families and 29.4% of the population were below the poverty line, including 26.1% of those under age 18 and 27.5% of those age 65 or over.

== Education ==
It is in Gallup-McKinley County Public Schools.

Zoned schools are: Twin Lakes Elementary School in Twin Lakes, Tohatchi Middle School in Tohatchi, and Tohatchi High School in Tohatchi.

== Notable people ==
- Aneva J. Yazzie, industrial engineer
