= Borrego Pass, New Mexico =

Unincorporated community in New Mexico, US

- Census-designated place
- Location within New Mexico Location within the United States
- Coordinates: 35°34′23″N 108°00′18″W
- Country: United States
- State: New Mexico
- County: McKinley

Area
  - Total: 13.23 sq mi (34.3 km^{2})
  - Land: 13.23 sq mi (34.3 km^{2})
  - Water: 0.00 sq mi (0 km^{2})
- Elevation: 7,438 ft (2,267 m)

Population (2020)
  - Total: 117
  - Density: 8.84/sq mi (3.41/km^{2})
- Time zone: UTC-7 (Mountain (MST))
  - Summer (DST): UTC-6 (MDT)
- ZIP codes: 87323 (Thoreau); 87045 (Prewitt)
- Area code: 505
- FIPS code: 35-08493
- GNIS feature ID: 886640

Borrego Pass (Navajo: Dibé Yázhí Habitiin) is an unincorporated community and census-designated place (CDP) consisting of two Navajo communities and a trading post in the Navajo lands of McKinley County, in northwestern New Mexico, United States. In Navajo its name is Dibé Yázhí Habitiin, meaning "Upward Path of the Lamb." As of the 2020 census, the population was 117.

== History ==
The community formed around the Borrego Pass Trading Post which was opened in 1927 and was first operated by Ben and Anna Harvey, and then starting in 1935 by Bill and Jean Cousins. It was sold in 1939 to Don and Fern Smouse who operated it for over forty years. The trading post was named after the nearby Borrego Pass an ancient water gap, across the Continental Divide, that cuts into the Dutton Plateau.

== Geography ==
Borrego Pass is located in east-central McKinley County on Navajo Route 48, 15 miles (24 km) by road southeast of Crownpoint and 16 miles (26 km) north of Prewitt. The town center, including Borrego Pass School, sits at an elevation of 7,369 feet (2,246 m) less than a mile southwest of the pass proper.

According to the U.S. Census Bureau, the Borrego Pass CDP has an area of 13.2 square miles (34.2 km^{2}), all land. The Continental Divide runs through the northern and eastern parts of the CDP, sometimes forming its northeastern border. Most of the community, on the south side of the divide, drains southward toward Casamero Draw and eventually the Rio San Jose, part of the Rio Puerco watershed leading to the Rio Grande and the Gulf of Mexico. The northernmost part of the CDP drains north toward Kim-me-ni-oli Wash, a tributary of the Chaco River, part of the San Juan River watershed leading to the Colorado River and ultimately the Gulf of California.

== Education ==
There is a Navajo school at Borrego Pass, the Borrego Pass School (Dibé Yázhí Habitiin Óltaʼ) which was established in the early 1950s. In 1972, it became one of the first contract schools of the Bureau of Indian Affairs (B.I.A.). It is now affiliated with the Bureau of Indian Education (BIE).

It is in Gallup-McKinley County Public Schools. It is zoned to Crownpoint Elementary School, Crownpoint Middle School, and Crownpoint High School.
