= Zuni Pueblo, New Mexico =

Zuni Pueblo, New Mexico Halona: Idiwan’a (Zuni)
- Census-designated place
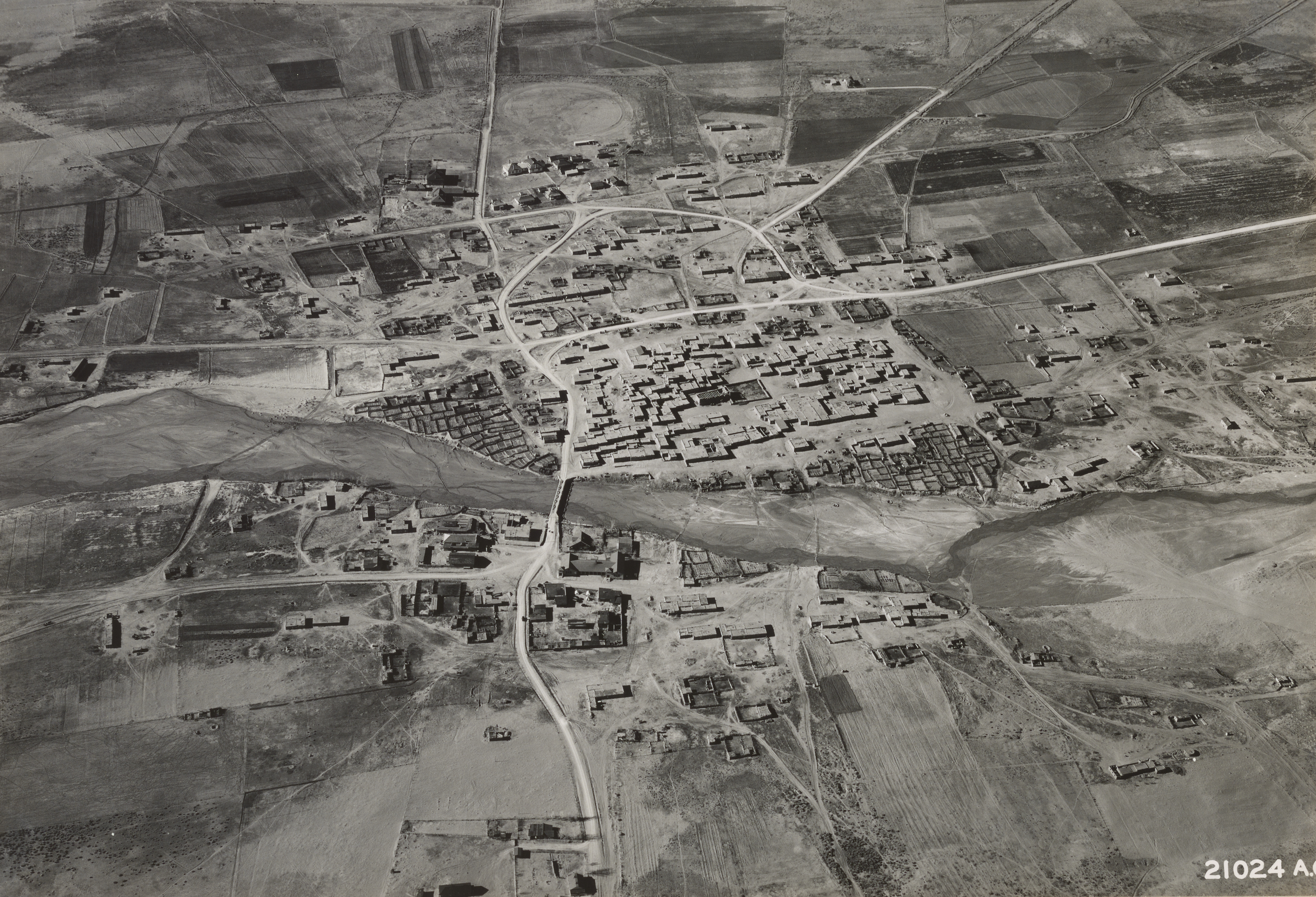
- Zuni Pueblo in 1945

- Location of Zuni Pueblo, New Mexico

- Location in the United States Zuni Pueblo (New Mexico)
- Coordinates: 35°04′02″N 108°52′22″W
- Country: United States
- State: New Mexico
- County: McKinley

Area
  - Total: 12.62 sq mi (32.69 km^{2})
  - Land: 12.62 sq mi (32.69 km^{2})
  - Water: 0 sq mi (0.00 km^{2})
- Elevation: 6,273 ft (1,912 m)

Population (2020)
  - Total: 6,176
  - Density: 489.3/sq mi (188.91/km^{2})
- Time zone: UTC-7 (Mountain (MST))
  - Summer (DST): UTC-6 (MDT)
- ZIP Code: 87327 (Zuni)
- Area code: 505
- FIPS code: 35-86595
- GNIS feature ID: 2409649
- Website: ashiwi.org

Zuni Pueblo (Zuni: Halona: Idiwan’a; lit. 'Middle Place') is a census-designated place (CDP) in McKinley County, New Mexico, United States. The population was 6,176 as of the 2020 Census. It is inhabited largely by members of the Zuni people.

== Geography ==
The community is within the Zuni Indian Reservation or Pueblo of Zuni in southwestern McKinley County, 37 miles (60 km) south of Gallup, the county seat, and 11 miles (18 km) east of the Arizona border. It is bordered to the east by the smaller community of Black Rock. New Mexico State Road 53 passes through Zuni Pueblo and Black Rock, leading east 21 miles (34 km) to Ramah and southwest (along with Arizona State Route 61) 25 miles (40 km) to U.S. Route 191.

According to the U.S. Census Bureau, the Zuni Pueblo CDP has a total area of 12.6 square miles (33 km^{2}), all land. The Zuni River passes through the community, running southwest to join the Little Colorado River near Hunt, Arizona.

A significant landmark of Zuni Pueblo is the Dowa Yalanne, a mesa covering approximately 320 acres (130 ha) rising just outside of the community to the southeast.

=== Climate ===
Climate data for Zuni Pueblo, New Mexico (1991–2020)
Month	Jan	Feb	Mar	Apr	May	Jun	Jul	Aug	Sep	Oct	Nov	Dec	Year
Mean daily maximum °F (°C)	48.3 (9.1)	53.0 (11.7)	60.9 (16.1)	68.0 (20.0)	77.0 (25.0)	88.0 (31.1)	90.3 (32.4)	87.7 (30.9)	82.3 (27.9)	71.0 (21.7)	58.7 (14.8)	48.6 (9.2)	69.5 (20.8)
Daily mean °F (°C)	32.7 (0.4)	36.4 (2.4)	42.5 (5.8)	48.3 (9.1)	56.7 (13.7)	66.4 (19.1)	72.1 (22.3)	70.4 (21.3)	63.8 (17.7)	52.2 (11.2)	41.0 (5.0)	32.5 (0.3)	51.3 (10.7)
Mean daily minimum °F (°C)	17.0 (−8.3)	19.9 (−6.7)	24.2 (−4.3)	28.6 (−1.9)	36.5 (2.5)	44.7 (7.1)	54.0 (12.2)	53.1 (11.7)	45.3 (7.4)	33.3 (0.7)	23.3 (−4.8)	16.4 (−8.7)	33.0 (0.6)
Average precipitation inches (mm)	0.91 (23)	0.81 (21)	0.77 (20)	0.52 (13)	0.68 (17)	0.37 (9.4)	1.72 (44)	2.03 (52)	0.79 (20)	0.99 (25)	0.66 (17)	0.92 (23)	11.17 (284.4)
Average snowfall inches (cm)	2.8 (7.1)	1.7 (4.3)	0.9 (2.3)	0.3 (0.76)	0.1 (0.25)	0.0 (0.0)	0.0 (0.0)	0.0 (0.0)	0.0 (0.0)	0.1 (0.25)	0.7 (1.8)	3.4 (8.6)	10 (25.36)
Source: NOAA

== Demographics ==
Historical population
Census	Pop.	Note	%±
1950	2,563		—
1960	3,585		39.9%
1970	3,958		10.4%
1980	5,551		40.2%
1990	5,857		5.5%
2000	6,367		8.7%
2010	6,302		−1.0%
2020	6,176		−2.0%
U.S. Decennial Census

=== 2020 census ===
As of the 2020 census, Zuni Pueblo had a population of 6,176. The median age was 35.6 years. 26.1% of residents were under the age of 18 and 11.5% of residents were 65 years of age or older. For every 100 females there were 94.0 males, and for every 100 females age 18 and over there were 90.8 males age 18 and over.

0.0% of residents lived in urban areas, while 100.0% lived in rural areas.

There were 1,618 households in Zuni Pueblo, of which 49.1% had children under the age of 18 living in them. Of all households, 30.5% were married-couple households, 14.4% were households with a male householder and no spouse or partner present, and 42.1% were households with a female householder and no spouse or partner present. About 14.5% of all households were made up of individuals and 5.5% had someone living alone who was 65 years of age or older.

There were 1,693 housing units, of which 4.4% were vacant. The homeowner vacancy rate was 0.0% and the rental vacancy rate was 5.3%.

Racial composition as of the 2020 census
Race	Number	Percent
White	54	0.9%
Black or African American	4	0.1%
American Indian and Alaska Native	6,022	97.5%
Asian	11	0.2%
Native Hawaiian and Other Pacific Islander	1	0.0%
Some other race	11	0.2%
Two or more races	73	1.2%
Hispanic or Latino (of any race)	116	1.9%

=== 2000 census ===
As of the census of 2000, there were 6,367 people, 1,488 households, and 1,334 families residing in the CDP. The population density was 720.0 inhabitants per square mile (278.0/km^{2}). There were 1,622 housing units at an average density of 183.4 per square mile (70.8/km^{2}). The racial makeup of the CDP was 97.03% Native American, 2.12% White, 2.01% Hispanic or Latino, 0.03% African American, 0.03% Asian, 0.30% from other races, and 0.49% from two or more races.

There were 1,488 households, out of which 42.1% had children under the age of 18 living with them, 51.1% were married couples living together, 31.7% had a female householder with no husband present, and 10.3% were non-families. 9.0% of all households were made up of individuals, and 1.5% had someone living alone who was 65 years of age or older. The average household size was 4.26 and the average family size was 4.54.

In the CDP, the population was spread out, with 34.7% under the age of 18, 9.8% from 18 to 24, 32.3% from 25 to 44, 16.8% from 45 to 64, and 6.3% who were 65 years of age or older. The median age was 29 years. For every 100 females, there were 92.7 males. For every 100 females age 18 and over, there were 89.2 males.

The median income for a household in the CDP was $22,559, and the median income for a family was $22,067. Males had a median income of $18,345 versus $18,635 for females. The per capita income for the CDP was $6,908. About 40.0% of families and 43.0% of the population were below the poverty line, including 49.7% of those under age 18 and 41.7% of those age 65 or over.

== Arts and culture ==
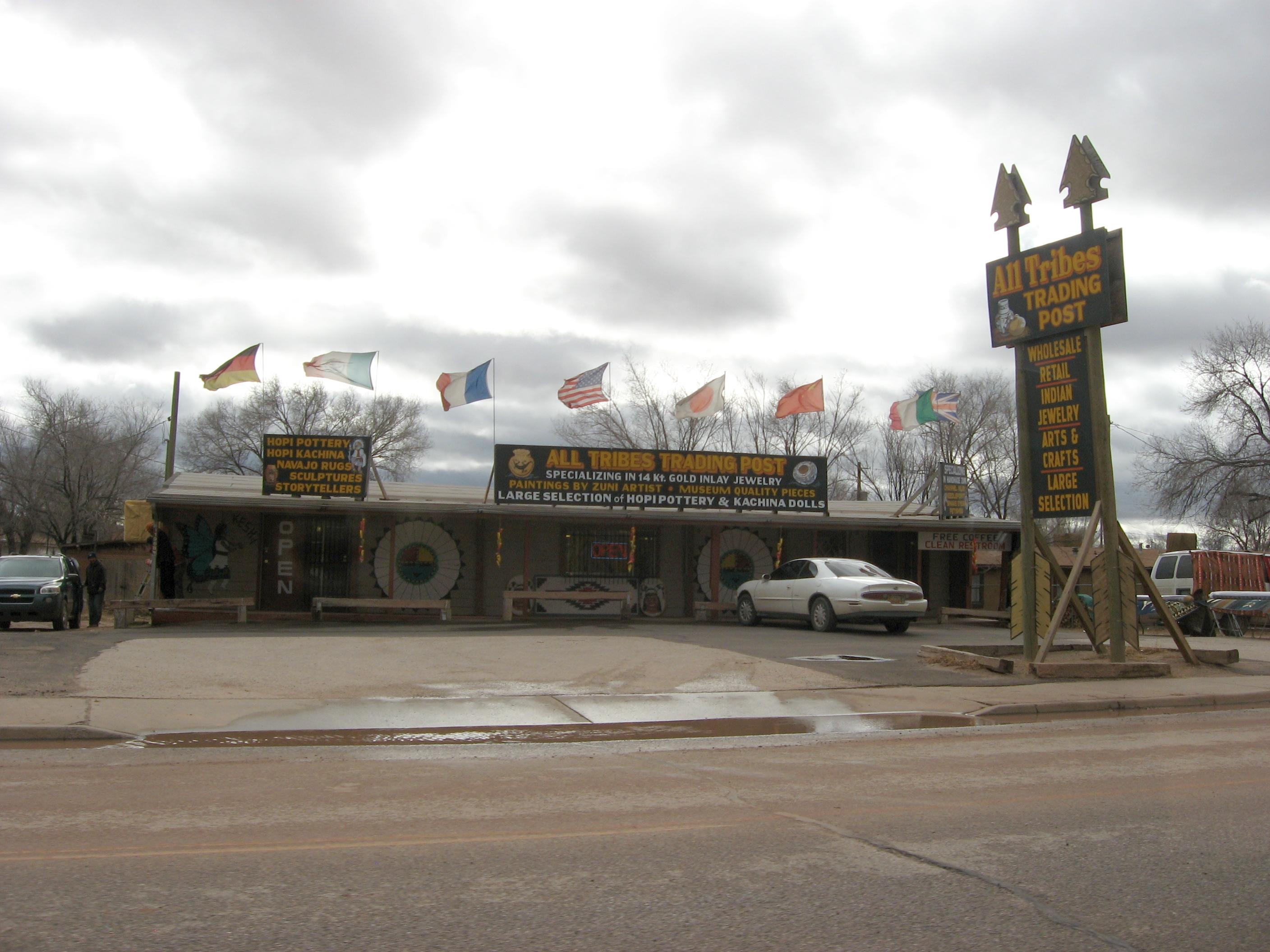
Business in Zuni Pueblo

=== Library ===
The Zuni Public Library opened in 1975.

=== Community ===
According to Zuni Pueblo's website, "many of Zuni Pueblo's events are open to the public", and "religious dances and activities" occur in the Middle Village area.

Zuni Pueblo is described as an "artist colony", with the main industry being stone fetish carving, inlay silverwork, pottery, and other artwork.

It is on the Trails of the Ancients Byway, one of the designated New Mexico Scenic Byways.

== Education ==
Zuni Public Schools, established in 1980, operates schools serving the community. Prior to 1980 it was in the Gallup-McKinley County Schools. Zuni High School is the zoned high school.

St. Anthony School, Zuni (K-8), of the Roman Catholic Diocese of Gallup, is in Zuni Pueblo. The school began operations on September 3, 1923. The Sisters of Saint Francis of Perpetual Adoration operated the school. Its initial enrollment was 43.

== Infrastructure ==
Tribally-run A:shiwi Transit connects Zuni Pueblo and Black Rock with Gallup.

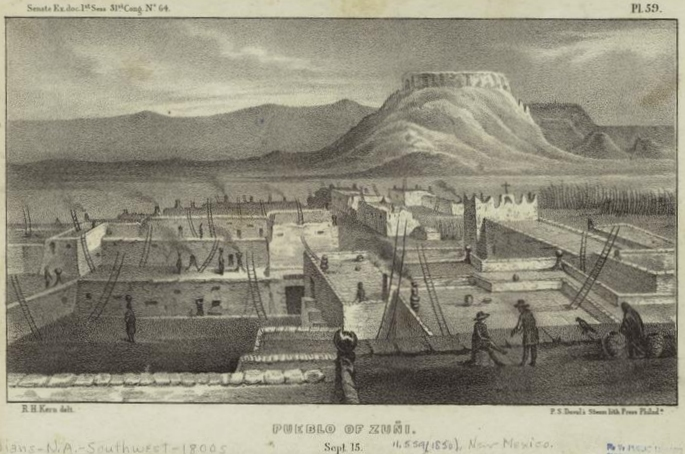
Zuni 1850 illustration

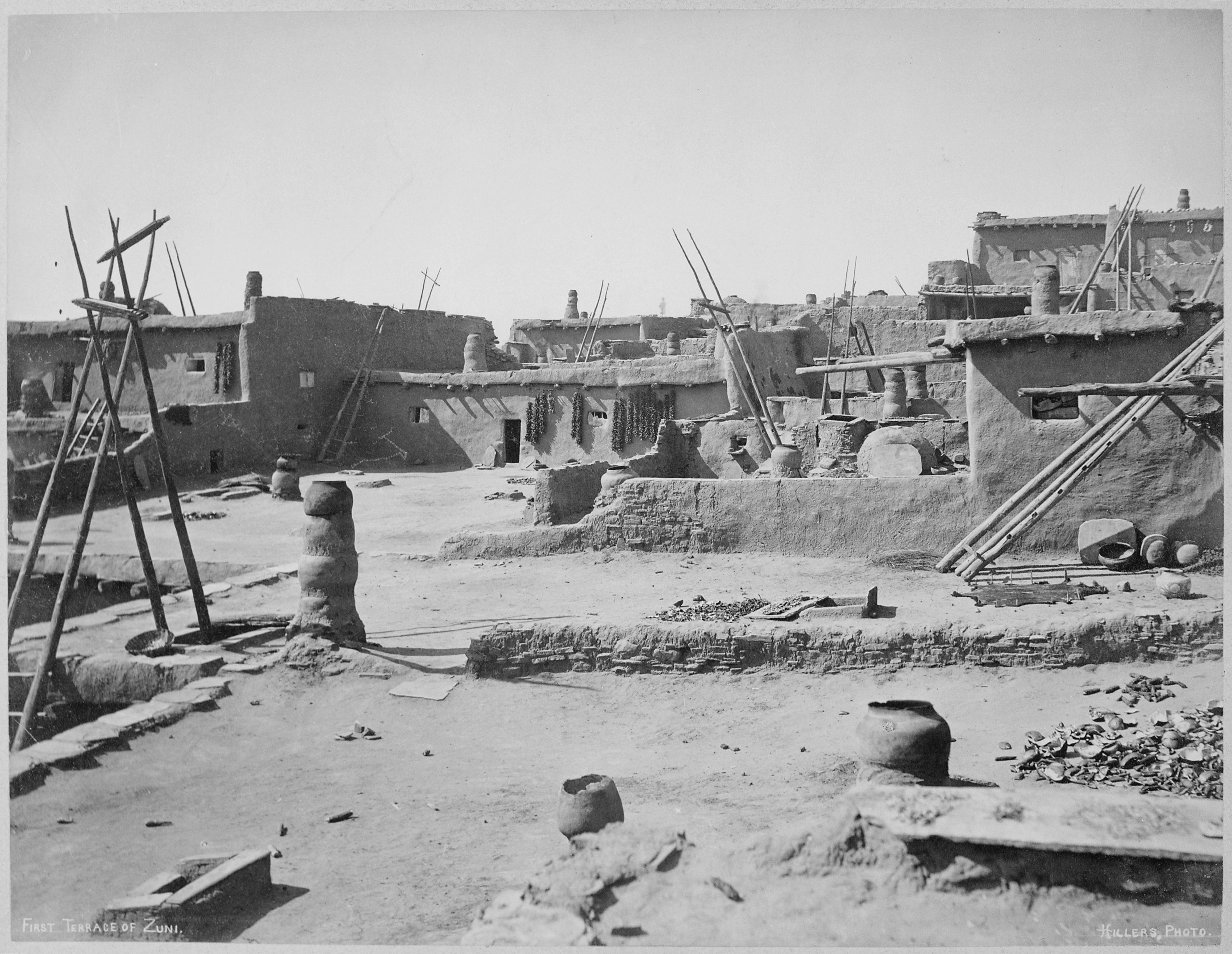
First terrace of Zuni in 1879

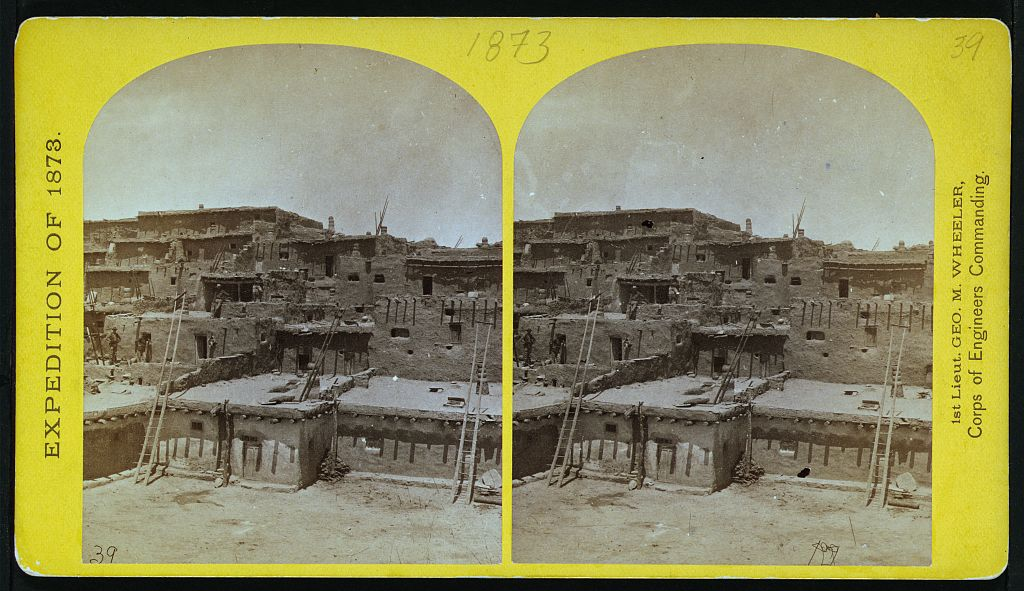
Zuni Pueblo, 1873, by Timothy H. O'Sullivan

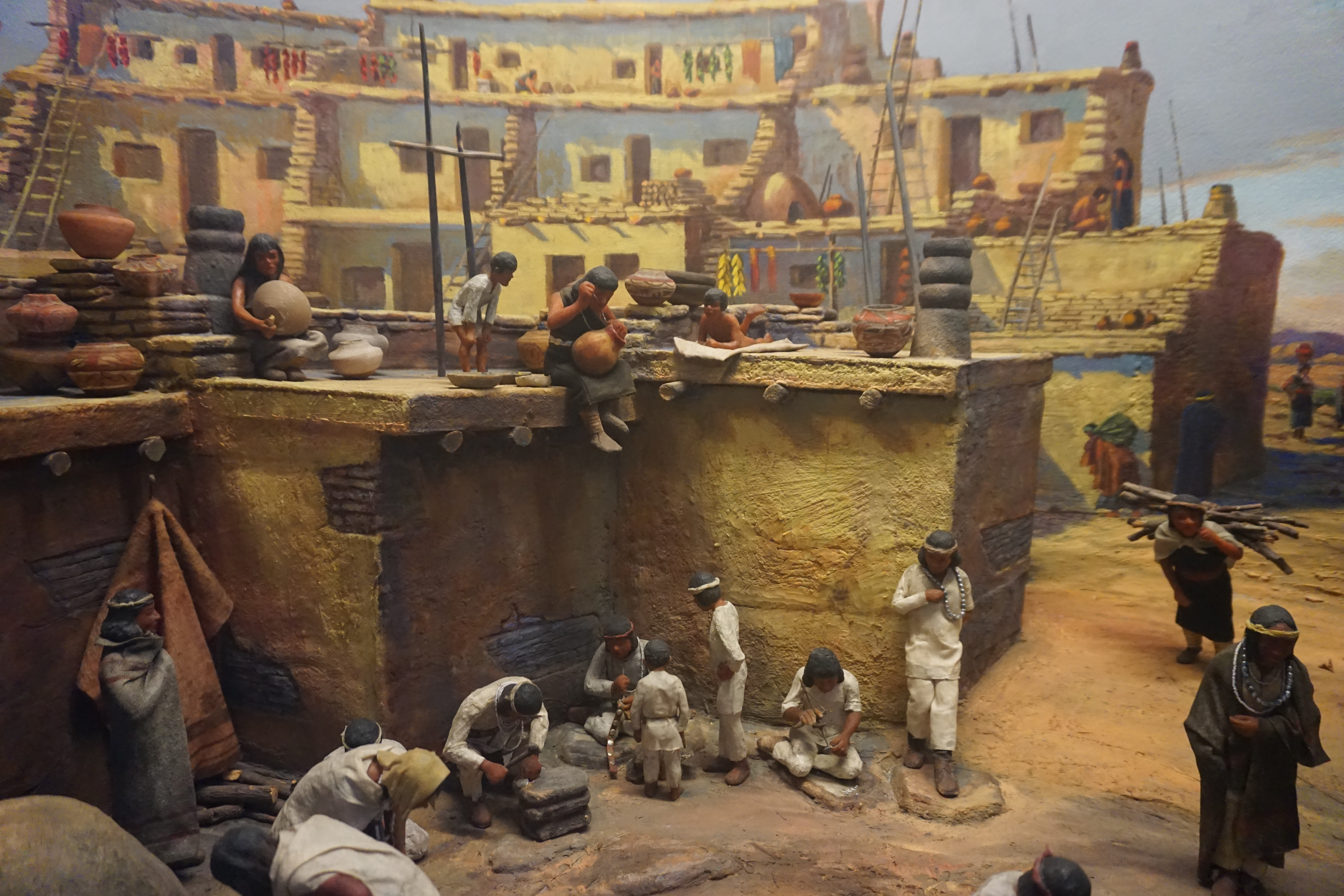
Village Life, Zuni Pueblo, New Mexico

== History ==
The first contact with Spaniards occurred in 1539 in the ancient village of Hawikku when Esteban, an Arab/Berber of Moroccan origin, entered Zuni territory seeking the fabled "Seven Cities of Cibola" and when Marco da Nizza, an Italian franciscan, reached Zuni Pueblo and called it Cibola.

=== Halona Pueblo ===
- Halona Pueblo
- U.S. National Register of Historic Places
- Location within New Mexico
- Nearest city: Gallup, New Mexico
- Coordinates: 35°04′04″N 108°49′37″W
- Area: 1,500 acres (6.1 km^{2})
- Built: 1539
- NRHP reference No.: 75002066
- Added to NRHP: February 10, 1975

The Halona Pueblo, also known as Zuni Pueblo, is located 36 miles south of Gallup, New Mexico on NM 32 & NM 53. The pueblo dates from before 1539, which was when Europeans first visited New Mexico. It was one of the original six pueblos of the Zuni people. The Fray Marcos de Niza expedition, led by Estevan the Moor, arrived to the area in 1539; most of its party were killed by the Zunis. Coronado's expedition a year later was disappointed not to find great wealth. It was listed on the National Register of Historic Places in 1975.

The Old Zuni Mission, or Nuestra Senora de la Candelaria (Our Lady of the Light), on Old Mission Dr. at 35.067782°N 108.849641°W is the building depicted in one photo with NRHP nomination.

Hawikuh Ruins is a National Historic Landmark 12 miles away.

Zuni-Cibola Complex, a National Historic Landmark District, was proposed as a National Park.

== See also ==
- List of census-designated places in New Mexico
- Zuni Indian Reservation
- Zuni people
