= Wesley Thomas (anthropologist) =

Navajo anthropologist

- Occupation: Anthropologist

Academic background
- Education: University of Washington (B.A., M.A., Ph.D)
- Thesis: Gendering Navajo bodies: A personal, political, and philosophical treatise (1999)

Academic work
- Discipline: Anthropology
- Institutions: Navajo Technical University

Wesley Thomas is a Diné (Navajo) cultural anthropologist and educator whose work focuses on Indigenous knowledge systems, Navajo spirituality, gender diversity, and the relationship between land and identity.

== Career ==
By 2003, Thomas was working as an Assistant Professor of Anthropology at Indiana University, where he specialized in American Indian gender studies. He served as Academic Dean (2006-2009) and Department Chair of the Center for Diné Studies (2011-2016) at Diné College. Thomas also served as co-director of GALACTIC (Global Arts Language Arts Culture Tradition Indigenous Communities).

He is a professor emeritus at Navajo Technical University, where he also served as Dean of Graduate Studies. At Navajo Technical University, Thomas helped to establish a Bachelor of Arts and Master of Arts in Diné culture, language, and leadership. His work has focused on decolonization of curricula within Indigenous higher educational institutions.

He was featured in the short documentary The Importance of Graduating in the Navajo Way and the 2013 documentary Two Spirits.

== Education ==
Thomas received a Bachelor of Arts in Anthropology, a Master of Arts in Cultural Anthropology, and a Ph.D. in Cultural Anthropology, from the University of Washington. While completing his PhD, Thomas served as a co-curator for the exhibit Woven by the Grandmothers: Nineteenth-Century Navajo Textiles at the National Museum of the American Indian.

== Personal life ==
Thomas is a member of the Navajo Nation. He is gay. Thomas is based in Tsaile, Arizona.

== Publications ==
=== Books ===
- Jacobs, Sue-Ellen; Thomas, Wesley; Lang, Sabine, eds. (1997). Two-spirit People: Native American Gender Identity, Sexuality, and Spirituality. University of Illinois Press. ISBN 978-0-252-06645-0.
  - Author of the chapter "Navajo Constructions of Gender and Sexuality"
