= Rio Nutria (Zuni River tributary) =

Rio Nutria Nutria Creek Arroyo de las Nutrias, Rio de las Nutrias
- Native name: Tsediijih, Taiakwin (Zuni)

Location
- Country: United States
- State: New Mexico
- Region: McKinley County
- City: Nutria

Physical characteristics
- Source
  - location: McKenzie Ridge in the Cibola National Forest
  - coordinates: 36°36′10″N 106°20′20″W
  - elevation: 8,386 ft (2,556 m)
- Mouth: Confluence with the Rio Pescado
  - location: Zuni Indian Reservation
  - coordinates: 35°06′39″N 108°42′56″W
  - elevation: 6,526 ft (1,989 m)

Basin features
- Tributaries
  - left: Sixmile Draw, Blind Canyon Draw, Crow Canyon, Burned Timber Canyon
  - right: Tampico Draw, Grasshopper Canyon, Coal Canyon, Unit Draw

Rio Nutria is a 32-mile-long (51 km) southwestward-flowing stream originating on McKenzie Ridge just west of the Continental Divide in the Cibola National Forest, in McKinley County, New Mexico, United States. Rio Nutria joins Rio Pescado to form the Zuni River in McKinley County on the Zuni Indian Reservation, in western New Mexico.

== History ==
Rio Nutria is archaic sixteenth and seventeenth century Spanish (primarily rural Castilian) for "beaver river". In New Mexico there are at least two other Rio Nutrias rivers. One is the Rio Nutrias which is a tributary to the Rio Chama, described by Francisco Silvestre Vélez de Escalante who wrote in his diary on August 2, 1776, "...we halted in a small plain on the bank of another arroyo which is called Rio de las Nutrias, because, although it is of permanent and running water, apparently during all or most of the year it stands in pools where they say beavers breed." In his annotated 1900 translation of the diary of Francisco Garcés, Elliott Coues wrote in a footnote: "In proof of this use of nutrias for beavers I can cite a passage in Escalante's Diario. Doc. para Hist. Mex.,2d ser., i, 1854, p. 426: "Aqui tienen las nutrias hechos con palizades tales tanques, que representan a primera vista un rio mas que mediano - here have the beavers made with sticks such ponds that they look at first sight like a river larger than usual"; the reference being of course to the damming of the stream by these animals." In his dictionary of New Mexico and Southern Colorado Spanish, Rubén Cobos also translates the word nutria (which is contemporary Spanish for otter), as meaning beaver in the archaic Spanish that persists in the region from the earliest settlers since 1598.

== Watershed and course ==
The Rio Nutria passes into the Zuni Indian Reservation and enters one of several reservoirs on the river, the Nutria Diversion Reservoir, then passes through the villages of Upper Nutria (native name is Doya) and Lower Nutria (native name is Taiakwin). Rio Nutria then passes into Nutria Reservoir N. 3, 4 and 2 before reaching its confluence with the Rio Pescado.

== Ecology ==
Not surprisingly, the river is excellent habitat for beavers (Castor canadensis). Fish species found in the Rio Nutrias at the U.S. 285 crossing include Rio Grande chub (Gila pandora), Fathead minnow (Pimephales promelas), Flathead chub (Platygobio gracilis), Longnose dace (Rhinichthys cataractae), and White Sucker (Catostomus commersoni). Riparian vegetation includes Coyote Willow (Salix exigua).

== See also ==
- List of tributaries of the Colorado River
- List of rivers of New Mexico
