= Aneva J. Yazzie =

- Born: Aneva Jean Yazzie
- Citizenship: United States; Navajo Nation
- Education: New Mexico State University

Aneva Jean Yazzie is an American and Navajo industrial engineer who served as the chief executive officer (CEO) of the Navajo Housing Authority (NHA) from 2007 to 2017. She took leadership of the agency as it faced federal investigations and internal turmoil. Her tenure was marked by widely reported struggles to spend federal funds and low rates of new home construction, which drew scrutiny from the U.S. Department of Housing and Urban Development (HUD). She resigned in 2017 following critical investigative reports from The Arizona Republic and U.S. senator John McCain.

A graduate of New Mexico State University, Yazzie's career in housing and facilities management spanned over 45 years. Before leading the NHA, she worked for the federal government, including HUD and the U.S. Department of the Interior, and as a private consultant. After her time as CEO, Yazzie served as the NHA's deputy chief executive officer until her retirement in 2024.

== Early life and education ==
Aneva Jean Yazzie is from Bááhazł'ah (Bahastł'ah). Her parents were Harry H. Yazzie and Marie Yazzie. She is Tsi'naajinii (Black Streak Wood People Clan) and born for Tódích'íi'nii (Bitter Water Clan). Her maternal grandfather is Tó'áhání (Near the Water Clan) and her paternal grandfather is Haltsooí Dine'é (Meadow People Clan).

While attending Tohatchi High School, Yazzie lived with her parents in Tohatchi, New Mexico and was named "Senior-of-the-Month." She served as secretary of her sophomore class and was involved in activities including National Honor Society, girls basketball, track, T Club, Photo Club, and cross country. In 1976, she was selected as one of 39 high-ability secondary students to participate in a National Science Foundation-sponsored chemistry program. After planning to major in engineering, she graduated from New Mexico State University in May 1982 with a B.S. in industrial engineering.

== Career ==
Yazzie is an industrial engineer. As of 2007, she had worked in the housing industry for over 30 years.

Yazzie stated she worked in the federal sector for the first 14 years of her career. A 2007 report noted a 20-year tenure with the federal government, working for both the U.S. Department of the Interior and the U.S. Department of Housing and Urban Development (HUD). In this capacity, she performed operational analyses to streamline systems for school construction and repair programs.

She later worked for 10 years as a private consultant, providing services related to creative financing and leveraging Indian Housing Block Grant funding to tribes across the U.S. She left consulting to become the deputy director of the State of Arizona Governor's Office Department of Housing. Yazzie stated she eventually moved back to the Navajo Nation to care for her parents.

=== Navajo Housing Authority ===
==== CEO tenure (2007–2017) ====
Yazzie was selected as chief executive officer (CEO) of the Navajo Housing Authority (NHA) and began her role on February 2, 2007. She called the position a "dream" and an opportunity to return to the reservation.

According to The Arizona Republic, Yazzie "inherited a mess" at the NHA. Her predecessor had resigned during a federal investigation, over a dozen major projects were described as "in chaos," and the HUD inspector general was cracking down on misappropriations, delays, and shoddy workmanship. Yazzie stated the NHA also lacked know-how, technology, and staffing. In response, she froze tribal projects and banned most previous subcontractors. Yazzie said this moratorium lasted at least three years. Agency records show no new homes were built from 2008 to 2011.

By 2012, the NHA had accumulated $477 million in unused federal funds. HUD's Denver office concluded the NHA had "wildly misrepresented" its construction numbers and sought the return of $96 million to the U.S. Treasury for not using the money as required. Yazzie contended that HUD was largely to blame for the unspent funds, citing a failure of federal oversight and training. HUD administrators disputed this, noting that a "special strike team" was created to help the NHA, but the NHA stopped attending the sessions in 2013.

Conflicting data on home construction was reported during her tenure. In March 2015, Yazzie wrote in an open letter to U.S. Congress that the NHA had built 580 units in the previous two years. However, the agency's official performance reports, which Yazzie authorized and submitted to HUD, showed 268 homes built during the three-year period from 2013 to 2015. Federal data showed that from 2008 to 2016, the NHA produced 543 homes, while the estimated need was 34,000 new dwellings.

==== Departure as CEO ====
In December 2016, The Arizona Republic published a six-part series alleging mismanagement and squandered funds at the NHA. In June 2017, a report from U.S. senator John McCain corroborated the newspaper's findings and recommended "overhauling NHA's leadership."

The Arizona Republic characterized Yazzie's departure as an "ouster" following conflicting statements from the NHA board and Navajo Nation president Russell Begaye. The NHA board initially issued a press release defending Yazzie and alleging she was a victim of "negative, one-sided information." One day later, president Begaye issued a sharply worded statement calling the NHA's performance "clearly unacceptable" and stating, "Houses are not being built."

Two hours after Begaye's comments, a collaborative news release announced Yazzie's resignation "by mutual agreement." Her final day as CEO was Friday, June 30, 2017. Board members stated Yazzie had originally planned to leave in October 2017. Upon her departure as CEO, Yazzie was to "continue in a transitional support role" reporting to the board. She commented to Farmington Daily Times, "We gave it our best. At the end of the day, that is all we can do."

==== Post-CEO and retirement ====
Yazzie served as the deputy chief executive officer of the NHA. In April 2024, she retired from this position and was recognized by the Navajo Nation's Resources and Development Committee (RDC) for 13 years of dedication. RDC Chairperson Brenda Jesus praised Yazzie's advocacy for the Native American Housing Assistance and Self-Determination Act of 1996 (NAHASDA) and HUD. Delegate Otto Tso commended her persistence with the federal government, and delegate Danny Simpson admired her accomplishments, including "the new 18 homes."

== Personal life ==
Upon her retirement in 2024, Yazzie announced plans to move to Phoenix, Arizona to be close to her first grandchild.

== See also ==
- Native American women in politics
