= Crownpoint, New Mexico =

Crownpoint, New Mexico Tʼiistsʼóóz Ńdeeshgizh (Navajo)
- Census-designated place
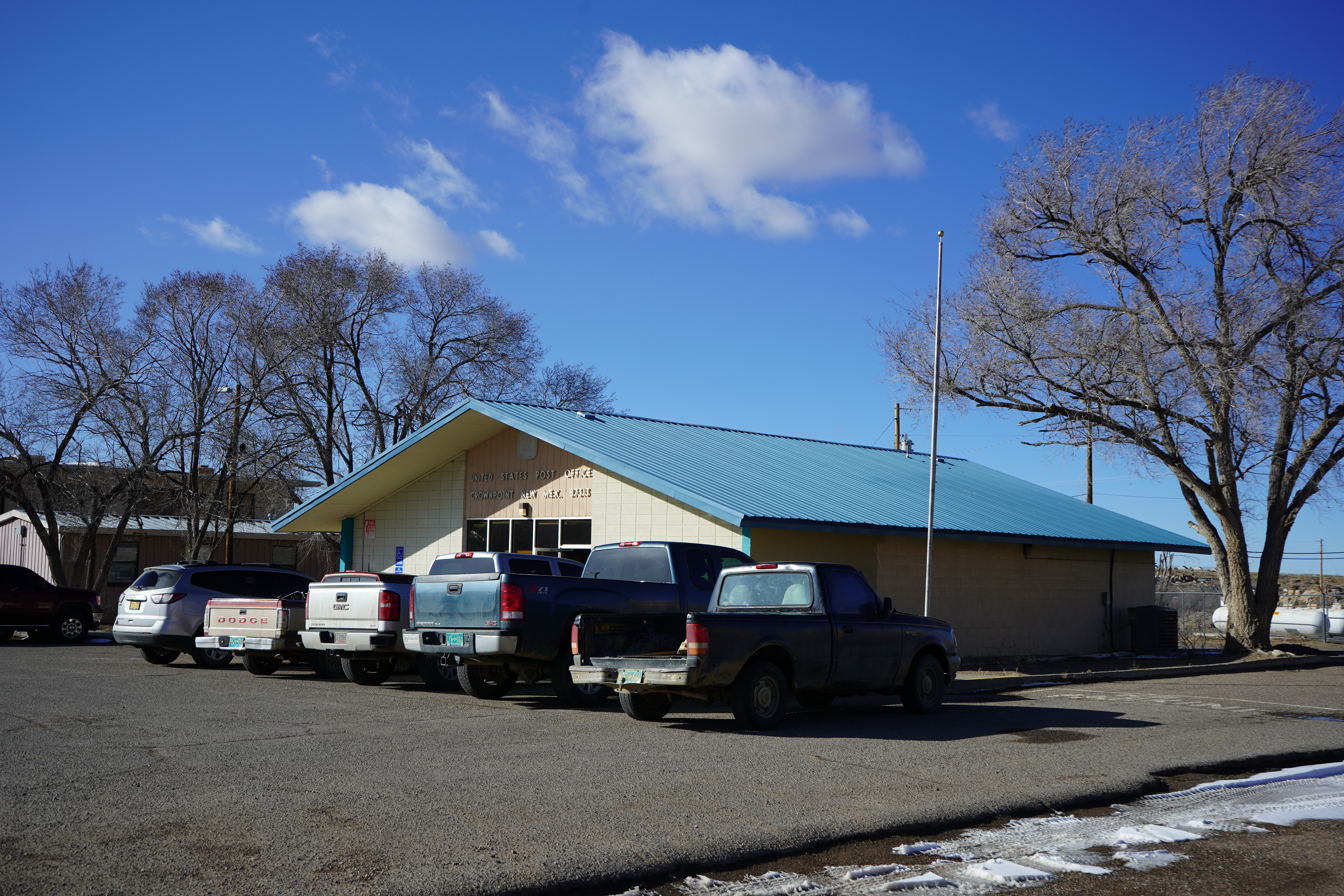
- Crownpoint Post Office

- Location in McKinley County and the state of New Mexico

- Location in the United States
- Coordinates: 35°43′02″N 108°08′35″W
- Country: United States
- State: New Mexico
- County: McKinley

Area
  - Total: 67.059 sq mi (173.68 km^{2})
  - Land: 67.059 sq mi (173.68 km^{2})
  - Water: 0.003 sq mi (0.0078 km^{2})
- Elevation: 6,851 ft (2,088 m)

Population (2020)
  - Total: 2,900
  - Density: 43.24/sq mi (16.70/km^{2})
- Time zone: UTC-7 (Mountain (MST))
  - Summer (DST): UTC-6 (MDT)
- ZIP code: 87313
- Area code: 505
- FIPS code: 35-18940
- GNIS feature ID: 2407689

Crownpoint (Navajo: Tʼiistsʼóóz Ńdeeshgizh) is an unincorporated community and census-designated place (CDP) on the Navajo Nation in McKinley County, New Mexico. The population was 2,900 at the time of the 2020 census, up from 2,278 in 2010. It is located along the Trail of the Ancients Byway, a designated New Mexico Scenic Byway.

== History ==
Crownpoint was founded in 1912 by Samuel F. Stacher as an Indian agency to serve the Navajo people in the Pueblo Bonito Agency of northwestern New Mexico. A school house, agency office and power house were built to accommodate future planned establishments.

Chief Becenti, a local Navajo headman, is one of the first documented leaders of the area. He resided north of Crownpoint, where later in the 1930s a small community would be named after him, called Becenti Lake.

In June 1965, Crownpoint was recognized as a local chapter government sub-unit of the Navajo Nation government. There are a total of 110 Navajo chapters across the Navajo Nation. The Crownpoint chapter serves as the center of Eastern Navajo Agency, and many tribal offices are located in the community.

== Geography ==
Crownpoint is in central McKinley County along New Mexico State Road 371, which leads south 23 miles (37 km) to Thoreau and Interstate 40, and north 83 miles (134 km) to Farmington. The community sits at an elevation of 6,851 feet (2,088 m) on land that drains toward the Chaco River 30 miles (48 km) to the north. According to the U.S. Census Bureau, the Crownpoint CDP has a total area of 67.1 square miles (174 km^{2}), of which 0.003 square miles (0.008 km^{2}), or 0.004%, are water.

== Demographics ==
Historical population
Census	Pop.	Note	%±
2000	2,630		—
2010	2,278		−13.4%
2020	2,900		27.3%
U.S. Decennial Census

=== 2020 census ===
As of the 2020 census, Crownpoint had a population of 2,900. The median age was 32.9 years. 27.2% of residents were under the age of 18 and 11.7% of residents were 65 years of age or older. For every 100 females there were 83.7 males, and for every 100 females age 18 and over there were 81.9 males age 18 and over.

0.0% of residents lived in urban areas, while 100.0% lived in rural areas.

There were 872 households in Crownpoint, of which 42.0% had children under the age of 18 living in them. Of all households, 30.6% were married-couple households, 20.6% were households with a male householder and no spouse or partner present, and 40.7% were households with a female householder and no spouse or partner present. About 24.5% of all households were made up of individuals and 8.3% had someone living alone who was 65 years of age or older.

There were 988 housing units, of which 11.7% were vacant. The homeowner vacancy rate was 0.0% and the rental vacancy rate was 7.5%.

Racial composition as of the 2020 census
Race	Number	Percent
White	114	3.9%
Black or African American	28	1.0%
American Indian and Alaska Native	2,615	90.2%
Asian	50	1.7%
Native Hawaiian and Other Pacific Islander	3	0.1%
Some other race	29	1.0%
Two or more races	61	2.1%
Hispanic or Latino (of any race)	82	2.8%

=== 2000 census ===
As of the census of 2000, there were 2,630 people, 749 households, and 599 families residing in the CDP. The population density was 372.3 inhabitants per square mile (143.7/km^{2}). There were 937 housing units at an average density of 132.6 per square mile (51.2/km^{2}). The racial makeup of the CDP was 89.09% Native American, 8.78% White, 0.42% African American, 0.38% Asian, 0.23% from other races, 0.04% Pacific Islander, and 1.06% from two or more races. Hispanic or Latino of any race were 1.18% of the population.

There were 749 households, out of which 49.4% had children under the age of 18 living with them, 45.7% were married couples living together, 27.4% had a female householder with no husband present, and 19.9% were non-families. 17.4% of all households were made up of individuals, and 1.9% had someone living alone who was 65 years of age or older. The average household size was 3.51 and the average family size was 4.03.

In the CDP, the population was spread out, with 39.7% under the age of 18, 9.4% from 18 to 24, 27.6% from 25 to 44, 19.4% from 45 to 64, and 3.9% who were 65 years of age or older. The median age was 26 years. For every 100 females, there were 90.0 males. For every 100 females age 18 and over, there were 80.7 males.

The median income for a household in the CDP was $29,792, and the median income for a family was $31,384. Males had a median income of $25,040 versus $24,704 for females. The per capita income for the CDP was $9,964. About 26.1% of families and 27.3% of the population were below the poverty line, including 33.8% of those under age 18 and 19.6% of those age 65 or over.

Languages (2000)	Percent
Spoke Navajo at home	64.33%
Spoke English at home	35.67%

== Education ==
It is in Gallup-McKinley County Public Schools. District schools include Crownpoint Elementary School, Crownpoint Middle School, and Crownpoint High School.

The Bureau of Indian Education (BIE) operates T'iis Ts'ozi Bi'Olta' (Crownpoint Community School) in Crownpoint.

There are other BIE schools that are located away from Crownpoint but which have Crownpoint post office addresses:

- Lake Valley Navajo School
- Mariano Lake Community School
- Tse'ii'ahi' Community School - 18 miles (29 km) west of Crownpoint

The main campus of Navajo Technical University is located in Crownpoint.

Diné College has a campus in Crownpoint.

== See also ==
- List of census-designated places in New Mexico
