= Black Rock, New Mexico =

Census-designated place in McKinley County, New Mexico, United States

- Census-designated place
- Location in McKinley County and the state of New Mexico

- Location in the United States
- Coordinates: 35°05′01″N 108°47′51″W
- Country: United States
- State: New Mexico
- County: McKinley

Area
  - Total: 1.80 sq mi (4.66 km^{2})
  - Land: 1.75 sq mi (4.52 km^{2})
  - Water: 0.054 sq mi (0.14 km^{2})
- Elevation: 6,345 ft (1,934 m)

Population (2020)
  - Total: 1,190
  - Density: 681.6/sq mi (263.15/km^{2})
- Time zone: UTC-7 (Mountain (MST))
  - Summer (DST): UTC-6 (MDT)
- ZIP Code: 87327 (Zuni)
- Area code: 505
- FIPS code: 35-07670
- GNIS feature ID: 2407858

Black Rock (Navajo: Tsézhįįh Deezlį́) is an unincorporated community and census-designated place (CDP) in McKinley County, New Mexico, United States. The population was 1,190 at the 2020 census, down from 1,323 in 2010.

== History ==
There was a spring at Black Rock and the Zuñi had irrigated fields there since about 3000 BP (950 BCE). The Zuñi had a small, seasonally occupied village on the lava flow, just north of the Zuni River, which the Spanish called "Ranchos de Zuñi".

== Geography ==
Black Rock is located on the Zuñi Reservation on the left bank (south side) of the Zuñi River, approximately 4 miles (6 km) east of the town of Zuñi, on the north side of NM Route 53. Immediately to the east of the community is the Black Rock Reservoir, which was created in 1908 by damming the Zuni River. The dam has undergone serious rebuilding three times since 1908, the most recent in the mid-1990s. Black Rock has a non-commercial airstrip built just after World War II, but not paved until 1970.

According to the United States Census Bureau, the Black Rock CDP has a total area of 1.80 square miles (4.7 km^{2}), of which 1.75 square miles (4.5 km^{2}) are land and 0.05 square miles (0.13 km^{2}), or 3.00%, are water. The Zuni River is a west-flowing tributary of the Little Colorado River, which it joins near Hunt, Arizona.

== Demographics ==
Historical population
Census	Pop.	Note	%±
2000	1,252		—
2010	1,323		5.7%
2020	1,190		−10.1%
U.S. Decennial Census

As of the census of 2000, there were 1,252 people, 319 households, and 283 families residing in the CDP. The population density was 740.1 inhabitants per square mile (285.8/km^{2}). There were 349 housing units at an average density of 206.3 per square mile (79.7/km^{2}). The racial makeup of the CDP was 89.70% Native American, 7.99% White, 0.24% from other races, 0.16% African American, 0.16% Asian, and 1.76% from two or more races. Hispanic or Latino of any race were 2.72% of the population.

There were 319 households, out of which 62.1% had children under the age of 18 living with them, 45.1% were married couples living together, 35.4% had a female householder with no husband present, and 11.0% were non-families. 9.7% of all households were made up of individuals, and 0.6% had someone living alone who was 65 years of age or older. The average household size was 3.88 and the average family size was 4.06.

In the CDP, the population was spread out, with 44.3% under the age of 18, 8.1% from 18 to 24, 33.8% from 25 to 44, 10.9% from 45 to 64, and 2.9% who were 65 years of age or older. The median age was 22 years. For every 100 females, there were 87.1 males. For every 100 females age 18 and over, there were 81.0 males.

The median income for a household in the CDP was $16,442, and the median income for a family was $14,950. Males had a median income of $17,105 versus $16,563 for females. The per capita income for the CDP was $6,952. About 57.2% of families and 61.8% of the population were below the poverty line, including 73.8% of those under age 18 and 100.0% of those age 65 or over.

== Education ==
It is in Zuni Public Schools. Zuni High School is the zoned high school.

== Transport ==
Tribally-run A:shiwi Transit connects Zuni Pueblo and Black Rock with Gallup.

== See also ==
- List of census-designated places in New Mexico

== See also ==
Media related to Black Rock, New Mexico at Wikimedia Commons
