= Effie Calavaza =

Native American Zuni jewelry artist (1927–2019)

- Born: February 15, 1927; Zuni, New Mexico
- Died: 2019 (aged 91–92)
- Occupation: Jewelry artist

Effie C. Calavaza (February 15, 1927 – 2019) was a Native American Zuni jewelry artist.

== Jewelry style ==
Calavaza started silversmithing in 1956 and learned the art from her husband, Juan. Her signature style depicts snakes winding around large gemstones—most commonly turquoise, coral, and onyx—set in sand-cast silver pieces including earrings, necklaces, rings, bracelets, watches, and belt buckles. Snakes are an important symbol in Zuni healing and fertility rituals. Experts in Native American art consider her an influential, prolific, and classic Zuni jewelry artist and her work is carried in jewelry galleries around the world.

== Personal life and death ==
Effie Calavaza was born in 1927 in Zuni, New Mexico as Effie Lankeseon, where she lived her entire life. She married Juan Calavaza (1910–1970), also a jewelry artist, who taught her the art. Until her husband died in 1970, she signed her own work with her husband's signature, "JUAN C.–ZUNI". Later, she signed her work "EFFIE C.–ZUNI" in 1/16 Gothic print.

Calavaza had three daughters—Georgiana Yatsatti, Gloria Jean Garcia, and Susie Calavaza. She continued to smith jewelry as well as supervise the jewelry work of her daughters throughout her life.

Calavaza died in 2019.
