= Zuni Public School District =

School district in New Mexico, United States

Address
- 12 Twin Buttes Drive ZUNI, New Mexico, 87327; United States

District information
- Type: Public
- Grades: PreK–12
- NCES District ID: 3502800

Students and staff
- Students: 1,232
- Teachers: 78.92 (FTE)
- Staff: 88.37 (FTE)
- Student–teacher ratio: 15.61

Other information
- Website: www.zpsd.org

Zuni Public School District (ZPSD) is a school district headquartered in the Zuni Pueblo census-designated place of unincorporated McKinley County, New Mexico, United States.

It includes sections in Cibola County and McKinley County (including Zuni Pueblo and Black Rock).

== History ==
Created on July 1, 1980, it was the first tribally controlled public school system in the United States. The last school district creation, prior to that of Zuni, occurred in 1950. Zuni School District, which largely coincides with the Zuni Indian Reservation, became the 89th school district in New Mexico. The initial prospective enrollment was 1,800, with 98% of them being Zuni people. Hayes Lewis, the acting superintendent, stated that the reason why the Zuni Pueblo community decided to leave the Gallup-McKinley County Schools system is because the Zuni people wanted to make their own educational decisions, and a Zuni had never been elected to the school board of the previous district. The Zuni people had attempted forming their own school district for about ten years prior.

In 1999 the district leadership criticized the New Mexico school district funding formulas, stating they are not enough to support the district.

== Schools ==
- Zuni High School
- Zuni Middle School
- Shiwi T'sana Elementary School (K-5) - It was scheduled to open in 2016 and replaced the A:shiwi and Dowa Yalanne schools.

Alternative school

- Twin Buttes Cyber Academy

Former schools (K-5)

- A:shiwi Elementary School - It began operations in the fall of 1992. It was in the east of the village. As of 2000 its enrollment was around 450.
- Dowa Yalanne Elementary School - As of 1999 its enrollment exceeded 500. It was in the southern portion of Zuni Pueblo.
- Twin Buttes High School (alternative school) - Its building, built in the 1930s, is in the Zuni style.
