= Tohatchi, New Mexico =

Tohatchi, New Mexico Tó Haachʼiʼ (Navajo)
- Census-designated place
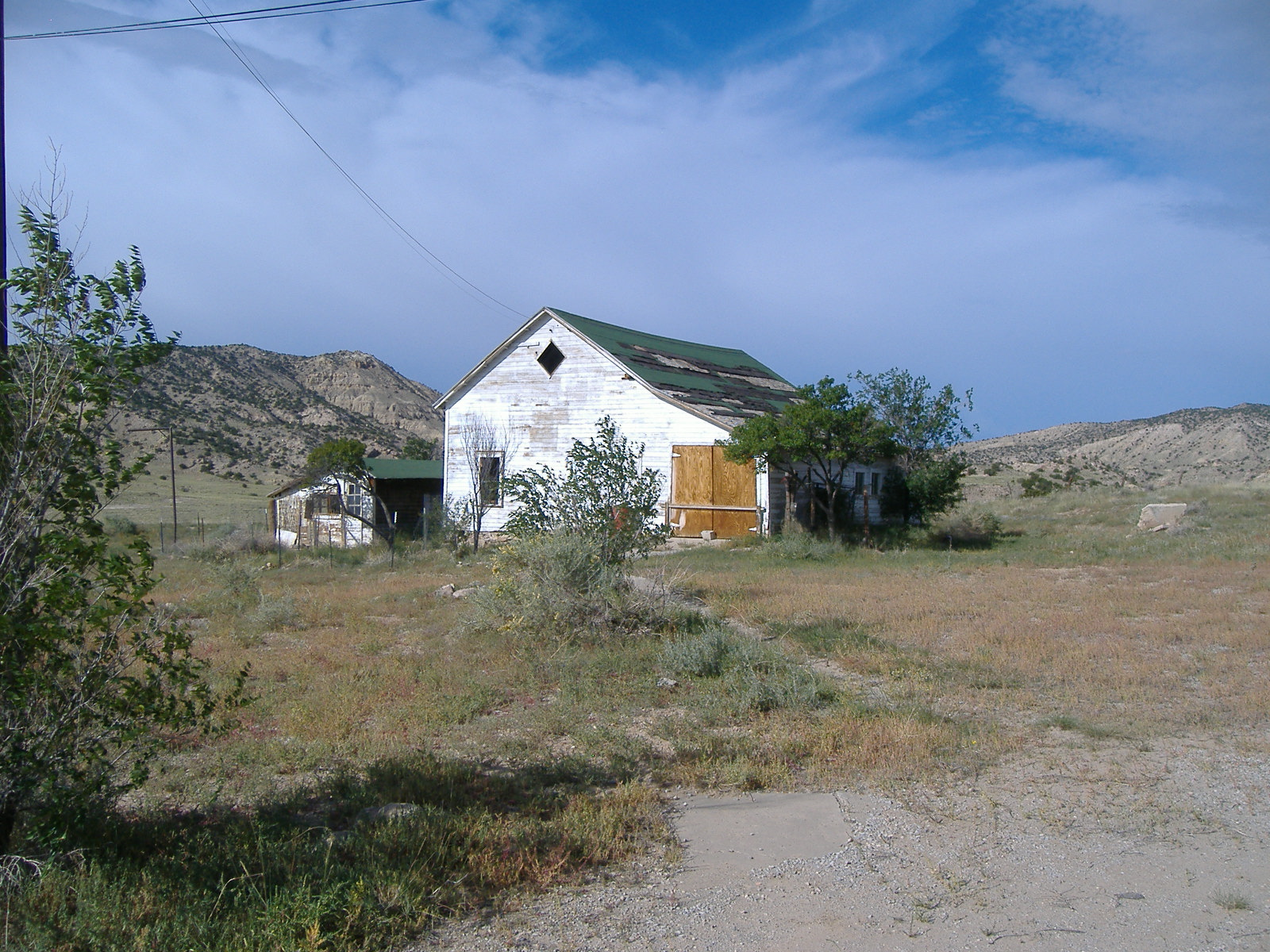
- Building in Tohatchi

- Location in McKinley County and the state of New Mexico

- Location in the United States Tohatchi (the United States)
- Coordinates: 35°51′30″N 108°44′50″W
- Country: United States
- State: New Mexico
- County: McKinley

Government
  - Type: Chapter (Navajo Nation)

Area
  - Total: 6.60 sq mi (17.09 km^{2})
  - Land: 6.47 sq mi (16.75 km^{2})
  - Water: 0.13 sq mi (0.33 km^{2})
- Elevation: 6,319 ft (1,926 m)

Population (2020)
  - Total: 785
  - Density: 121.4/sq mi (46.86/km^{2})
- Time zone: UTC-7 (Mountain (MST))
  - Summer (DST): UTC-6 (MDT)
- ZIP code: 87325
- Area code: 505
- FIPS code: 35-78440
- GNIS feature ID: 2409328

Tohatchi is a census-designated place (CDP) in McKinley County, New Mexico, United States. It is a health-services and education hub along Highway 491. Its population was reported to be 785 at the 2020 census. As Tohatchi is located on the Navajo Nation, it is designated federal trust land.

== History ==
The name (Navajo: Tó Haachʼiʼ) translates as "Water in rock ledge," or "water dug out". A settlement was built here around an Indian school established by the US government in 1897.

The Two Grey Hills Trading Post was established here soon thereafter, and as of 2025, is one of the few Navajo trading posts still in operation. The community is the center for Navajo weaving of the Two Grey Hills weaving patterns.

The design style of Two Grey Hills weaving is named for the trading post, and was first developed around 1910-1915. The patterns involve intricate geometric motifs based on four-fold symmetry. Historically they were woven with handspun natural (undyed) wool; later natural plant-based and commercial dyes were used, although most weavers create natural colors blends by combining wool of various colors from their sheep. These rugs are still woven today in Tohatchi; the weavings are known to have the highest wefts-per-inch counts of other local weavings.

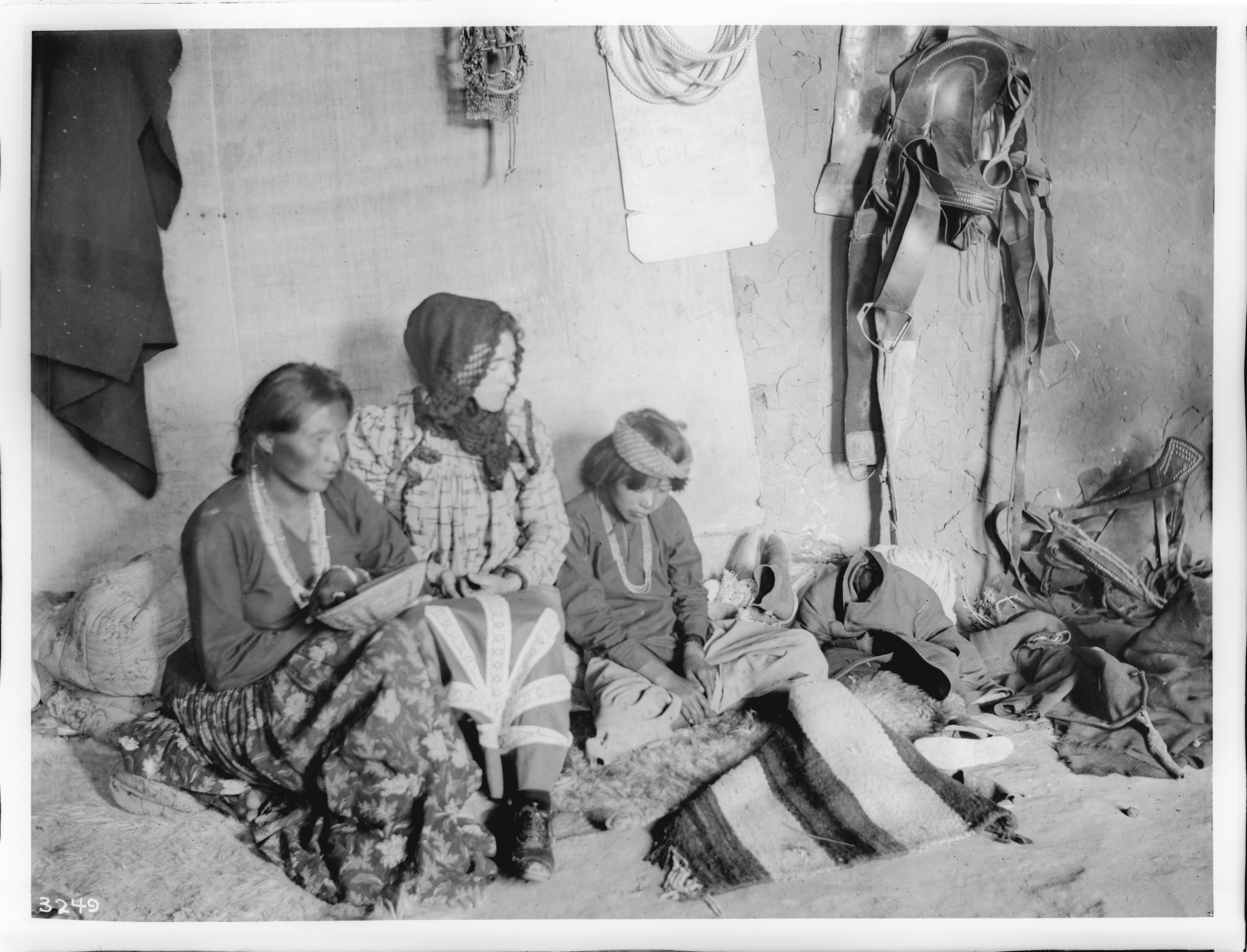
Family and teacher in a Navajo hogan, Tohatchi, New Mexico, 1901

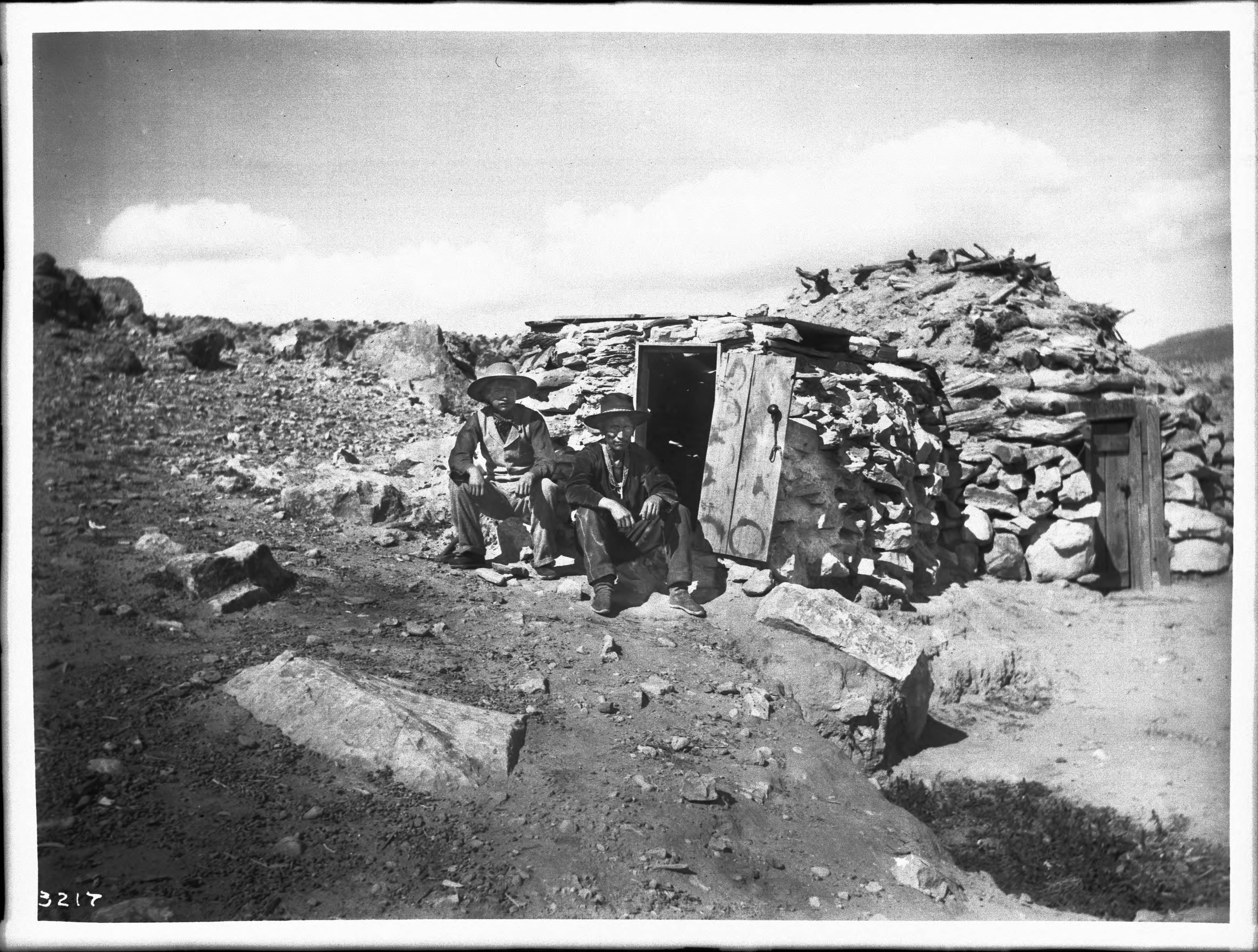
Peshliki, a Navajo Indian silversmith, and a friend outside his shop (and hogan) in Tohatchi, ca.1901

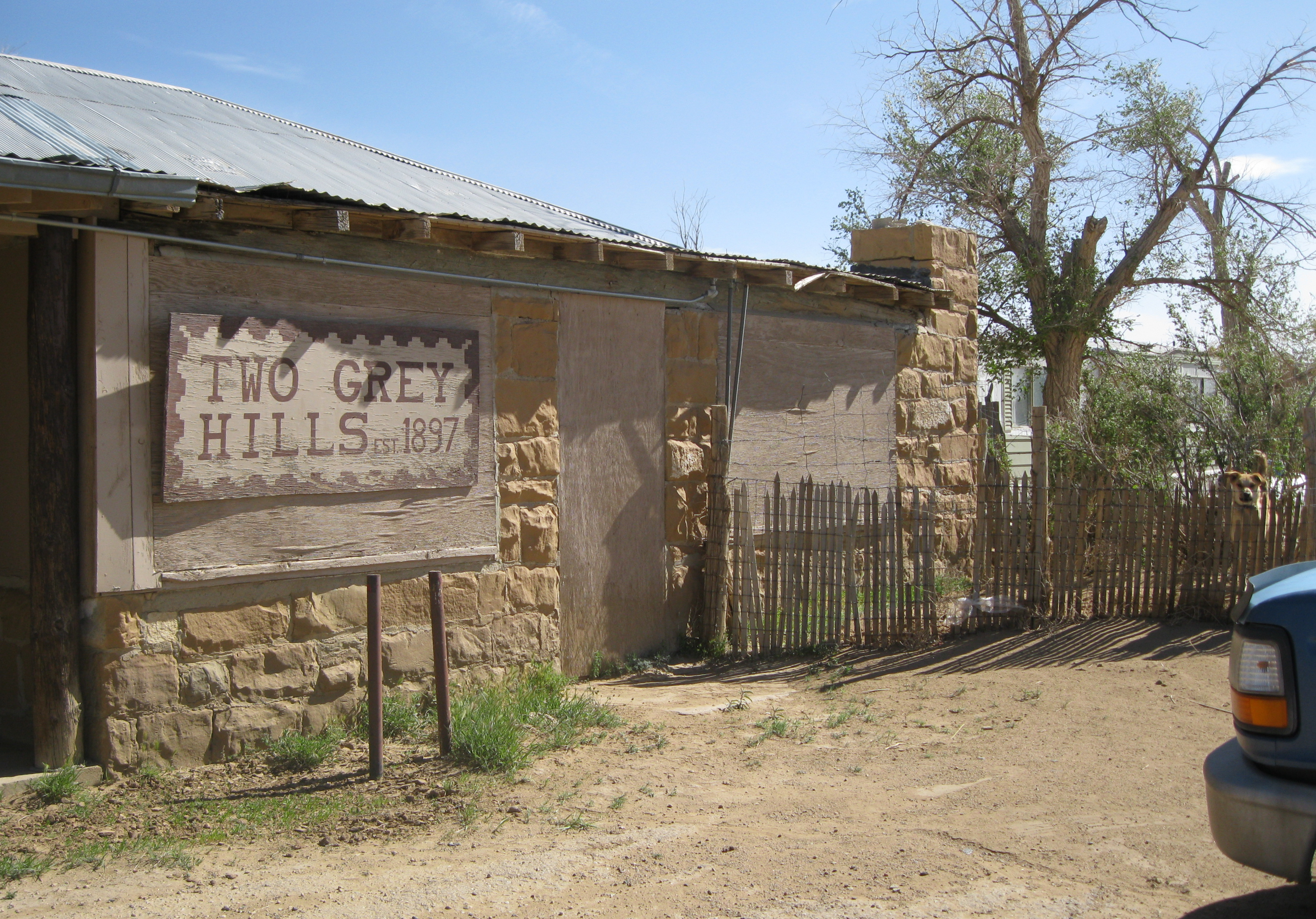
Two Grey Hills Trading Post

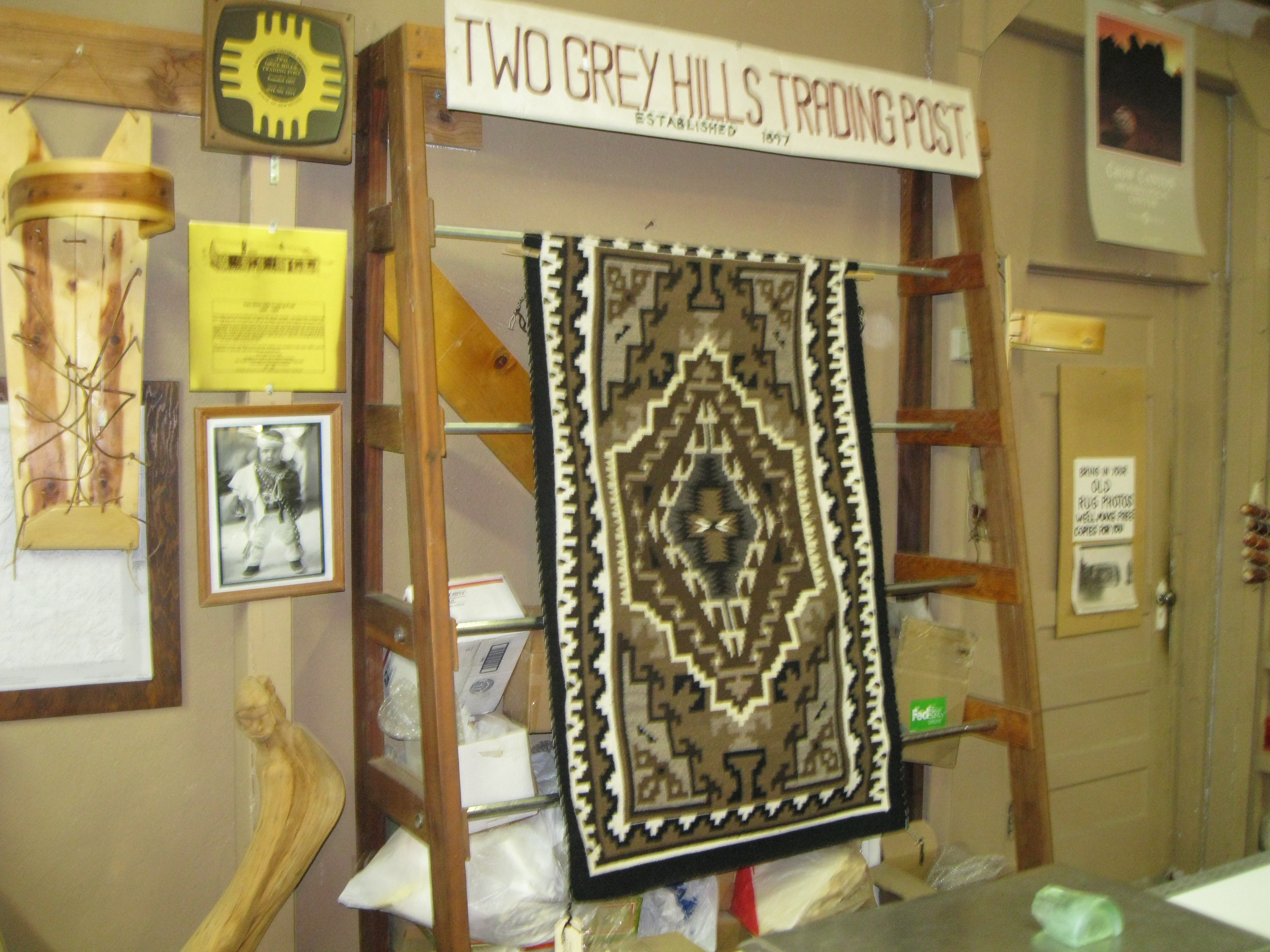
Two Grey Hills Trading Post

== Geography ==
Tohatchi is in northwestern McKinley County, along U.S. Route 491, which leads south 24 miles (39 km) to Gallup, the county seat, and north 69 miles (111 km) to Shiprock. According to the U.S. Census Bureau, the Tohatchi CDP has a total area of 6.6 square miles (17 km^{2}), of which 0.1 square miles (0.26 km^{2}), or 1.96%, are covered by water (Chuska Lake, on the eastern edge of the community). The CDP is drained by Red Willow Wash, passing through the center of the community, and its tributary Muddy Wash, running along the southern edge. Red Willow Wash runs northeast toward Coyote Wash, a tributary of the Chaco River and part of the San Juan River watershed.

== Demographics ==
Historical population
Census	Pop.	Note	%±
2000	1,037		—
2010	808		−22.1%
2020	785		−2.8%
U.S. Decennial Census

As of the census of 2020, 825 people and 244 households resided in the CDP. The population density was 46.86 inhabitants per square mile (18.09/km^{2}). There were 263 housing units, of which 244 were occupied. The racial makeup of the CDP was 89.0% Native American, 4.7% White, 0.5% African American, 3.3% Asian, 0.8% from some other race, and 1.7% from two or more races. Hispanics or Latinos of any race were 3.9% of the population.

Of the 244 households, 33.6% had children under 18 living with them, 43.0% were married or cohabiting couples, 39.3% had a female householder with no spouse or partner present, and 17.6% had a male householder with no spouse or partner present. About 21.3% of all households were made up of individuals, and 9.8% were someone living alone who was 65 or older.

In the CDP, the age distribution was 24.3% under 18, 8.0% from 18 to 24, 28.6% from 25 to 44, 22.3% from 45 to 64, and 16.8% who were 65 or older. The median age was 37.6 years. For every 100 females, there were 85.6 males. For every 100 females 18 and over, there were 87.4 males.

== Government ==
Tohatchi has a chapter house, a local administrative office that governs a part of the Fort Defiance Agency of the Navajo Nation.

== Education ==
=== Gallup-McKinley County Schools ===
Three public schools in Tohatchi are operated by Gallup McKinley County Schools: Tohatchi Elementary School, Tohatchi Middle School, and Tohatchi High School.

=== BIE/BIA schools ===
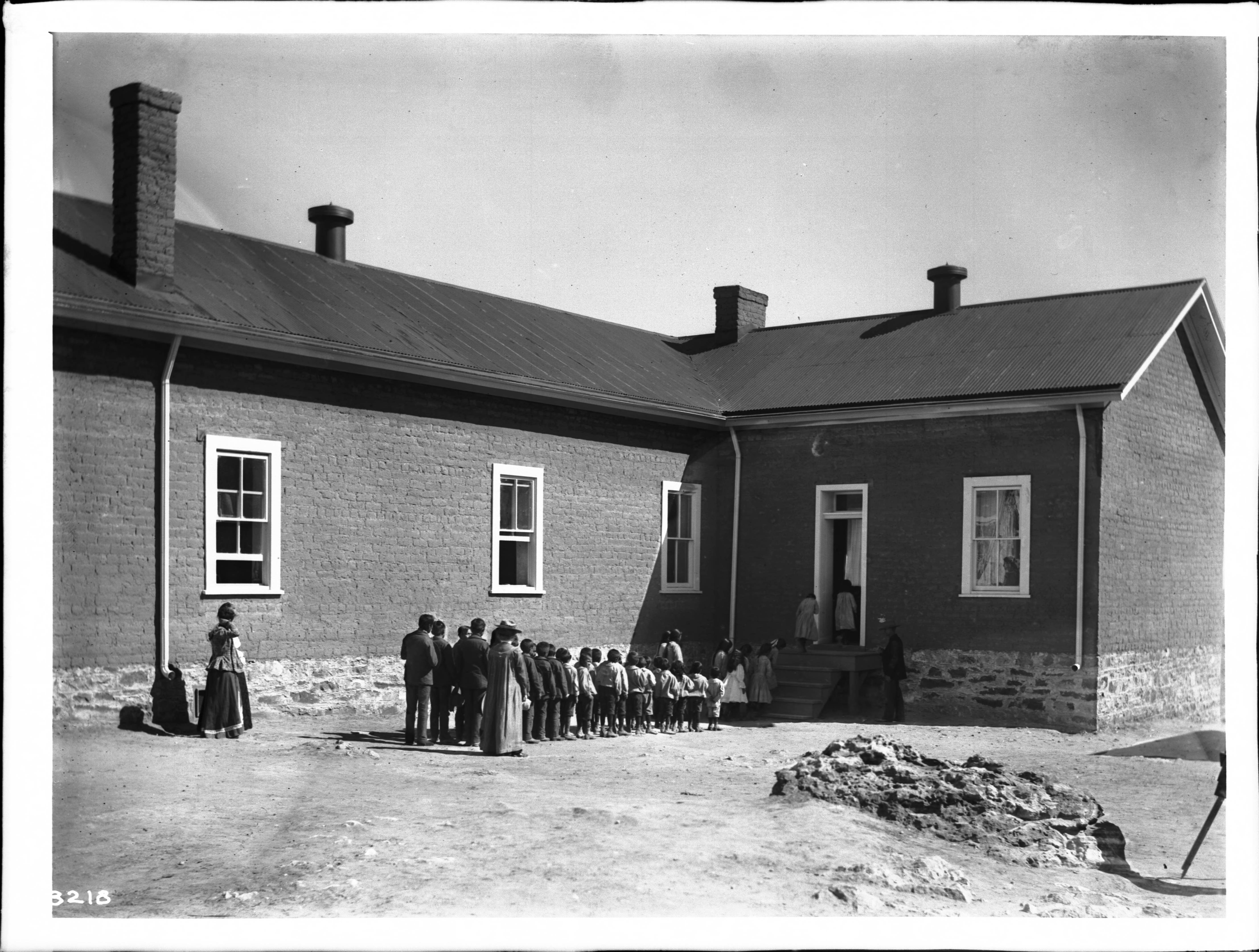
Tohatchi Boarding School, circa 1901

Formerly Chuska Boarding School, Ch'ooshgai Community School is a grant school boarding facility of the Bureau of Indian Education that offers kindergarten through eighth grade.

The Bureau of Indian Affairs previously had a bureau-operated boarding school, Tohatchi Boarding School, but it was shut down after the addition of public schools to Tohatchi. Cindy Yurth of the Navajo Times described it as one of the first such schools on the Navajo Indian Reservation. Its students included children from Tuba City, Arizona. According to Tohatchi Chapter President Edwin Begay, his father told him that the townsite was formerly an area maintained by the school to have swine. In 1979, the school had Navajo-language classes and one of the few Navajo school principals on the Navajo Nation at the time, Phillip Belone.

=== Private school ===
A private, non-profit facility for students with special needs began in 1976 at Chuska Boarding School. The program aimed to provide opportunities for engaging in life skills, academics, and vocational education, as an effort to develop and maintain special education services for the local indigenous community. Called "A School for Me, Inc.", it served 76 students in 1977 and only 58 in 1982.

== In popular culture ==
The 1965 film The Hallelujah Trail was shot in nearby locations with the Chuska Mountains serving as backdrop to some scenes.

Jim Chee, fictional Navajo Police officer in several Tony Hillerman crime novels, is said to have attended the boarding school here.

== Notable people ==
- Jennifer Nez Denetdale, educator
- Manuelito, Navajo tribal leader
- Cassandra Manuelito-Kerkvliet, Navajo academic administrator
- Barbara Teller Ornelas, Navajo weaver
- Shannon Pinto, politician
- Daisy Taugelchee, Navajo weaver
- Aneva J. Yazzie, industrial engineer

== See also ==
- List of census-designated places in New Mexico
