= Zuni High School =

High school in New Mexico, United States

Location
- Black Rock, New Mexico; United States
- Coordinates: 35.0822°N 108.8051°W

Information
- Type: Public
- Established: 1956; 70 years ago
- School district: Zuni Public School District (1980–); Gallup-McKinley County Schools (1956–1980)
- Principal: Don Sparks (2015–present)
- Teaching staff: 25.90 FTE
- Grades: 9–12
- Enrollment: 295 (2024–2025)
- Campus type: Rural
- Website: zhs.zpsd.org

Zuni High School (ZHS) is a public high school in Black Rock, New Mexico, with a Zuni Pueblo postal address. It is a part of the Zuni Public School District.

It includes sections in Cibola County and McKinley County (including Zuni Pueblo and Black Rock).

== History ==
It was previously a part of the Gallup-McKinley County Schools. It was built in 1956, making it the first public high school in the community. It included 16 teacher housing units.

In 1968, Ramah High School in Ramah, New Mexico closed, meaning students in that area would be bussed to Zuni High School. Several area students took two buses each, with Ramah being the transfer point.

Circa 1977 the dropout rate was 43%. Of any New Mexico high school, this was the highest such rate. In 1980 the school was transferred into the control of the Zuni School District.

In 1997, the school had fewer than 400 students. In the fall of that year groundbreaking of the current building occurred.

== Curriculum ==
In 1974, the school began a course called "Publication", about Zuni culture and history, which could be used for Social Studies or English credits.

== See also ==
- Zuni Indian Reservation
