= Crownpoint High School =

High school in New Mexico, United States

Coordinates: 35.6924°N 108.1571°W

Location
- 1 Eagle Drive; Crownpoint, McKinley, New Mexico 87313; United States

Information
- School type: Public High School
- School district: Gallup-McKinley County Schools
- NCES School ID: 350111000301
- Principal: Kelly Morris
- Teaching staff: 19.00 (FTE)
- Grades: 9-12
- Enrollment: 370 (2023-2024)
- Student to teacher ratio: 19.47
- Colors: Red & Black
- Athletics conference: NMAA 3A
- Mascot: Eagle
- Website: https://cph.gmcs.org/

Crownpoint High School is a public high school in Crownpoint, New Mexico. It is a part of the Gallup McKinley County Schools district.

Its attendance boundary includes Crownpoint and Borrego Pass.

== History ==
By 1970 J. V. Walker and Associates conducted a review of school practices. An ad hoc committee was formed with six members to review the school's practices. It found no intentional misconduct.

On May 7, 1974, the district rehired Zane Smith as the principal, and it also rehired the assistant principal, after some community individuals asked them to do so, despite the school board initially leaning towards not retaining them. Despite twenty residents, including some students and parents, asking the school board to reconsider, the school board did not reverse its decision as not enough board members were present to form a quorum.

== Curriculum ==
In 1973 the school began teaching horticulture.
