= Zuni River =

River in Arizona, US

Zuñi River
- Location of the mouth of the Zuni River in Arizona Zuni River (the United States)
- Native name: Akwałina (Zuni)

Location
- Country: United States
- States: Arizona; New Mexico
- Counties: Apache, AZ (Cibola, McKinley, Valencia) NM

Physical characteristics
- Source: confluence of Rio Pescado and Rio Nutria
  - location: near Black Rock, Zuni Indian Reservation, New Mexico
  - coordinates: 35°06′38″N 108°42′56″W
  - elevation: 6,535 ft (1,992 m)
- Mouth: Little Colorado River
  - location: Hunt Valley, Arizona
  - coordinates: 34°38′44″N 109°40′28″W
  - elevation: 5,407 ft (1,648 m)
- Basin size: 1,300 sq mi (3,400 km^{2})

The Zuni (Zuñi) River (Zuni: Akwałina) is a tributary of the Little Colorado River in the southwestern United States. It has its origin in Cibola County, New Mexico, in the Zuñi Mountains at the Continental Divide. The river flows off the western slopes of the Zuñi Mountains in a generally southwesterly direction through the Zuni Indian Reservation to join the Little Colorado River in eastern Arizona. The Zuni River is approximately 90 miles (140 km) long, and has a drainage basin in New Mexico of approximately 1,300 square miles (3,400 km^{2}).

== Course ==
The Zuñi River begins about 4.5 miles east-northeast of Black Rock at the confluence of the Rio Pescado and Rio Nutria. It was dammed at Black Rock in 1908 forming the Black Rock Reservoir. The river has a small dam at the Zuni Pueblo. The river is intermittent, drying up during drought periods, and often during most of the winter, except where there are perennial springs that give it surface flow for a short distance.

== Fossils ==
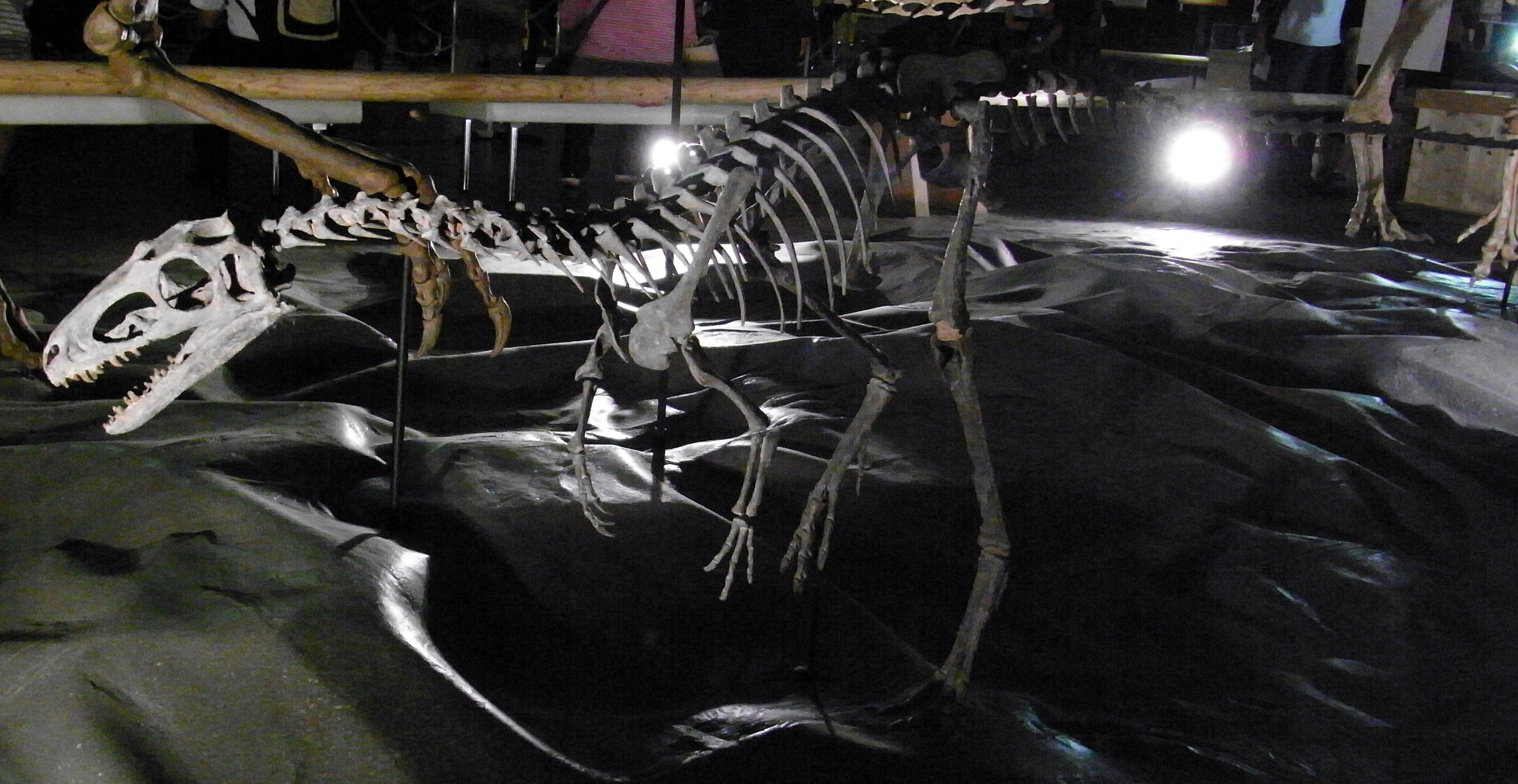
Suskityrannus mount at Dino Kingdom 2012

The Zuni Basin is home to the Moreno Hill Formation where fossils from the later Cretaceous 92 Mya. Fossils include dinosaurs like Zuniceratops and Suskityrannus (Zuni Coelurosaur).

== Environment ==
The Zuni River is one of the last remaining habitats of the Zuni bluehead sucker.

== Religious aspect ==
The Zuni River is sacred to the Zuni people. Every four years, a religious pilgrimage is made on the "Barefoot Trail" to Kołuwala:wa, also called "Zuni Heaven", at the confluence of the Zuni River and the Little Colorado.

== See also ==
- List of rivers of Arizona
- List of rivers of New Mexico
