= Borrego Pass Trading Post =

- Borrego Pass Trading Post Historic District
- U.S. National Register of Historic Places
- Location within New Mexico
- Location: Bldg. 1601, Co. Rd. 19, Borrego Pass, New Mexico
- Coordinates: 35°39′26″N 108°06′20″W
- Area: 12 acres (4.9 ha)
- Built: 1927
- Built by: Harvey, Ben & Anna; Cousins, Bill &; Smouse, D. & F. Frances Bloomfield
- Architectural style: One-story rubble stone
- NRHP reference No.: 11000475
- Added to NRHP: March 29, 2012

The Borrego Pass Trading Post, at Borrego Pass, New Mexico, is a historic trading post. The post and associated structures and sites were listed on the National Register of Historic Places as the Borrego Pass Trading Post Historic District in 2012. It includes, or has also been known as, the Ben Harvey Trading Post. The listing was for a 12 acres (4.9 ha) historic district which included 11 contributing buildings, two contributing structures, and four contributing sites.

It is a traditional Navajo trading post, significant also for association with the Church of Jesus Christ of Latter-day Saints; like many trading posts it was operated by Anglos, and mainly served Navajos. The Borrego Pass Trading Post was established in 1927 by Ben and Anna Harvey.

The Borrego Pass community formed around the trading post which was opened in 1927 and was first operated by Ben and Anna Harvey, and then starting in 1935 by Bill and Jean Cousins. It was sold in 1939 to Don and Fern Smouse who operated it for over forty years. The trading post was named after the nearby Borrego Pass an ancient water gap, across the Continental Divide, that cuts into the Dutton Plateau.

It was recommended for National Register listing in 2010.

Location: Building 1601, County Road 19 Other names: Tiish Bito (Snake Spring); Dibe Yazhi Habitiin (Lamb Route) Historic function: Commerce/trade; Religion Historic subfunction: Department Store; Religious Structure
