= Navajo Pine High School =

School in Navajo, New Mexico, United States

Coordinates: 35.9043°N 109.0368°W

- Navajo, McKinley County, New Mexico; United States

Information
- Established: 1986; 40 years ago
- Website: www.gmcs.org/o/nphs/

Navajo Pine High School is a public high school in Navajo, New Mexico. It is a part of Gallup-McKinley County Schools.

The school was established in 1986. By July, Tom Arviso of the Navajo Times stated that the likely rumor was that the warrior was chosen as the high school mascot, even though the school itself did not yet make an announcement on this.

== Curriculum ==
As of 2021 it includes a personal finance class and is one of two New Mexico high schools to require students to pass such a class.

== Demographics ==
In 1987, according to a school counselor, the majority of the ethnic Navajo students at the school followed the majority American culture and do not follow traditional Navajo culture, and a portion of them did not have fluency in the Navajo language.
