= Daisy Taugelchee =

Navajo weaver

- Born: c. 1909; Navajo Nation
- Died: September 8, 1990; Farmington, New Mexico
- Known for: Textile weaving
- Style: Two Grey Hills

Daisy Taugelchee (c. 1909 – September 8, 1990) was a Navajo weaver. The Denver Art Museum declared Taugelchee as "widely considered the most talented Navajo weaver and spinner who ever lived". In 2004 one of her rugs was featured on a United States Postal Service stamp.

== Biography ==
Various dates are given for Taugelchee's birth, including 1909, circa 1910, 1911, and circa 1920. In her obituary, her birth date was given as April 4, 1909. She was born on the Navajo Nation reservation in Arizona.

Taugelchee's paternal grandmother was an accomplished weaver known as Sagebrush Hill Woman, herself one of the best of the early Toadlena/Two Grey Hills weavers. Taugelchee's sister was also a well-regarded weaver. Taugelchee's mother died in childbirth when she was six years old, and her father died when she was eleven. In her youth, Daisy was known as Little Man's Daughter (Hastiin Yazhi Bitsi) and was given the name Daisy Marion Yazzie when she went to school. She attended Albuquerque Indian School for a few years and Phoenix Indian School for another two years.

In her twenties, she married a man named Chee Taugelchee. They had three children, Chee Jr., Chester, and Janie Norris.

She stopped weaving in her later years, but continued assisting the weaving projects of her daughter-in-law, Priscilla Taugelchee. Taugelchee died September 8, 1990, in Farmington, New Mexico.

== Artwork ==
Taugelchee's style is reflective of the Two Grey Hills style, named for the Two Grey Hills trading post at Tohatchi in northwestern New Mexico. Like other weavers in this style, Taugelchee's works are characterized by intricate geometric designs woven with very finely handspun, primarily undyed wool. She and other master weavers attained a yarn count of 140 threads per inch. The designs often feature complex stepped or serrated diamond of several layers, enclosed in a border or multiple borders. The sheep in the area grow wool in a variety of tan, gray, brown, and gold colors; usually only black wool is enhanced with dye.

She was reputedly the highest paid weaver in the world in the 1950s. Her works were the most expensive rugs in the trade and she sometimes received thousands of dollars for a single tapestry. Taugelchee had a close relationship with Charles Herring, the owner of the Two Grey Hills trading post, who encouraged weavers to push themselves artistically.

Taugelchee regularly won first and grand prizes (best in show) at the Gallup Inter-Tribal Indian Ceremonial. For forty years, she won consistently at the show, including taking both first and grand prizes in 1946. Her fine weaving ability led to several new classifications being instituted at the ceremonial.

== Recognition and legacy ==
Taugelchee taught many weavers her craft, as well as inspiring others with her skill and artistic vision. She also demonstrated her technique and lectured throughout the United States.

One of Taugelchee's tapestries was featured by the United States Postal Service on a 37 cent stamp in 2004 as part of a set titled "Art of the American Indian." The work featured on the stamp was acquired by the Denver Art Museum in 1948; the rug required six miles of yarn to make and was one of Taugelchee's most difficult pieces.
