= Tohatchi High School =

Public high school in Tohatchi, New Mexico

Coordinates: 35.862°N 108.752°W

Location
- Cougar Ln. N, US-491

Information
- Type: Public high school
- Established: 1971
- School district: Gallup-McKinley County Schools
- NCES School ID: 35011100031
- Grades: 9-12
- Enrollment: 279 (As of 2024-25)
- Website: https://toh.gmcs.org/

Tohatchi High School is a public high school in Tohatchi, New Mexico. It is a part of Gallup-McKinley County Schools.

Communities in its attendance boundary include Tohatchi, Brimhall Nizohini, Nakaibito, and Twin Lakes.

== History ==
The original building had a capacity of 250. By 1975, the enrollment was at 750, and the school district was forming plans to build a new school; the district planned to spend $6,696,000, with a grant paid with federal funds covering just under $6,700,000 of that. September 1977 was the earliest anticipated opening date. The district was using weather data supplied by a Tohatchi High student, using a small weather station, as part of the district's plans. The federal grant funding arrived in 1977.

Osmond Charles "Chick" Fero, in fall 1983 became the principal of Tohatchi High. There were three other people considered for the position. In 1985 he resigned after he was accused of murdering superintendent Paul Hanson, and Carl Montoya took his position. Fero was convicted and sentenced to life imprisonment.

== Curriculum ==
The school began a woodworking program in 1972.

In the 1976–1977 school year the school started a class on making rugs in the Navajo style, which was part of a program to add elements of Navajo culture to the coursework. It was the only such class in the school district.
