= Navajo Technical University =

University

- Type: Public tribal land-grant university
- Established: 1979
- President: Dr. Elmer Guy
- Dean: Dr. Casmir Agbaraji
- Students: 1,777
- Location: Crownpoint, New Mexico, United States; 35°41′14.6″N 108°8′51.0″W
- Campus: Urban/suburban reserve
- Sporting affiliations: NAIA – Division II Independent
- Mascot: Skyhawk
- Website: www.navajotech.edu

Navajo Technical University (NTU) is a public tribal land-grant university in Crownpoint and Kirtland, New Mexico, with sites in the towns of Chinle, Arizona and Teec Nos Pos, Arizona. NTU is the largest tribal college in the country and is a 1994 land grant university. It has been accredited by the Higher Learning Commission since 2005 and is home to the first accredited veterinary technician program on an Indian reservation.

== History ==
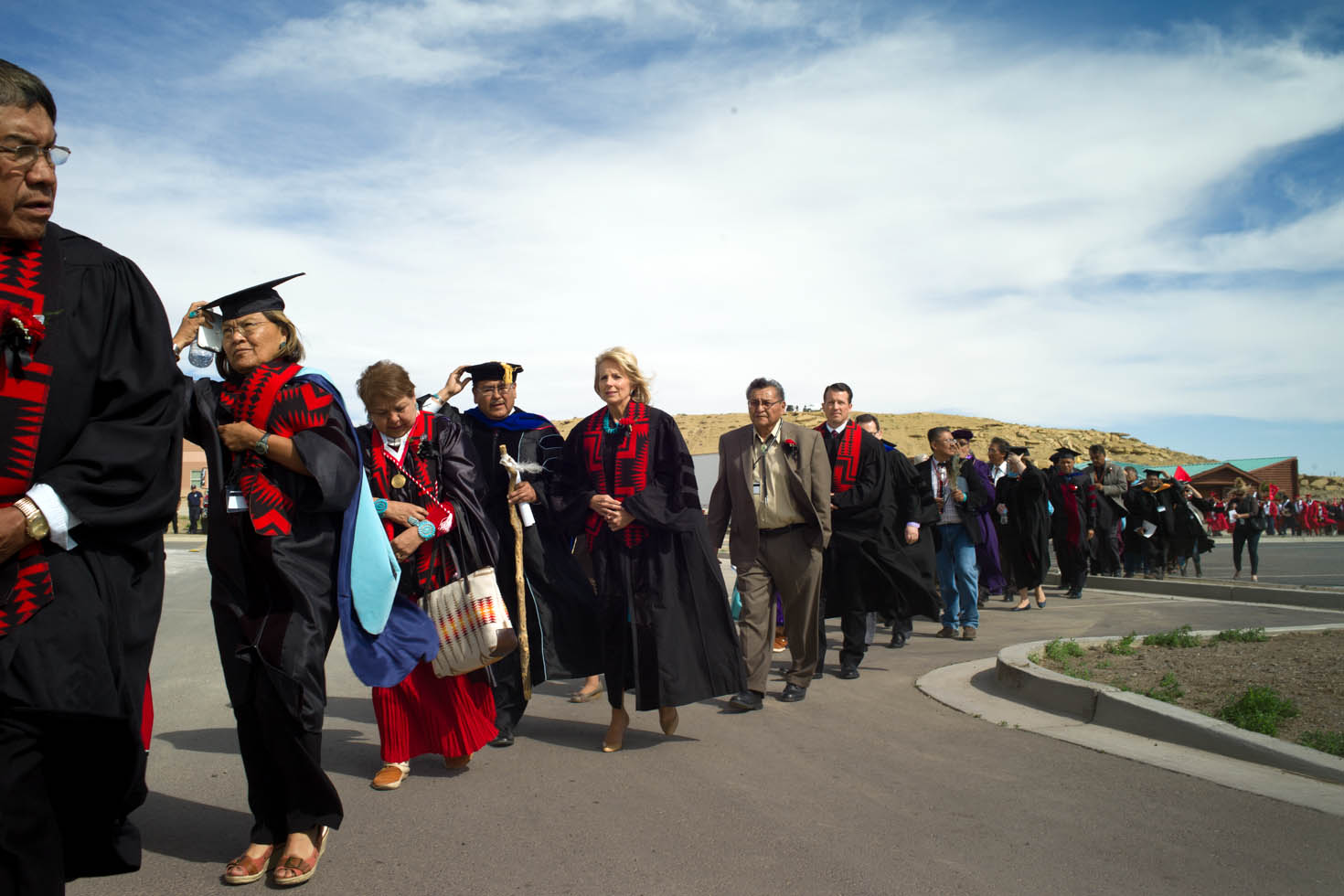
Jill Biden visited the college in 2013 during graduation.

Navajo Technical University was chartered by the Navajo Nation in 1979 as the Navajo Skill Center and sought to meet the needs of its unemployed population. After expanding the school's mission, the Center was renamed Crownpoint Institute of Technology in 1985. The institution was designated a land-grant college in 1994 alongside 31 other tribal colleges. In 2006, the Navajo Nation Council approved changing its name to Navajo Technical College. The institution's name was changed once more in 2013 to its current name, Navajo Technical University.

== Services ==
NTU provides support services including:

- student and faculty housing (Crownpoint site only)
- a childcare center
- computer technologies
- comprehensive library services

== Academics ==
NTU offers a variety of academic programs, including certificates, associate degrees, bachelor's degree, and a Master of Arts degree in Diné Studies. As of 2011, it is one of seven tribal colleges in the U.S. to offer a degree related to tribal administration. In 2023, the university introduced a doctoral program in Diné language and culture.

== Partnerships ==
NTU is a member of the American Indian Higher Education Consortium (AIHEC), a community of tribally- and federally-chartered institutions. NTU was created in response to the higher education needs of American Indians. It generally serves geographically isolated populations that have no other means of accessing education beyond the high school level.

== Student life ==
Undergraduate demographics as of Fall 2023
Race and ethnicity	Total
American Indian/Alaska Native	97%
Black	1%
Hispanic	1%
Economic diversity
Low-income (Note: The percentage of students who received an income-based federal Pell grant intended for low-income students.)	60%
Affluent (Note: The percentage of students who are a part of the American middle class at the bare minimum.)	40%
