= Zuni Indian Reservation =

Native American tribe and reservation in New Mexico

Coordinates: 35°01′05″N 108°48′45″W

Zuni Tribe of the Zuni Reservation A:shiwi (Zuni)
- Reservation
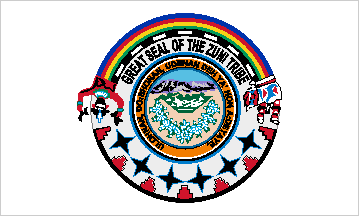
- Flag

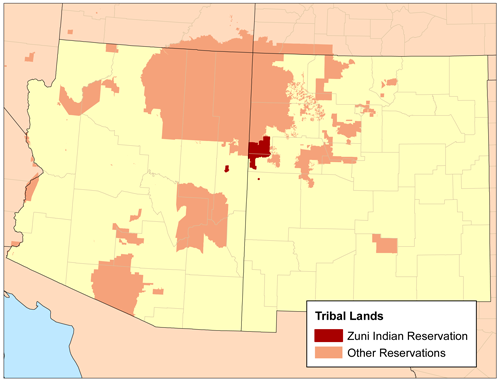
- Country: United States
- State: New Mexico, Arizona
- County: McKinley, Cibola, Apache County, Arizona

Government
  - Governor: Arden Kucatee (2025)
  - Lieutenant Governor: Cordelia Hooeee (2025)

Population (2010)Enrolled tribal members
  - Total: 7,891
- Time zone: MT/MDT
- Website: Official site of the Zuni tribe

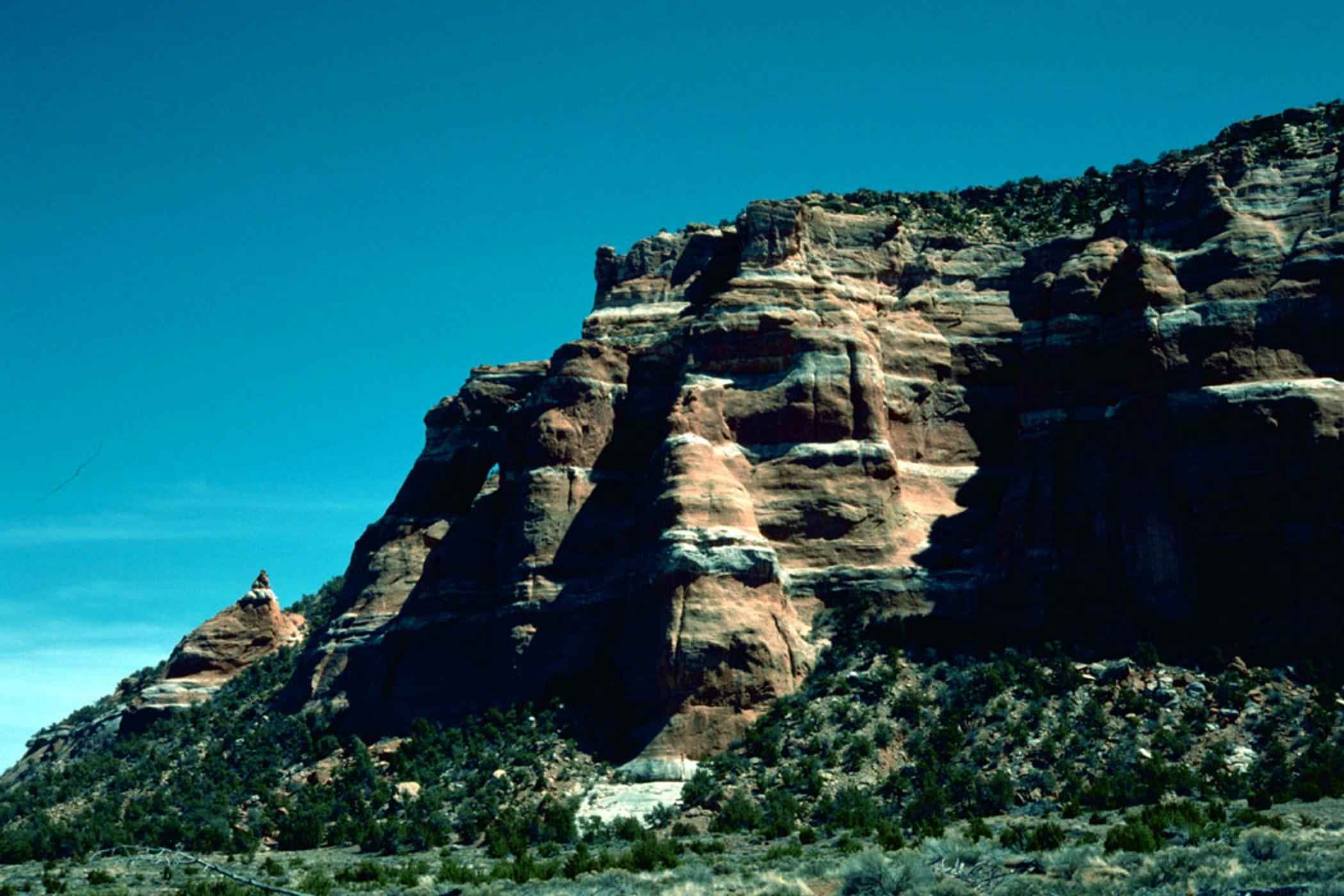
Rock formations on Zuni land

The Zuni Tribe of the Zuni Reservation is a federally recognized tribe and Indian reservation of Zuni people in western New Mexico. In Zuni language, the Zuni Pueblo people are referred to as A:shiwi, and the Zuni homeland is referred to as Halona Idiwan’a meaning "Middle Place". The primary settlement and seat of government of the reservation is Zuni Pueblo, New Mexico.

== Location ==
Map of Zuni Indian Reservation

The reservation lies in the Zuni River valley and is located primarily in McKinley and Cibola counties in western New Mexico, about 150 miles (240 km) west of Albuquerque. There are also several smaller non-contiguous sections in Apache County, Arizona, northwest of the city of St. Johns.

The main part of the reservation borders the state of Arizona to the west and the Ramah Navajo Reservation to the east. The main reservation is surrounded by the Painted Cliffs, the Zuni Mountains, and the Cibola National Forest. The reservation's total land area is 723.343 sq mi (1,873.45 km²).

As noted above, the Zuni Tribe also has land holdings in Apache County, Arizona, and Catron County, New Mexico, that do not border the main reservation.

== Government ==
The Zuni Tribe is governed by an elected governor, lieutenant governor, and a six-member tribal council with elections being held every four years. The governor is the administrative head of the tribal council, which is the final decision-making body on the reservation. The council oversees finances, business decisions, taxes, and contracts.

The administration of the Pueblo of Zuni in 2025 is:

- Governor: Arden Kucate
- Lieutenant Governor: Cordelia Hooee

== Population ==
The population was reported at 7,891 inhabitants in the 2010 census. Almost all of the population lives in the reservation headquarters community of Zuni Pueblo, located near the reservation's center, or in nearby Black Rock, to its east.

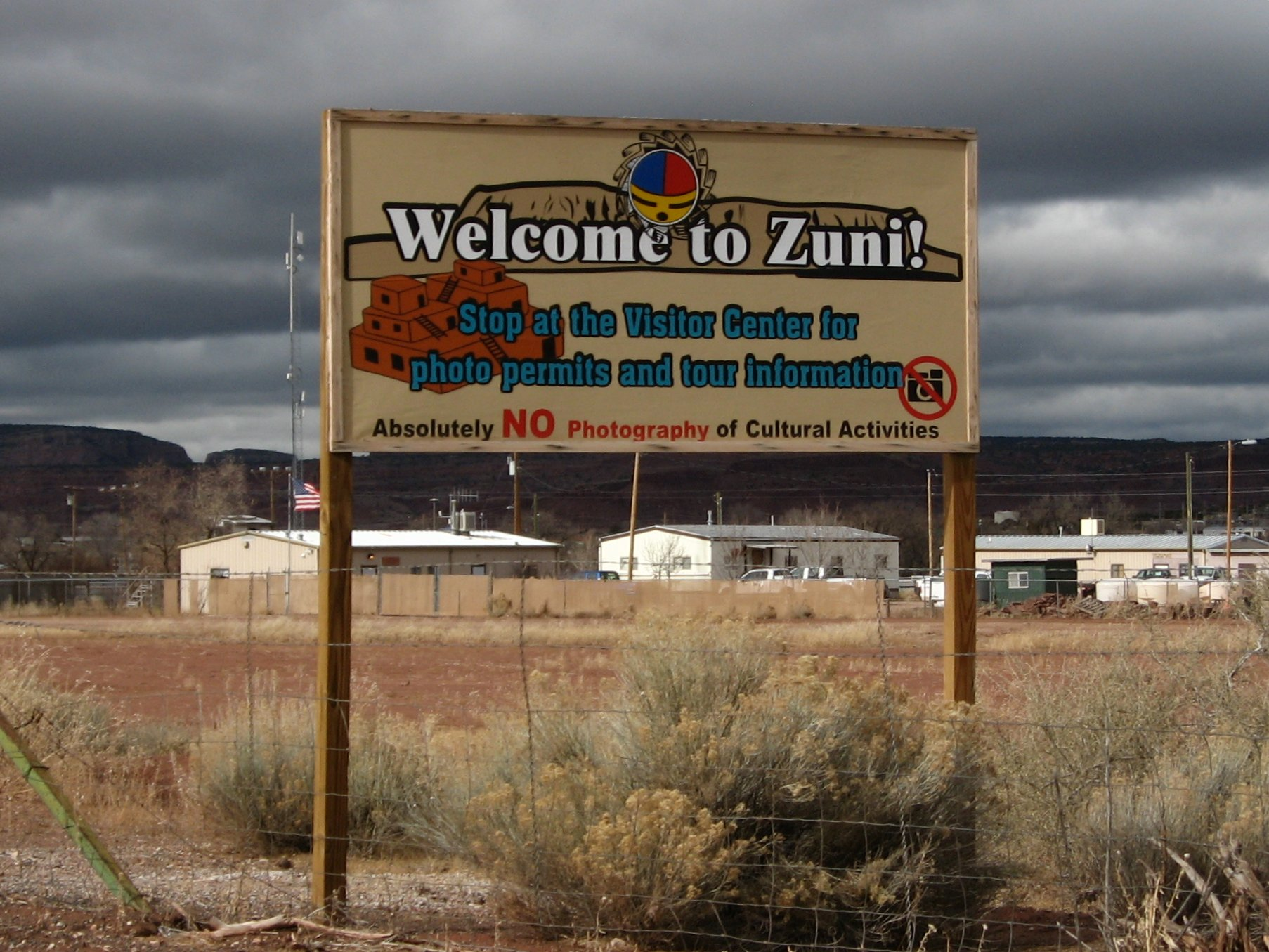
Welcome to Zuni!

== History and main features ==
Also on the main reservation are the Hawikuh Ruins. The ancient Zuni pueblo of Hawikuh was the largest of the Seven Cities of Cibola. It was established in the 13th century and abandoned in 1680. It was also the first pueblo seen by the Spanish explorers. The African scout Estevanico was the first non-Native to reach this area.

The largest town on the reservation is Zuni Pueblo, New Mexico, which is the seat of tribal government. Also on the reservation are the towns of Black Rock and Pescado. There is a branch campus of the University of New Mexico located in Zuni.

== Education ==
The sections in Cibola and McKinley counties in New Mexico are zoned to the Zuni Public Schools. Zuni High School is the zoned high school.

== See also ==
- List of Indian reservations in the United States

== Bibliography ==
- Zuni Reservation and Off-Reservation Trust Land, New Mexico/Arizona United States Census Bureau
