= Hunt, Arizona =

Populated place in Apache County, Arizona

- Populated place
- Location within the state of Arizona Hunt (the United States)
- Coordinates: 34°36′36″N 109°37′39″W
- Country: United States
- State: Arizona
- County: Apache
- Elevation: 5,433 ft (1,656 m)
- Time zone: UTC-7 (Mountain (MST))
  - Summer (DST): UTC-7 (MST)
- Area code: 928
- FIPS code: 04-34680
- GNIS feature ID: 24468

Hunt is a populated place situated on the Little Colorado River at the mouth of Concho Creek in Apache County, Arizona, United States. It is named after Colonel James Hunt, who served at Fort Apache in the 1870s.
