= Coyote Wash (Chaco River tributary) =

Stream in New Mexico, United States

Coyote Wash is a tributary stream of the Chaco River, on the Navajo Nation in San Juan County and McKinley County, New Mexico. Its mouth is located at the turn of the Great Bend of the Chaco River at an elevation of 5,476 feet / 1,669 meters in San Juan County. Its source is at 35°46′57″N 108°37′10″W, at the confluence of the streams of Window Rock Canyon and Coyote Canyon at an elevation of 6,080 feet.
