= Gallup-McKinley County Schools =

School district in New Mexico, United States

Gallup-McKinley County Schools (GMCS) is a school district based in Gallup, New Mexico which serves students from Gallup and surrounding areas of McKinley County.

== History ==
Prior to 1980, the district had 5,500 square miles (14,000 km^{2}) of land. That year parts left to form the Zuni School District.

Previously the Bureau of Indian Affairs (BIA) operated Manuelito Hall in Gallup, a dormitory which housed Native American students attending Gallup-McKinley schools. In 1973 it had about 300 students. That year the BIA closed Manuelito Hall, planning to move students to various boarding schools. The public school system's funding was not anticipated to be harmed by this closure. There were some families that wanted their children to remain at Gallup-McKinley schools as they perceived them to be better than BIA schools.

On March 12, 1984, Paul Hanson became the superintendent. On Friday February 22, 1985, Hanson was murdered in his office at the GMCS headquarters via gunshot. Hanson was the only person to sustain injuries. A bullet entered an adjacent conference room. Roland Carey became the interim superintendent, and the district sought to find a permanent replacement. Osmond Charles "Chick" Fero, previously principal of Tohatchi High School, was convicted of murdering Hanson, and was sentenced to life imprisonment. Fero learned that Hanson wanted him to voluntarily leave his position, and if Fero did not do this, Hanson would bring the issue to the board of trustees so the board could decide whether Fero would stay in his job.

== Service area ==
The district serves all of McKinley County except for sections in the Zuni Reservation.

In addition to sections of McKinley County, the district takes students from Ramah Navajo Indian Reservation, including Pinehill, which is in Cibola County. The proximity of the nearest schools in Cibola County were so far, 50 miles (80 km) away, that Cibola and McKinley counties agreed to have students on the reservation sent to McKinley County schools. The reservation is physically within the Grants/Cibola County Schools district.

It has 4,857 square miles (12,580 km^{2}) of territory, making it the largest NM school district by area.

== Demographics ==
In 1995 most of the students were Navajo (Diné) people, including those from the larger Navajo reservation and about 80 from the Ramah Navajo reservation.

== Schools ==
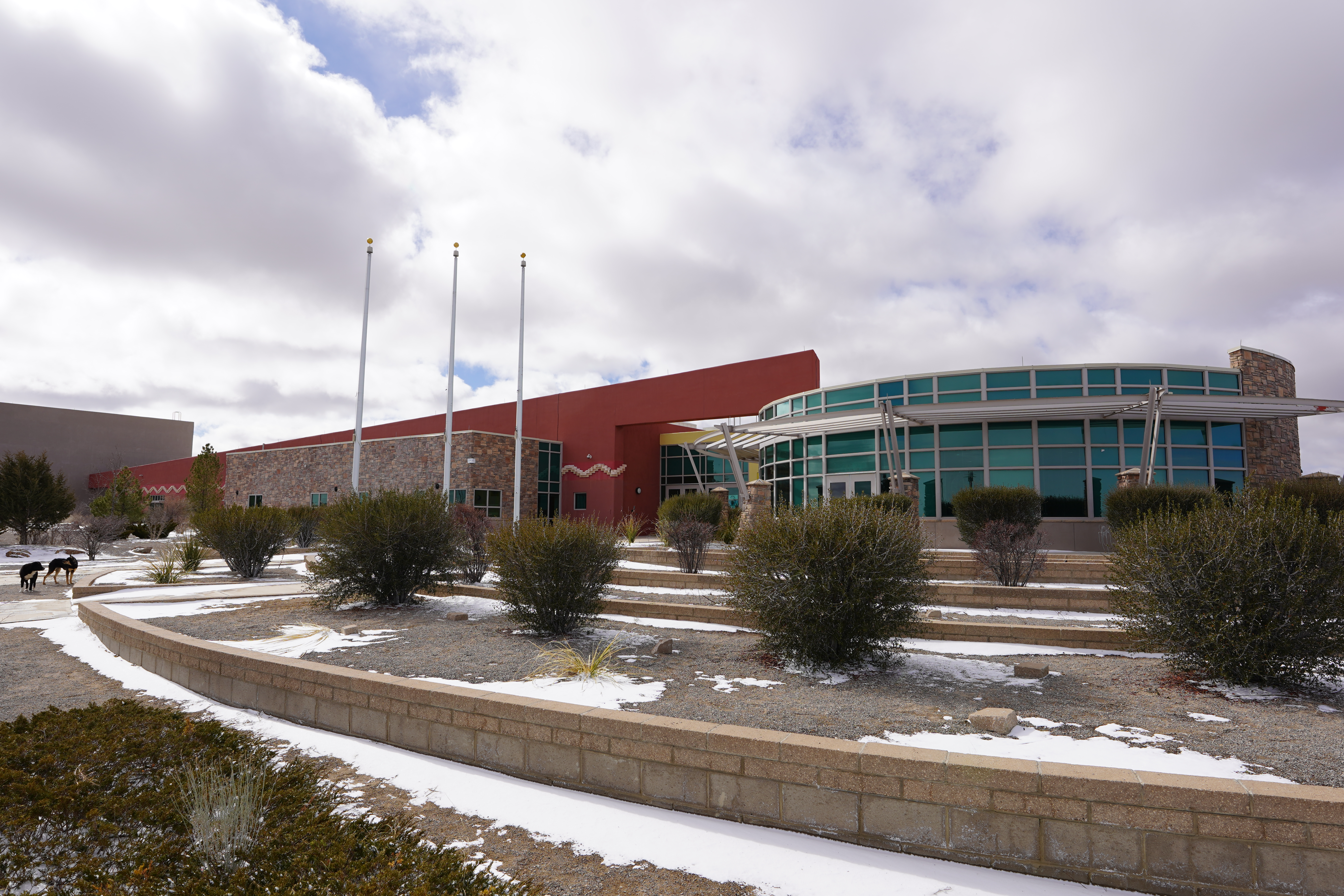
Tsé Yi’ Gai High School

=== Middle and high schools ===
- Ramah Middle/High School, Ramah

=== High schools ===
- Crownpoint High School, Crownpoint
- Gallup High School, Gallup
- Miyamura High School, Gallup
- Navajo Pine High School, Navajo
- Thoreau High School, Thoreau
- Tohatchi High School, Tohatchi
- Tsé Yi’ Gai High School, near Pueblo Pintado CDP

=== Middle schools ===
- Chief Manuelito Middle School, Gallup
- Crownpoint Middle School, Crownpoint
- Gallup Middle School, Gallup
- John F. Kennedy Middle School, Gallup
- Navajo Middle School, Navajo
- Thoreau Middle School, Thoreau
- Tohatchi Middle School, Tohatchi

=== Elementary schools ===
- Chee Dodge Elementary School
- Crownpoint Elementary School
- Del Norte Elementary School
- Indian Hills Elementary School
- Jefferson Elementary School
- Lincoln Elementary School
- Catherine A. Miller Elementary School
- Navajo Elementary School
- Ramah Elementary School
  - This school serves the Ramah Navajo Indian Reservation as part of the intercounty agreement. In 1954 a dormitory opened in Ramah, which allowed the majority of residents of the reservation to attend public schools close to their residences. In 1995 the combined enrollment of this school and the secondary school in Ramah was fewer than 400.
- Red Rock Elementary School
- Rocky View Elementary School
- Roosevelt Elementary School
- David Skeet Elementary School
- Stagecoach Elementary School
- Thoreau Elementary School
- Tobe Turpen Elementary School
- Tohatchi Elementary School
- Twin Lakes Elementary School

=== Former schools ===
- Zuni High School - In 1980 it became a part of the Zuni School District

== Transportation ==
In Summer 1994 the Ramah tribal government and the governments of Cibola County and McKinley County agreed to have two bus stops on the Ramah Navajo reservation, with one at the chapter house and another at a point to the south; this was approved by Alan Morgan, the New Mexico State Superintendent of Education. Area parents disliked the new bus stops, saying they had hazards and that they lacked the necessary space. Morgan approved establishing the bus stops deeper into the reservation, adjacent to the tribal Pine Hill Schools and at the housing complex, and these stops began operation in December 1994. In January 1995 the Ramah Navajo chapter and the associated Ramah Navajo School Board, which operates Pine Hill Schools, sued the New Mexico Public Education Department and the Gallup McKinley County Schools arguing that the defendants breached the tribe's sovereignty by allowing the school district to extend school bus services further into the tribal grounds and therefore taking students who would have attended Pine Hill Schools and violating the previous agreement between the tribe and the counties.
