= Chaco River =

Chaco River is a river tributary to the San Juan River in San Juan County, New Mexico. Its mouth lies at an elevation of 4,918 feet (1,499 meters). Its source is located at an elevation of 6,050 feet (1,840 meters) at 36°05′10″N 108°00′30″W, its confluence with Chaco Wash and Escavado Wash just northwest of the mouth of Chaco Canyon.

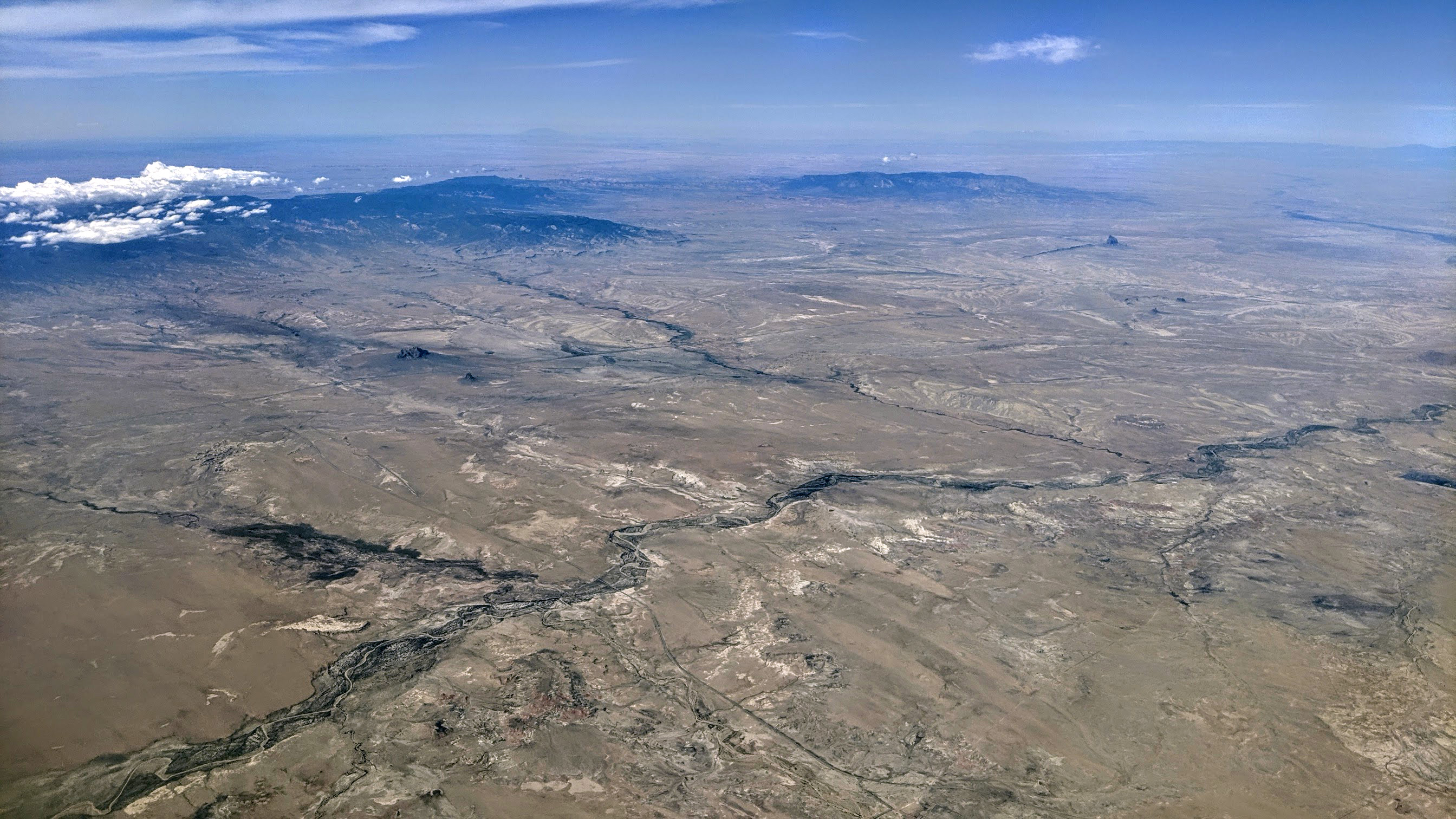
Aerial view of the Chaco River in northwest New Mexico, with tributaries Captain Tom Wash (left, below center) and Sanostee Wash (above center) and its tributary Tocito Wash (left center). In the background are the Carrizo Mountains in Arizona (right of center) and Chuska Mountains on the border (left of center). The San Juan River near Shiprock, New Mexico, is visible at upper right.
