= Cabezon Peak =

Volcanic plug in New Mexico, US

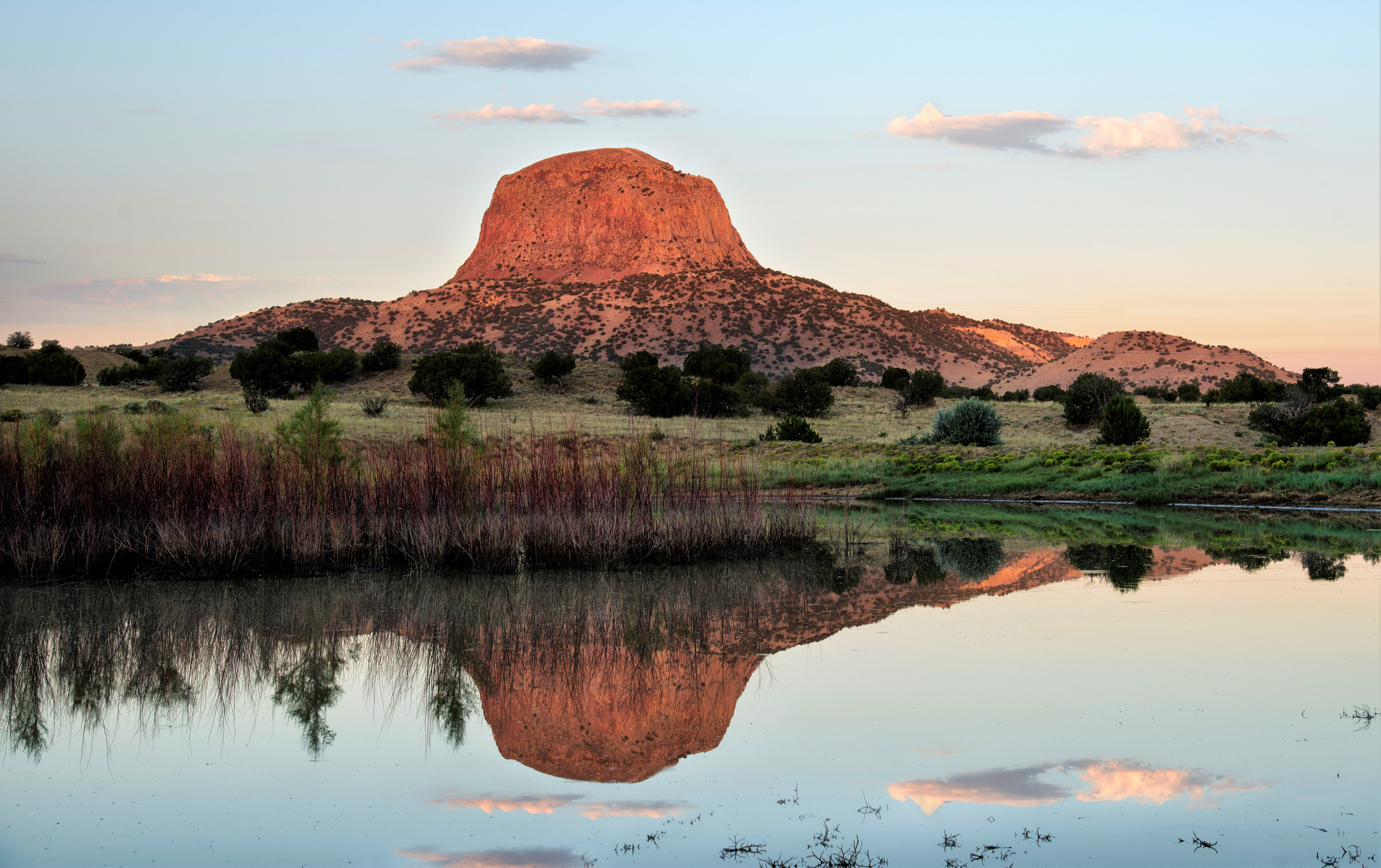
- Cabezon Peak at sunrise

Highest point
- Elevation: 7,785 ft (2,373 m)
- Prominence: 1,508 ft (460 m)
- Parent peak: Pt 9114
- Isolation: 10.35 mi (16.66 km)
- Coordinates: 35°35′58″N 107°05′45″W

Geography
- Location within New Mexico Location within the United States
- Location: Sandoval County, New Mexico, United States
- Parent range: Colorado Plateau
- Topo map: USGS Cabezon Peak

Geology
- Rock type: basalt

Climbing
- Easiest route: class 3+ scrambling

Cabezon Peak is a large volcanic plug that is a prominent feature in northwestern New Mexico. It rises to 7,785 feet (2,373 meters) in elevation, and nearly 2,000 feet above the floor of the Rio Puerco Valley. Cabezon Peak is two miles south of the old ghost town of Cabezon and the Rio Puerco. This volcanic neck is formed of basalt and is part of the Mount Taylor volcanic field. A volcanic neck or plug is formed when magma from an existing volcano solidifies in the pipe or neck and the surrounding sediment is eroded away. Marine Cretaceous rocks of the Mancos Shale and Point Lookout Sandstone are exposed around the base of Cabezon Peak.

Cabezon means “big head” in Spanish. This stems from a Navajo myth which holds that it is the head of the giant Ye’i-tsoh after being slain by the twins Nayenezgani and To’badzistsini. The first geologist to study Cabezon Peak was likely Clarence E. Dutton, who also photographed the peak in 1884–1885. Further studies were carried out by Douglas Wilson Johnson in 1907 and C.B. Hunt in 1938. All identified the peak as an exhumed volcanic neck.

Mesa Prieta is south of Cabezon Peak.

== Geology ==
Cabezon Peak is the solidified core of a volcano that erupted 2.658 ± 0.032 million years ago, based on argon-argon dating. The eruption at this volcano likely began with lava fountains from the vent, which built up a scoria cone. Lava later ponded in the interior of the cone, solidifying into a massive plug. Erosion then stripped away the less resistant scoria, leaving the highly resistant plug visible today.

The visible plug is nearly cylindrical in shape; it is approximately 0.5 kilometers (0.3 mi) across at its base, and tapers to 0.15 kilometers (0.1 mi). The plug is composed mostly of basalt columns, about 0.5 to 2.5 meters (1.6 to 8.2 ft) in diameter, that are vertical in the upper part of the plug but splay outwards at its base. The topmost part of the plug is scoria that remains from the original cone.

The lava erupted at Cabezon Peak was alkaline basalt in composition; that is, a lava relatively low in silica, and moderately enriched in alkali metals. The basalt that solidified from this lava contains visible crystals (phenocrysts) of olivine, clinopyroxene, plagioclase feldspar, and magnetite in a very fine-grained matrix. The origin of the alkaline basalt is uncertain. It may have formed in the upper mantle where hot rock crept upwards beneath the Rio Grande rift.

The basalt of Cabezon Peak contains a small number of xenoliths, fragments of solid rock that were entrained in the magma from the upper mantle or lower crust.

== Gallery ==
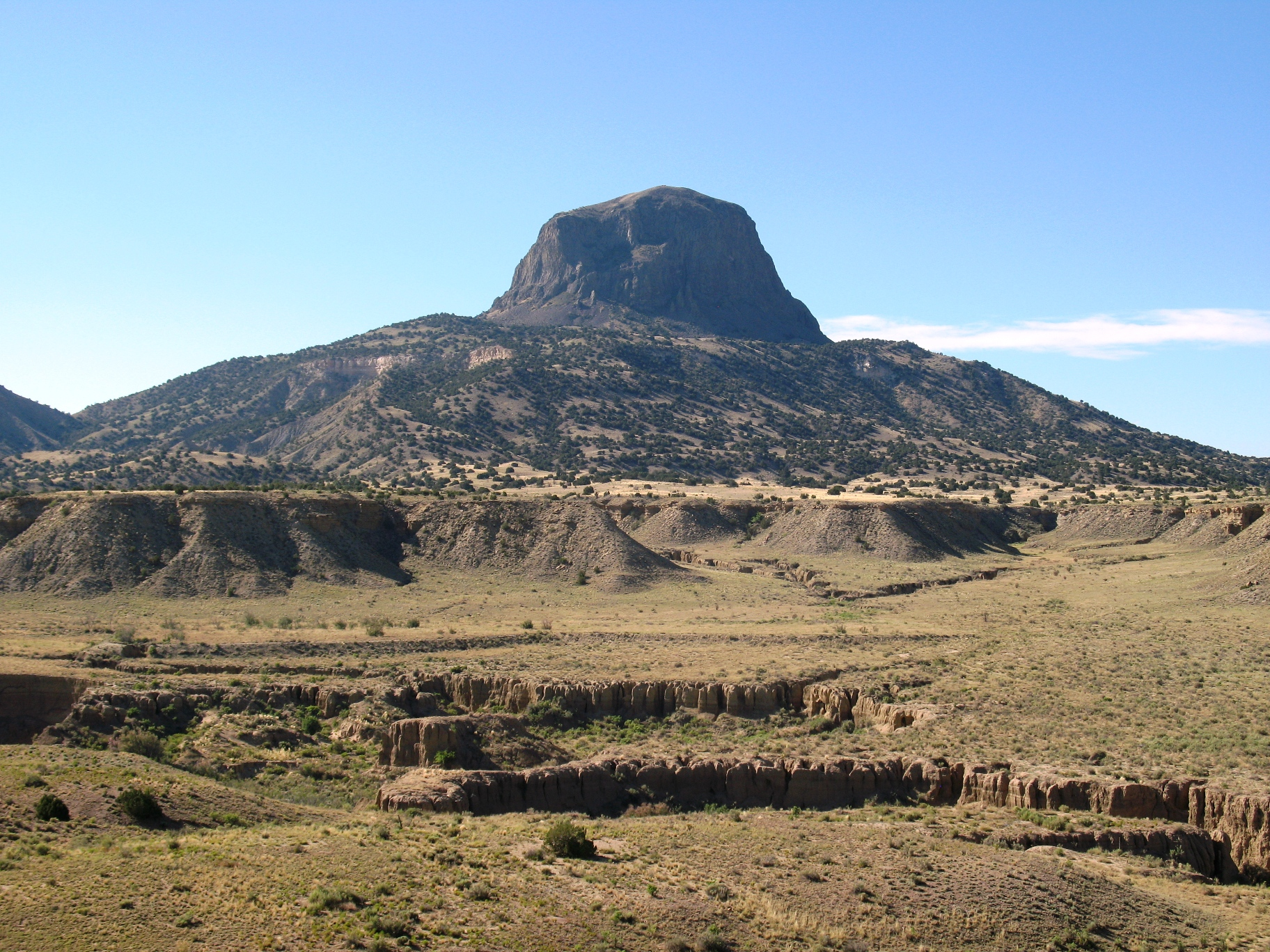
Cabezon Peak is a volcanic plug located near the "ghost town" of Cabezon, NM

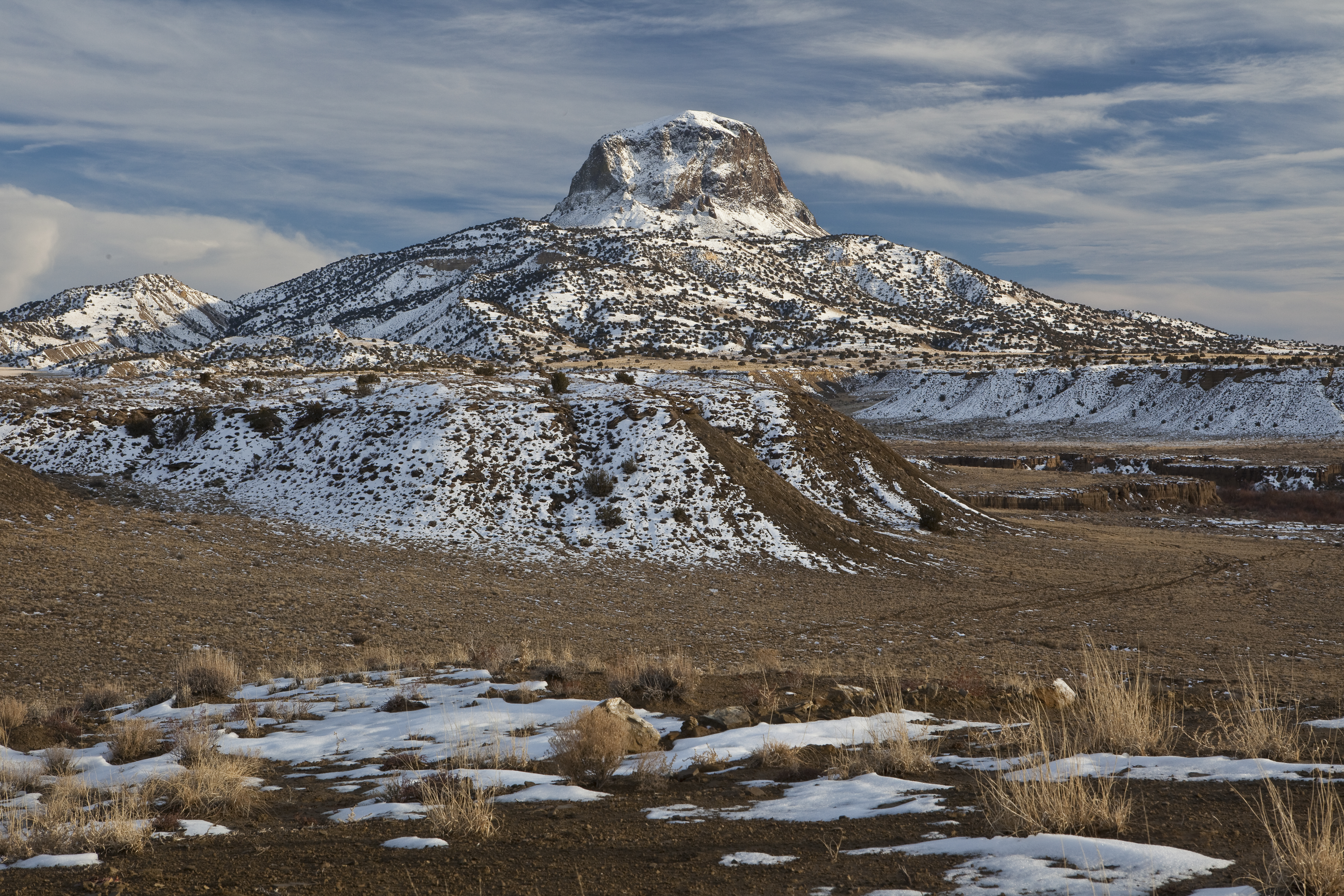
Cabezon Peak in northwestern New Mexico

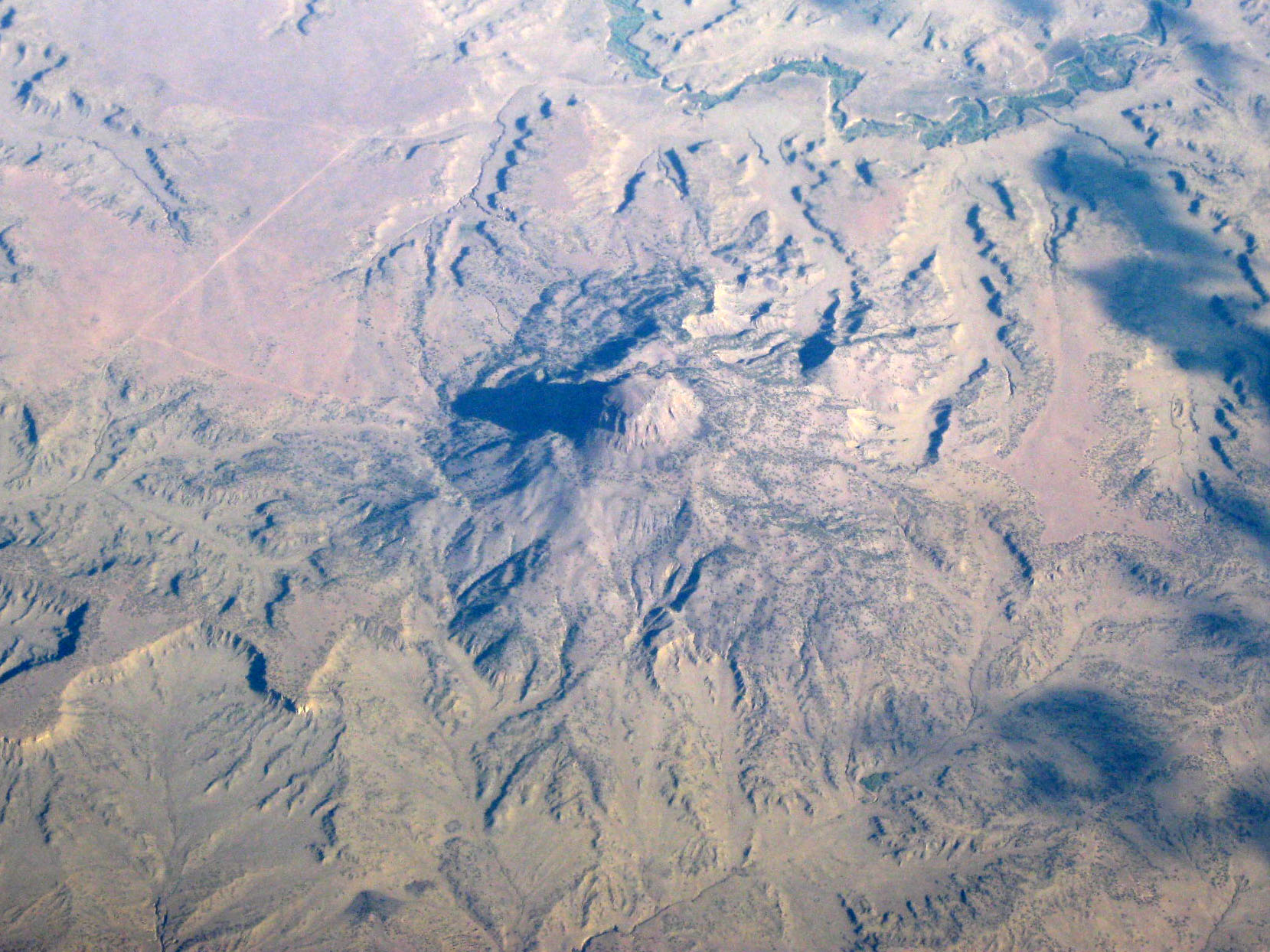
Oblique air photo of Cabezon Peak, facing north

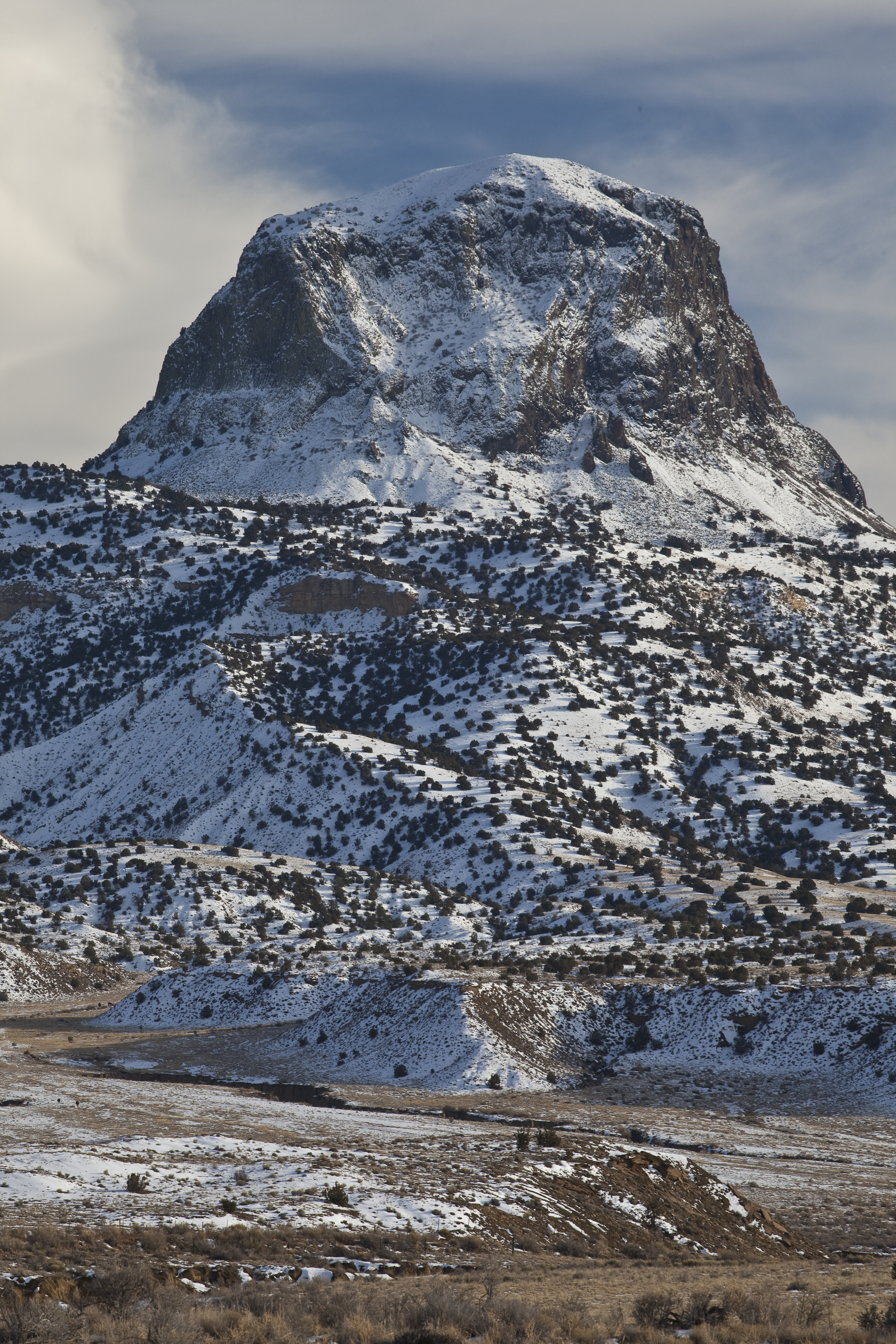
Winter scene

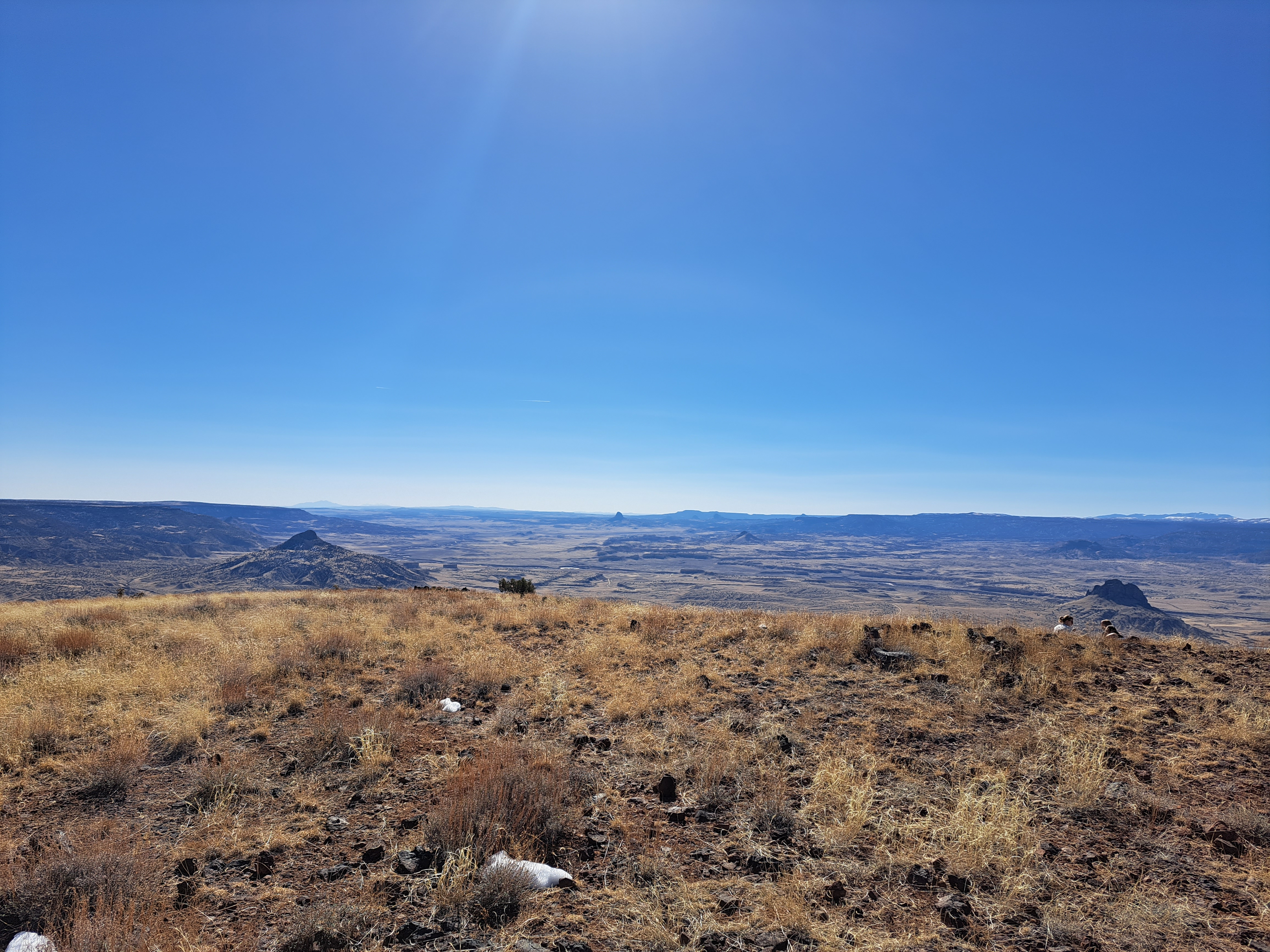
The view from the top of Cabezon Peak looking south. On the far left Mount Taylor's north side can be seen.

== See also ==
- Devils Tower
- Elephant Butte
- Shiprock
