= San Rafael, New Mexico =

San Rafael
- Census-designated place
- Location in New Mexico
- Coordinates: 35°06′23″N 107°52′20″W
- Country: United States
- State: New Mexico
- County: Cibola

Area
  - Total: 15.75 sq mi (40.79 km^{2})
  - Land: 15.75 sq mi (40.79 km^{2})
  - Water: 0 sq mi (0.00 km^{2})
- Elevation: 6,510 ft (1,980 m)

Population (2020)
  - Total: 1,164
  - Density: 73.9/sq mi (28.54/km^{2})
- Time zone: UTC-7 (Mountain (MST))
  - Summer (DST): UTC-6 (MDT)
- FIPS code: 35-69875
- GNIS feature ID: 2584213

San Rafael is a census-designated place (CDP) in Cibola County, New Mexico, United States. As of the 2020 census, San Rafael had a population of 1,164. Also known as "Bikyaya" or "El Gallo", it lies at an elevation of 6,470 feet (1,970 m) above sea level and is located in north-central Cibola County at (35.1125386, -107.8825580). New Mexico State Road 53 passes through the community, leading north 3 miles (5 km) to Interstate 40 and 5 miles (8 km) to the center of Grants, the county seat.

An 1850 U.S. Army map shows a Hay Camp near San Rafael. Fort Wingate was established (moved from Seboyeta, New Mexico) by Lt. Colonel J. Francisco Chavez, 1st New Mexico Infantry under the orders of General Edward Canby in 1862. It was located near a large spring and designed to house four companies of troops. Colonel Kit Carson and four companies of New Mexico Volunteers used this fort. Carson was ordered by General Carleton to round up first the Mescalero Apache, then the Navajo and send them to Bosque Redondo. San Rafael was a stop on the Navajo's journey to and from Fort Sumner. In 1868 the garrison and name of the fort was transferred to the former site of Fort Lyon, near Gallup.

== Demographics ==
Historical population
Census	Pop.	Note	%±
2020	1,164		—
U.S. Decennial Census

== See also ==
- Silvester Mirabal
