= La Mesita Blanca =

Landform in Bernalillo County, New Mexico

- Location within New Mexico Location within the United States

Highest point
- Elevation: 5,988 ft (1,825 m)
- Prominence: 151 ft (46 m)
- Parent peak: 6390
- Isolation: 4.96 mi (7.98 km) to 6390
- Coordinates: 35°10′56″N 107°2′27″W

Geography
- Location: Bernalillo County, New Mexico, United States
- Parent range: San Mateo Mountains
- Topo map: USGS Herrera

Geology
- Rock age(s): Late Cretaceous, 80 to 85 Million years ago
- Rock type: Hosta Tongue sandstone

La Mesita Blanca is a mountain in the Tohajiilee Indian Reservation in Bernalillo County, New Mexico. It is 24 miles (38 km) west of Albuquerque, New Mexico.
