= Wingate High School =

Wingate High School may refer to:

- George W. Wingate High School in Brooklyn, New York City
- Wingate High School (New Mexico) in Wingate, New Mexico
