= Seboyeta, New Mexico =

- Census-designated place
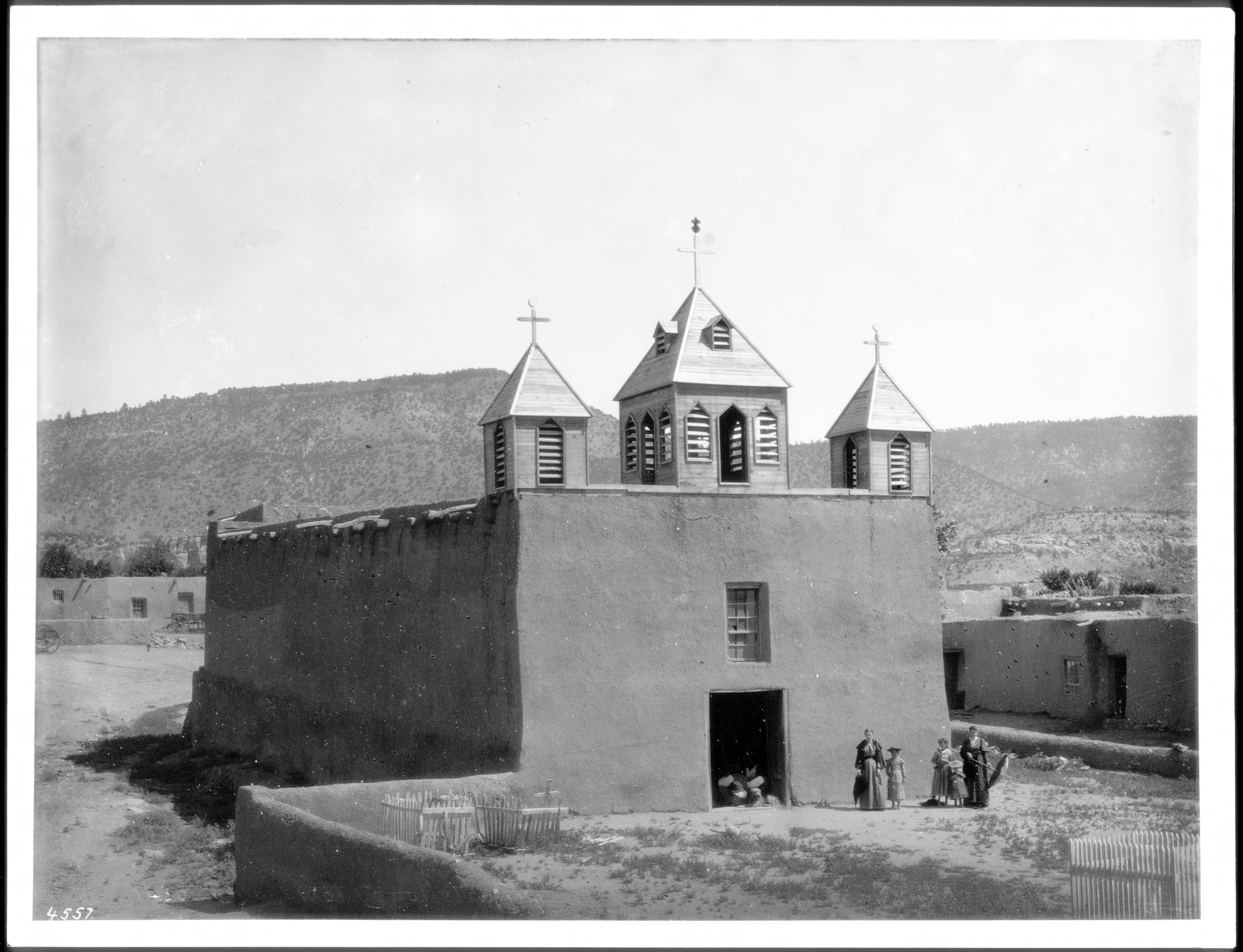
- Exterior view of a church at Cibolleta, New Mexico, ca.1898

- Location within New Mexico
- Coordinates: 35°11′54″N 107°22′48″W
- Country: United States
- State: New Mexico
- County: Cibola

Area
  - Total: 2.67 sq mi (6.92 km^{2})
  - Land: 2.67 sq mi (6.92 km^{2})
  - Water: 0 sq mi (0.00 km^{2})
- Elevation: 6,362 ft (1,939 m)

Population (2020)
  - Total: 164
  - Density: 61/sq mi (23.7/km^{2})
- Time zone: UTC-7 (Mountain (MST))
  - Summer (DST): UTC-6 (MDT)
- ZIP code: 87014
- Area code: 505
- GNIS feature ID: 2584216

Seboyeta is a census-designated place in Cibola County, New Mexico, United States. As of the 2020 census, Seboyeta had a population of 164. Seboyeta had a post office from February 5, 1885, to January 7, 1995.

== History ==
In 1746, Padre Juan Menchero persuaded several hundred members of the Navajo Tribe to settle at Cebolleta. A mission was established for the purpose of converting the Navajo to Christianity. The community was formally established in 1749, under the name of "Cebolleta", a word meaning "little onion." It was named for the nearby Cebolleta Mountains, now called the San Mateo Mountains. But in 1750, the Navajo rejected the efforts and returned to their own lands.

On January 23, 1800, Governor Fernando Chacon granted a request by Francisco Aragon and twenty-nine others who wished to settle at Cebolleta and establish a town there. Chacon ordered Alcalde Jose Manuel Aragon of the Pueblo of Laguna to formally transfer the approved area to the receivers of the grant. As New Mexico was still under the control of Spain, and the Alcalde was appointed by the Spanish king, this order had the force of a royal command.

The colonists had been granted an area bordered “On the north, by the San Mateo Mountains; on the east, by the Zia Road and Pedro Padilla Valley; on the south, by the Mesa del Bagilan, which adjoins the Paquate ranch; and on the west, by the San Mateo Mountains.”

In 1801, the Navajo returned, believing the land to be theirs, and forced the colonists to leave. They fled to Chihuahua, in New Spain.

In 1803, the colonists were forced by the Spanish government to return to Cebolleta and ordered to remain there under penalty of death. They had accepted a grant from the Spanish king and no legal right to abandon it.

In 1805, the Navajo again attacked the settlement. This second attack would have ended in a massacre, but the Laguna Tribe came to the defense of the colonists. In gratitude, the inhabitants of the Town of Cebolleta, recognized the Laguna claim to certain lands to the south, known as the Rancho de Paquate, which the colonists had previously considered their own. To smooth the negotiations, Laguna agreed to purchase the houses, barns, and other improvements the colonists had made to these lands. In 1826, after control of New Mexico had passed from Spain to the newly formed nation of Mexico, Governor Antonio Narbona formally approved the agreement with a grant to the Laguna Pueblo.

In 1846, control of New Mexico passed to the United States. A military post was established at Cebolleta in 1849, but in 1862, General Edward Canby ordered this post moved to San Rafael, New Mexico, in 1862 and it was renamed Fort Wingate.

In 1859, the heirs of the original Spanish land grant, petitioned the United States government, in the person of Surveyor General William Pelham to recognize their claims to the land. Pelham agreed to the terms of the petition, but formal recognition required the approval of Congress. The outbreak of the Civil War delayed these proceedings until 1869. A formal patent, approving the claim, was issued on January 27, 1882.

In 1885, a post office was established for the town. There were already several places using the name "Cebolleta" in the Post Office directory, so the variant spelling of Seboyeta was used instead.

== Demographics ==
Historical population
| Census | Pop. | Note | %± |
|---|---|---|---|
| 2020 | 164 | | — |
U.S. Decennial Census
