= Mount Taylor (New Mexico) =

Stratovolcano in the San Mateo Mountains, North America

- Tsoodził (in Navajo)
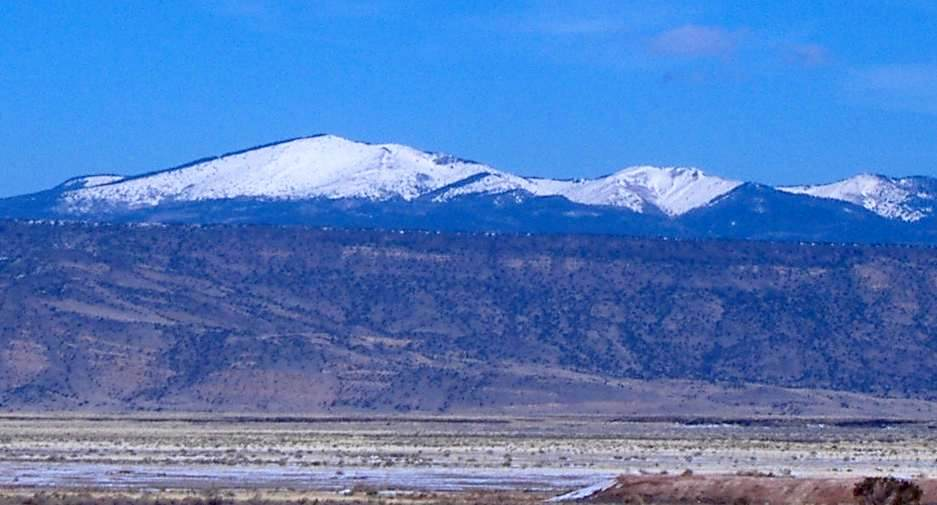

Highest point
- Elevation: 11,305 ft (3,446 m) NAVD 88
- Prominence: 4,094 ft (1,248 m)
- Coordinates: 35°14′19″N 107°36′31″W

Geography
- Location within New Mexico
- Location: Cibola County, New Mexico, U.S.
- Parent range: San Mateo Mountains
- Topo map: USGS Mount Taylor

Geology
- Mountain type: Stratovolcano

Climbing
- Easiest route: Hike

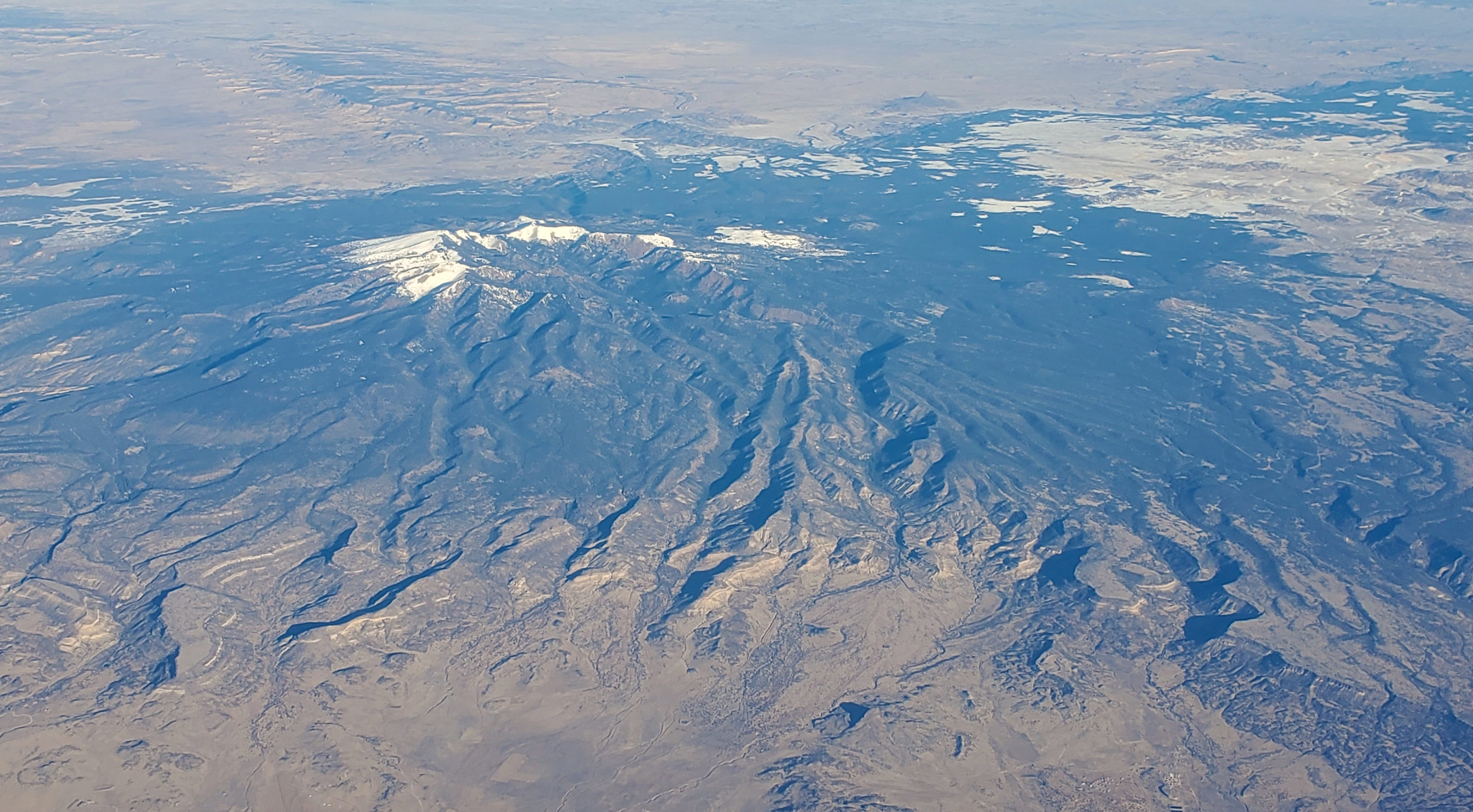
Mount Taylor, seen from the South

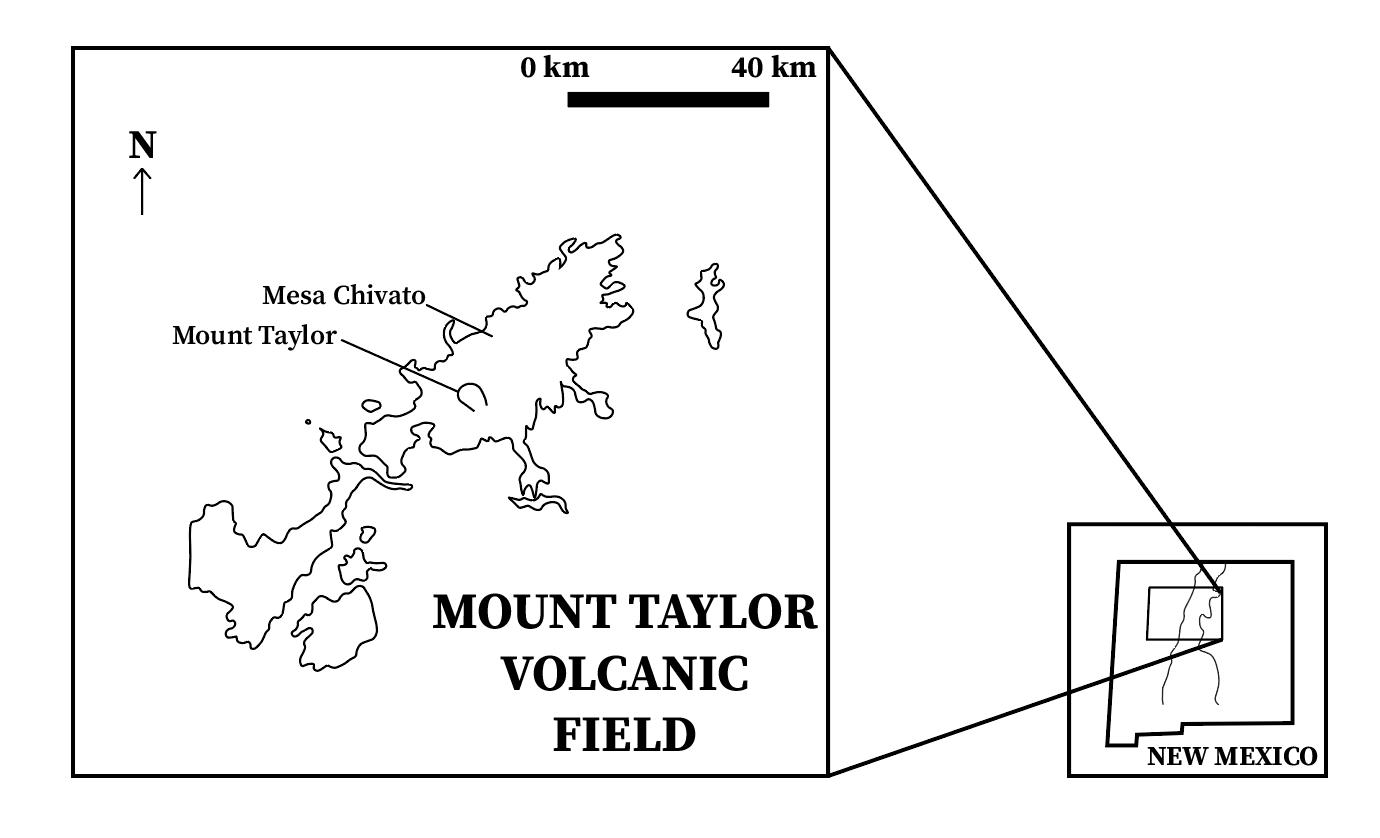
Map of Mount Taylor Volcanic Field in central New Mexico (modified from Crumpler, 1980).

Mount Taylor (Navajo: Tsoodził, Navajo pronunciation: [tsʰòːtsɪ̀ɬ] means "The Great Mountain") is a dormant stratovolcano in northwest New Mexico, northeast of the town of Grants. It is the high point of the San Mateo Mountains (Note: There are two small ranges in New Mexico called the San Mateo Mountains; this is the northern one. The other range is near the Plains of San Agustin.) and the highest point in the Cibola National Forest.

It was renamed in 1849 for then president Zachary Taylor. Previously, it was called Cebolleta (tender onion) by the Spaniards; the name persists as one name for the northern portion of the San Mateo Mountains, a large mesa. The Navajo, for whom the mountain is sacred, still call it Turquoise Mountain (Tsoodził).

Mount Taylor is largely forested with some meadows, rising above the desert below. The mountain is heavily eroded to the east. Its slopes were an important source of lumber for neighboring pueblos.

== Mount Taylor volcanic field ==
Mount Taylor volcano is a prominent volcano that is part of a larger volcanic field that trends to the northeast. The Mount Taylor volcanic field includes Mesa Chivato to the northeast and Grants Ridge to the southwest. The Mount Taylor volcanic field is composed primarily of silica-poor (mafic) lava (with 80% by volume), most of which is trachybasalt. Basalt and basanite are present in much smaller amounts. The field straddles the extensional transition zone between the Colorado Plateau and the Rio Grande rift. The largest volcanic plug in the volcanic field is Cabezon Peak, which rises nearly 2,000 feet above the surrounding plain.

== Native American traditions ==
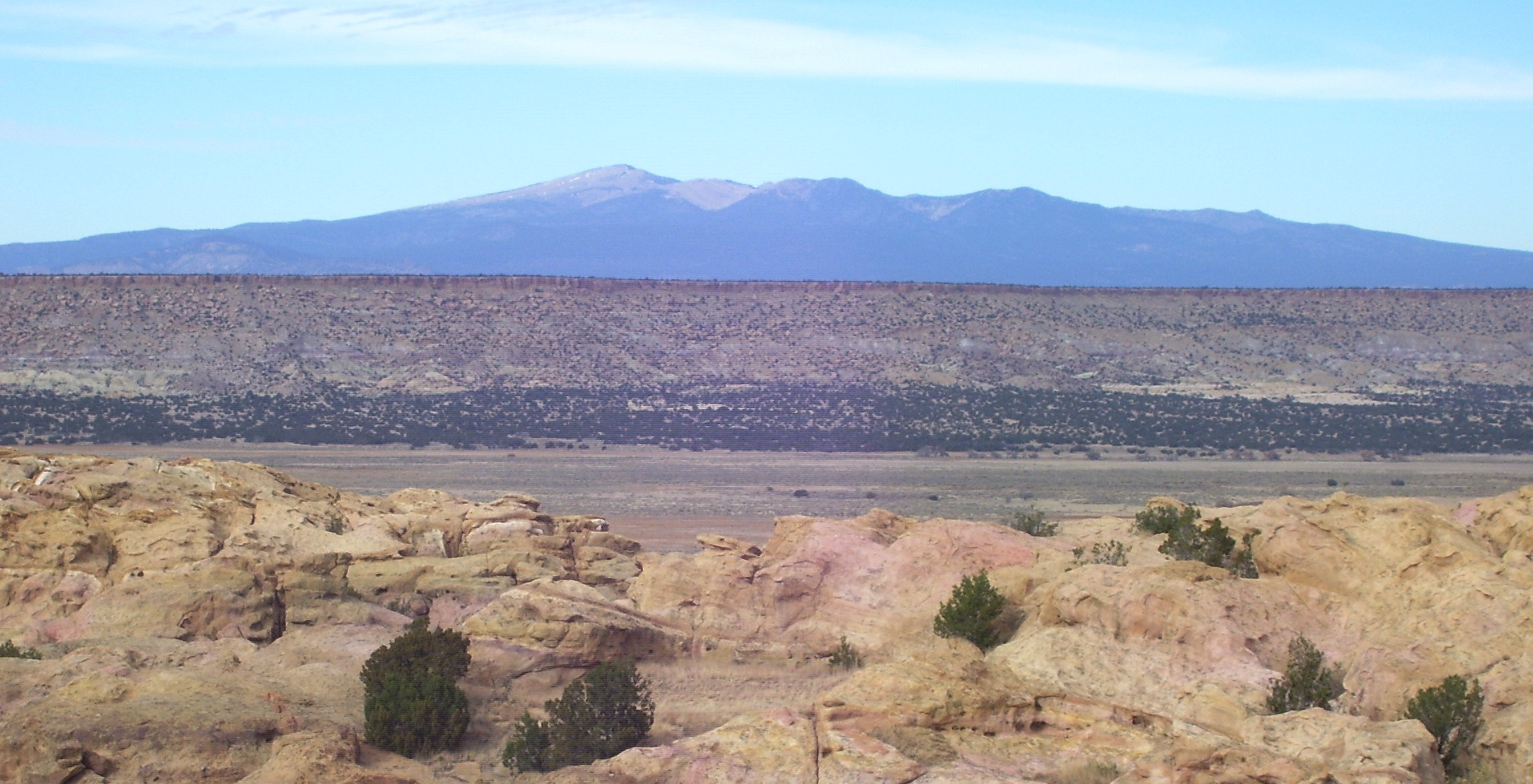
A view of Mount Taylor to the north from the west end of the Sky City of Acoma Pueblo.

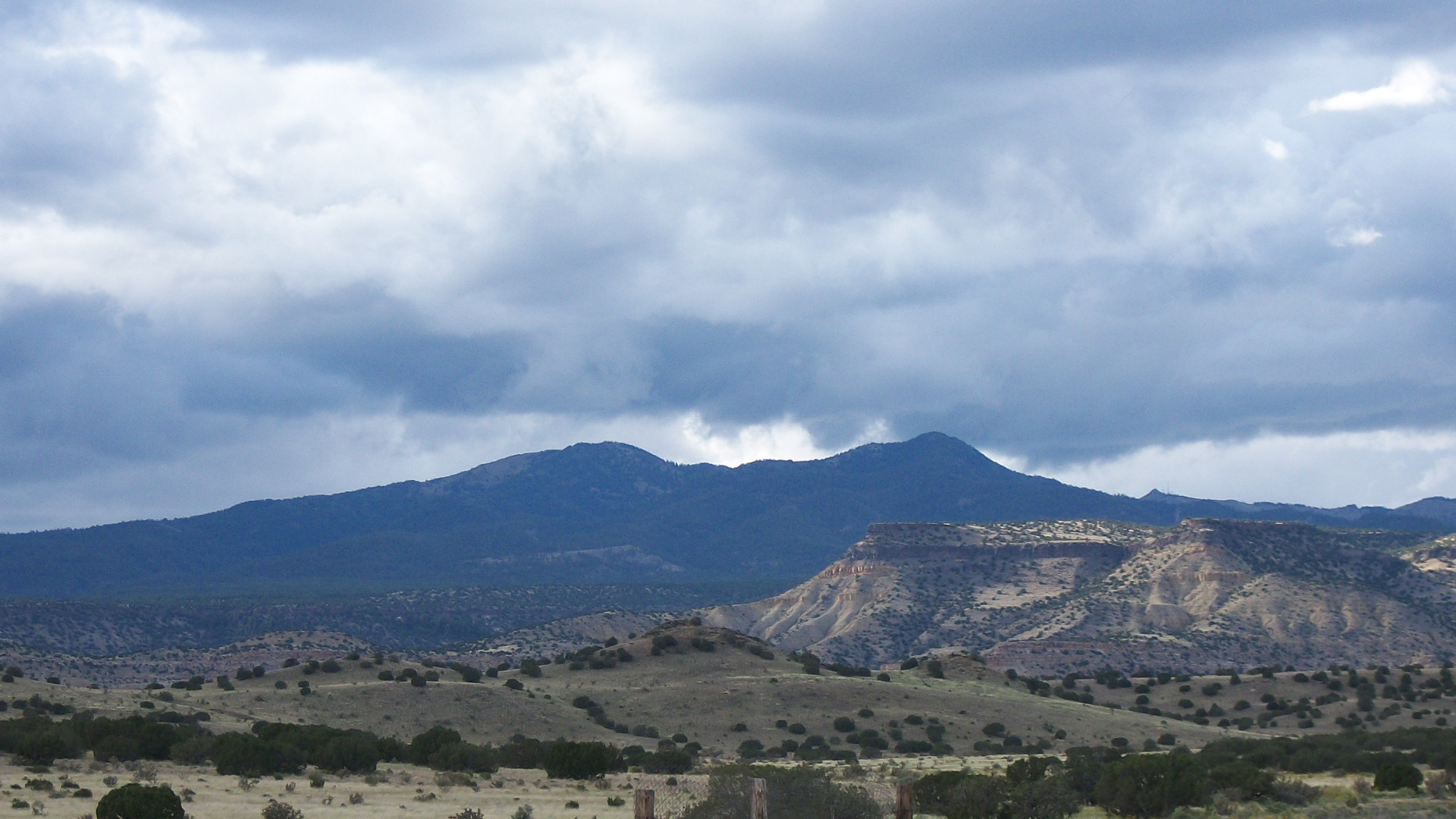
A southwest view of Mount Taylor, as seen from the village of Encinal, NM.

Mount Taylor is sacred to the pueblos of Acoma, Laguna and Zuni, and the Hopi and Navajo people. Mount Taylor is Tsoodził, the blue bead mountain, sometimes translated as Turquoise Mountain, one of the four sacred mountains marking the cardinal directions and the boundaries of the Dinetah, the traditional Navajo homeland. Mount Taylor marks the southern boundary, and is associated with the direction south and the color blue; it is gendered female. In Navajo mythology, First Man created the sacred mountains from soil from the Fourth World, together with sacred matter, as replicas of mountains from that world. He fastened Mount Taylor to the earth with a stone knife. The supernatural beings Black God, Turquoise Boy, and Turquoise Girl are said to reside on the mountain. According to Robert Julyan's The Place Names of New Mexico, the Navajos identify Cabezon Peak "as the head of a giant killed by the Twin War Gods" with the lava flow to the south of Grants believed to be the congealed blood of the giant.

== Topography ==
The mountain is heavily eroded to the east, exposing a large amphitheater that is approximately 5 square miles. Estimates vary about how high the mountain was at its highest. An extreme estimate places it near 4,270 meters (14,000 ft), but it is more likely the volcano was never higher than 3,800 meters (12,000 ft). The mountain is surrounded by a great volume of volcanic debris, but the debris field and the natural amphitheater in the central part of the mountain are attributed to erosion rather than a late stage explosion similar to Valles Caldera, Mount St. Helens or the San Francisco Peaks. Downcutting has been great enough to expose Cretaceous sedimentary rocks at the core of the cone.

== Geology ==
The Mount Taylor Volcanic Field is a series of Upper Cenozoic volcanic beds that overlies Cretaceous sedimentary rocks in central New Mexico. This volcanic field is part of the Jemez Lineament, which is associated with relatively young volcanism (< 5 Mya) due to an ancient suture in the Proterozoic basement rock. The general stratigraphy of the volcanic field starts with a more intermediate (rhyolitic) lava composition and transitions to a more mafic (basaltic) composition as more eruptions occurred. The transition of this magma from alkalic to basaltic eruptions is thought to have resulted form multiple, short-lived magma chambers within Mount Taylor, instead of one long-lived chamber that experienced fractional crystallization.

=== Volcanology ===
Mount Taylor was active during the Pliocene to Pleistocene, and is surrounded by a field of smaller inactive volcanoes. Potassium-argon (K-Ar) dating showed that a large majority of the volcanic activity from Mount Taylor occurred between 4.3 and 1.5 million years ago, with the peak of the volcanism occurring between 3.0 mya and 2.5 mya. Mount Taylor volcano was the leading source of volcanism in this area for this time period, aside from some local basalt eruptions.

The trend of Mount Taylor eruptions can be divided into four sequences or phases. The first phase, from 3.74 to 2.93 million years ago, was mostly basanite with some alkali basalt which formed mesa caps. This was accompanied by small volumes of more silicic volcanism, producing trachyte, trachydacite, and rhyolite tuffs, domes, and plugs. The second phase, from 2.88 to 2.78 million years ago, built up much of the stratovolcano and consisted of trachyandesite, trachydacite, and dacite. The uppermost flows of this phase are mostly a rock previously identified as plagioclase basalt, but now reclassified from basaltic trachyandesite to trachyandesite. The third phase, from 2.75 to 2.52 million years ago, completed the construction of the stratovolcano and formed the flows capping its peak. These are mostly trachyandesite and trachydacite with very little tuff or pyroclastic rock. The fourth and final pulse was mostly flank eruptions of trachybasalt.

The alkaline nature of this lava is unique in North America and is probably associated with the Rio Grande rift, as alkaline magma is typically found in continental rifts or ocean islands, such as Hawaii.

== Climate ==
Climate data for Mount Taylor 35.2398 N, 107.6112 W, Elevation: 10,876 ft (3,315 m) (1991–2020 normals)
Month	Jan	Feb	Mar	Apr	May	Jun	Jul	Aug	Sep	Oct	Nov	Dec	Year
Mean daily maximum °F (°C)	35.4 (1.9)	36.1 (2.3)	41.3 (5.2)	47.7 (8.7)	56.8 (13.8)	68.2 (20.1)	69.5 (20.8)	67.0 (19.4)	61.9 (16.6)	53.1 (11.7)	43.1 (6.2)	35.6 (2.0)	51.3 (10.7)
Daily mean °F (°C)	24.9 (−3.9)	25.3 (−3.7)	29.8 (−1.2)	34.3 (1.3)	43.1 (6.2)	53.5 (11.9)	56.2 (13.4)	54.4 (12.4)	49.2 (9.6)	40.3 (4.6)	32.4 (0.2)	25.4 (−3.7)	39.1 (3.9)
Mean daily minimum °F (°C)	14.4 (−9.8)	14.5 (−9.7)	18.4 (−7.6)	20.9 (−6.2)	29.4 (−1.4)	38.7 (3.7)	42.8 (6.0)	41.8 (5.4)	36.5 (2.5)	27.5 (−2.5)	21.7 (−5.7)	15.3 (−9.3)	26.8 (−2.9)
Average precipitation inches (mm)	2.01 (51)	2.17 (55)	2.53 (64)	1.86 (47)	2.03 (52)	1.22 (31)	5.46 (139)	6.74 (171)	4.20 (107)	2.66 (68)	2.47 (63)	2.47 (63)	35.82 (911)
Source: PRISM Climate Group

== Recreation ==
Mount Taylor is the site of the Mount Taylor Winter Quadrathlon, an endurance event which has been held at this location for over thirty years, with the 2025 event being the 42nd. The event includes bicycling, running, cross-country skiing and snowshoeing for 44 miles from the town of Grants to the summit and back. Since 2012 there has also been a 50-kilometer running race on Mount Taylor, sponsored by the Albuquerque Roadrunners club. Competitors who complete the 50 km run in the fall and the Quadrathlon in the following winter are known as 'Doublers' and earn a special award.

== Wildlife ==
Mount Taylor and the surrounding area is home to large elk herds, mule deer, black bear, mountain lion and wild turkey. Bird species are particularly diverse in the area and include great blue heron, white-faced ibis, canvasback, common merganser, rough-legged hawk, red-tailed hawk, ferruginous hawk, sharp-shinned hawk, osprey, golden eagle, barn owl, great horned owl, kestrel, whip-poor-will, white-throated swift, western kingbird, warbling vireo, western meadowlark, house finch, swifts, swallows, prairie falcon, gray-headed junco, Steller's jay, and pinyon jay. Furthermore, the area offers excellent raptor-nesting habitat on the various cliffs that spill down into the Rio Puerco valley below.

Mount Taylor wildlife
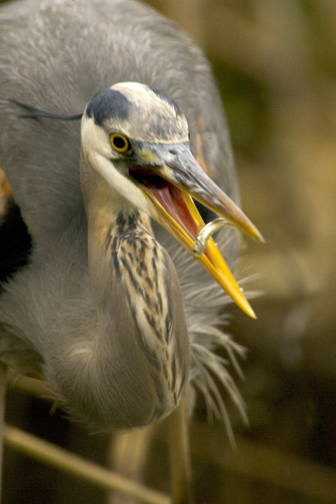
Great blue heron are found on Mount Taylor.

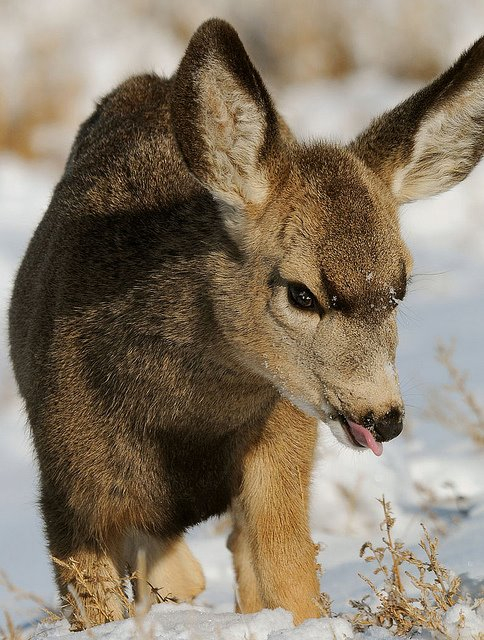
A mule deer fawn in the snow.

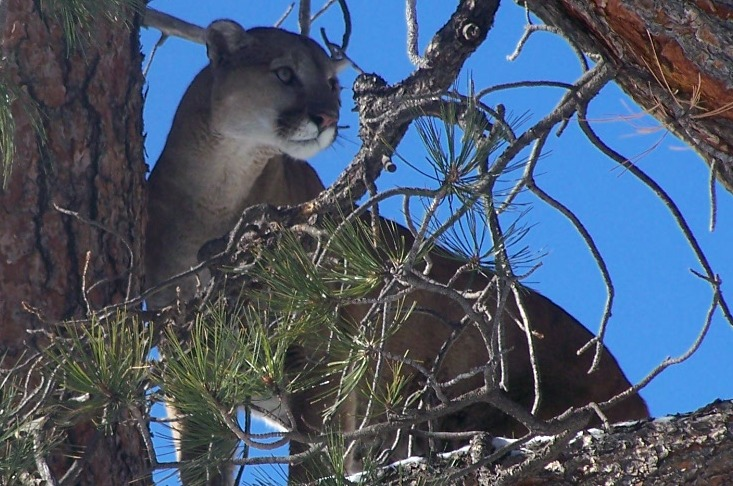
A mountain lion in a tree on Mount Taylor.

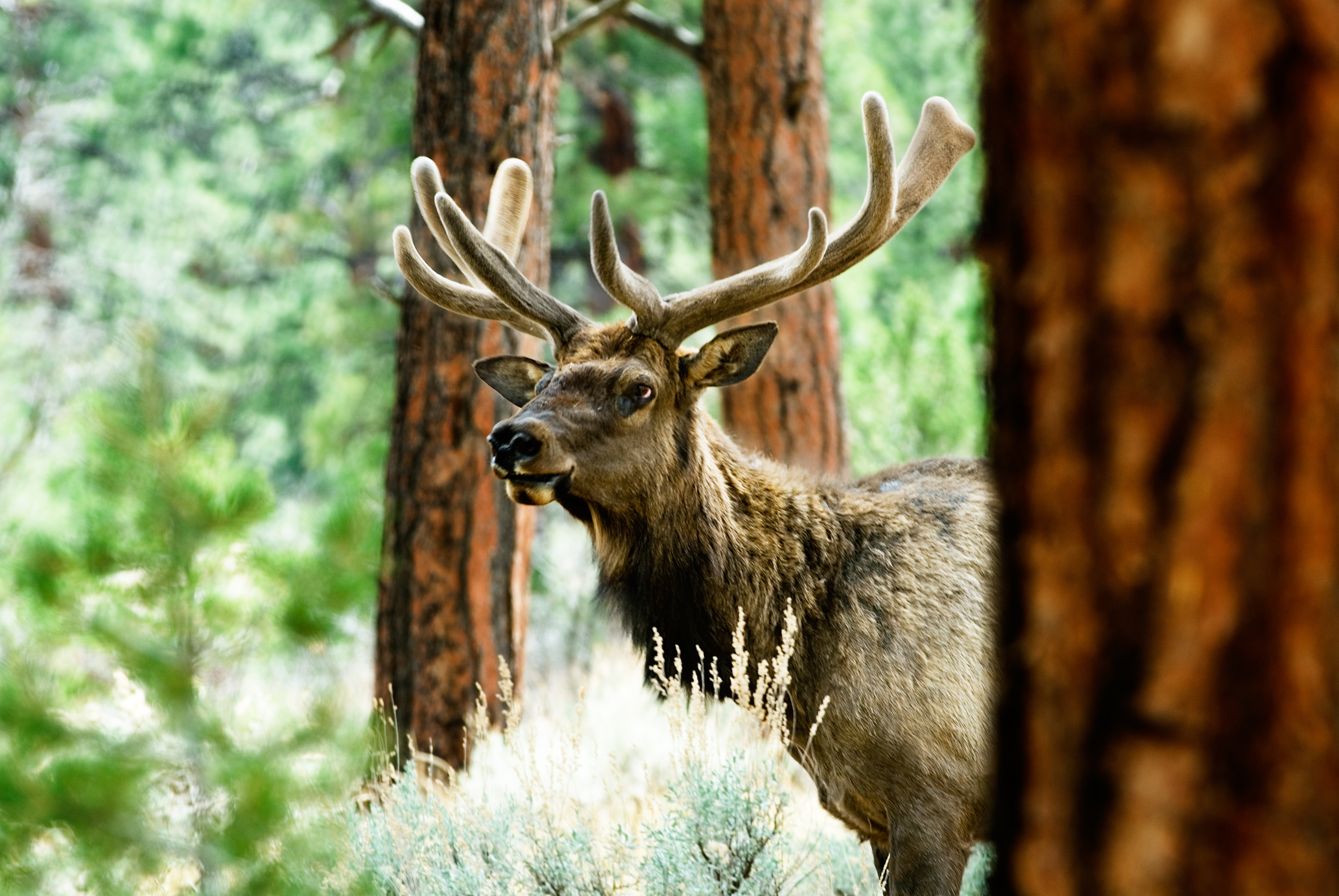
Mount Taylor is home to healthy populations of elk.

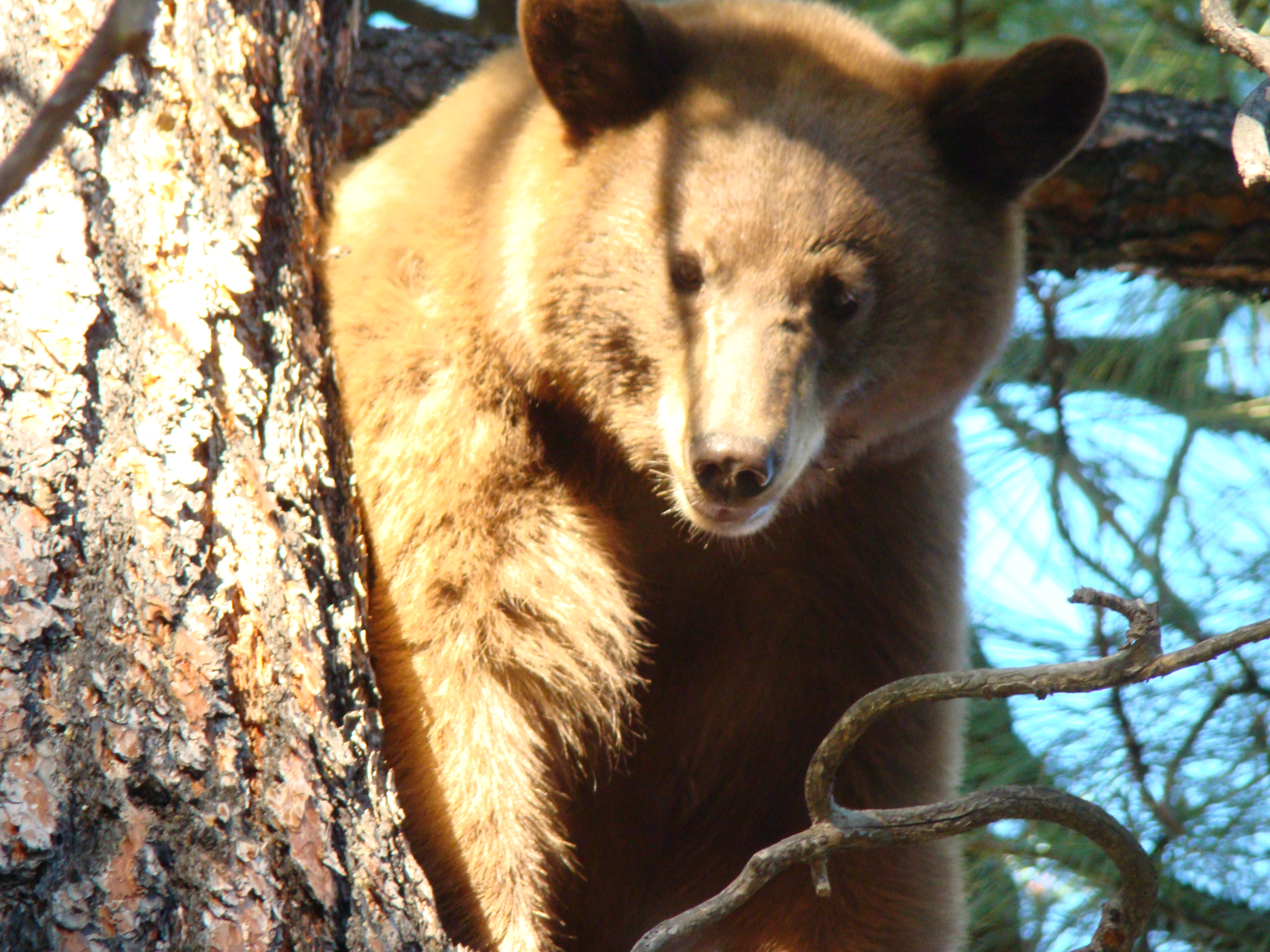
A black bear in a tree on Mount Taylor.

== Mining ==
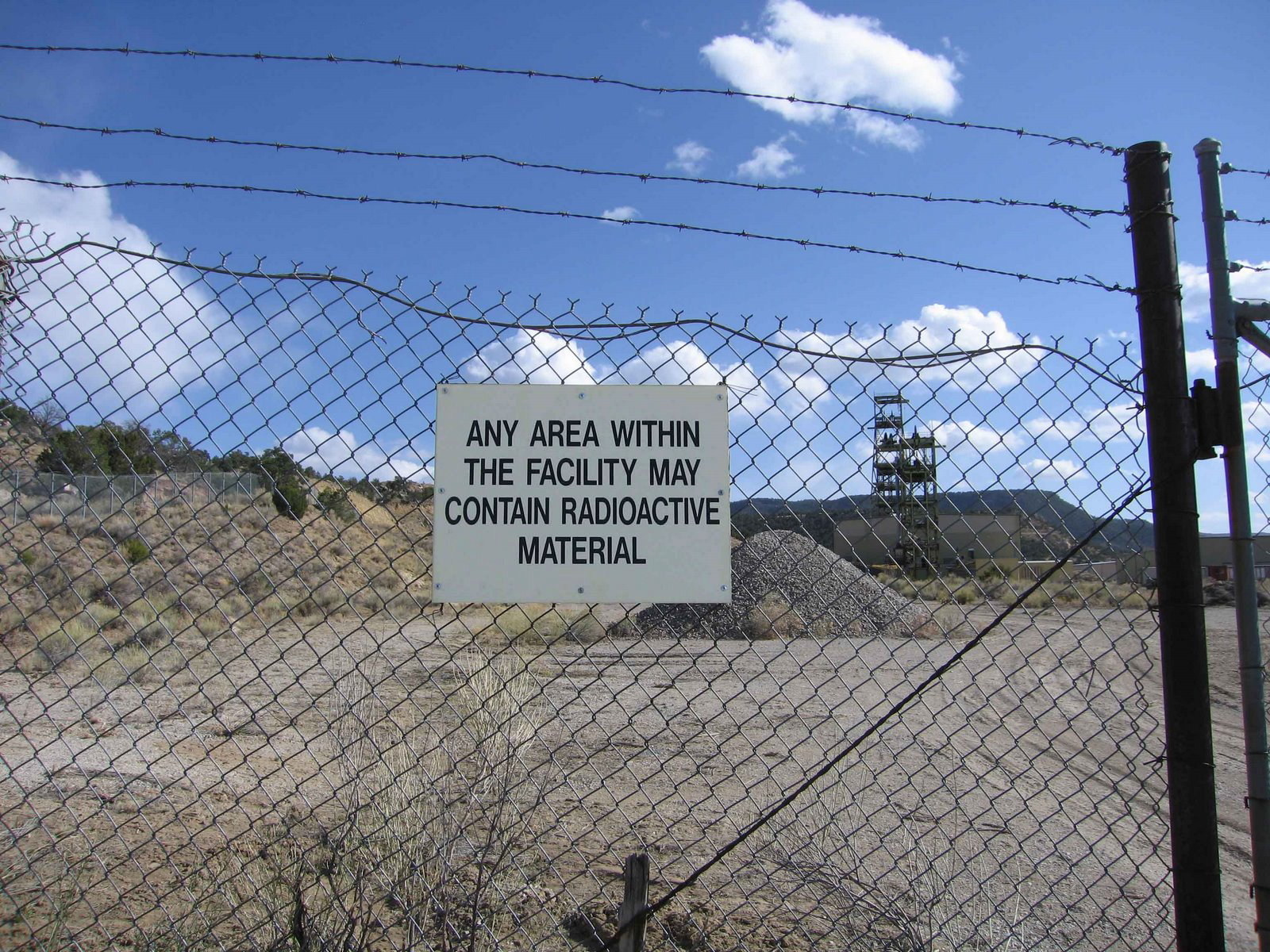
Mount Taylor uranium mine, New Mexico.

The area around Mount Taylor is very rich in a uranium-vanadium bearing mineral, and was mined extensively for it from 1951 to 1989. The hundreds of uranium mines on Pueblo lands have provided over thirteen million tons of uranium ore to the United States since 1945.

Concern has arisen regarding the impact of future mining activities on the site. In June 2008 the New Mexico Cultural Properties Review Committee voted in favor of a one-year emergency listing of more than 422,000 acres (171,000 ha) surrounding the mountain's summit on the state Register of Cultural Properties. "The Navajo Nation, the Acoma, Laguna and Zuni pueblos, and the Hopi tribe of Arizona asked the state to approve the listing for a mountain they consider sacred to protect it from an anticipated uranium mining boom, according to the nomination report." In April 2009, Mount Taylor was added to the National Trust for Historic Preservation's list of America's Most Endangered Places.

== Notable events ==
On 3 September 1929, the Transcontinental Air Transport Ford 5-AT-B Tri-Motor City of San Francisco struck Mount Taylor during a thunderstorm while on a scheduled passenger flight from Albuquerque Airport in Albuquerque, New Mexico, to Los Angeles, California, killing all eight people on board.

On 7 April 1961, B-52B (53‑0380, call sign "Ciudad Juarez") from the 95th Bombardment Wing out of Biggs AFB was accidentally shot down by the launch of an AIM-9 Sidewinder from a F-100A Super Sabre (tail number 53-1662) from the 188th Tactical Fighter Squadron, New Mexico Air National Guard fighter jet during a practice intercept. The missile struck the engine pylon on the B-52 resulting in separation of the wing. The aircraft crashed on Mount Taylor, New Mexico with three of the eight crew on board killed. An electrical fault in the firing circuit caused the inadvertent launch of the missile.

== See also ==
- Capulin Volcano National Monument
- El Malpais National Monument
- San Mateo Mountains (Cibola County, New Mexico)
