= Silvester Mirabal =

20th century New Mexico statesman

Silvestre Mirabal (1864–1939) was a farmer, stock raiser, and politician. Mirabal over the course of his life would go on to become one of the most influential ranchers and statesman in the state of New Mexico. Mirabal was widely known for his hard working demeanor and his common dress attire. Mirabal would never wear anything but work clothes out in public. According to relatives, Mirabal believed that hard work is what built empires and fancy parties kept people from hard work.

== Early life ==
Silvestre Mirabal was born to Monico Mirabal and Juana Maria Sanchez, in the Rio Puerco, New Mexico area in 1864.

== Career ==
Mirabal became a delegate to the Constitutional Convention of New Mexico. He was a United States Census Environmental chairman of the Valencia County Commission. He was also a member of the lower house of the legislature of the territory of New Mexico. Mirabal was also a sheep and cattle inspector and a United States court commissioner. He was a three time delegate to the National Irrigation Congress.

On April 29, 1959, Mirabal was nominated to the prestigious National Cowboy Hall of Fame in Oklahoma City, Oklahoma. His nomination came as no surprise as he exhibited numerous qualities as a rancher and businessman that helped improve the agricultural community in the state of New Mexico. Mirabal's information card in Oklahoma names many of his accomplishments that propelled him into a nomination. As a young man, Mirabal rode the range for the Acoma Land and Cattle Company. Later he acquired a vast amount of land from the tribe. Later, he supplied hay, timber, and supplies to Fort Wingate (also known as Fort Fantelroy).

Later, after becoming a notable rancher, Mirabal shipped wool to Albuquerque, New Mexico and Trinidad, Colorado. This venture along with his mercantile business made him one of the most notable stockmen. In 1900 Mirabal was known as the richest man in New Mexico.

During the next few years at the onset of the 20th century, Mirabal became involved in politics and the banking business. Mirabal served as the first president of The Citizens Bank. He also became a board member of The First National Bank of Albuquerque from its beginning until his death in 1939. During this period, starting in the late 19th century to 1912 Mirabal was nominated as a delegate to the legislative assembly and also to the Constitutional Convention. These nominations allowed Mirabal to become very influential in the by-laws that established New Mexico as a state from a territory in 1912.

== Later life and family ==
Mirabal died at his ranch home located in San Rafael, New Mexico. Mirabal's youngest son, Monico, survived him and went on to continue his father's work. He built a large ranch in northern New Mexico.
