= Mesa Prieta =

Mesa in New Mexico, United States

- Mesa
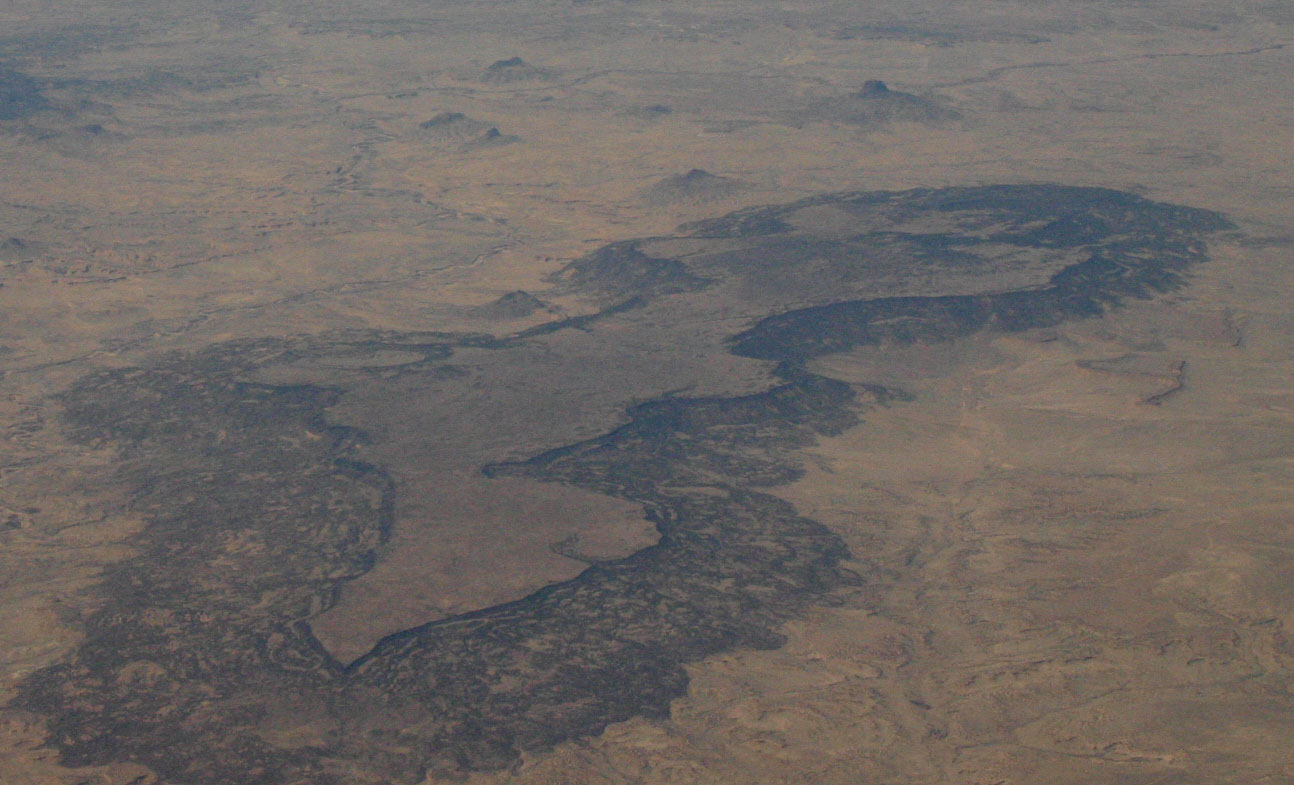

- Coordinates: 35.473951°N 107.053356°W
- Location: 25 km west of San Ysidro, NM
- Formed by: basaltic lava flow during the Pliocene

Mesa Prieta is a mesa in Sandoval County New Mexico. The mesa was formed by a basaltic lava flow during the Pliocene. The sedimentary rocks include the Cretaceous Dakota Sandstone, Mancos Shale, and Gallup Sandstone.

The Rio Puerco flows south on the west side of the mesa. The Ojito Wilderness is to the east of the mesa, and Cabezon Peak is to the north.
