= New Mexico State Road 400 =

State highway in New Mexico, United States

State Road 400
- NM 400 highlighted in red

Route information
- Maintained by NMDOT
- Length: 10.620 mi (17.091 km)

Major junctions
- South end: CR 50 in McGaffey
- I-40 in Wingate
- North end: NM 118 in Wingate

Location
- Country: United States
- State: New Mexico
- Counties: McKinley

Highway system
- New Mexico State Highway System; Interstate; US; State; Scenic
← NM 399	→ NM 401

State Road 400 (NM 400) is a 10.620-mile-long (17.091 km) state highway in the US state of New Mexico. NM 400's southern terminus is at the end of state maintenance where it continues as County Route 50 in McGaffey, and the northern terminus is at NM 118 in Wingate.

== Major intersections ==
The entire route is in McKinley County.

Location	mi	km	Destinations	Notes
Wingate	0.000	0.000	NM 118	Northern terminus
Wingate	0.001	0.0016	I-40 east	I-40 exit 33, eastbound on/ off ramps only
McGaffey	10.620	17.091	CR 50	Southern terminus, continues as CR 50
1.000 mi = 1.609 km; 1.000 km = 0.621 mi: Incomplete access
