= McGaffey, New Mexico =

- Census-designated place
- Location within New Mexico Location within the United States
- Coordinates: 35°22′30″N 108°31′15″W
- Country: United States
- State: New Mexico
- County: McKinley

Area
  - Total: 1.78 sq mi (4.6 km^{2})
  - Land: 1.75 sq mi (4.5 km^{2})
  - Water: 0.03 sq mi (0.078 km^{2})
- Elevation: 7,796 ft (2,376 m)

Population (2020)
  - Total: 0
- Time zone: UTC-7 (Mountain (MST))
  - Summer (DST): UTC-6 (MDT)
- ZIP Code: 87316 (Fort Wingate)
- Area code: 505
- FIPS code: 35-45890
- GNIS feature ID: 2806724

McGaffey is an unincorporated community and census-designated place (CDP) in McKinley County, New Mexico, United States. The population was 0 as of the 2020 census. Despite there being no permanent residents in McGaffey, the community has about a dozen cabins with seasonal occupants. There is an active quarry about 2 miles south of McGaffey, and there are a few cattle ranches nearby. Additionally, McGaffey is a popular recreation spot, with the nearby McGaffey and Quaking Aspen campgrounds, fishing at McGaffey Lake, and numerous hiking trails.

== Geography ==
The community is in the southern part of the county, at the south end of New Mexico State Road 400, which leads north 11 miles (18 km) to Interstate 40 near Fort Wingate. McGaffey is within Cibola National Forest, and the Forest Service's McGaffey Campground is just south of the center of the community.

According to the U.S. Census Bureau, the McGaffey CDP has an area of 1.78 square miles (4.61 km^{2}), of which 0.03 square miles (0.08 km^{2}), or 1.46%, are water. McGaffey Lake is a small reservoir in the northeast corner of the CDP. The lake drains south toward Tampico Draw and the Rio Nutria, a south-flowing tributary of the Rio Pescado and the Zuni River, part of the Little Colorado River watershed.

== Demographics ==
Historical population
Census	Pop.	Note	%±
2020	0		—
U.S. Decennial Census

McGaffey was first listed as a CDP prior to the 2020 census and a population of zero was reported.

== Education ==
It is in Gallup-McKinley County Public Schools.

== Climate ==
Climate data for McGaffey 5 SE, New Mexico, 1991–2020 normals, 1949-2020 extremes: 8000ft (2438m)
Month	Jan	Feb	Mar	Apr	May	Jun	Jul	Aug	Sep	Oct	Nov	Dec	Year
Record high °F (°C)	69 (21)	66 (19)	72 (22)	80 (27)	88 (31)	98 (37)	99 (37)	95 (35)	89 (32)	85 (29)	73 (23)	66 (19)	99 (37)
Mean maximum °F (°C)	54.1 (12.3)	55.7 (13.2)	62.8 (17.1)	70.4 (21.3)	78.2 (25.7)	87.8 (31.0)	90.3 (32.4)	86.1 (30.1)	82.2 (27.9)	75.6 (24.2)	65.2 (18.4)	56.5 (13.6)	91.1 (32.8)
Mean daily maximum °F (°C)	43.5 (6.4)	46.1 (7.8)	52.9 (11.6)	59.6 (15.3)	69.7 (20.9)	81.9 (27.7)	84.0 (28.9)	81.1 (27.3)	76.5 (24.7)	66.8 (19.3)	53.7 (12.1)	44.3 (6.8)	63.3 (17.4)
Daily mean °F (°C)	27.7 (−2.4)	30.6 (−0.8)	37.2 (2.9)	43.3 (6.3)	51.8 (11.0)	61.7 (16.5)	66.6 (19.2)	64.8 (18.2)	59.2 (15.1)	48.3 (9.1)	36.8 (2.7)	28.1 (−2.2)	46.3 (8.0)
Mean daily minimum °F (°C)	11.8 (−11.2)	15.0 (−9.4)	21.6 (−5.8)	27.0 (−2.8)	33.9 (1.1)	41.5 (5.3)	49.2 (9.6)	48.4 (9.1)	41.8 (5.4)	29.7 (−1.3)	19.9 (−6.7)	11.9 (−11.2)	29.3 (−1.5)
Mean minimum °F (°C)	−10.8 (−23.8)	−7.3 (−21.8)	−1.3 (−18.5)	7.9 (−13.4)	18.5 (−7.5)	27.0 (−2.8)	38.5 (3.6)	38.4 (3.6)	25.4 (−3.7)	12.1 (−11.1)	−3.1 (−19.5)	−12.2 (−24.6)	−15.6 (−26.4)
Record low °F (°C)	−32 (−36)	−25 (−32)	−19 (−28)	−3 (−19)	10 (−12)	15 (−9)	28 (−2)	27 (−3)	17 (−8)	0 (−18)	−21 (−29)	−30 (−34)	−32 (−36)
Average precipitation inches (mm)	1.79 (45)	1.46 (37)	1.51 (38)	1.13 (29)	0.98 (25)	0.55 (14)	2.82 (72)	3.14 (80)	1.64 (42)	1.43 (36)	1.63 (41)	1.61 (41)	19.69 (500)
Average snowfall inches (cm)	9.00 (22.9)	8.70 (22.1)	6.60 (16.8)	2.40 (6.1)	0.20 (0.51)	0.00 (0.00)	0.00 (0.00)	0.00 (0.00)	0.00 (0.00)	2.50 (6.4)	2.60 (6.6)	10.10 (25.7)	42.1 (107.11)
Source 1: NOAA
Source 2: XMACIS2 (records & 1981-2010 monthly max/mins)
