= Rio Puerco (Rio Grande tributary) =

River in New Mexico, United States

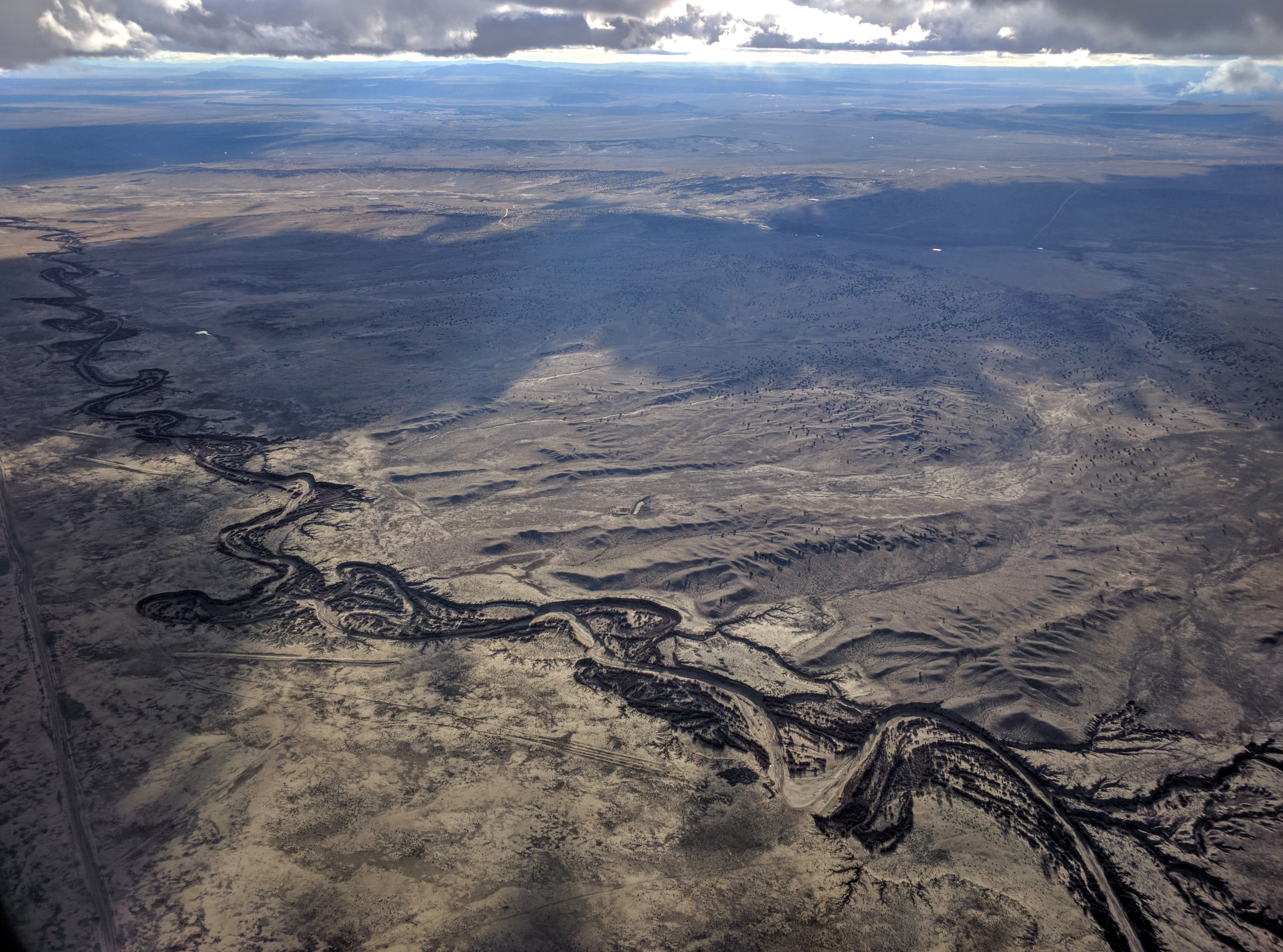
- The Rio Puerco where it crosses the eastern edge of the Tohajiilee Indian Reservation, just west of Albuquerque's West Mesa, Petroglyph National Monument, and Double Eagle II Airport

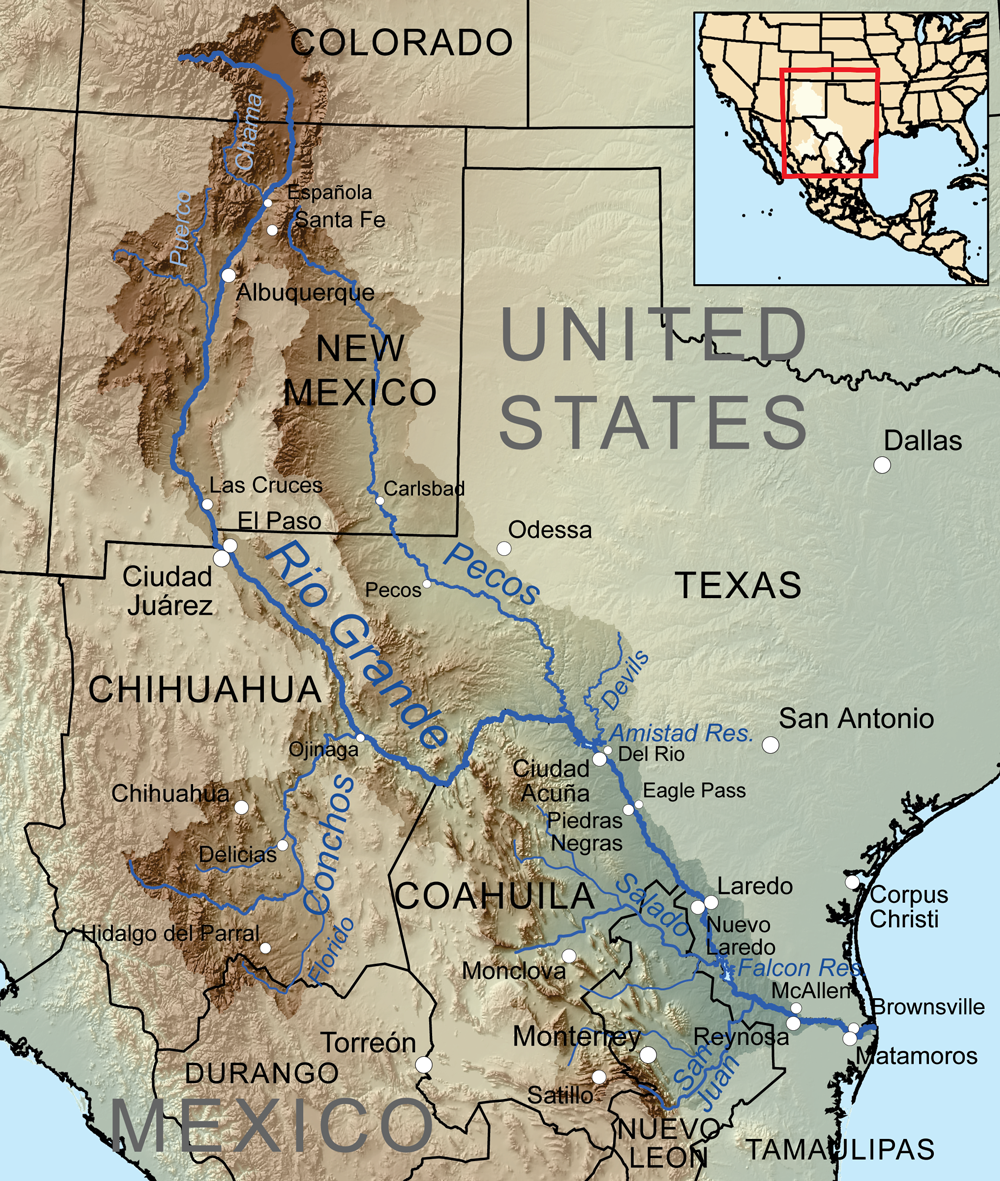
- Map of the Rio Grande watershed, showing the Rio Puerco joining the Rio Grande near Albuquerque.

Location
- Country: United States
- State: New Mexico
- County: Socorro, Valencia, Bernalillo, Sandoval, Rio Arriba

Physical characteristics
- Source: San Pedro Peaks
  - location: Nacimiento Mountains
  - coordinates: 36°7′28″N 106°49′53″W
  - elevation: 10,500 ft (3,200 m)
- Mouth: Rio Grande
  - coordinates: 34°22′23″N 106°50′33″W
  - elevation: 4,711 ft (1,436 m)
- Length: 230 mi (370 km)
- Basin size: 7,350 sq mi (19,000 km^{2})
- Discharge
  - location: USGS gage 08353000, 3 miles above mouth
  - average: 39.5 cu ft/s (1.12 m^{3}/s)
  - minimum: 0 cu ft/s (0 m^{3}/s)
  - maximum: 35,000 cu ft/s (990 m^{3}/s)

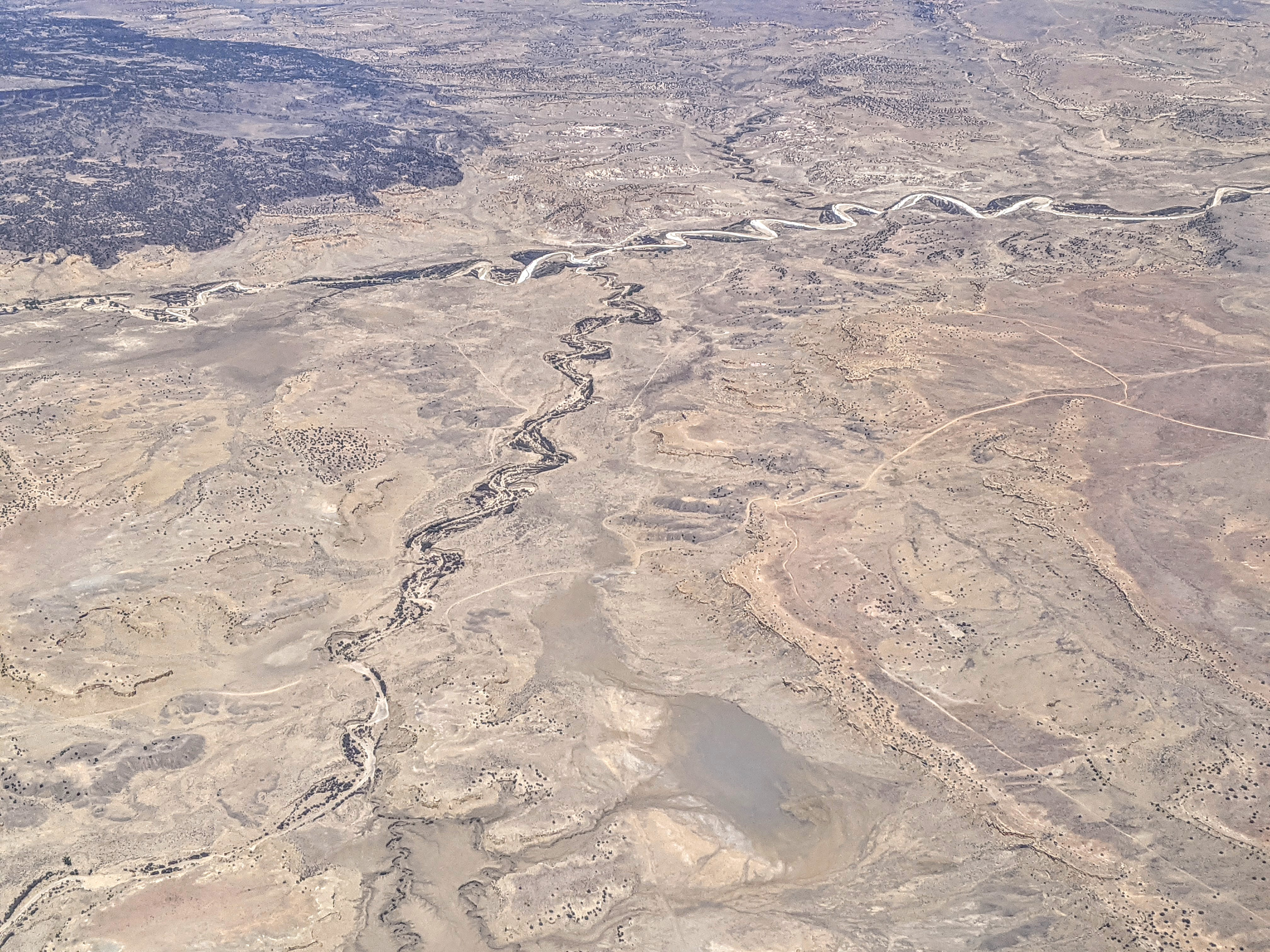
Salado Creek (Salt Creek) and its confluence with the Rio Puerco near Prieta Mesa, which is visible in the upper left

The Rio Puerco is a tributary of the Rio Grande in the U.S. state of New Mexico. From its source on the west side of the Nacimiento Mountains, it flows about 230 miles (370 km), generally south to join the Rio Grande about 20 miles (32 km) south of Belen and about 50 miles (80 km) south of Albuquerque. Its drainage basin is about 7,350 square miles (19,000 km^{2}) large, of which probably about 1,130 square miles (2,900 km^{2}) are noncontributing.

The Rio Puerco is ephemeral, with no streamflow for part of the year. Its discharge averages 39.5 cubic feet per second (1.12 m^{3}/s). The maximum officially recorded discharge was 5,980 cubic feet per second (169 m^{3}/s), in 1941. The greatest flood since about 1880 occurred on September 23, 1929, with an estimated discharge of 35,000 cubic feet per second (990 m^{3}/s). Another flood, on August 12, 1929, reached an estimated 30,600 cubic feet per second (870 m^{3}/s).

== Name ==
Although Rio Puerco means River of Pigs in Spanish, this usage in the southwestern United States is better translated as Muddy River. In Keres, the river is known as Áræmtsa Chéna, in Towa as Pʼâ Tyushyulonų, and in Navajo as Naasísitee.

== Course ==
The Rio Puerco arises in the San Pedro Peaks area of the Nacimiento Mountains, in the San Pedro Parks Wilderness area of the Santa Fe National Forest. It flows generally south and southwest, leaving the mountains and national forest near the village of Cuba. From there the river flows generally south. It flows along the west side of the Jemez Indian Reservation. Arroyo Chico joins from the west, between Mesa San Luis and Mesa Chivato. The Rio Puerco continues south, passing west of Mesa Prieta, then through the Laguna Indian Reservation and the Tohajiilee Indian Reservation. Near the Bernalillo–Valencia county line and the Isleta Indian Reservation the river is joined by the Rio San Jose, which flows from the west near Grants through the Laguna Reservation. The Rio Puerco continues south through the Albuquerque Basin to the Rio Grande about 20 miles (32 km) south of Belen and about 50 miles (80 km) south of Albuquerque.

== History ==
The Rio Puerco Valley is notable for once hosting a significant numbers of ancestral Puebloan (descendants of the Basketmaker II) people. Upper Rio Puerco sites are associated with both Gallina and Chacoan traditions. Chacoan migrants settled in the region during the Pueblo II period following collapse of the Chacoan civilization, before being joined by Cibola and Mesa Verde peoples during the Pueblo III period.

In the 1860s the US Army moved strongly against Native American raiding west of the Rio Grande. By the late 1860s the Navajo were no longer a chronic threat and the Apache had been pushed back into the high mountains. The Hispanos living along the Rio Grande were able to move west with some security for the first time. Hispano colonists from Albuquerque and Bernalillo quickly occupied every irrigable patch of land along the Rio Puerco. By the middle of the 20th century, decades of overgrazing and flash flooding had rendered the Rio Puerco country virtually uninhabitable and it was abandoned.

== Sediment and erosion ==
As it carries high levels of sediment, the Rio Puerco is a major source of suspended particulate matter. Overgrazing has made the Rio Puerco Basin of central New Mexico one of the most eroded river basins of the western United States and has increased the high sediment content of the river. The USGS collects suspended-sediment samples at its stream gage three miles (5 km) above the river's mouth. A maximum daily mean of sediment concentration of 417,000 mg/L was recorded on July 25, 2008. The maximum recorded daily sediment load was 2,240,000 tons, recorded on August 7, 1957.

== See also ==
- List of rivers of New Mexico
- List of tributaries of the Rio Grande
- Silvester Mirabal
