= Wingate High School (New Mexico) =

Secondary school in New Mexico, United States

Coordinates: 35.4766°N 108.5470°W

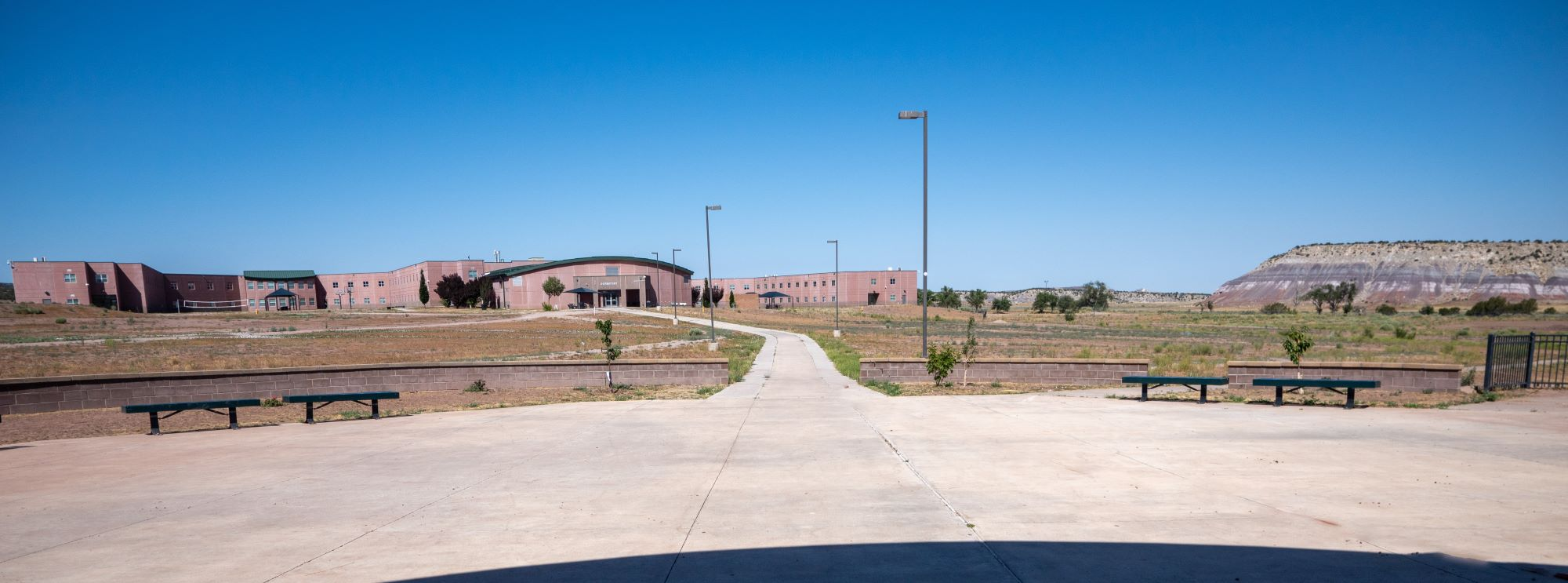

Location
- 1737 Shush Dr; Fort Wingate, New Mexico

Information
- School type: Boarding school
- Teaching staff: 30.50 (FTE)
- Grades: 9-12
- Enrollment: 344 (2023–2024)
- Student to teacher ratio: 11.28
- Affiliation: Bureau of Indian Education

Wingate High School is a Native American high school in unincorporated McKinley County, New Mexico, operated by the Bureau of Indian Education (BIE). It has grades 9-12. It has a Fort Wingate postal address.

It includes boarding facilities.

== History ==
In 1973 the BIA closed Manuelito Hall, a dormitory in Gallup, New Mexico which housed Native American students attending public schools. It planned to send the 110 high school students to Wingate.

Since a 1998 U.S. Supreme Court ruling, New Mexico state law enforcement authorities no longer have jurisdiction at the school. Any crimes committed there are investigated by federal authorities.

In 2003 the BIE selected Wingate as one of several schools to have replacement buildings. That year, the existing auditorium had a crack.

== Student body ==
The school's students are members of the Navajo nation. In 2003 it had about 700 students.

== Campus ==
As of 1956 the dormitory is a former military barracks that also houses students at Wingate Elementary.

== Operations ==
From circa 1973 the school began allowing pregnant students to remain in school, and by 1993 it had family planning services.

== Athletics ==
In 2006 a tennis club was being established in the Fort Wingate community by David Dantzer, and school administrators made plans to use the club as an after-school activity and a mechanism to establish Wingate High's tennis club.
