= Fort Wingate =

Fort near Gallup, New Mexico

- McKinley County, near Gallup, New Mexico
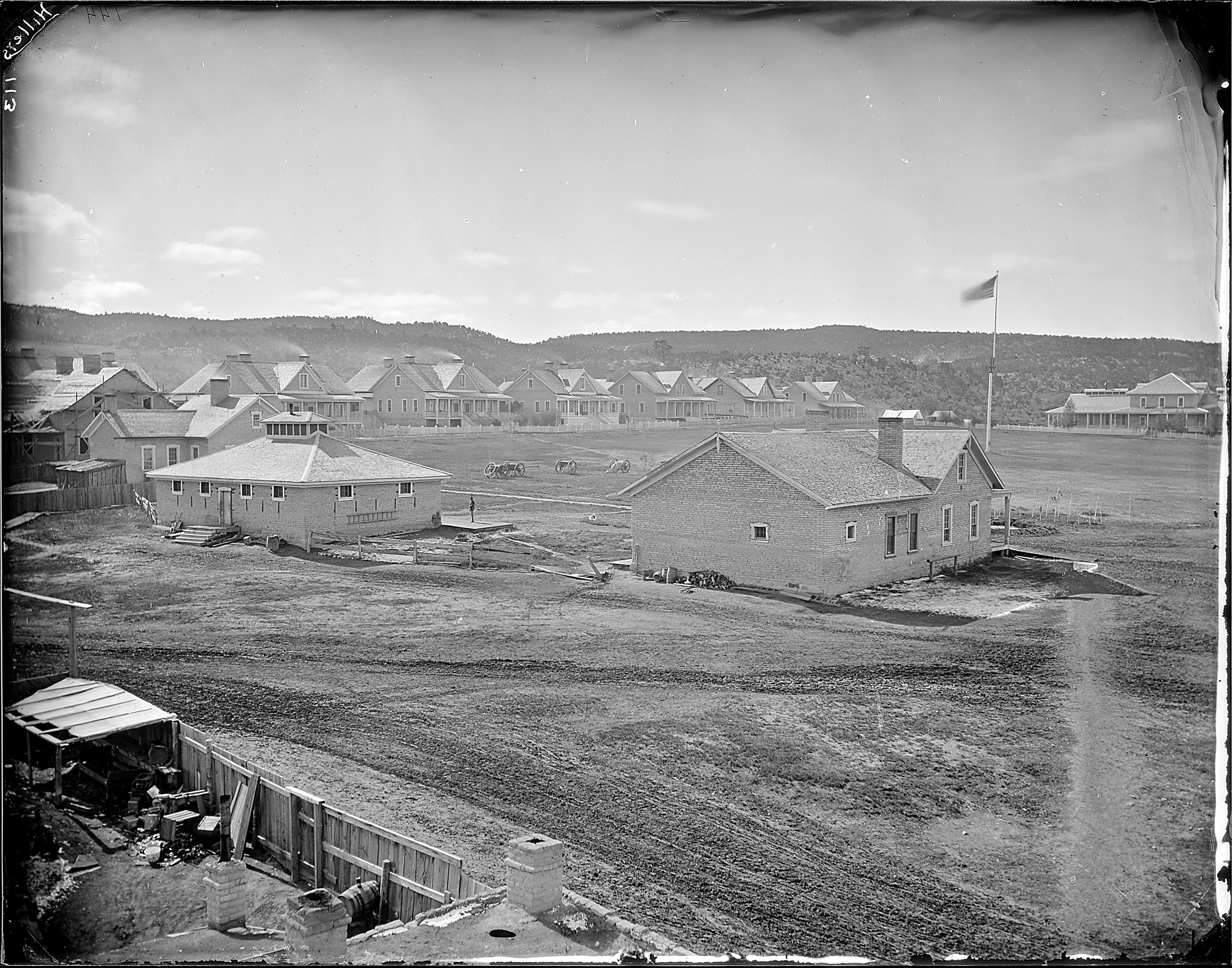
- Fort Wingate in the 1870s

Site information
- Controlled by: New Mexico
- Condition: ammunition depot, storage facility

Location
- Coordinates: 35°06′45″N 107°52′58″W

Site history
- Built: 1862
- Built by: United States
- In use: 1862 - 1993
- Battles/wars: Apache Wars; Navajo Wars

Garrison information
- Past commanders: Kit Carson; William Redwood Price
- Garrison: Navajo Scouts; Apache Scouts; 4th Cavalry; 8th Cavalry; 9th Cavalry and 13th Infantry; 15th Infantry
- Occupants: United States Army

- Fort Wingate Historic District
- U.S. National Register of Historic Places
- U.S. Historic district
- NM State Register of Cultural Properties
- Location within New Mexico Location within the United States
- Location: NM 400, Fort Wingate, New Mexico
- Area: 27 acres (11 ha)
- Built: 1868
- NRHP reference No.: 78003076 (original); 100012191 (increase)
- NMSRCP No.: 403

Significant dates
- Added to NRHP: May 26, 1978
- Boundary increase: March 13, 2026
- Designated NMSRCP: August 22, 1975

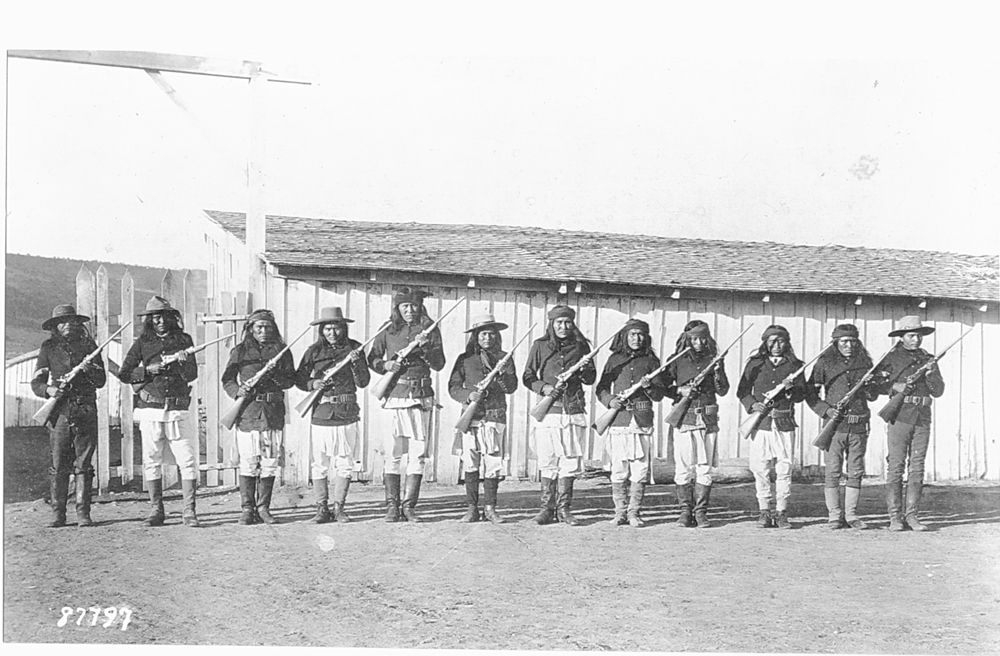
Apache Scouts visiting Fort Wingate during the 1880s.

Fort Wingate was a military installation near Gallup, New Mexico, United States. There were two other locations in New Mexico called Fort Wingate: Seboyeta (1849–1862) and San Rafael (1862–1868). The most recent Fort Wingate (1868–1993) was established at the former site of Fort Lyon, on Navajo territory, initially to control and "protect" the large Navajo tribe to its north. The fort at San Rafael was the staging point for the Navajo deportation known as the Long Walk of the Navajo. From 1870 onward the garrison near Gallup was concerned with Apaches to the south, and through 1890 hundreds of Navajo Scouts were enlisted at the fort.

Fort Wingate supplied 100 tons of Composition B high explosives to the Manhattan Project for use in the first Trinity test and became an ammunition depot "Fort Wingate Depot Activity" from World War II until it was closed by the 1993 Base Realignment and Closure Commission. Environmental cleanup of UXO, perchlorate, and lead as well as land transfer continue to the present day.

The Fort Wingate Historic District was added to the National Register of Historic Places in 1978. The associated community was first listed as the Fort Wingate census-designated place in 2020, with a population of 328 during the 2020 census.

== History ==
- Ojo del Oso (in Spanish meaning "Eye of the Bear" or "Bear Spring") was a Navajo place visited for good grazing and water.

=== 19th century ===
- 1849: A hay camp was set up near Seboyeta, New Mexico and was called Fort Wingate. It was named for Major Benjamin Wingate, 5th U.S. Infantry, who died on 1 June 1862 from wounds he received during the Battle of Valverde.
- 1860: Fort Fauntleroy was established at Bear Springs (Ojo del Oso) as an outpost of Fort Defiance. Colonel Thomas T. Fauntleroy named the fort for himself.
  - 1861: Fort Fauntleroy was renamed Fort Lyon for Brig. Gen. Nathaniel Lyon, a Unionist, when Fauntleroy left New Mexico to join the Provisional Army of Virginia after the state seceded from the Union. Fort Lyon was closed on 10 September 1861 at the start of the Civil War.
- 1862: Fort Wingate was moved near a large spring at San Rafael, New Mexico, also known as "Bikyaya" or "El Gallo" (the rooster). It was designed to house four companies of troops.
  - 1864: Edward Canby ordered Colonel Kit Carson to bring four companies of the First New Mexico Volunteers to the fort to "control" the Navajo.
  - 1864–1866: It was the staging point for the Navajo deportation known as the Long Walk of the Navajo.
  - 1865: The New Mexico Military District had 3,089 troops, 135 of them at Fort Wingate.
- 1868: Fort Wingate was moved back to the former site of Fort Lyon at Ojo del Oso.
  - 1868: Navajo people returning from Bosque Redondo were temporarily settled at the Oso Del Ojo Fort Wingate before spreading out into the newly established Navajo Reservation.
  - 1873–1886: The fort's troops participated in Apache Wars with troops and recruited Navajo Scouts.
  - 1878: Fort Wingate had 137 troops.

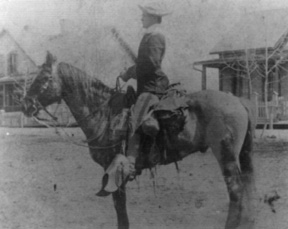
In 1895 Second Lieutenant Cornelius C. Smith, a Medal of Honor recipient, posed with his favorite horse, Blue, in front of his quarters.

  - 1868–1895: Fort Wingate troops often settled disagreements between Navajo and "citizens" in New Mexico.
  - 1891: Fort Wingate troops assisted Arizona units against angry Hopis.

=== 20th century ===
- 1907: Two troops of the 5th Cavalry went from Fort Wingate to the Four Corners area after some armed Navajo. This was the last armed expedition the US Government made against the Navajo. One Navajo was killed and the rest escaped.
- 1911: A Ft. Wingate company of cavalry went to Chaco Canyon and camped there several days to quell a possible uprising by Navajo.
- 1914: During the Mexican Civil War over 2,000 Mexican soldiers and their families took refuge at the fort.
- 1918: Fort Wingate focus turned from Navajo to World War I.
- 1940: Fort Wingate became an ammunition depot from World War II until 1993.
- 1944: Fort Wingate supplied 100 tons of Composition B high explosives to the Manhattan Project for use in the first Trinity test.
- 1950: Bureau of Indian Affairs was given part of the polluted land for an Indian boarding school.
- 1960–67: Redstone and Pershing 1 missiles were tested among others at Wingate.
- 1971: DoD Placed Fort Wingate on reserve and re-designated as "Fort Wingate Depot Activity" or FWDA.
- 1988: the Base Realignment and Closure round 1 decided to close the Fort.
- Environmental restoration activities at FWDA began in 1989.
- January 1993: the Base Realignment and Closure Act (BRAC) closed the post.

=== 21st century ===
- Though the fort's mission ended, the Missile Defense Agency (MDA) continues to use 6,465 acres for launching target rockets to White Sands Missile Range (WSMR).
- In December 2005, the New Mexico Environment Department (NMED) issued the Army a Resource Conservation and Recovery Act (RCRA) Permit.
- As of 2016, FWDA spread across 21,131 acres, occupied 15,280 acres of land and a BRAC acreage of 14,666.
- Environmental cleanup and land transfer to the surrounding community continues to the present, through at least 2022. 5,854 acres have already been transferred to the Department of Interior. Explosives, perchlorates and nitrates are the primary contaminant in the northern groundwater plumes which have not migrated off-post, all other sites consist of relatively minor soil or building contamination without groundwater issues but with explosives, SVOCs, and metals like lead.
- On July 25, 2026, according to McKinley County Fire Rescue, a lightning strike caused a fire that completely destroyed the barracks that had been converted in 1956 to dormitories for the Charles A. Burke Indian School, a boarding school where at least 18 Indigenous children had died according to a 2024 Department of Interior report.

== Geography ==
Fort Wingate is in western McKinley County, with the inhabited portion located 15 miles (24 km) by road east-southeast of Gallup, the county seat. New Mexico State Road 400 runs through the community, leading north 3 miles (5 km) to Interstate 40 and south 8 miles (13 km) to McGaffey.

According to the U.S. Census Bureau, the Fort Wingate census-designated place has an area of 2.02 square miles (5.2 km^{2}), all land. The area drains north toward the South Fork of the Puerco River, part of the Little Colorado River watershed.

== Education ==
There are two Bureau of Indian Education (BIE) boarding schools in the area: Wingate Elementary School, and Wingate High School.

As of 1956 the Wingate Elementary dormitory is a former military barracks that also houses students at Wingate High. In 1968 the girls' dormitory had 125 girls; the Associated Press stated that the dormitory lacked decoration and personal effects and was reflective of a campaign to de-personalize Native American students. At the time the school strongly discouraged students from speaking Navajo and wanted them to only speak English. Circa 1977 it opened a 125-student $90,000 building which used a solar heating system.

The non-BIE school district is Gallup-McKinley County Public Schools. It is zoned to Indian Hills Elementary School, Kennedy Middle School, and Hiroshi Miyamura High School.

== Notable people ==
- Lt. Charles B. Gatewood (1853–1896) led many patrols out of Wingate and later convinced Geronimo to surrender
- 1881–85 General Douglas MacArthur lived at the fort as an infant, with his father, a Captain in command of Company K, 13th US Infantry.
- 1889–90 General John J. (Black Jack) Pershing served as Lieutenant at the fort.

== See also ==
- National Register of Historic Places in McKinley County, New Mexico
