= San Mateo Mountains (Cibola County, New Mexico) =

Mountain range in Cibola and McKinley counties of New Mexico, US

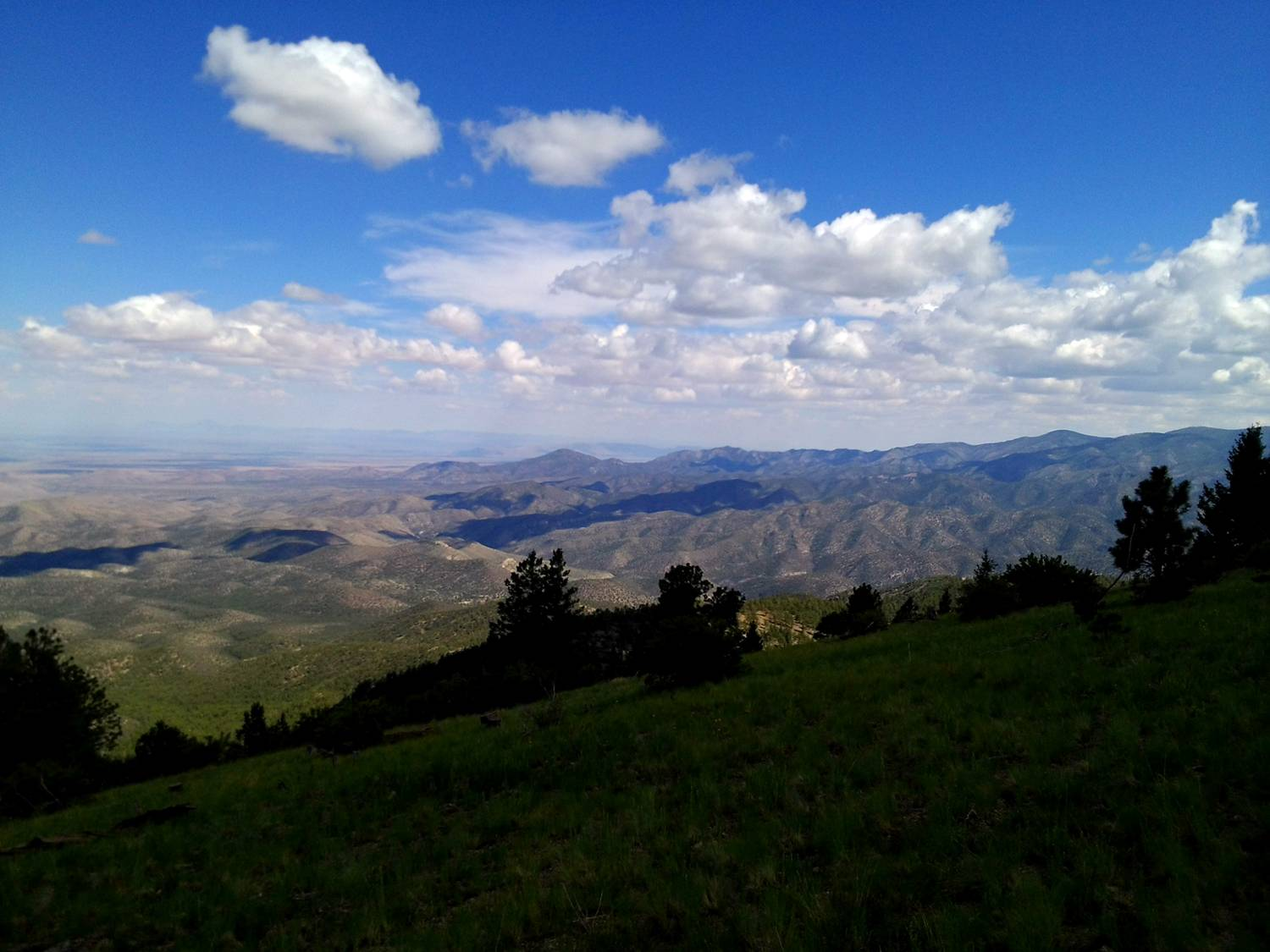

Highest point
- Peak: Mount Taylor (New Mexico)
- Elevation: 11,301 ft (3,445 m)
- Coordinates: 35°14′N 107°37′W

Geography
- Location within New Mexico
- Country: United States
- State: New Mexico
- Counties: Cibola and McKinley

The San Mateo Mountains are a small mountain range in Cibola and McKinley counties of New Mexico, in the southwestern United States. The highest point in the range is Mount Taylor, at 11,301 ft (3,445 m). The range lies just northeast of the community of Grants, and about 60 miles (100 km) west of Albuquerque. This range should not be confused with the identically named range in Socorro County, south of this range.

The San Mateo Mountains are a volcanic range, formed by the eruption of Mount Taylor and its prehistoric ancestors.

Most of the San Mateo Mountains are within the Mount Taylor Ranger District of the Cibola National Forest. There is no designated wilderness area in the range.
