= New Mexico =

U.S. state

New Mexico Nuevo México (Spanish) Yootó Hahoodzo (Navajo)
- State
- Flag Seal
- Nickname: The Land of Enchantment
- Motto: Crescit eundo (It grows as it goes)
- Anthem: "O Fair New Mexico" and "Así Es Nuevo México"
- Location of New Mexico within the United States
- Country: United States
- Before statehood: Santa Fe de Nuevo México (1598–1848); New Mexico Territory (1850–1912)
- Admitted to the Union: January 6, 1912 (47th)
- Capital: Santa Fe
- Largest city: Albuquerque
- Largest county or equivalent: Bernalillo
- Largest metro and urban areas: Albuquerque metropolitan area

Government
  - Governor: Michelle Lujan Grisham (D)
  - Lieutenant Governor: Howie Morales (D)
- Legislature: New Mexico Legislature
  - Upper house: Senate
  - Lower house: House of Representatives
- Judiciary: New Mexico Supreme Court
- U.S. senators: Martin Heinrich (D); Ben Ray Luján (D)
- U.S. House delegation: 1: Melanie Stansbury (D); 2: Gabe Vasquez (D); 3: Teresa Leger Fernández (D); (list)

Area
  - Total: 121,589 sq mi (314,915 km^{2})
  - Land: 121,298 sq mi (314,161 km^{2})
  - Water: 292 sq mi (757 km^{2}) 0.24%
  - Rank: 5th

Dimensions
  - Length: 370 mi (596 km)
  - Width: 343 mi (552 km)
- Elevation: 5,712 ft (1,741 m)
- Highest elevation (Wheeler Peak (Note: Elevation adjusted to North American Vertical Datum of 1988)): 13,161 ft (4,011.4 m)
- Lowest elevation (Red Bluff Reservoir on Texas border): 2,848 ft (868 m)

Population (2025)
  - Total: ▲2,125,498
  - Rank: 36th
  - Density: 17.1/sq mi (6.62/km^{2})
  - Rank: 45th
  - Median household income: $62,300 (2023)
  - Income rank: 43rd
- Demonym(s): New Mexican, Nuevo Mexicano

Language
  - Official language: None; English is the main language, both English and Spanish are working languages
  - Spoken language: English, Spanish (New Mexican, Mexican), Navajo, Apache (Jicarilla, Mescalero, Lipan), Tiwa (Picuris, Southern, Taos), Tewa, Keres, Jemez, Zuni, Comanche, Kiowa, Ute, German, Vietnamese, Mandarin Chinese
- Time zone: UTC−07:00 (Mountain)
  - Summer (DST): UTC−06:00 (MDT)
- USPS abbreviation: NM
- ISO 3166 code: US-NM
- Traditional abbreviation: N.M., N.Mex.
- Latitude: 31°20′ N to 37°N
- Longitude: 103° W to 109°3′ W
- Website: nm.gov

New Mexico (Note: Spanish: Nuevo México, pronounced [ˈnweβo ˈmexiko]; Navajo: Yootó Hahoodzo, pronounced [jòːtʰó hɑ̀hòːtsò]) is a landlocked state in the Southwestern region of the United States. It is one of the Mountain States of the southern Rocky Mountains, sharing the Four Corners region with Utah, Colorado, and Arizona. It also borders the state of Texas to the east and southeast, Oklahoma to the northeast, and shares an international border with the Mexican states of Chihuahua and Sonora to the south. New Mexico's largest city is Albuquerque, and its state capital is Santa Fe, the oldest state capital in the U.S.—founded in 1610 as the government seat of Nuevo México in New Spain—and the highest in elevation, at 7,000 feet (2,134 m).

New Mexico is the fifth-largest of the fifty states by area, but with just over 2.1 million residents, ranks 36th in population and 45th in population density. Its climate and geography are highly varied, ranging from forested mountains to sparse deserts; the northern and eastern regions exhibit a colder alpine climate, while the west and south are warmer and more arid. The Rio Grande and its fertile valley runs north-to-south, creating a riparian biome through the center of the state that supports a bosque habitat and distinct Albuquerque Basin climate. One-third of New Mexico's land is federally owned, including many protected wilderness areas, 15 national parks and monuments, and three UNESCO World Heritage Sites wholly contained within the state—the most of any U.S. state.

Since time immemorial, New Mexico was home to Pueblo peoples, the Mogollon culture, and Ute. The Pueblo peoples occupied several dozen villages, mostly in northern New Mexico's Rio Grande valley. The Navajo and Apache arrived in the late 1400s, the Spanish in 1598, and the Comanche in the early 1700s. The Spanish colony of Nuevo México became a peripheral part of the viceroyalty of New Spain. The 1680 Pueblo Revolt was the first successful revolution against colonial rule in the Americas. In 1692 Spanish colonial rule returned, but the colony fell under the influence of Comancheria with the Comanche-Spanish peace treaties of 1785 and 1786, isolated by its rugged terrain and distance from Mexico City. Upon Mexican independence in 1821, New Mexico became an autonomous territory that saw an 1837 Rebellion against the central government, with increasing economic ties to the United States. After the Mexican–American War in 1848, the U.S. annexed New Mexico as part of the larger New Mexico Territory, which was central to U.S. westward expansion. New Mexico was a territory for 64 years before it was admitted to the Union as the 47th state on January 6, 1912. During World War II, New Mexico hosted several key facilities of the Manhattan Project, which developed the world's first atomic bomb, and was the site of the first nuclear test, Trinity in 1945.

The convergence of Pueblo, Apache, Navajo, Comanche, Ute, Spanish, Mexican, and American influences throughout history led to a culture with unique cuisine, Spanish dialect, music, and the Pueblo Revival and Territorial styles of architecture. As one of nine majority-minority states, it has the nation's highest proportion of Hispanic and Latino Americans and the second-highest proportion of Native Americans, after Alaska. It is home to one-third of the Navajo Nation, 19 federally recognized Pueblo communities, and three federally recognized Apache tribes. The large Latino population includes Hispanos descended from families in the colonies period alongside more recent Mexican Americans. The New Mexican flag, which is among the most recognizable in the U.S., reflects indigenous and Spanish inspiration.

New Mexico's economy is highly diversified; major sectors include mining, oil and gas, aerospace, media, and film. Its total real gross domestic product (GDP) was $152.778 billion in 2025, with a GDP per capita of $61,645. New Mexico often ranks low in wealth, healthcare, and education, but has some of the highest concentrations of scientists, engineers, along with other highly skilled workers, and one of the most educated (albeit very small) counties in the U.S.: Los Alamos County. The federal government has a significant presence in New Mexico, including U.S. military installations such as White Sands Missile Range and Kirtland Air Force Base, and Department of Energy research centers such as the Sandia and Los Alamos National Laboratories.

== Etymology ==
New Mexico received its name long before the present-day country of Mexico won independence from Spain and adopted that name in 1821. The name "Mexico" derives from Nahuatl and originally referred to the heartland of the Mexica, the rulers of the Aztec Empire, in the Valley of Mexico. After conquering the Aztecs in the early 16th century, the Spanish began exploring what is now the Southwestern United States, calling it Nuevo México after the region known as the Kingdom of Mexico. In 1581, the Chamuscado and Rodríguez Expedition named the region north of the Rio Grande San Felipe del Nuevo México. The Spaniards had hoped to find wealthy indigenous cultures similar to the Mexica; the indigenous cultures of New Mexico proved to be unrelated to the Mexica and lacking in riches, but the name persisted.

Before statehood in 1912, the name "New Mexico" loosely applied to various configurations of territories in the same general area, which evolved throughout the Spanish, Mexican, and U.S. periods, but typically encompassed most of present-day New Mexico along with sections of neighboring states.

== History ==
Ancestral Pueblo territory shown in pink over New Mexico

=== Prehistory ===
The first known inhabitants of New Mexico were members of the Clovis culture of Paleo-Indians. Footprints discovered in 2017 suggest that humans may have been present in the region as long ago as 21,000–23,000 BC. Later inhabitants include the Mogollon, Ancestral Pueblo cultures, which are characterized by sophisticated pottery work and urban development; pueblos or their remnants, like those at Acoma, Taos, and Chaco Culture National Historical Park, indicate the scale of Ancestral Puebloan dwellings within the area. These cultures and the Ute form part of the broader Oasisamerica region of pre-Contact North America.

Navajos may be descendants of the lost Naha tribe, a Slavey tribe from the Nahanni region west of Great Slave Lake.

The vast trade networks of the Ancestral Puebloans led to legends throughout Mesoamerica and the Aztec Empire (Mexico) of an unseen northern empire that rivaled their own, which they called Yancuic Mexico, literally translated as "a new Mexico".

=== First Spanish colonial period ===
Aztec legends of a prosperous empire to their north became the primary basis for the mythical Seven Cities of Gold, which spurred exploration by Spanish conquistadors following their conquest of the Aztecs in the early 16th century; prominent explorers included Álvar Núñez Cabeza de Vaca, Andrés Dorantes de Carranza, Alonso del Castillo Maldonado, Estevanico, and Marcos de Niza.

In 1539, Esteban de Dorantes became the first person from the Old World to reach New Mexico, where he was killed by Pueblo peoples. Francisco Vázquez de Coronado arrived in 1540. In 1598 conquistador Juan de Oñate y Salazar began the Spanish colonization of New Mexico. The campaign included Oñate's 1599 Ácoma Massacre. Oñate arrived at Acoma Pueblo on January 21 with an army including cannons and muskets. The Spanish set fire to the Pueblo. Approximately 800–1,000 Ácoma were murdered. After this initial attack, on February 12, Oñate ordered that the right foot be cut off every man over 25.

The settlement of La Villa Real de la Santa Fe de San Francisco de Asís—modern day Santa Fe – was established by Pedro de Peralta as a more permanent capital at the foot of the Sangre de Cristo Mountains in 1610.

=== Pueblo Revolt ===
The first successful revolution against European rule in the Americas occurred with the 1680 Pueblo Revolt. From Taos Pueblo, the Pueblo leader Po'pay rallied the Pueblo peoples into expelling the Spanish from New Mexico. He would rule the Pueblo confederation until his death.

=== Return of the Spanish ===
After the death of Pueblo leader Po'pay, some Pueblo leaders invited the Spanish to return to New Mexico. Diego de Vargas led the return of the Spanish in 1692. with Puebloans offered greater cultural and religious liberties. Compared to the previous colonial regime, the Spanish sought relative compromise with the Pueblos on religious matters, seeking to avoid another revolt. Beyond forging better relations with the Pueblos, governors were forbearing in their approach to the indigenous peoples, such as was with governor Tomás Vélez Cachupín; the comparatively large reservations in New Mexico and Arizona are partly a legacy of Spanish treaties recognizing indigenous land claims in Nuevo México.

Returning settlers founded La Villa de Alburquerque in 1706 at Old Town Albuquerque as a trading center for existing surrounding communities such as Barelas, Isleta, Los Ranchos, and Sandia; it was named for the viceroy of New Spain, Francisco Fernández de la Cueva, 10th Duke of Alburquerque. Governor Francisco Cuervo y Valdés established the villa in Tiguex to provide free trade access and facilitate cultural exchange in the region.

=== Increased Comanche influence ===
To encourage settlement in its vulnerable periphery amidst the increased power and reach of Comanche raids, Spain awarded land grants to European settlers in Nuevo México; due to the scarcity of water throughout the region, the vast majority of colonists resided in the central valley of the Rio Grande and its tributaries. Most communities were walled enclaves consisting of adobe houses that opened onto a plaza, from which four streets ran outward to small, private agricultural plots and orchards; these were watered by acequias, community owned and operated irrigation canals. Just beyond the wall was the ejido, communal land for grazing, firewood, or recreation.

While New Mexico was legally part of New Spain, it fell under the influence of Comancheria in the 1785 and 1786 Comanche-Spanish peace treaties and became a de facto protectorate, with New Mexico refusing multiple orders from Madrid and Mexico City to go to war with the Comanche. Nevertheless, relations between the various indigenous groups and Spanish settlers remained nebulous and complex, varying from trade and commerce to cultural assimilation and intermarriage to total warfare. During most of the 18th century, raids by Navajo, Apache, and especially Comanche inhibited the growth and prosperity of New Mexico. The region's harsh environment and remoteness, surrounded by hostile Native Americans, fostered a greater degree of self-reliance, as well as pragmatic cooperation, between the Pueblo peoples and colonists. Many indigenous communities enjoyed a large measure of autonomy well into the late 19th century due to the improved governance.

By 1800, the population of New Mexico had reached 25,000 (not including indigenous inhabitants), far exceeding the territories of California and Texas.

=== Mexican territorial period ===
Territory of Santa Fe de Nuevo México when it belonged to Mexico in 1824

As part of New Spain, the province of New Mexico became part of the First Mexican Empire in 1821 following the Mexican War of Independence. Upon its secession from Mexico in 1836, the Republic of Texas claimed the portion east of the Rio Grande, based on the erroneous assumption that the older Hispanic settlements of the upper Rio Grande were the same as the newly established Mexican settlements of Texas. The Texan Santa Fe Expedition was launched to seize the contested territory but failed with the capture and imprisonment of the entire army by the Hispanic New Mexico militia.

At the turn of the 19th century, France still claimed northeastern New Mexico—the area north of the Canadian River and east of the Sangre de Cristos—before selling it in the 1803 Louisiana Purchase. In 1812, the U.S. reclassified the land as part of the Missouri Territory. This region of New Mexico (along with territory comprising present-day southeastern Colorado, the Texas and Oklahoma Panhandles, and southwestern Kansas) was ceded to Spain under the Adams-Onis Treaty in 1819.

When the First Mexican Republic began to transition into the Centralist Republic of Mexico, they began to centralize power ignoring the sovereignty of Santa Fe and disregarding Pueblo land rights. The end of Spanish protectionism led to New Mexico becoming financially and politically tied to the U.S., and preferring trade along the Santa Fe Trail. This led to the Río Arriba Rebellion in 1837, which established the Cantón de Nuevo México led by Taos Pueblo members José María González and Pablo Montoya. The rebellion began with the assassination of Centralist governor Albino Pérez and ended with the execution of González was executed by governor Manuel Armijo. Subsequent governor Juan Bautista Vigil y Alarid agreed with some of the underlying sentiment.

=== Initial American territorial period ===
Following the victory of the United States in the Mexican–American War (1846–48), Mexico ceded its northern territories to the U.S., including California, Texas, and New Mexico. The Americans were initially heavy-handed in their treatment of former Mexican citizens, triggering the Taos Revolt in 1847 by Hispanos and their Pueblo allies; the insurrection led to the death of territorial governor Charles Bent and the collapse of the civilian government established by Stephen W. Kearny. In response, the U.S. government appointed local Donaciano Vigil as governor to better represent New Mexico, and also vowed to accept the land rights of Hispanos and grant them citizenship. In 1864, President Abraham Lincoln symbolized the recognition of Native land rights with the Lincoln Canes, sceptres of office gifted to each of the Pueblos, a tradition dating back to Spanish and Mexican eras.

After the Republic of Texas was admitted as a state in 1846, it attempted to claim the eastern portion of New Mexico east of the Rio Grande, while the California Republic and State of Deseret each claimed parts of western New Mexico. Under the Compromise of 1850, these regions were forced by the U.S. government to drop their claims, Texas received $10 million in federal funds, California was granted statehood, and officially establishing the Utah Territory; therein recognizing most of New Mexico's historically established land claims. Pursuant to the compromise, Congress established the New Mexico Territory in September of that year; it included most of present-day Arizona and New Mexico, along with the Las Vegas Valley and what would later become Clark County in Nevada.

In 1853 the U.S. acquired the mostly desert southwestern bootheel of the state, along with Arizona's land south of the Gila River, in the Gadsden Purchase, which was needed for the right-of-way to encourage construction of a transcontinental railroad.

=== Postwar American territorial period ===
The end of the Civil War saw rapid economic development and settlement in New Mexico, which attracted homesteaders, ranchers, cowboys, businessmen, and outlaws; many of the folklore characters of the Western genre had their origins in New Mexico, most notably businesswoman Maria Gertrudis Barceló, outlaw Billy the Kid, and lawmen Pat Garrett and Elfego Baca. The influx of "Anglo Americans" from the eastern U.S. (which include African Americans and recent European immigrants) reshaped the state's economy, culture, and politics. Into the late 19th century, the majority of New Mexicans remained ethnic mestizos of mixed Spanish and Native American ancestry (primarily Pueblo, Navajo, Apache, Genízaro, and Comanche), many of whom had roots going back to Spanish settlement in the 16th century; this distinctly New Mexican ethnic group became known as Hispanos and developed a more pronounced identity vis-a-vis the newer Anglo arrivals. Politically, they still controlled most town and county offices through local elections, and wealthy ranching families commanded considerable influence, preferring business, legislative, and judicial relations with fellow indigenous New Mexican groups. By contrast, Anglo Americans, who were "outnumbered, but well-organized and growing" tended to have more ties to the territorial government, whose officials were appointed by the U.S. federal government; subsequently, newer residents of New Mexico generally favored maintaining territorial status, which they saw as a check on Native and Hispano influence.

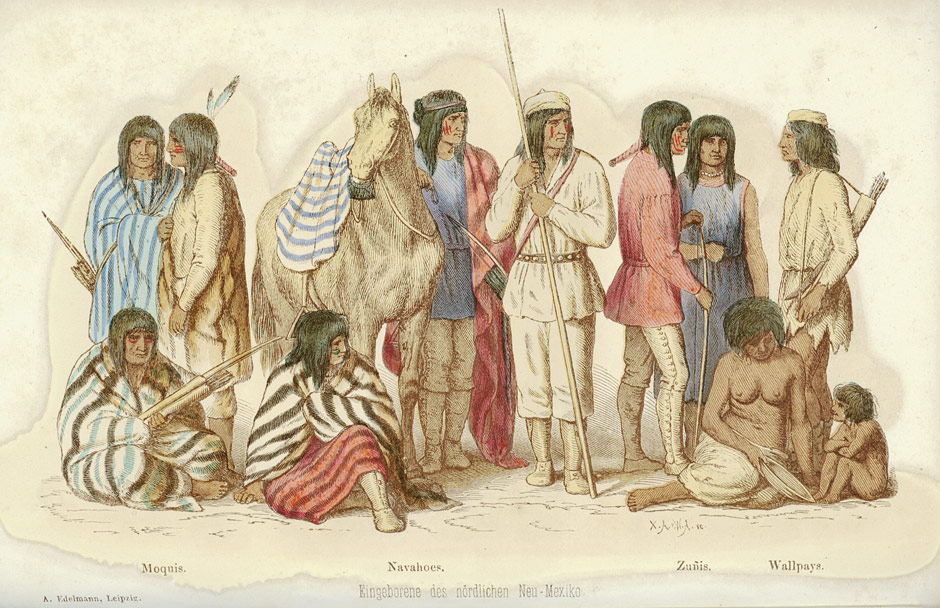
"The indigenous people of northern New Mexico" by Balduin Möllhausen, 1861

A consequence of the civil war was intensifying conflict with indigenous peoples, which was part of the broader American Indian Wars along the frontier. The withdrawal of troops and material for the war effort had prompted raids by hostile tribes, and the federal government moved to subdue the many native communities that had been effectively autonomous throughout the colonial period. Following the elimination of the Confederate threat, Brigadier General James Carleton, who had assumed command of the Military Department of New Mexico in 1862, led what he described as a "merciless war against all hostile tribes" that aimed to "force them to their knees, and then confine them to reservations where they could be Christianized and instructed in agriculture." With famed frontiersman Kit Carson placed in charge of troops in the field, powerful indigenous groups such as the Navajo, Mescalero Apache, Kiowa, and Comanche were brutally pacified through a scorched earth policy, and thereafter forced into barren and remote reservations. Sporadic conflicts continued into the late 1880s, most notably the guerilla campaigns led by Apache chiefs Victorio and his son-in-law Nana.

The political and cultural clashes between these competing ethnic groups sometimes culminated in mob violence, including lynchings of Native, Hispanic, and Mexican peoples, as was attempted at the Frisco shootout in 1884. Nevertheless, prominent figures from across these communities, and from both the Democratic and Republican parties, attempted to fight this prejudice and forge a more cohesive, multiethnic New Mexican identity; they include lawmen Baca and Garrett, and governors Curry, Hagerman, and Otero. Indeed, some territorial governors, like Lew Wallace, had served in both the Mexican and American militaries.

In the early to mid-20th century, the art presence in Santa Fe grew, and it became known as one of the world's great art centers. The presence of artists such as Georgia O'Keeffe attracted many others, including those along Canyon Road. In the late 20th century, Native Americans were authorized by federal law to establish gaming casinos on their reservations under certain conditions, in states which had authorized such gaming. Such facilities have helped tribes close to population centers generate revenues for reinvestment in the economic development and welfare of their peoples. The Albuquerque metropolitan area is home to several casinos as a result.

=== Statehood ===
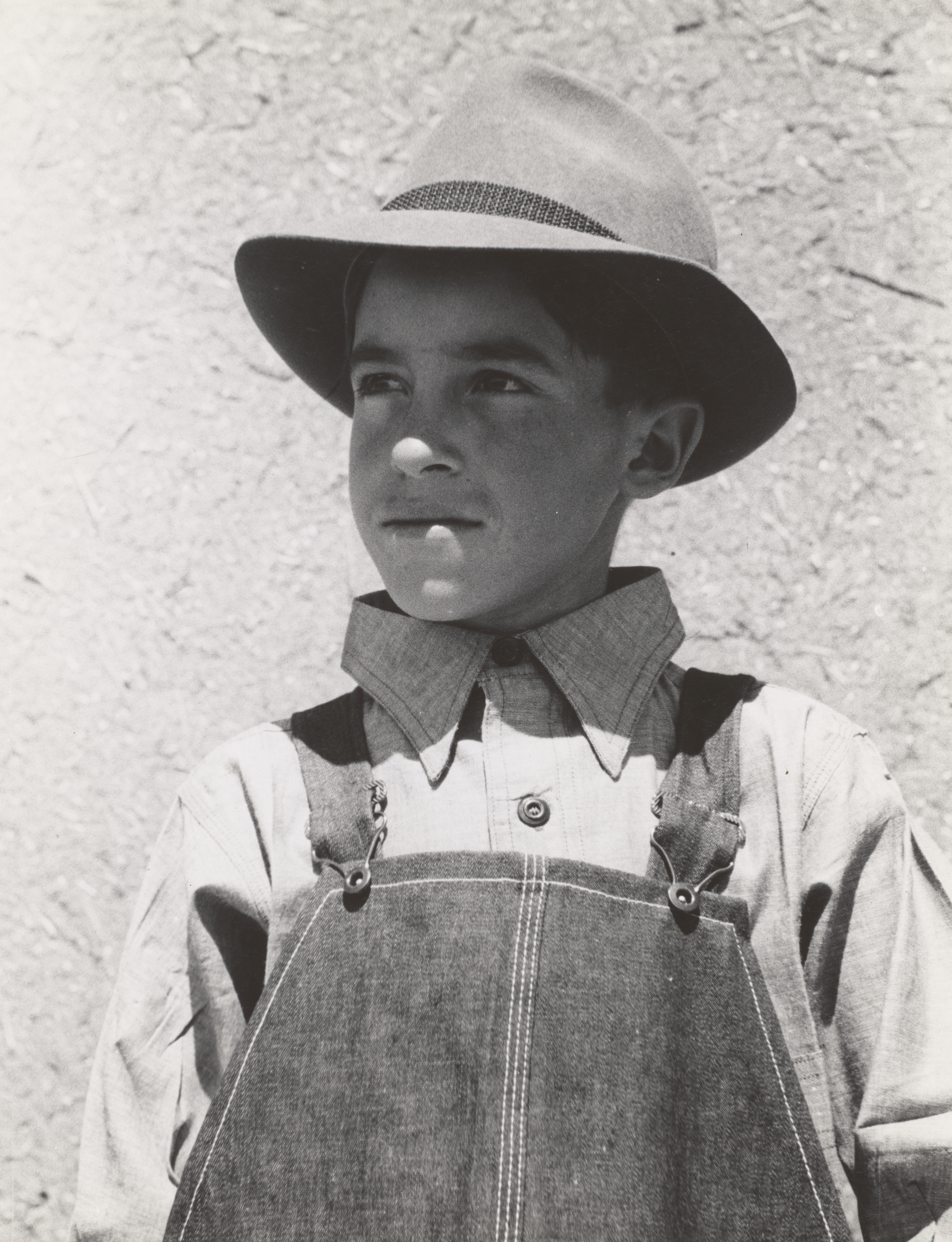
A Hispano boy in Chamisal, 1940

The United States Congress admitted New Mexico as the 47th state on January 6, 1912. It had been eligible for statehood 60 years earlier, but was delayed due to the perception that its majority Hispanic population was "alien" to U.S. culture and political values. When the U.S. entered the First World War roughly five years later, New Mexicans volunteered in significant numbers, in part to prove their loyalty as full-fledged citizens of the U.S. The state ranked fifth in the nation for military service, enlisting more than 17,000 recruits from all 33 counties; over 500 New Mexicans were killed in the war. Indigenous-Hispanic families had long been established since the Spanish and Mexican era, but most American settlers in the state had an uneasy relationship with the large Native American tribes. Most indigenous New Mexicans lived on reservations and near old placitas and villas. In 1924, Congress passed a law granting all Native Americans U.S. citizenship and the right to vote in federal and state elections. However, Anglo-American arrivals into New Mexico enacted Jim Crow laws against Hispanos, Hispanic Americans, and those who did not pay taxes, targeting indigenous affiliated individuals; because Hispanics often had interpersonal relationships with indigenous peoples, they were often subject to segregation, social inequality, and employment discrimination.

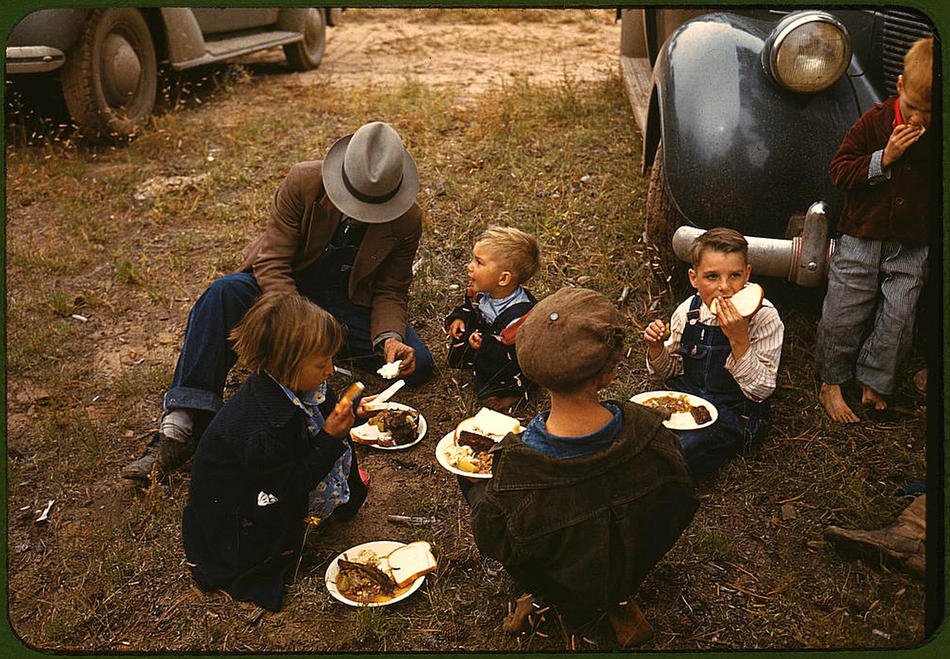
A homesteader and his children at the New Mexico Fair in Pie Town, New Mexico, 1940

During the fight for women's suffrage in the United States, New Mexico's Hispano and Mexican women at the forefront included Trinidad Cabeza de Baca, Dolores "Lola" Armijo, Mrs. James Chavez, Aurora Lucero, Anita "Mrs. Secundino" Romero, Arabella "Mrs. Cleofas" Romero and her daughter, Marie.

A major oil discovery in 1928 near the town of Hobbs brought greater wealth to the state, especially in surrounding Lea County. The New Mexico Bureau of Mines and Mineral Resources called it "the most important single discovery of oil in New Mexico's history". Nevertheless, agriculture and cattle ranching remained the primary economic activities.

=== World War II and aftermath ===
New Mexico was greatly transformed by the U.S. entry into the Second World War in December 1941. As in the First World War, patriotism ran high among New Mexicans, including among marginalized Hispanic and indigenous communities; on a per capita basis, New Mexico produced more volunteers, and suffered more casualties, than any other state. The war also spurred economic development, particularly in extractive industries, with the state becoming a leading supplier of several strategic resources. New Mexico's rough terrain and geographic isolation made it an attractive location for several sensitive military and scientific installations; the most famous was Los Alamos, one of the central facilities of the Manhattan Project, where the first atomic bombs were designed and manufactured. The first bomb was tested at Trinity site in the desert between Socorro and Alamogordo, which is today part of the White Sands Missile Range.

As a legacy of the Second World War, New Mexico continues to receive large amounts of federal government spending on major military and research institutions that continue to this day. In addition to the White Sands Missile Range, the state hosts three U.S. Air Force bases that were established or expanded during the war. While the high military presence brought considerable investment, it has also been the center of controversy; on May 22, 1957, a B-36 accidentally dropped a nuclear bomb 4.5 miles from the control tower while landing at Kirtland Air Force Base in Albuquerque; only its conventional "trigger" detonated. The Los Alamos National Laboratory and Sandia National Laboratories, two of the nation's leading federal scientific research facilities, originated from the Manhattan Project. The focus on high technology is still a top priority of the state, to the extent that it became a center for unidentified flying objects, especially following the 1947 Roswell incident.

New Mexico's population nearly doubled from roughly 532,000 in 1940 to over 954,000 by 1960. In addition to federal personnel and agencies, many residents and businesses moved to the state, particularly from the northeast, often drawn by its warm climate and low taxes. The pattern continues into the 21st century, with New Mexico adding over 400,000 residents between 2000 and 2020.

Native Americans from New Mexico fought for the United States in both world wars. Returning veterans were disappointed to find their civil rights limited by state discrimination. In Arizona and New Mexico, veterans challenged state laws or practices prohibiting them from voting. In 1948, after veteran Miguel Trujillo Sr. of Isleta Pueblo was told by the county registrar that he could not register to vote, he filed suit against the county in federal district court. A three-judge panel overturned as unconstitutional New Mexico's provisions that Native Americans who did not pay taxes (and could not document if they had paid taxes) could not vote. (Note: "Any other citizen, regardless of race, in the State of New Mexico who has not paid one cent of tax of any kind or character, if he possesses the other qualifications, may vote. An Indian, and only an Indian, in order to meet the qualifications to vote, must have paid a tax. How you can escape the conclusion that makes a requirement with respect to an Indian as a qualification to exercise the elective franchise and does not make that requirement with respect to the member of any race is beyond me.")

=== 21st century ===
In the 21st century, employment growth areas in New Mexico include electronic circuitry, scientific research, information technology, casinos, art of the American Southwest, food, film, and media, particularly in Albuquerque. The state was the founding location of Micro Instrumentation and Telemetry Systems, which led to the founding of Microsoft in Albuquerque. Intel maintains their F11X in Rio Rancho, which also hosts an IT center for HP Inc. New Mexico's culinary scene became recognized and is now a source of revenue for the state. Albuquerque Studios has become a filming hub for Netflix, and it has brought to the state international media production companies like NBCUniversal.

The COVID-19 pandemic was confirmed to have reached the U.S. state of New Mexico on March 11, 2020. On December 23, 2020, the New Mexico Department of Health reported 1,174 new COVID-19 cases and 40 deaths, bringing the cumulative statewide totals to 133,242 cases and 2,243 deaths since the start of the pandemic.

== Geography ==
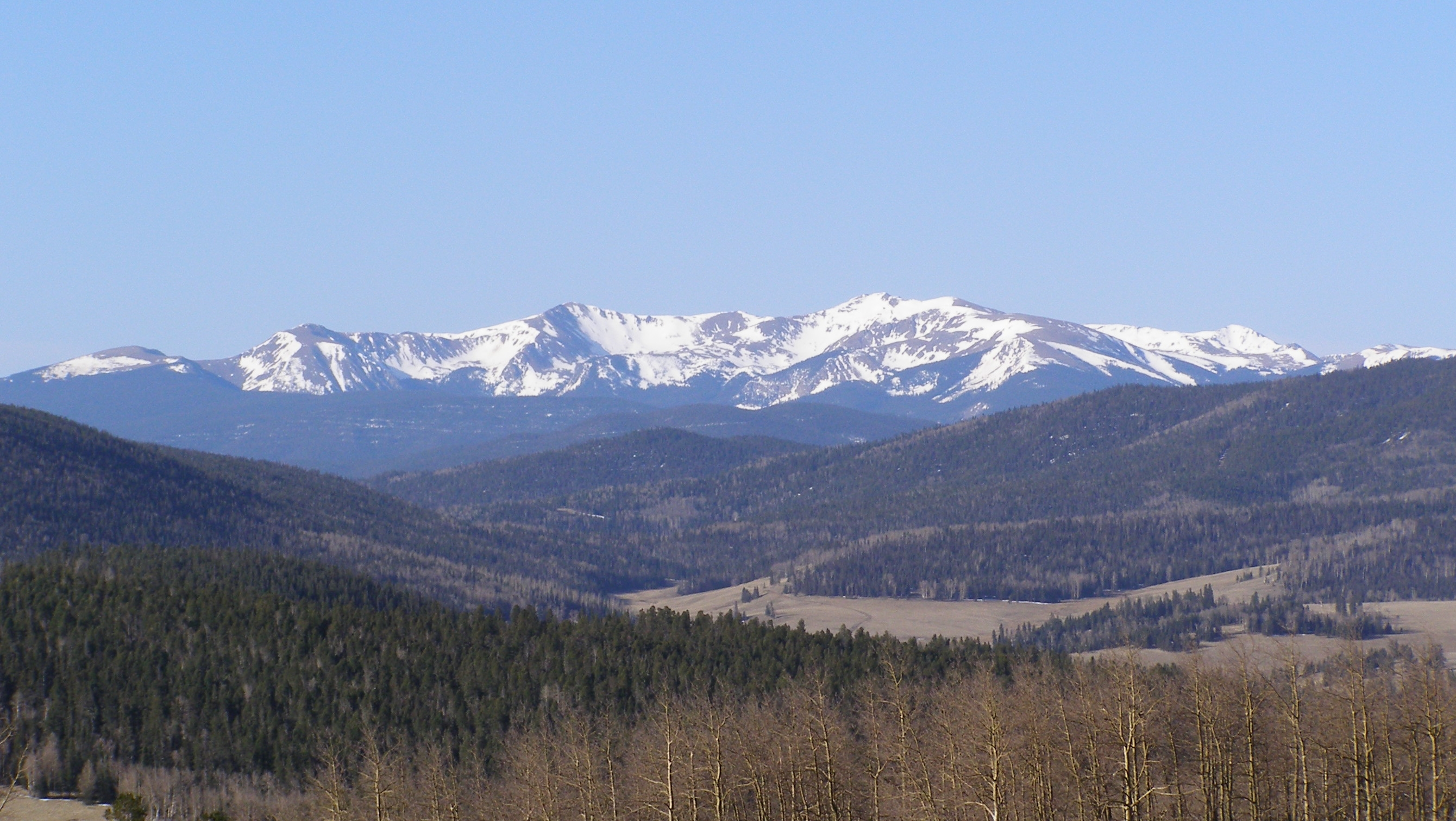
Wheeler Peak in the Sangre de Cristo Range

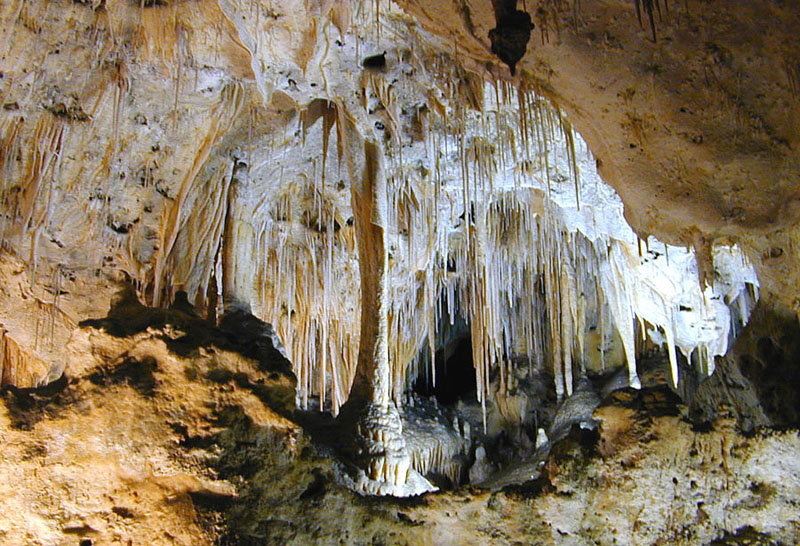
Carlsbad Caverns National Park

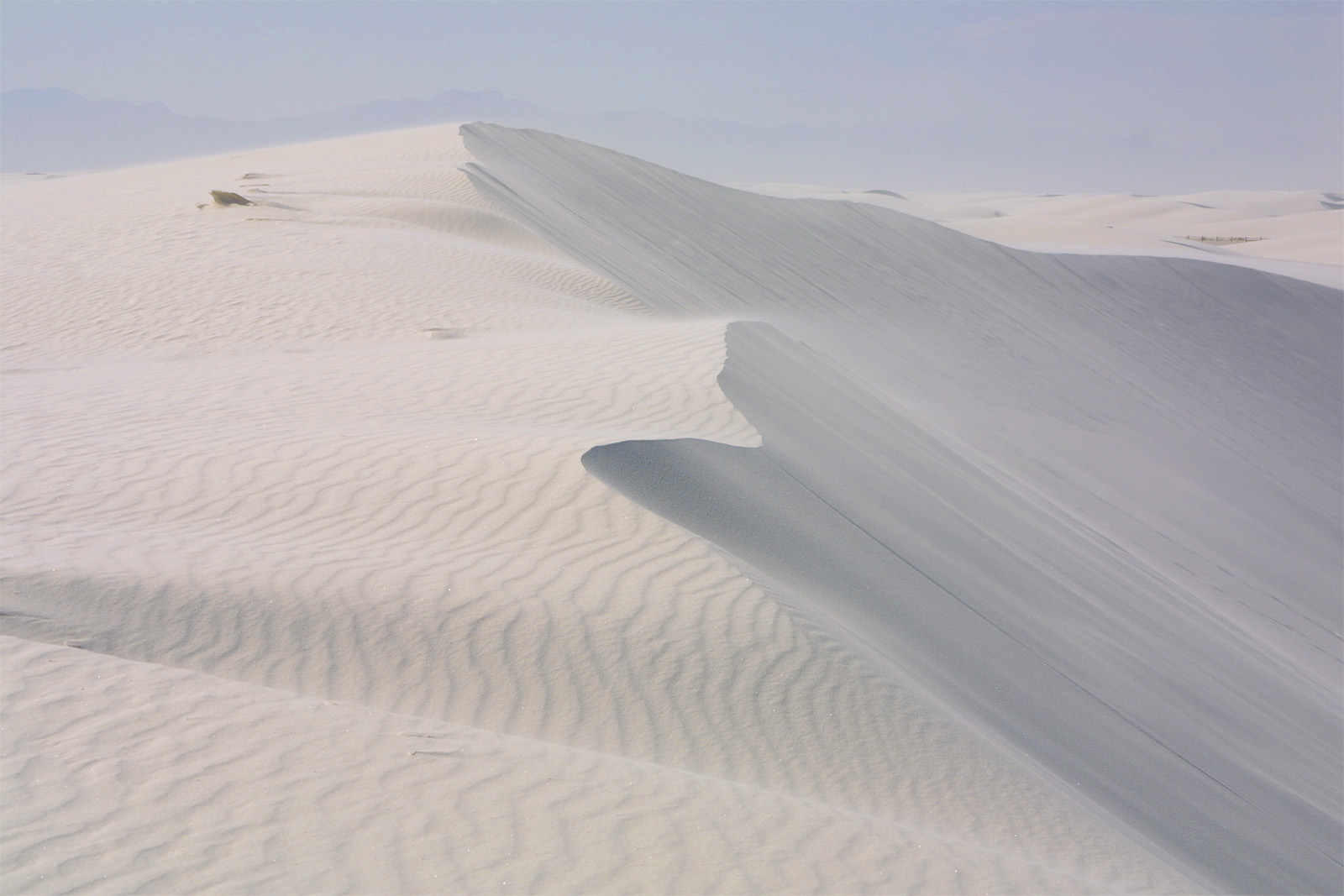
White Sands National Park

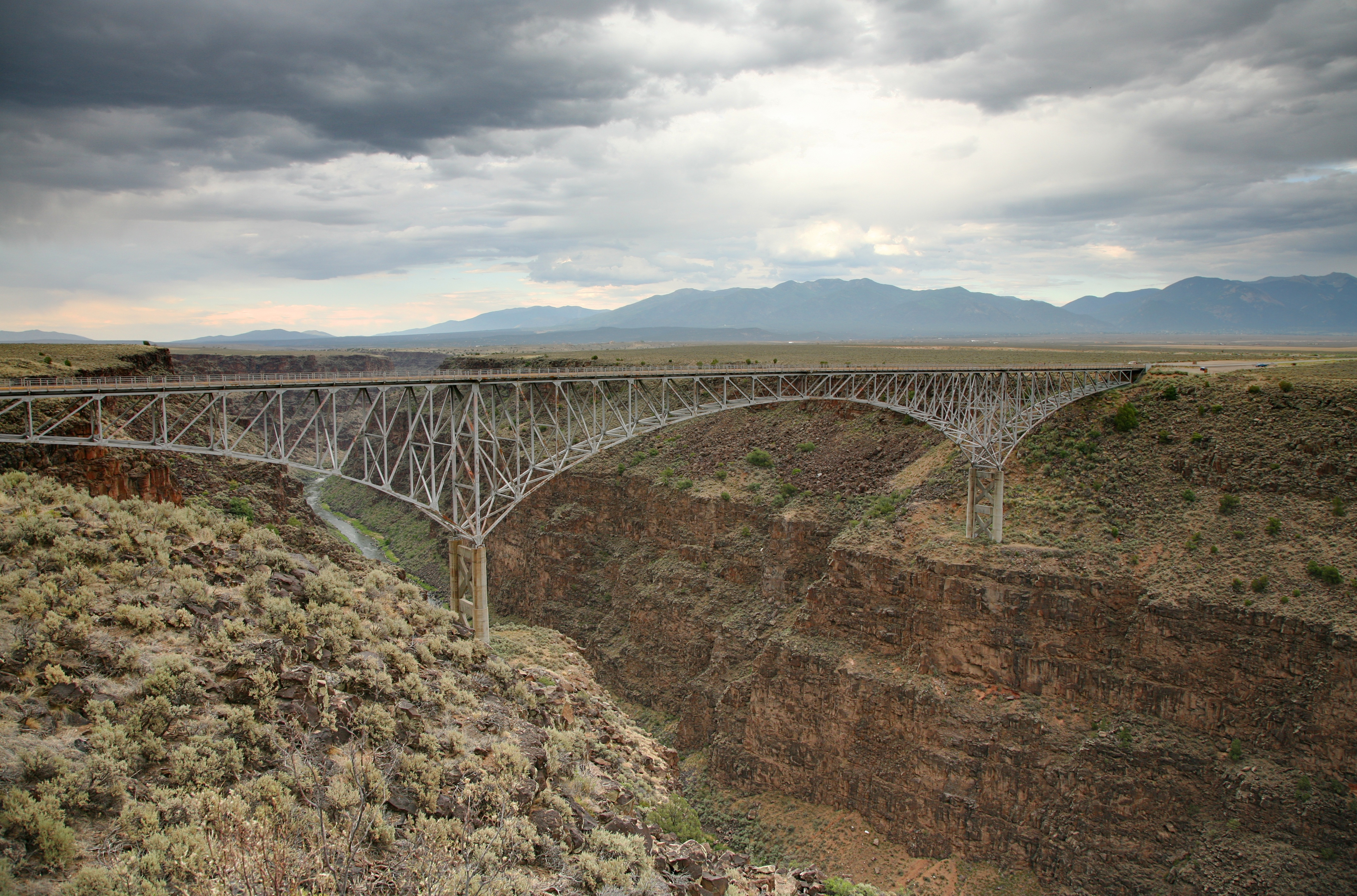
Rio Grande Gorge and Bridge

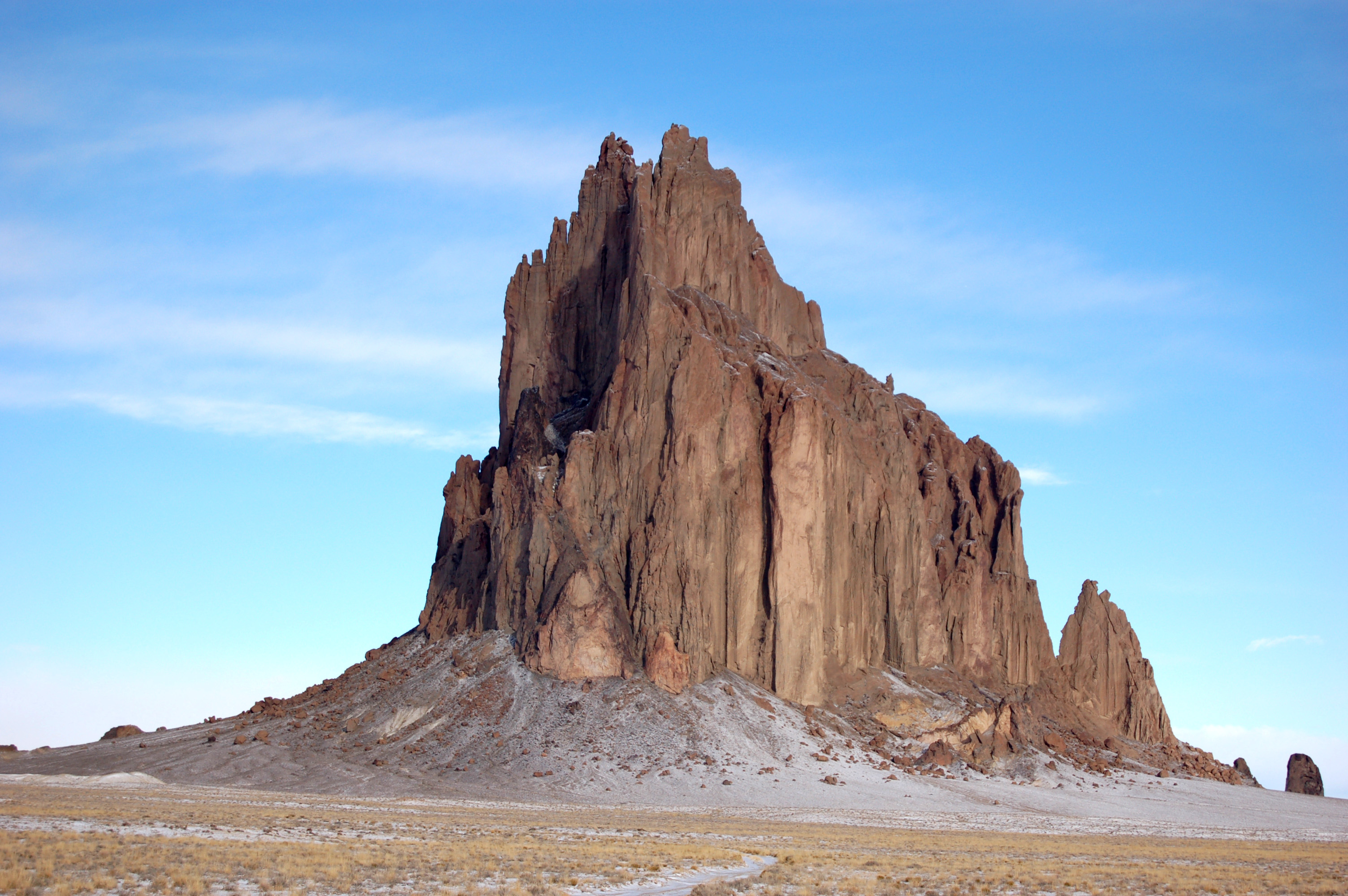
Shiprock

With a total area of 121,590 square miles (314,900 km^{2}), New Mexico is the fifth-largest state, after Alaska, Texas, California, and Montana. Its eastern border lies along 103°W longitude with the state of Oklahoma, and 2.2 miles (3.5 kilometres) west of 103°W longitude with Texas due to a 19th-century surveying error. On the southern border, Texas makes up the eastern two-thirds, while the Mexican states of Chihuahua and Sonora make up the western third, with Chihuahua making up about 90% of that. The western border with Arizona runs along the 109° 03'W longitude. The southwestern corner of the state is known as the Bootheel. The 37°N parallel forms the northern boundary with Colorado. The states of New Mexico, Colorado, Arizona, and Utah come together at the Four Corners in New Mexico's northwestern corner. Its surface water area is about 292 square miles (760 km^{2}).

Despite its popular depiction as mostly arid desert, New Mexico has one of the most diverse landscapes of any U.S. state, ranging from wide, auburn-colored deserts and verdant grasslands, to broken mesas and high, snow-capped peaks. Close to a third of the state is covered in timberland, with heavily forested mountain wildernesses dominating the north. The Sangre de Cristo Mountains, the southernmost part of the Rocky Mountains, run roughly north–south along the east side of the Rio Grande, in the rugged, pastoral north. The Great Plains extend into the eastern third of the state, most notably the Llano Estacado ("Staked Plain"), whose westernmost boundary is marked by the Mescalero Ridge escarpment. The northwestern quadrant of New Mexico is dominated by the Colorado Plateau, characterized by unique volcanic formations, dry grasslands and shrublands, open pinyon-juniper woodland, and mountain forests. The Chihuahuan Desert, which is the largest in North America, extends through the south.

Over four–fifths of New Mexico is higher than 4,000 feet (1,200 meters) above sea level. The average elevation ranges from up to 8,000 feet (2,400 meters) above sea level in the northwest, to less than 4,000 feet (1,200 meters) in the southeast. The highest point is Wheeler Peak at over 13,160 feet (4,010 meters) in the Sangre de Cristo Mountains, while the lowest is the Red Bluff Reservoir at around 2,840 feet (870 meters), in the southeastern corner of the state.

In addition to the Rio Grande, which is tied for the fourth-longest river in the U.S., New Mexico has four other major river systems: the Pecos, Canadian, San Juan, and Gila. Nearly bisecting New Mexico from north to south, the Rio Grande has played an influential role in the region's history; its fertile floodplain has supported human habitation since prehistoric times, and European settlers initially lived exclusively in its valleys and along its tributaries. The Pecos, which flows roughly parallel to the Rio Grande to the east, was a popular route for explorers, as was the Canadian River, which rises in the mountainous north and flows east across the arid plains. The San Juan and Gila lie west of the Continental Divide, in the northwest and southwest, respectively. Except for the Gila, all major rivers are dammed in New Mexico and provide a major water source for irrigation and flood control.

=== Climate ===
New Mexico has long been known for its dry, temperate climate. Overall, the state is semi-arid to arid, with areas of continental and alpine climates at higher elevations. New Mexico's statewide average precipitation is 13.7 inches (350 mm) a year, with average monthly amounts peaking in the summer, particularly in the more rugged north-central area around Albuquerque and in the south. Generally, the eastern third of the state receives the most rainfall, while the western third receives the least. Higher altitudes receive around 40 inches (1,000 mm), while the lowest elevations see as little as 8 to 10 inches (200 to 250 mm).

Climate data for New Mexico
Month	Jan	Feb	Mar	Apr	May	Jun	Jul	Aug	Sep	Oct	Nov	Dec	Year
Record high °F (°C)	89 (32)	100 (38)	103 (39)	104 (40)	114 (46)	122 (50)	116 (47)	115 (46)	113 (45)	101 (38)	97 (36)	90 (32)	122 (50)
Mean daily maximum °F (°C)	49.7 (9.8)	54.0 (12.2)	61.8 (16.6)	69.2 (20.7)	78.1 (25.6)	87.8 (31.0)	88.8 (31.6)	86.3 (30.2)	80.4 (26.9)	70.6 (21.4)	58.6 (14.8)	49.4 (9.7)	69.6 (20.9)
Mean daily minimum °F (°C)	21.7 (−5.7)	25.0 (−3.9)	30.4 (−0.9)	36.5 (2.5)	45.2 (7.3)	54.4 (12.4)	59.5 (15.3)	58.1 (14.5)	51.1 (10.6)	39.7 (4.3)	29.0 (−1.7)	22.0 (−5.6)	39.4 (4.1)
Record low °F (°C)	−57 (−49)	−50 (−46)	−34 (−37)	−45 (−43)	−2 (−19)	10 (−12)	19 (−7)	23 (−5)	8 (−13)	−15 (−26)	−38 (−39)	−47 (−44)	−57 (−49)
Average precipitation inches (mm)	0.67 (17)	0.59 (15)	0.69 (18)	0.62 (16)	0.91 (23)	1.02 (26)	2.44 (62)	2.33 (59)	1.76 (45)	1.17 (30)	0.68 (17)	0.81 (21)	13.69 (349)
Source 1: Extreme Weather Watch
Source 2: NOAA

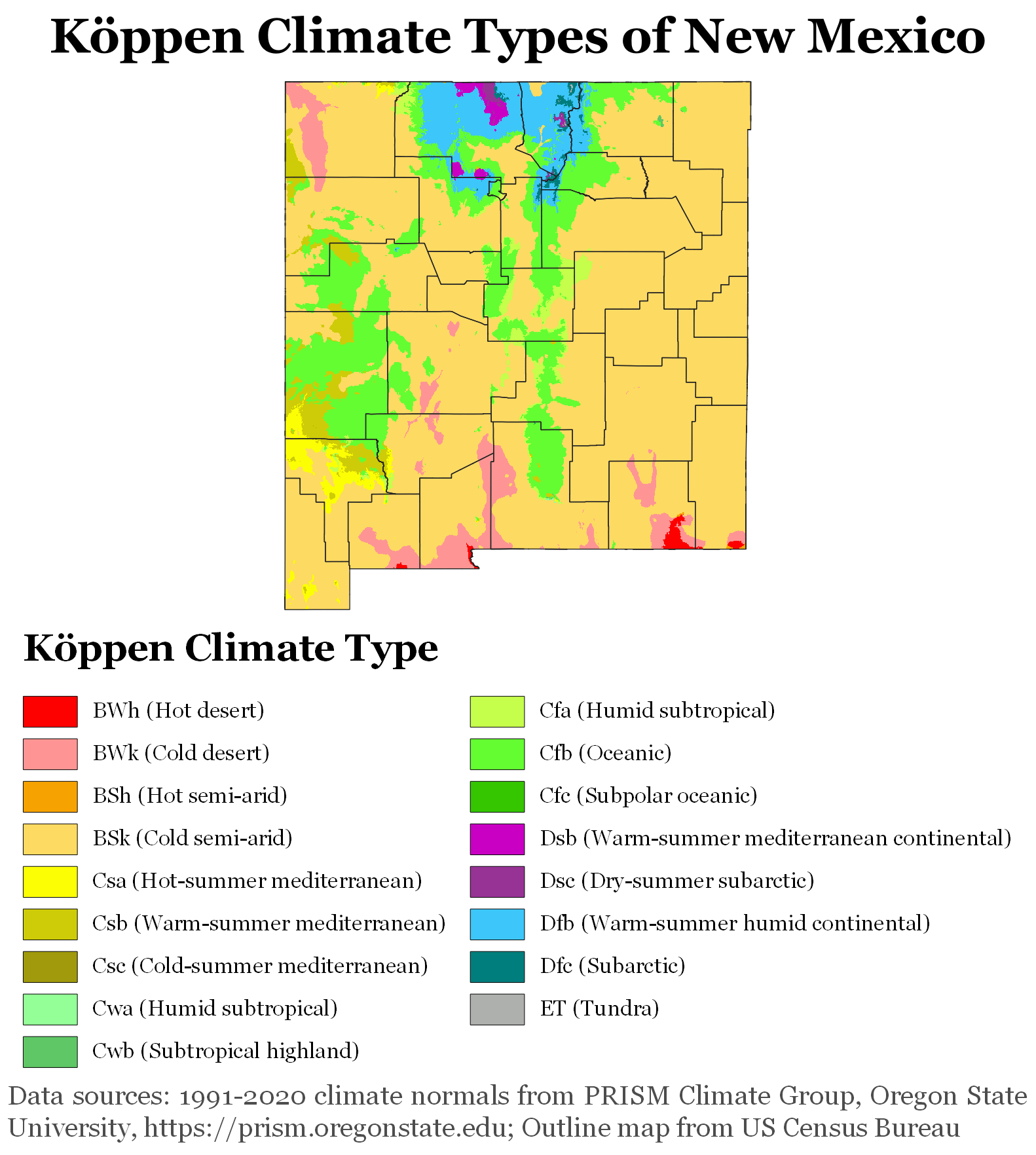
Köppen climate types of New Mexico, using 1991–2020 climate normals

Annual temperatures can range from 65 °F (18 °C) in the southeast to below 40 °F (4 °C) in the northern mountains, with the average being the mid-50s °F (12 °C). During the summer, daytime temperatures can often exceed 100 °F (38 °C) at elevations below 5,000 feet (1,500 m); the average high temperature in July ranges from 99 °F (37 °C) at the lower elevations down to 78 °F (26 °C) at the higher elevations. In the colder months of November to March, many cities in New Mexico can have nighttime temperature lows in the teens above zero, or lower. The highest temperature recorded in New Mexico was 122 °F (50 °C) at the Waste Isolation Pilot Plant (WIPP) near Loving on June 27, 1994; the lowest recorded temperature is −57 °F (−49 °C) at Ciniza (near Jamestown) on January 13, 1963.

New Mexico's stable climate and sparse population provides for clearer skies and less light pollution, making it a popular site for several major astronomical observatories, including the Apache Point Observatory, the Very Large Array, and the Magdalena Ridge Observatory, among others.

=== Flora and fauna ===
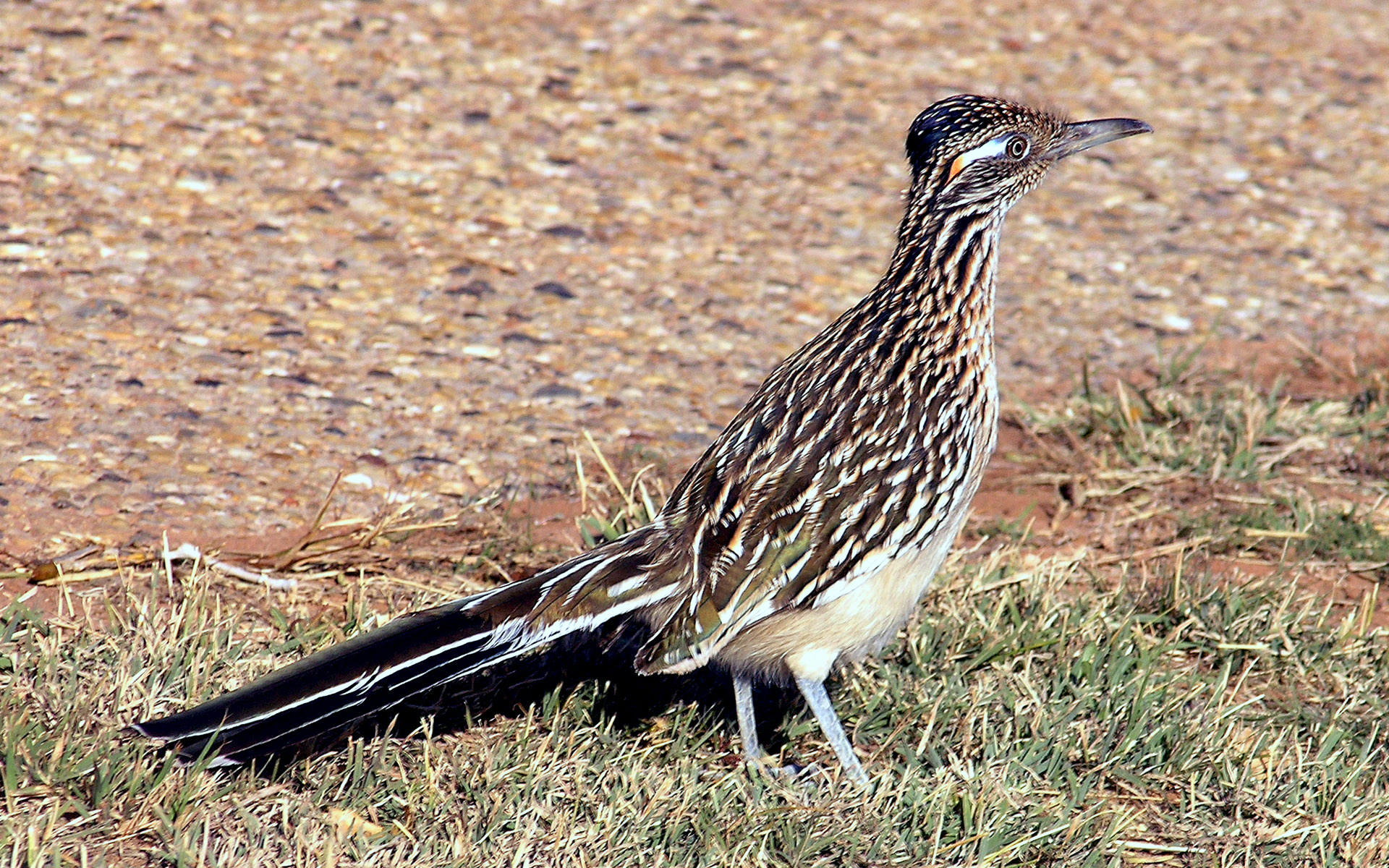
Greater roadrunner (the state bird of New Mexico)

Owing to its varied topography, New Mexico has six distinct vegetation zones that provide diverse sets of habitats for many plants and animals. The Upper Sonoran Zone is by far the most prominent, constituting about three-fourths of the state; it includes most of the plains, foothills, and valleys above 4,500 feet (1,400 meters), and is defined by prairie grasses, low piñon pines, and juniper shrubs. The Llano Estacado in the east features Shortgrass Prairie with blue grama, which sustain bison. The Chihuahuan Desert in the south is characterized by shrubby creosote. The Colorado Plateau in the northwest corner of New Mexico is high desert with cold winters, featuring sagebrush, shadescale, greasewood, and other plants adapted to the saline and seleniferous soil.

The mountainous north hosts a wide array of vegetation types corresponding to elevation gradients, such as piñon-juniper woodlands near the base, through evergreen conifers, spruce-fir and aspen forests in the transitionary zone, and Krummholz, and alpine tundra at the very top. The Apachian zone tucked into the southwestern bootheel of the state has high-calcium soil, oak woodlands, Arizona cypress, and other plants that are not found in other parts of the state. The southern sections of the Rio Grande and Pecos valleys have 20,000 square miles (52,000 km^{2}) of New Mexico's best grazing land and irrigated farmland.

New Mexico's varied climate and vegetation zones consequently support diverse wildlife. Black bears, bighorn sheep, bobcats, cougars, deer, and elk live in habitats above 7,000 feet (2,100 meters), while coyotes, jackrabbits, kangaroo rats, javelina, porcupines, pronghorn antelope, western diamondbacks, and wild turkeys live in less mountainous and elevated regions. The iconic roadrunner, which is the state bird, is abundant in the southeast. Endangered species include the Mexican gray wolf, which is being gradually reintroduced in the world, and Rio Grande silvery minnow. Over 500 species of birds live or migrate through New Mexico, third only to California and Mexico.

=== Public lands ===
New Mexico and 12 other western states together account for 93% of all federally owned land in the U.S. Roughly a third of the state, or 24.7 million of 77.8 million acres, is held by the U.S. government, the tenth-highest proportion in the country. More than half this land is under the Bureau of Land Management as either public domain land or National Conservation Lands, while another third is managed by the U.S. Forest Service as national forests.

New Mexico was central to the early–20th-century conservation movement, with the Gila Wilderness designated as the world's first wilderness area in 1924. The state also hosts nine of the country's 84 national monuments, the most of any state after Arizona; these include the second oldest monument, El Morro, created in 1906, and the Gila Cliff Dwellings, proclaimed in 1907.

==== National forests in New Mexico ====
Carson National Forest
Cibola National Forest
Lincoln National Forest
Santa Fe National Forest
Gila National Forest
Gila Wilderness
Coronado National Forest (in Hidalgo County)

==== National parks in New Mexico ====
New Mexico's national parks, together with national monuments and trails managed by the National Park Service, are listed as follows:

- Aztec Ruins National Monument at Aztec
- Bandelier National Monument at White Rock
- Butterfield Overland National Historic Trail
- Capulin Volcano National Monument near Capulin
- Carlsbad Caverns National Park near Carlsbad
- Chaco Culture National Historical Park at Nageezi
- El Camino Real de Tierra Adentro National Historic Trail
- El Malpais National Monument near Grants
- El Morro National Monument in Ramah
- Fort Union National Monument at Watrous
- Gila Cliff Dwellings National Monument near Silver City
- Manhattan Project National Historical Park in Los Alamos
- Old Spanish National Historic Trail
- Pecos National Historical Park in Pecos
- Petroglyph National Monument near Albuquerque
- Salinas Pueblo Missions National Monument at Mountainair
- Santa Fe National Historic Trail
- Valles Caldera National Preserve in the Jemez Mountains
- White Sands National Park near Alamogordo

==== National conservation lands in New Mexico ====
New Mexico's national monuments, conservation areas, and other units of the National Landscape Conservation System are managed by the Bureau of Land Management. Units include but are not limited to:

- Bisti/De-Na-Zin Wilderness near Farmington
- El Camino Real de Tierra Adentro National Historic Trail
- El Malpais National Conservation Area near Grants
- Kasha-Katuwe Tent Rocks National Monument in Cochiti Pueblo
- Prehistoric Trackways National Monument near Las Cruces
- Old Spanish National Historic Trail
- Organ Mountains-Desert Peaks National Monument near Las Cruces
- Rio Grande del Norte National Monument near Taos
- Rio Chama Wild and Scenic River near Abiquiu
- Rio Grande and Red River Wild and Scenic Rivers near Questa

==== National wildlife refuges in New Mexico ====
New Mexico's National Wildlife Refuges are managed by the U.S. Fish and Wildlife Service. Units include:

- Bitter Lake National Wildlife Refuge
- Bosque del Apache National Wildlife Refuge
- Grulla National Wildlife Refuge
- Las Vegas National Wildlife Refuge
- Maxwell National Wildlife Refuge
- San Andres National Wildlife Refuge
- Sevilleta National Wildlife Refuge
- Valle de Oro National Wildlife Refuge

==== State parks in New Mexico ====
Areas managed by the New Mexico State Parks Division: (Note: Vietnam Veterans Memorial was a state park until 2017, when it was transferred to the Department of Veteran Services in 2017. Vietnam Veterans Memorial State Park | Angel Fire, NM 87045. (newmexico.org).)

- Bluewater Lake State Park
- Bottomless Lakes State Park
- Brantley Lake State Park
- Cerrillos Hills State Park
- Caballo Lake State Park
- Cimarron Canyon State Park
- City of Rocks State Park
- Clayton Lake State Park
- Conchas Lake State Park
- Coyote Creek State Park
- Eagle Nest Lake State Park
- Elephant Butte Lake State Park
- El Vado Lake State Park
- Heron Lake State Park
- Hyde Memorial State Park
- Leasburg Dam State Park
- Living Desert Zoo and Gardens State Park
- Manzano Mountains State Park
- Mesilla Valley Bosque State Park
- Morphy Lake State Park
- Navajo Lake (Rio Arriba, NM and San Juan, NM)
- Oasis State Park
- Oliver Lee Memorial State Park
- Pancho Villa State Park
- Percha Dam State Park
- Rio Grande Nature Center State Park
- Rio Grande Valley State Park
- Rockhound State Park
- Santa Rosa Lake State Park
- Storrie Lake State Park
- Sugarite Canyon State Park
- Sumner Lake State Park
- Fenton Lake State Park
- Ute Lake State Park
- Villanueva State Park

==== Other nature reserves in New Mexico ====
Examples of locally administered nature reserves include:

- Whitfield Wildlife Conservation Area in Valencia County
- Albuquerque Open Space, see Open Space Visitor Center

=== Environmental issues ===
In January 2016, New Mexico sued the United States Environmental Protection Agency over negligence after the 2015 Gold King Mine waste water spill. The spill had caused heavy metals such as cadmium and lead, and toxins such as arsenic, to flow into the Animas River, polluting several states' water basins. The state has since implemented or considered stricter regulations and harsher penalties for spills associated with resource extraction.

New Mexico is a major producer of greenhouse gases. A Colorado State University study found that the state's oil and gas industry generated 60 million metric tons of greenhouse gases in 2018, over four times more than previously estimated. The fossil fuels sector accounted for over half the state's overall emissions, which totaled 113.6 million metric tons, about 1.8% of the country's total and more than twice the national average per capita. The New Mexico government has responded with efforts to regulate industrial emissions, promote renewable energy, and incentivize the use of electric vehicles.

=== Settlements ===
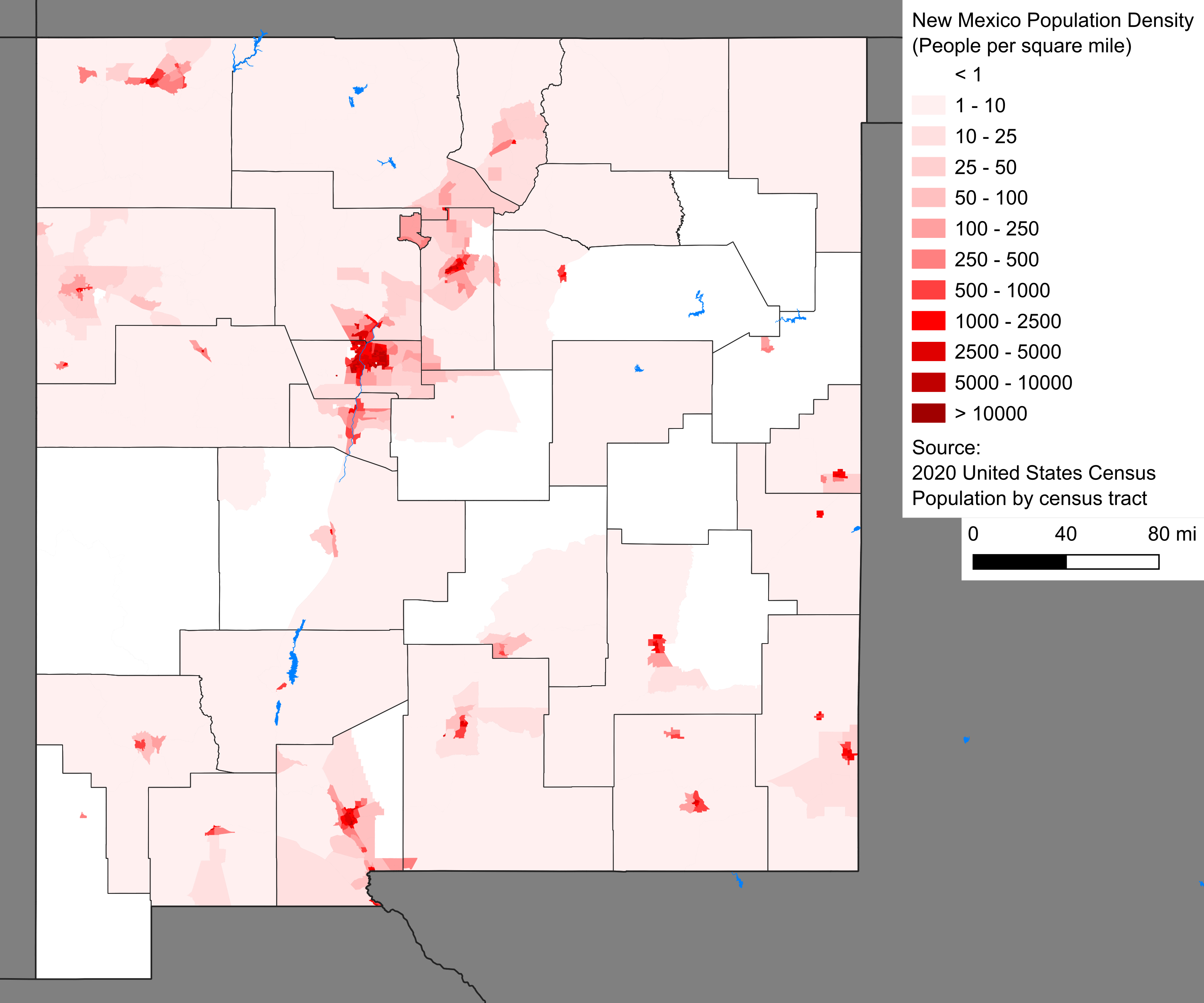
New Mexico population density map

With just 17 people per square mile (6.6 people/km^{2}), New Mexico is one of the least densely populated states, ranking 45th out of 50; the population density of the U.S. overall is 90 people per square mile (35 people/km^{2}). The state has 33 counties and 106 municipalities, which include cities, towns, villages, and a consolidated city-county, Los Alamos. Only three cities have at least 100,000 residents: Albuquerque, Rio Rancho, and Las Cruces, whose respective metropolitan areas together account for the majority of New Mexico's population.

Residents are concentrated in the north-central region, anchored by the state's largest city, Albuquerque. Centered in Bernalillo County, the Albuquerque metropolitan area includes New Mexico's third-largest city, Rio Rancho, and has a population of over 918,000, accounting for one-third of all New Mexicans. It is adjacent to Santa Fe, the capital and fourth-largest city. Altogether, the Albuquerque–Santa Fe–Los Alamos combined statistical area includes more than 1.17 million people, nearly 60% of the state population.

New Mexico's other major center of population is in the south-central area around Las Cruces, its second-largest city and the largest city in the state's southern region. The Las Cruces metropolitan area has roughly 214,000 residents, and with neighboring El Paso, Texas, forms a combined statistical area numbering over 1 million.

New Mexico hosts 23 federally recognized tribal reservations, including part of the Navajo Nation, the largest and most populous tribe; of these, 11 hold off-reservation trust lands elsewhere in the state. The vast majority of federally recognized tribes are concentrated in the northwest, followed by the north-central region.

Like several other southwestern states, New Mexico has numerous colonias—unincorporated, low-income slums characterized by abject poverty, absence of basic services (such as water and sewage), and scarce housing and infrastructure. The University of New Mexico estimates there are 118 colonias in the state, though the U.S. Department of Housing and Urban Development identifies roughly 150. Most are along the Mexico–United States border.

Largest cities or towns in New Mexico Source: 2023 U.S. Census Bureau estimate
Rank	Name	County	Pop.
1	Albuquerque	Bernalillo	560,274
2	Las Cruces	Doña Ana	114,892
3	Rio Rancho	Sandoval / Bernalillo	110,660
4	Santa Fe	Santa Fe	89,167
5	Roswell	Chaves	47,109
6	Farmington	San Juan	46,237
7	Hobbs	Lea	39,386
8	Clovis	Curry	37,612
9	Carlsbad	Eddy	31,499
10	Alamogordo	Otero	31,284

== Demographics ==
=== Population ===
Historical population
Census	Pop.	Note	%±
1850	61,547		—
1860	93,516		51.9%
1870	91,874		−1.8%
1880	119,565		30.1%
1890	160,282		34.1%
1900	195,310		21.9%
1910	327,301		67.6%
1920	360,350		10.1%
1930	423,317		17.5%
1940	531,818		25.6%
1950	681,187		28.1%
1960	951,023		39.6%
1970	1,016,000		6.8%
1980	1,302,894		28.2%
1990	1,515,069		16.3%
2000	1,819,046		20.1%
2010	2,059,179		13.2%
2020	2,117,522		2.8%
2025 (est.)	2,125,498		0.4%
Source: 1910–2020

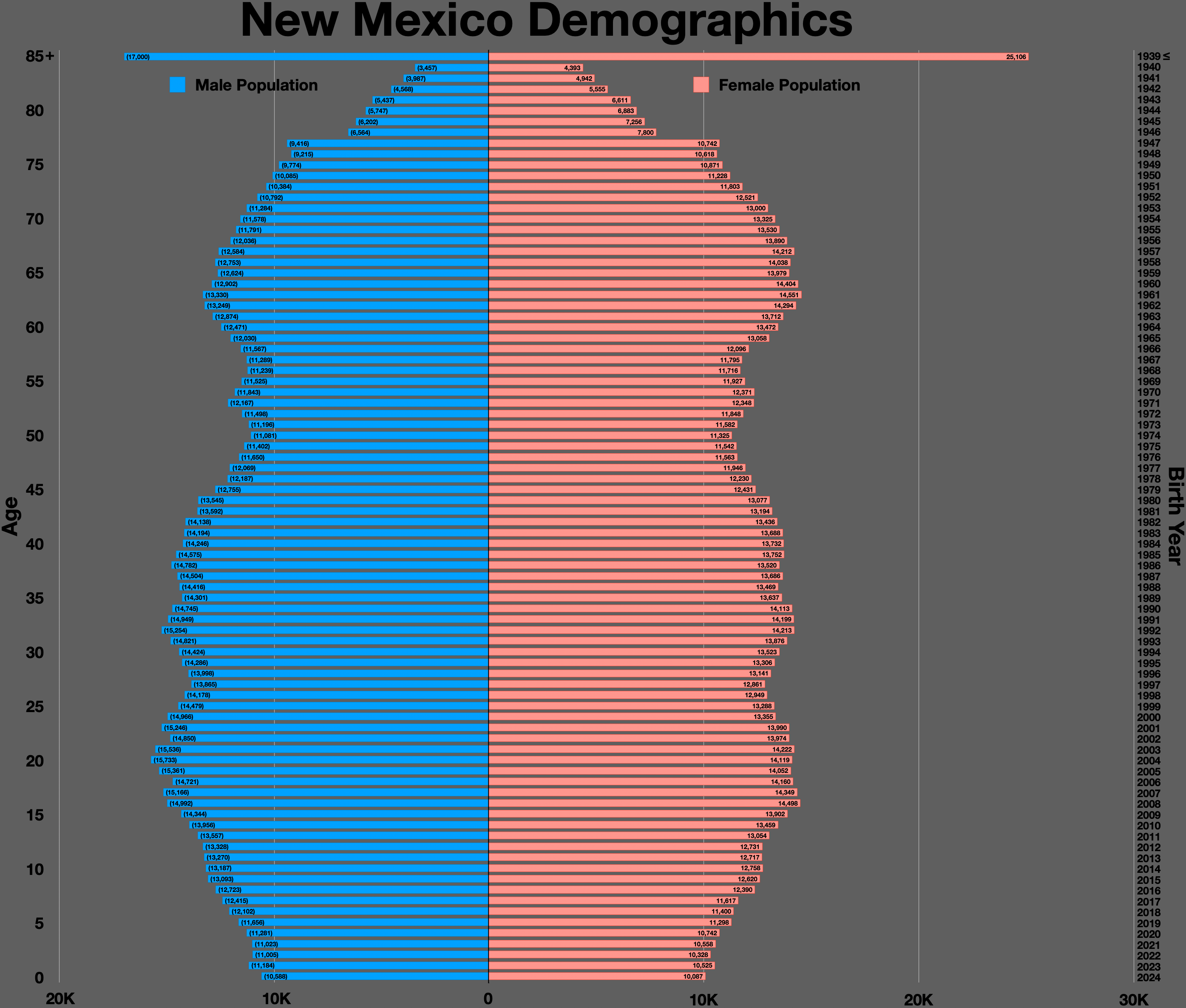
New Mexico population pyramid

The 2020 census recorded a population of 2,117,522, an increase of 2.8% from 2,059,179 in the 2010 census. This was the lowest rate of growth in the western U.S. after Wyoming, and among the slowest nationwide. By comparison, between 2000 and 2010, New Mexico's population had increased by 11.7% from 1,819,046—a faster rate than the national average. A report commissioned in 2021 by the New Mexico Legislature attributed the state's slow growth to a negative net migration rate, particularly among those 18 or younger, and to a 19% decline in the birth rate. However, growth among Hispanics and Native Americans remained healthy. (Note: "Even though New Mexico's under-18 population shrank by 8.3%, the analysts found that the Hispanic population increased slightly and the Native American population grew by 10%, signaling long-term growth in diversity.")

The U.S. Census Bureau estimated a slight decrease in population, with 3,333 fewer people from July 2021 to July 2022. This was attributed to deaths exceeding births by roughly 5,000, with net migration mitigating the loss by 1,389.

More than half of New Mexicans (51.4%) were born in the state; 37.9% were born in another state; 1.1% were born in either Puerto Rico, an island territory, or abroad to at least one American parent; and 9.4% were foreign born (compared to a national average of roughly 12%). Almost a quarter of the population (22.7%) was under the age of 18, and the state's median age of 38.4 is slightly above the national average of 38.2. New Mexico's somewhat older population is partly reflective of its popularity among retirees: It ranked as the most popular retirement destination in 2018, with an estimated 42% of new residents being retired.

Hispanics and Latinos constitute nearly half of all residents (49.3%), giving New Mexico the highest proportion of Hispanic ancestry among the fifty states. This broad classification includes descendants of Spanish colonists who settled between the 16th and 18th centuries, as well as recent immigrants from Latin America (particularly Mexico and Central America).

From 2000 to 2010, the number of persons in poverty increased to 400,779, or approximately one-fifth of the population. The 2020 census recorded a slightly reduced poverty rate of 18.2%, albeit the third highest among U.S. states, compared to a national average of 10.5%. Poverty disproportionately affects minorities, with about one-third of African Americans and Native Americans living in poverty, compared with less than a fifth of whites and roughly a tenth of Asians; likewise, New Mexico ranks 49th among states for education equality by race and 32nd for its racial gap in income.

New Mexico's population is among the most difficult to count, according to the Center for Urban Research at the City University of New York, due to the state's size, sparse population, and numerous isolated communities. Likewise, the Census Bureau estimated that roughly 43% of the state's population (about 900,000 people) live in such "hard-to-count" areas. In response, the New Mexico government invested heavily in public outreach to increase census participation, resulting in a final tally that exceeded earlier estimates and outperformed several neighboring states.

According to HUD's 2022 Annual Homeless Assessment Report, there were an estimated 2,560 homeless people in New Mexico.

=== Race and ethnicity ===
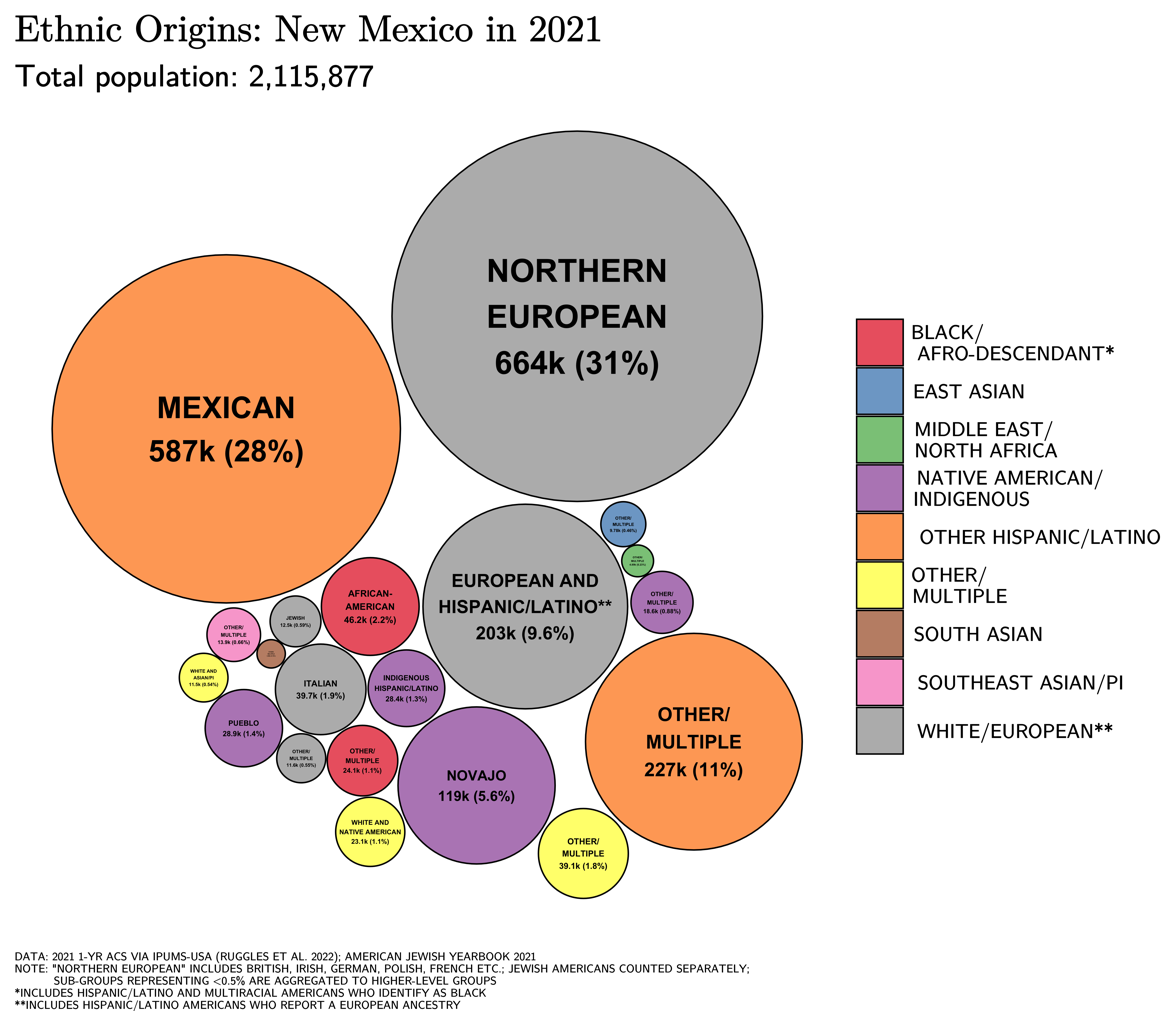
Largest alone or in any combination ethnic origin by county in New Mexico, per the 2020 census

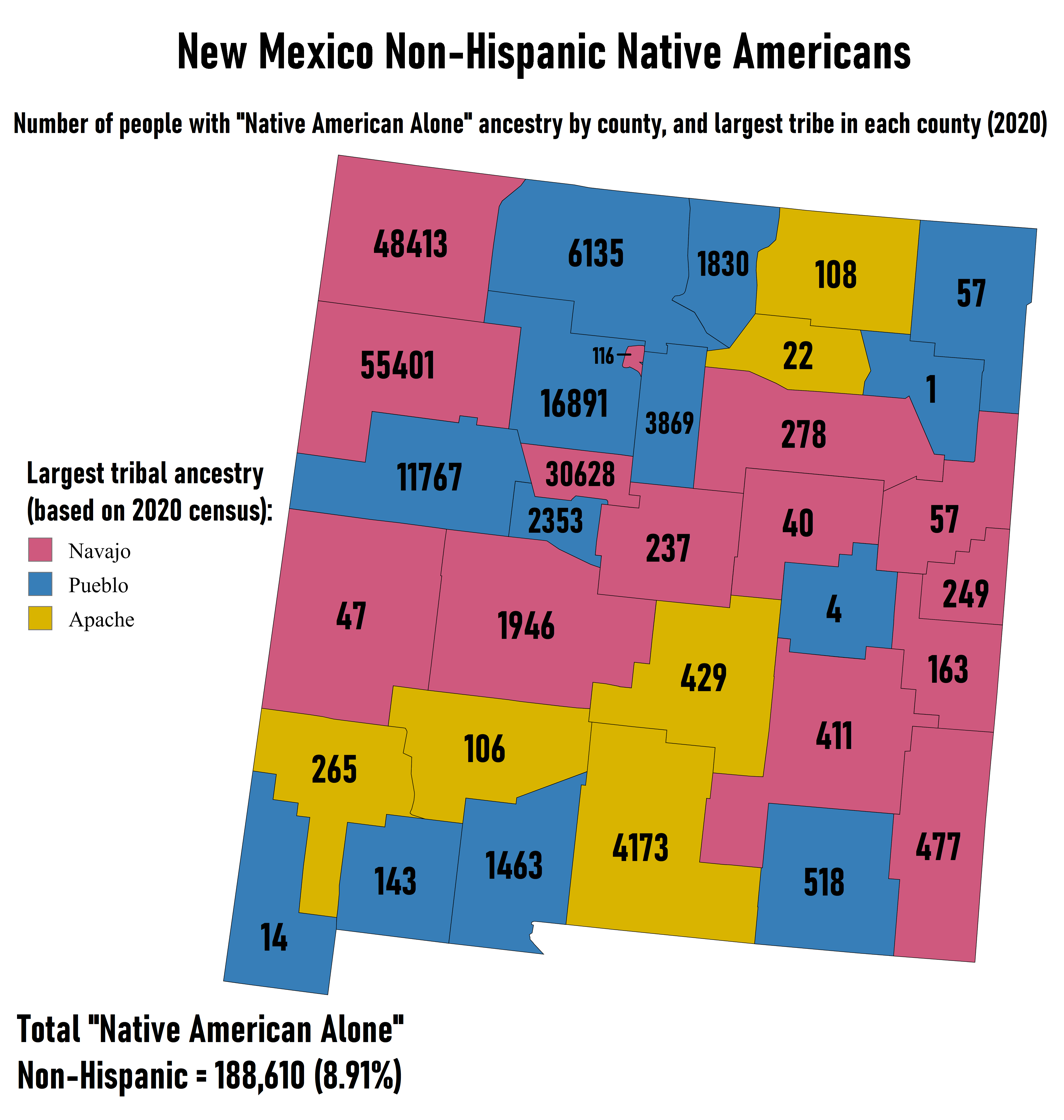
Largest Non-Hispanic Native American ancestry by county and numbers of people reporting "Native American Alone"

New Mexico is one of seven "majority-minority" states where non-Hispanic whites constitute less than half the population. As early as 1940, roughly half the population was estimated to be nonwhite. Before becoming a state in 1912, New Mexico was among the few U.S. territories that were predominantly nonwhite, which contributed to its delayed admission into the Union.

The largest ethnic group is Hispanic and Latino Americans; according to the 2020 census they account for nearly half the state's population, at 47.7%; they include Hispanos descended from pre-United States settlers and more recent successions of Mexican Americans.

Some 200,000 residents, about one-tenth of the population, are of Indigenous descent, ranking third in size, and second proportionally, among all states nationwide. There are 23 federally recognized tribal nations, each with its distinct culture, history, and identity. Both the Navajo and Apache share Athabaskan origin, with the latter living on three federal reservations in the state. The Navajo Nation, which spans over 16 million acres (6.5 million ha), mostly in neighboring Arizona, is the largest reservation in the U.S., with one-third of its members living in New Mexico. Pueblo Indians, who share a similar lifestyle but are culturally and linguistically distinct, live in 19 pueblos scattered throughout the state, which collectively span over 2 million acres (800,000 ha). Many indigenous New Mexicans have moved to urban areas throughout the state, and some cities such as Gallup are major hubs of Native American culture. New Mexico is also a hub for indigenous communities beyond its borders: the annual Gathering of Nations, which began in 1983, has been described as the largest pow wow in the U.S., drawing hundreds of native tribes from across North America.

Almost half of New Mexicans claim Hispanic origin; many are descendants of colonial settlers called Hispanos or Nuevomexicanos, who settled mostly in the north of the state between the 16th and 18th centuries; by contrast, the majority of Mexican immigrants reside in the south. Some Hispanos claim Jewish ancestry through descendance from conversos or Crypto-Jews among early Spanish colonists. Many New Mexicans speak a unique dialect known as New Mexican Spanish, which was shaped by the region's historical isolation and various cultural influences; New Mexican Spanish lacks certain vocabulary from other Spanish dialects and uses numerous Native American words for local features, as well as anglicized words that express American concepts and modern inventions.

New Mexico has the fourth-largest Native American community in the U.S., at over 200,000; comprising roughly one-tenth of all residents, this is the second-largest population by percentage after Alaska. New Mexico is also the only state besides Alaska where indigenous people have maintained a stable proportion of the population for over a century: In 1890, Native Americans made up 9.4% of New Mexico's population, almost the same percentage as in 2020. By contrast, during that same period, neighboring Arizona went from one-third indigenous to less than 5%.

New Mexico's population consists of many mestizo Indo-Hispano groups, including Hispanos of Oasisamerican descent and Indigenous Mexican American with Mesoamerican ancestry.

Counties in New Mexico by racial plurality, per the 2020 U.S. census Legend: | Non-Hispanic White 40–50% 50–60% 60–70% 70–80% Native American 40–50% 80–90% | Hispanic or Latino 40–50% 50–60% 60–70% 70–80% |

In the 2020 Census, 45,904 New Mexico residents were identified as African American (2.2% of the total). African Americans in the five counties of Bernalillo (21,344), Doña Ana (4,072), Sandoval (3,327), Curry (2,900), and Lea (2,801) make up more than 75% of all African Americans in the state.

New Mexico Racial Breakdown of Population
Racial composition	1970	1990	2000	2010	2020
Hispanic or Latino	37.4%	38.2%	42.1%	46.3%	47.7%
White (non-Hispanic)	53.8%	50.4%	44.7%	40.5%	36.5%
Native	7.2%	8.9%	9.5%	9.4%	10.0%
Black	1.9%	2.0%	1.9%	2.1%	2.1%
Asian	0.2%	0.9%	1.1%	1.4%	1.8%
Native Hawaiian and other Pacific Islander	–	–	0.1%	0.1%	0.1%
Other	0.6%	12.6%	17.0%	15.0%	15.0%
Two or more races	–	–	3.6%	3.7%	19.9%

New Mexico – Racial and ethnic composition Note: the U.S. Census treats Hispanic/Latino as an ethnic category. This table excludes Latinos from the racial categories and assigns them to a separate category. Hispanics/Latinos may be of any race.
Race / Ethnicity (NH = Non-Hispanic)	Pop 2000	Pop 2010	Pop 2020	% 2000	% 2010	% 2020
White alone (NH)	813,495	833,810	772,952	44.72%	40.49%	36.50%
Black or African American alone (NH)	30,654	35,462	38,330	1.69%	1.72%	1.81%
Native American or Alaska Native alone (NH)	161,460	175,368	188,610	8.88%	8.52%	8.91%
Asian alone (NH)	18,257	26,305	35,261	1.00%	1.28%	1.67%
Pacific Islander alone (NH)	992	1,246	1,451	0.05%	0.06%	0.07%
Other race alone (NH)	3,009	3,750	10,340	0.17%	0.18%	0.49%
Mixed race or Multiracial (NH)	25,793	29,835	59,767	1.42%	1.45%	2.82%
Hispanic or Latino (any race)	765,386	953,403	1,010,811	42.08%	46.30%	47.74%
Total	1,819,046	2,059,179	2,117,522	100.00%	100.00%	100.00%

According to the 2022 American Community Survey, the most commonly claimed ancestry groups in New Mexico were:

- Mexican (32.8%)
- Other Hispanic (Hispano/Spanish) (15.3%)
- English (8.0%)
- German (7.9%)
- Irish (6.4%)
- Diné (6.3%)
- Pueblo (2.4%)

According to 2020 census data, 19.9% of the population identifies as multiracial/mixed-race, a population larger than the Native American, Black, Asian and NHPI population groups. Almost 90% of the multiracial population in New Mexico identifies as Hispanic or Latino.

Birth data

The majority of live births in New Mexico are to Hispanic whites, with Hispanics of any race consistently accounting for over half of all live births since 2013.

Live births by single race/ethnicity of mother
Race	2014	2015	2016	2017	2018	2019	2020	2021	2022	2023	2024
White	7,222 (27.7%)	7,157 (27.7%)	7,004 (28.4%)	6,522 (27.4%)	6,450 (28.0%)	6,218 (27.1%)	5,872 (26.8%)	5,754 (26.9%)	5,531 (25.6%)	5,232 (25.0%)	5,311 (24.9%)
American Indian	3,581 (13.7%)	3,452 (13.4%)	2,827 (11.4%)	2,694 (11.3%)	2,603 (11.3%)	2,643 (11.5%)	2,434 (11.1%)	2,152 (10.1%)	2,221 (10.3%)	2,063 (9.8%)	2,097 (9.8%)
Asian	578 (2.2%)	517 (2.0%)	425 (1.7%)	420 (1.8%)	409 (1.8%)	392 (1.7%)	410 (1.8%)	351 (1.6%)	412 (1.9%)	393 (1.9%)	403 (1.9%)
Black	732 (2.8%)	664 (2.6%)	354 (1.4%)	387 (1.6%)	387 (1.7%)	355 (1.5%)	403 (1.8%)	372 (1.7%)	403 (1.9%)	381 (1.8%)	362 (1.7%)
Hispanic (any race)	14,449 (55.5%)	14,431 (55.9%)	13,639 (55.2%)	13,362 (56.2%)	12,783 (55.4%)	12,924 (56.3%)	12,406 (56.6%)	12,354 (57.7%)	12,617 (58.4%)	12,461 (59.5%)	12,640 (59.3%)
Total	26,052 (100%)	25,816 (100%)	24,692 (100%)	23,767 (100%)	23,039 (100%)	22,960 (100%)	21,903 (100%)	21,391 (100%)	21,614 (100%)	20,951 (100%)	21,328 (100%)

=== Immigration ===
A little over 9% of New Mexican residents are foreign-born, and an additional 6.0% of U.S.-born residents live with at least one immigrant parent. The proportion of foreign-born residents is below the national average of 13.7%, and New Mexico was the only state to see a decline in its immigrant population between 2012 and 2022.

In 2018, the top countries of origin for New Mexico's immigrants were Mexico, the Philippines, India, Germany and Cuba. As of 2021, the vast majority of immigrants in the state came from Mexico (67.6%), followed by the Philippines (3.1%) and Germany (2.4%).

Notwithstanding their relatively small population, immigrants play a disproportionately large role in New Mexico's economy, accounting for almost one-eighth (12.5%) of the labor force,15% of entrepreneurs, and 19.1% of personal care aides, as well as 9.1% of workers in STEM fields.

=== Languages ===
Languages spoken in New Mexico
English only	64%
Spanish	28%
Navajo	4%
Others	4%

New Mexico ranks third after California and Texas in the number of multilingual residents. According to the 2010 U.S. census, 28.5% of the population age 5 and older speak Spanish at home, while 3.5% speak Navajo. Most speakers of New Mexican Spanish are descendants of pre-18th century Spanish settlers. Contrary to popular belief, New Mexican Spanish is not an archaic form of 17th-century Castilian Spanish; though some archaic elements exist, linguistic research has determined that the dialect "is neither more Iberian nor more archaic" than other varieties spoken in the Americas. Nevertheless, centuries of isolation during the colonial period insulated the New Mexican dialect from "standard" Spanish, leading to the preservation of older vocabulary as well as its own innovations.

Besides Navajo, which is also spoken in Arizona, several other Native American languages are spoken by smaller groups in New Mexico, most of which are endemic to the state. Native New Mexican languages include Mescalero Apache, Jicarilla Apache, Tewa, Southern Tiwa, Northern Tiwa, Towa, Keres (Eastern and Western), and Zuni. Mescalero and Jicarilla Apache are closely related Southern Athabaskan languages, and both are also related to Navajo. Tewa, the Tiwa languages, and Towa belong to the Kiowa-Tanoan language family, and thus all descend from a common ancestor. Keres and Zuni are language isolates with no relatives outside of New Mexico.

==== Official language ====
New Mexico's original state constitution of 1911 required all laws be published in both English and Spanish for twenty years after ratification; this requirement was renewed in 1931 and 1943, with some sources stating the state was officially bilingual until 1953. Nonetheless, the current constitution does not declare any language "official". While Spanish was permitted in the legislature until 1935, all state officials are required to have good knowledge of English; consequently, some analysts argue that New Mexico cannot be considered a bilingual state, since not all laws are published in both languages.

The state legislature remains constitutionally empowered to publish laws in English and Spanish and to appropriate funds for translation. Whenever a referendum to approve an amendment to the New Mexican constitution is held, ballots must be printed in both English and Spanish. Certain legal notices must be published in both English and Spanish, and the state maintains a list of newspapers for Spanish publication.

In the judiciary, witnesses and defendants have the right to testify in either language, and monolingual speakers of Spanish have the same right to serve on juries as English speakers. In public education, the state is constitutionally obligated to provide bilingual education and Spanish-speaking instructors in school districts where the majority of students are Hispanophone. The constitution also provides that citizens who speak neither English nor Spanish have a right to vote, hold public office, and serve on juries.

In 1989, New Mexico became the first of only four states to officially adopt the English Plus resolution, which supports acceptance of non-English languages. In 1995, the state adopted an official bilingual song, "New Mexico – Mi Lindo Nuevo México". In 2008, New Mexico was the first state to officially adopt a Navajo textbook for use in public schools.

=== Religion ===
Religious self-identification, per Public Religion Research Institute's 2025 American Values Survey
1. Protestantism (34.0%)
2. Catholicism (25.0%)
3. Mormonism (1.00%)
4. Unaffiliated (33.0%)
5. Judaism (1.00%)
6. Other (6.00%)

Like most U.S. states, New Mexico is predominantly Christian. According to Association of Religion Data Archives (ARDA), the largest denominations in 2010 were the Catholic Church (684,941 members); the Southern Baptist Convention (113,452); The Church of Jesus Christ of Latter-day Saints (67,637), and the United Methodist Church (36,424). Approximately one-fifth of residents are unaffiliated with any religion, which includes atheists, agnostics, and deists. A 2020 study by the Public Religion Research Institute (PRRI) determined 67% of the population were Christian, with Roman Catholics constituting the largest denominational group. In 2025, the PRRI estimated 62% of the population were Christian, with Protestants now having become the largest denominational group.

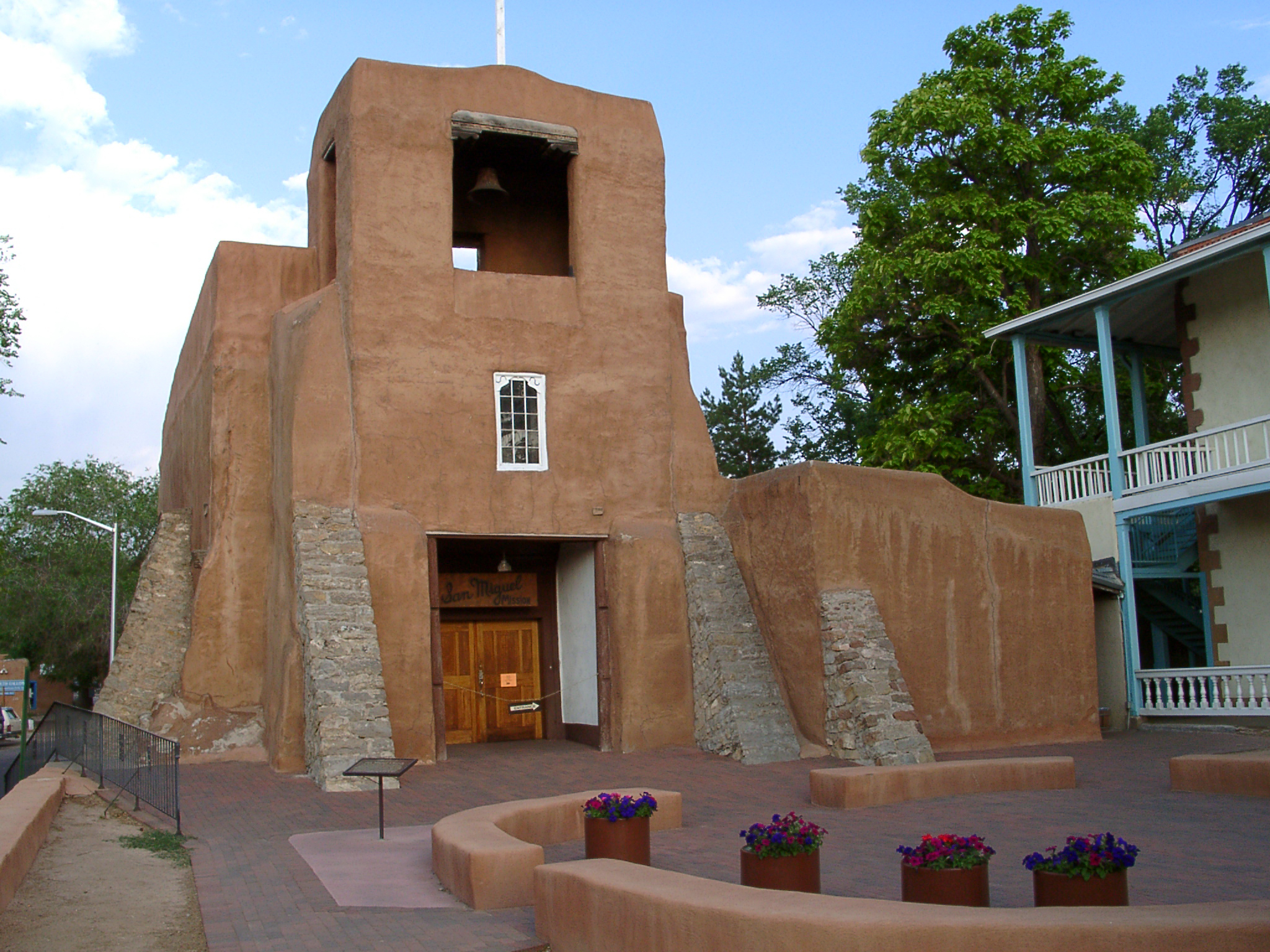
San Miguel Chapel, built in 1610 in Santa Fe, is the oldest church structure in the continental U.S.

Roman Catholicism is deeply rooted in New Mexico's history and culture, going back to its settlement by the Spanish in the early 17th century. The oldest Christian church in the continental U.S., and the third oldest in any U.S. state or territory, is the San Miguel Mission in Santa Fe, which was built in 1610. Within the hierarchy of the Catholic Church, New Mexico belongs to the ecclesiastical province of Santa Fe. The state has three ecclesiastical districts: the Archdiocese of Santa Fe, the Diocese of Gallup, and the Diocese of Las Cruces. Evangelicalism and nondenominational Christianity have seen growth in the state since the late 20th century: The Billy Graham Evangelistic Association has hosted numerous events in New Mexico, and Albuquerque has several megachurches, which have numerous satellite locations in the state, including Calvary of Albuquerque, Legacy Church, and Sagebrush Church.

New Mexico has been a leading center of the New Age movement since at least the 1960s, attracting adherents from across the country. The state's "thriving New Age network" encompasses various schools of alternative medicine, Holistic Health, psychic healing, and new religions, as well as festivals, pilgrimage sites, spiritual retreats, and communes. New Mexico's Japanese American community has influenced the state's religious heritage, with Shinto and Zen represented by Kagyu Shenpen Kunchab, Kōbun Chino Otogawa, Upaya Institute and Zen Center. Likewise, Holism is represented in New Mexico, as are associated faiths such as Buddhism and Seventh-day Adventism; a Tibetan Buddhist temple is located at Zuni Mountain Stupa in Grants.

Religious education, art, broadcasting, media exist across religions and faiths in New Mexico, including KHAC, KXXQ, Dar al-Islam, and Intermountain Jewish News. Christian schools in New Mexico are encouraged to receive educational accreditation, and among them are the University of the Southwest, St. Pius High School, Hope Christian, Sandia View Academy, St. Michael's High School, Las Cruces Catholic School, St. Bonaventure Indian School, and Rehoboth Christian School. Albuquerque's growing media sector has made it a popular hub for several national Christian media institutions, such as Trinity Broadcasting Network's KNAT-TV. Christian artistic expression includes the gospel tradition within New Mexico music, and contemporary Christian music such as KLYT radio station. Several indigenous and Christian religious sites are registered and protected as part of regional and global cultural heritage.

Reflecting centuries of successive migrations and settlements, New Mexico has developed a distinct syncretic folk religion that is centered on Puebloan traditions and Hispano folk Catholicism, with some elements of Diné Bahaneʼ, Apache, Protestant, and Evangelical faiths. This unique religious tradition is sometimes referred to as "Pueblo Christianity" or "Placita Christianity", referring to both the Pueblos and Hispanic town squares. Customs and practices include the maintenance of acequias, Pueblo and Territorial Style churches, ceremonial dances such as the matachines, religious artistic expression of kachinas and santos, religious holidays celebrating saints such as Pueblo Feast Days, Christmas traditions of bizcochitos and farolitos or luminarias, and pilgrimages like that of El Santuario de Chimayo. The luminaria tradition is a cultural hallmark of the Pueblos and Hispanos of New Mexico and a part of the state's distinct heritage. The luminaria custom has spread nationwide, both as a Christmas tradition as well as for other events. New Mexico's distinctive faith tradition is believed to reflect the religious naturalism of the state's indigenous and Hispano peoples, who constitute a pseudo ethnoreligious group.

New Mexico's leadership within otherwise disparate traditions such as Christianity, the Native American Church, and New Age movements has been linked to its remote and ancient indigenous spirituality, which emphasized sacred connections to nature, and its over 300 years of syncretized Pueblo and Hispano religious and folk customs. The state's remoteness has likewise been cited as attracting and fostering communities seeking the freedom to practice or cultivate new beliefs. Global spiritual leaders including Billy Graham and Dalai Lama, along with community leaders of Hispanic and Latino Americans and indigenous peoples of the North American Southwest, have remarked on New Mexico being a sacred space.

According to a 2017 survey by the Pew Research Center, New Mexico ranks 18th among the 50 U.S. states in religiosity, 63% of respondents stating they believe in God with certainty, with an additional 20% being fairly certain of the existence of God, while 59% considering religion to be important in their lives and another 20% believe it to be somewhat important. Among its population in 2022, 31% were unaffiliated.

== Economy ==
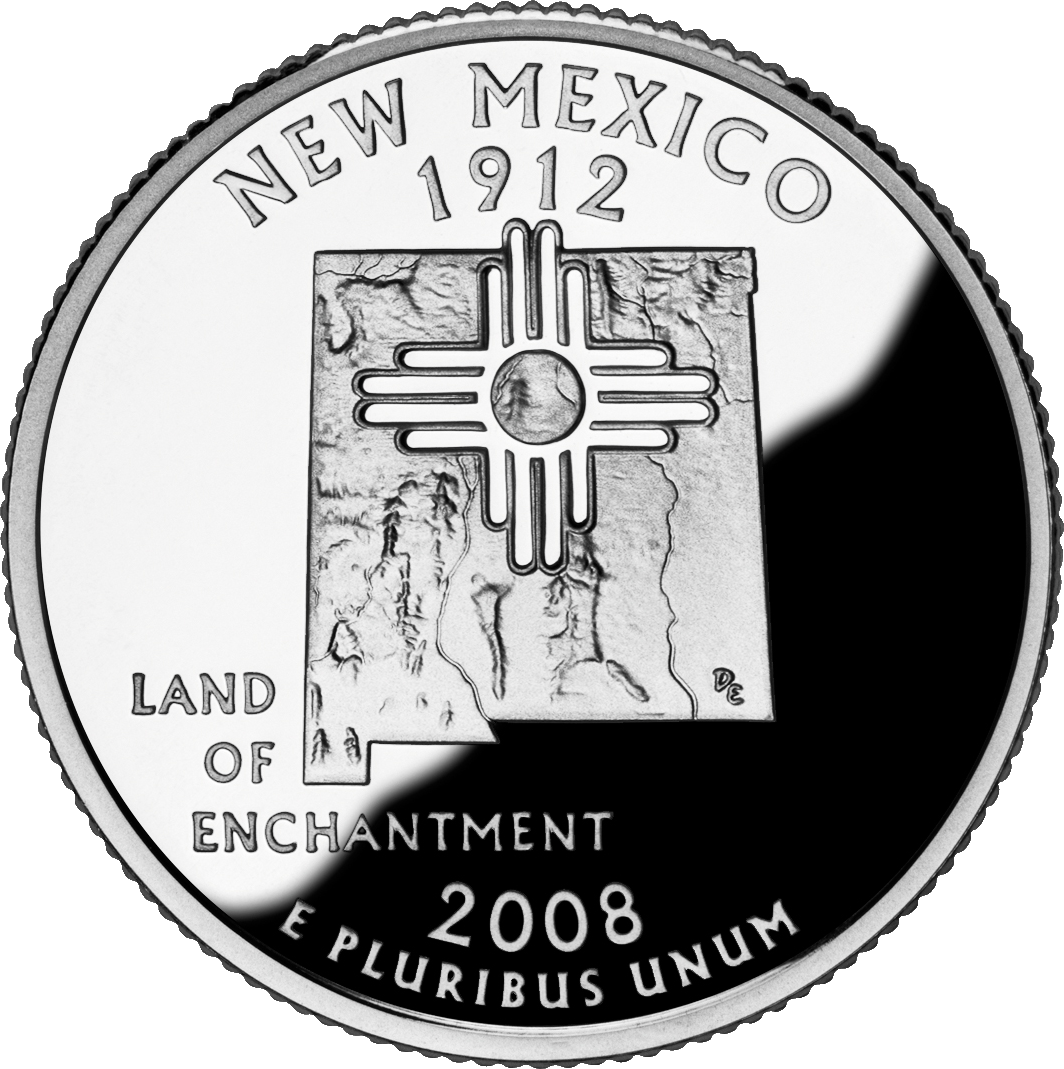
New Mexico state quarter, circulated in April 2008

Oil and gas production, the entertainment industry, high tech scientific research, tourism, and government spending are important drivers of the state economy. The state government has an elaborate system of tax credits and technical assistance to promote job growth and business investment, especially in new technologies. In 2025, 99.0% of businesses in the state were small businesses and employed 53.3% of its work force.

In 2025, New Mexico's gross domestic product was $152.778 billion compared to roughly $80 billion in 2010. State GDP peaked in 2019 at nearly $99 billion but declined in the face of the COVID-19 pandemic. New Mexico's per capita personal income was $61,645 in 2025 compared to $31,474 in 2007; it was the third lowest in the country after West Virginia and Mississippi. The percentage of persons below the poverty level has largely plateaued in the 21st century, from 18.4% in 2005 to 18.2% in 2021. As of May 2025, the state's unemployment rate was 4.2%.

Traditionally dependent on resource extraction, ranching, and railroad transportation, New Mexico has increasingly shifted towards services, high-end manufacturing, and tourism. Since 2017, the state has seen a steady rise in the number of annual visitors, peaking in 2021 at 39.2 million tourists, who had an economic impact of $10 billion. New Mexico has also seen greater investment in media and scientific research.

== Transportation ==
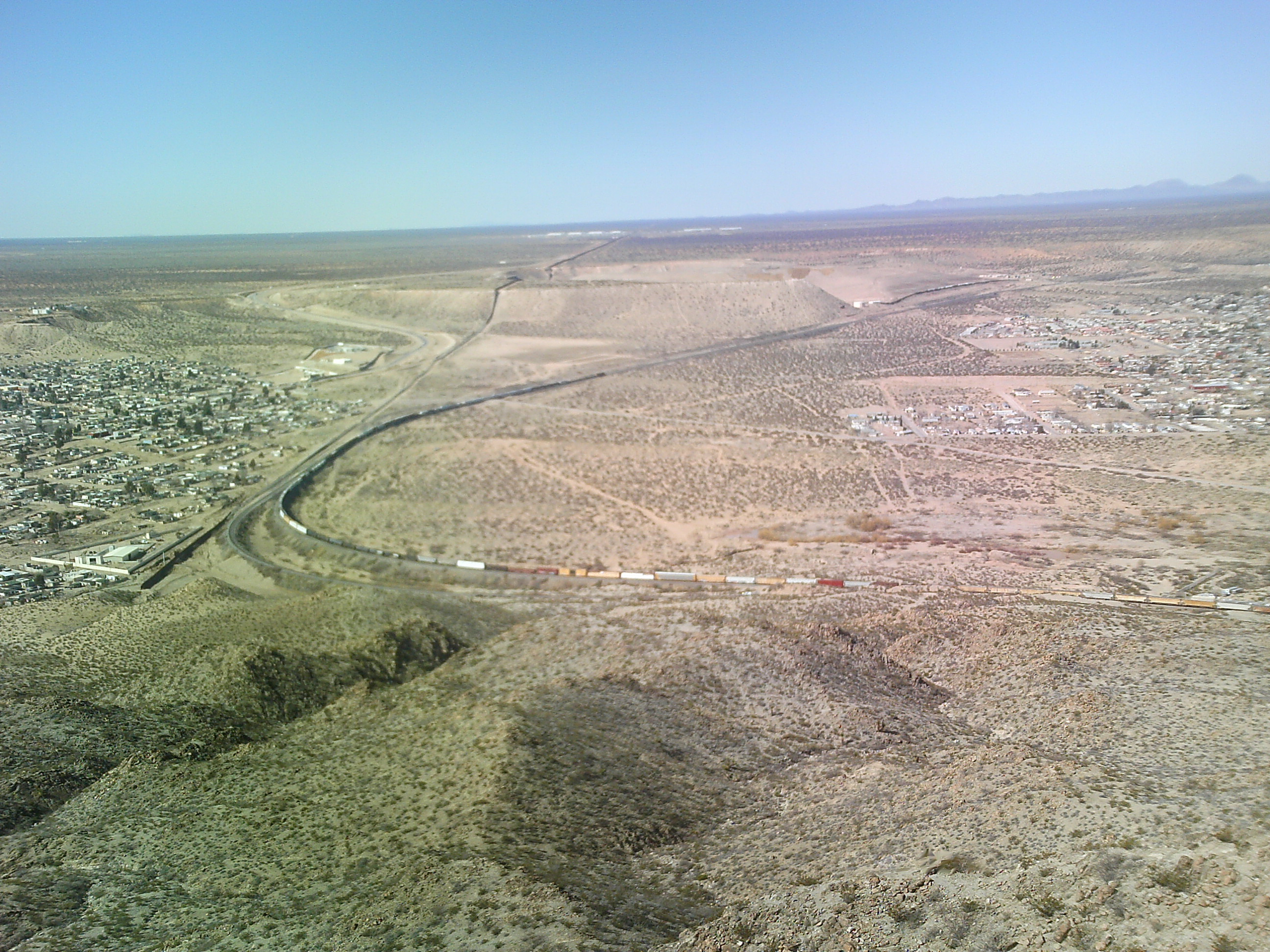
In this photo, the Mexico–United States border divides Sunland Park and the Mexican state of Chihuahua.

New Mexico has long been an important corridor for trade and migration. The builders of the ruins at Chaco Canyon also created a radiating network of roads from the mysterious settlement. Chaco Canyon's trade function shifted to Casas Grandes in the present-day Mexican state of Chihuahua; however, north–south trade continued. Ancient Indigenous trade with Mesoamerican cultures included northbound exotic birds, seashells, and copper. Turquoise, pottery, and salt were some of the goods transported south along the Rio Grande. Present-day New Mexico's pre-Columbian trade is especially remarkable for being undertaken on foot. The north–south trade route later became a path for horse-drawn colonists arriving from New Spain as well as trade and communication; later called El Camino Real de Tierra Adentro, it was among the four "royal roads" that were crucial lifelines to Spanish colonial possessions in North America.

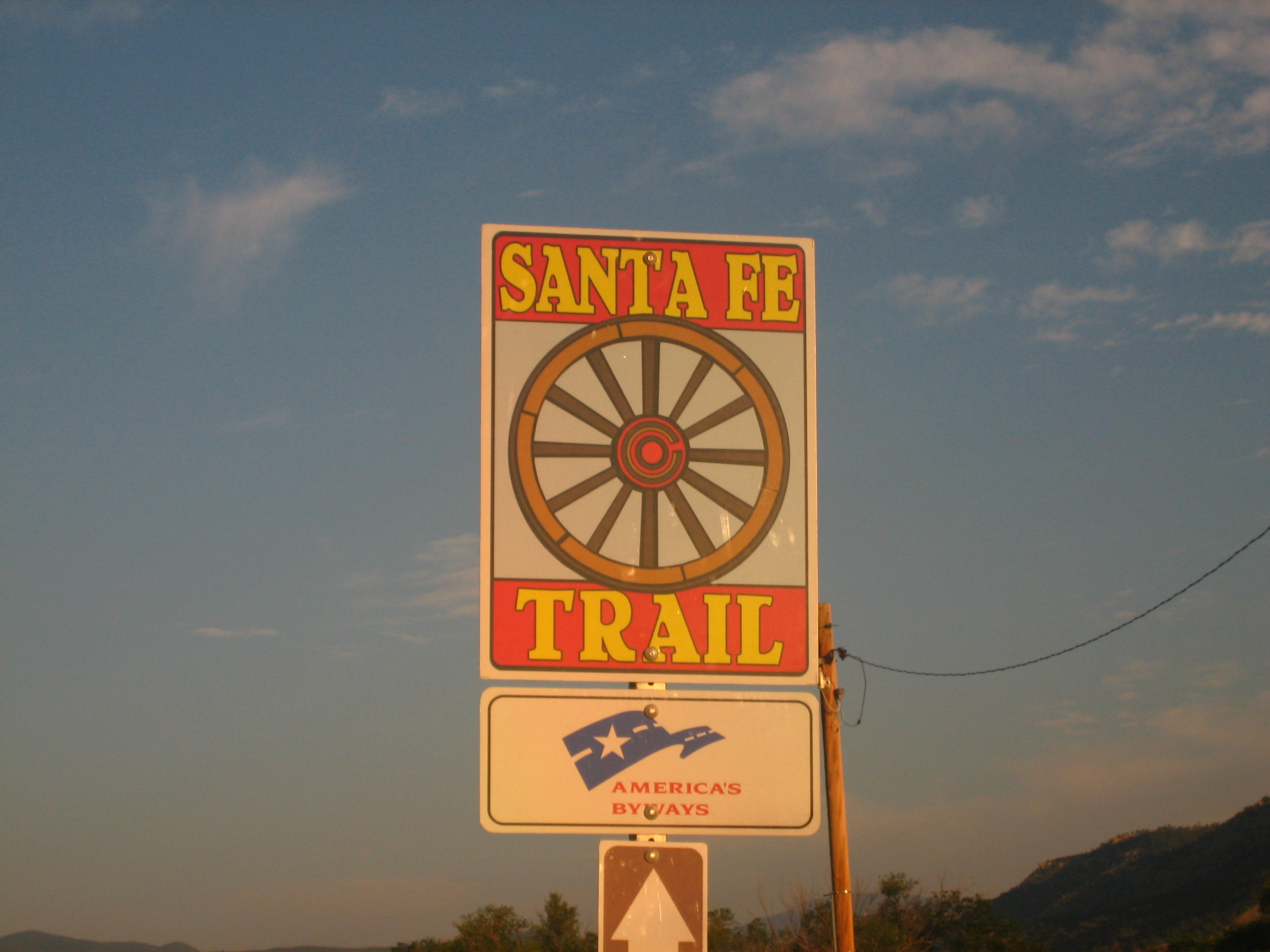
Santa Fe trail sign

The Santa Fe Trail was the 19th-century territory's vital commercial and military highway link to the Eastern United States. Several trails that terminated in northern New Mexico, including the Camino Real, the Santa Fe Trail and the Old Spanish Trail are recognized as National Historic Trails. New Mexico's latitude and low passes made it an attractive east–west transportation corridor. As a territory, the Gadsden Purchase increased New Mexico's land area for the purpose of constructing a southern transcontinental railroad, that of the Southern Pacific Railroad. Another transcontinental railroad was completed by the Atchison, Topeka and Santa Fe Railway. The railroads essentially replaced the earlier trails but prompted a population boom. Early transcontinental auto trails later crossed the state, bringing more migrants. Railroads were later supplemented or replaced by a system of highways and airports. Today, New Mexico's Interstate Highways approximate the earlier land routes of the Camino Real, the Santa Fe Trail, and the transcontinental railroads.

=== Road ===
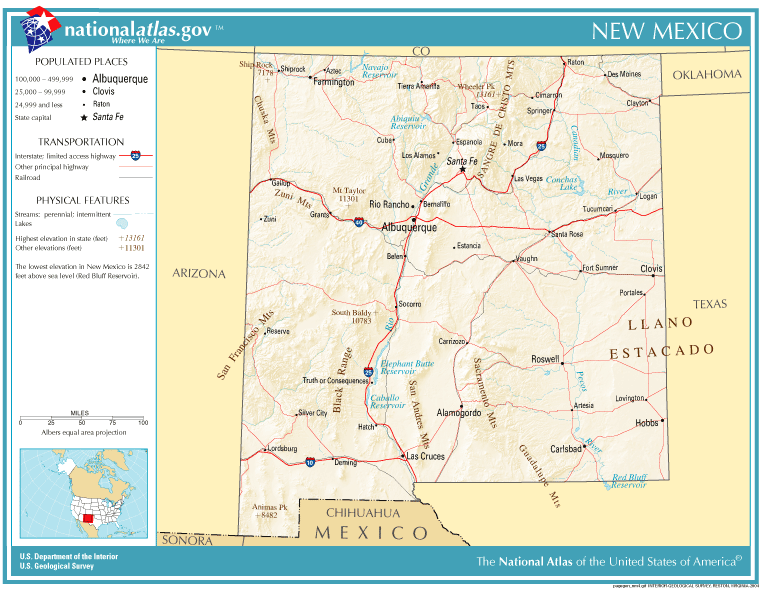

Personal automobiles remain the primary means of transportation for most New Mexicans, especially in rural areas. The state had 59,927 route miles of highway as of 2000, of which 7,037 receive federal aid. That year there were 1,003 miles (1,614 km) of freeways, of which 1,000 were the route miles of Interstate Highways 10, 25 and 40. The former number has increased with the upgrading of roads near Pojoaque, Santa Fe, and Las Cruces to freeways. Notable bridges include the Rio Grande Gorge Bridge near Taos. Larger cities in New Mexico typically have some form of public transportation by road; ABQ RIDE is the state's largest such system. Rural and intercity public transportation by road is provided by Americanos USA, LLC, Greyhound Lines, and several government operators.

New Mexico is plagued by poor road conditions, with roughly a third of its roadways suffering from "inadequate state and local funding". As of 2001, 703 highway bridges, or one percent, were declared "structurally deficient" or "structurally obsolete". Data from 2019 found 207 bridges and more than 3,822 miles of highway in subpar condition, resulting in greater commute times and higher costs in vehicles maintenance.

New Mexico has historically had a problem with drunk driving, though this has lessened: According to the Los Angeles Times, the state once had the nation's highest alcohol-related crash rates but ranked 25th in this regard by 2009. The highway traffic fatality rate was 1.9 per million miles traveled in 2000, the 13th-highest among U.S. states. A 2022 report cited poor roads as a major factor in New Mexico's continually high traffic fatalities; between 2015 and 2019, close to 1,900 people were killed in automotive crashes in the state.

=== Highways ===
New Mexico has only three Interstate Highways: Interstate 10 travels southwest from the Arizona state line near Lordsburg to the area between Las Cruces and Anthony, near El Paso, Texas; Interstate 25 is a major north–south interstate highway starting from Las Cruces to the Colorado state line near Raton; and Interstate 40 is a major east–west interstate highway starting from the Arizona state line west of Gallup to the Texas state line east from Tucumcari. In Albuquerque, I-25 and I-40 meet at a stack interchange called The Big I. The state is tied with Delaware, North Dakota, Puerto Rico, and Rhode Island in having the fewest primary interstate routes, which is partly a reflection of its rugged geography and sparse population.

New Mexico currently has 15 United States Highways, which account for over 2,980 miles (4,800 km) of its highway system. All but seven of its 33 counties are served by U.S. routes, with most of the remainder connected by Interstate Highways. Most routes were built in 1926 by the state government and are still managed and maintained by state or local authorities. The longest is U.S. 70, which spans over 448 miles (721 km) across southern New Mexico, making up roughly 15% of the state's total U.S. Highway length; the shortest is U.S. 160, which runs just 0.86 miles (1.38 km) across the northwestern corner of the state, between the Arizona and Colorado borders.

The most famous route in New Mexico, if not the United States, was U.S. 66, colloquially known as the nation's "Mother Road" for its scenic beauty and importance to migrants fleeing West from the Dust Bowl of the 1930s. The road crossed through northern New Mexico, connecting the cities of Albuquerque and Gallup, before being replaced by I-40 in 1985. Much of U.S. 66 remains in use for tourism and has been preserved for historical significance. Another famous route was U.S. 666, which ran south to north along the western portion of the state, serving the Four Corners area. It was known as the "Devil's Highway" due to the number 666 denoting the "Number of the beast" in Christianity; this numerical designation, as well as its high fatality rate, was subject to controversy, superstition, and numerous cultural references. U.S. 666 was subsequently renamed U.S. Route 491 in 2003. Many existing and former highways in New Mexico are recognized for their aesthetic, cultural, or historical significance, particularly for tourism purposes. The state hosts ten out of 184 "America's Byways", which are federally designated for preservation due to their scenic beauty or national importance.

=== Rail ===
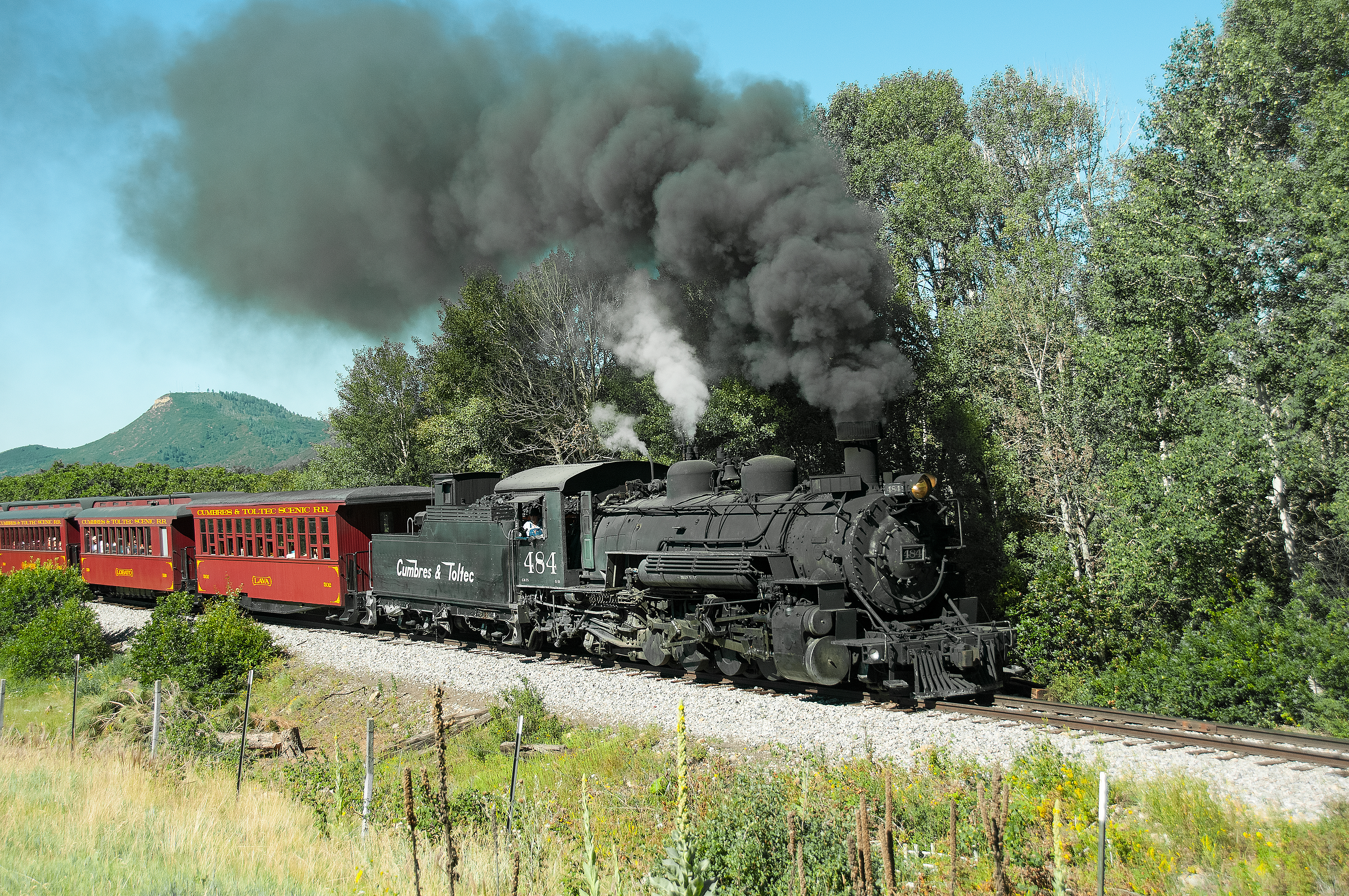
The Cumbres and Toltec Scenic Railroad

There were 2,354 route miles of railroads in 2000; this number increased by a few miles with the opening of the Rail Runner's extension to Santa Fe in 2006. In addition to local railroads and other tourist lines, the state jointly owns and operates a heritage narrow-gauge steam railroad, the Cumbres and Toltec Scenic Railway, with the state of Colorado since 1970. Narrow-gauge railroads once connected many communities in the northern part of the state, from Farmington to Santa Fe. No fewer than 100 railroads of various names and lineage have operated in the state at some point. New Mexico's rail transportation system peaked in length after it became a U.S. state; in 1914, eleven railroads operated 3,124 route miles.

Railroad surveyors arrived in New Mexico in the 1850s shortly after it became a U.S. territory. The first railroads incorporated in 1869, and the first railway became operational in 1878: the Atchison, Topeka & Santa Fe Railway (ATSF), which entered via the lucrative and contested Raton Pass. The ATSF reached El Paso, Texas in 1881, and with the entry of the Southern Pacific Railroad from the Arizona Territory in 1880, created the nation's second transcontinental railroad, with a junction at Deming. The Denver & Rio Grande Railway, which generally used narrow gauge equipment in New Mexico, entered the territory from Colorado, beginning service to Española in December 1880. These first railroads were built as long-distance corridors; later railroad construction also targeted resource extraction.

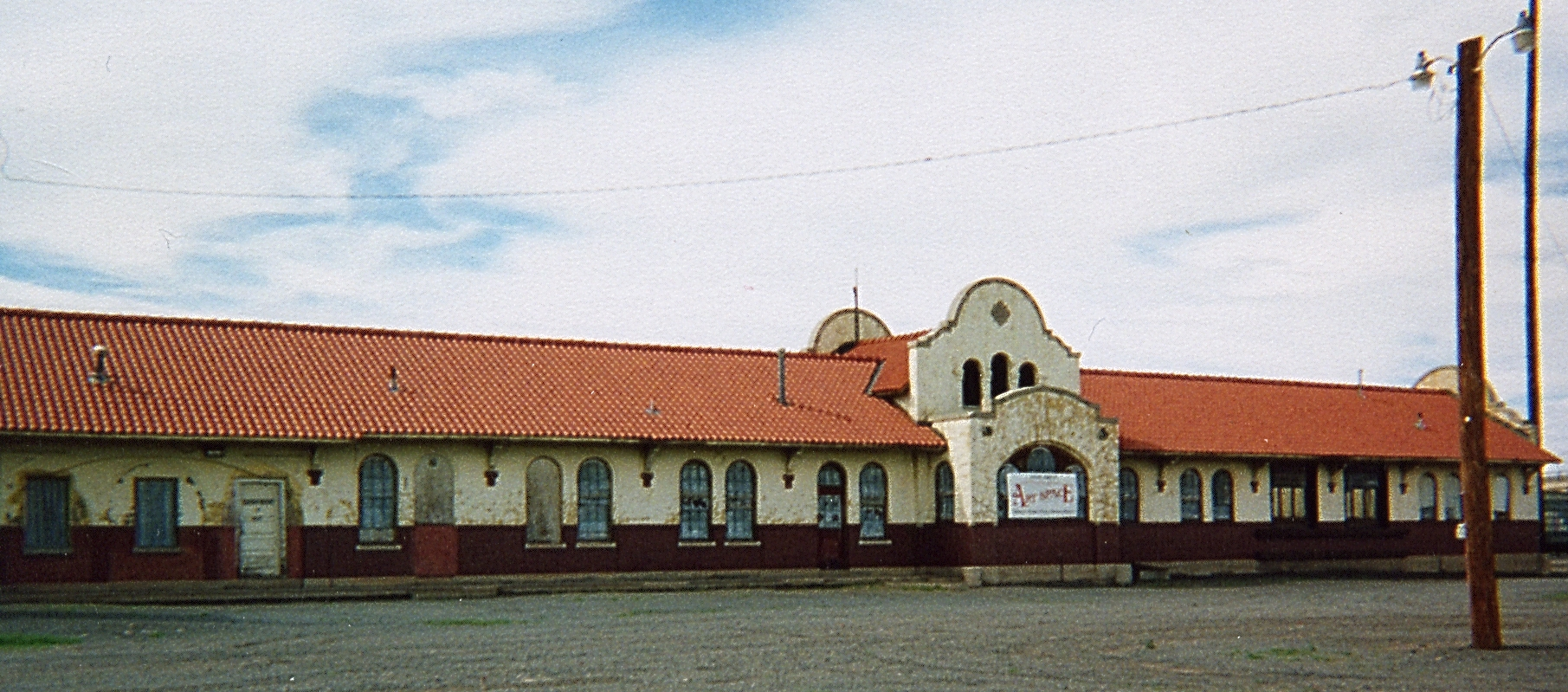
The railway station in Tucumcari

The rise of rail transportation was a major source of demographic and economic growth, with many settlements expanding or established shortly thereafter. As early as 1878, the ATSF promoted tourism in the region with an emphasis on Native American imagery. Named trains often reflected the territory they traveled: Super Chief, the streamlined successor to the Chief; Navajo, an early transcontinental tourist train; and Cavern, a through car operation connecting Clovis and Carlsbad (by the early 1950s as train 23–24), were some of the named passenger trains of the ATSF that connoted New Mexico, The Super Chief became a favorite of early Hollywood stars and among the most famous named trains in the U.S.; it was known for its luxury and exoticness, with cars bearing the name of regional Native American tribes and outfitted with the artwork of many local artists, but also for its speed, taking as little as 39 hours 45 minutes to reach Los Angeles from Chicago.

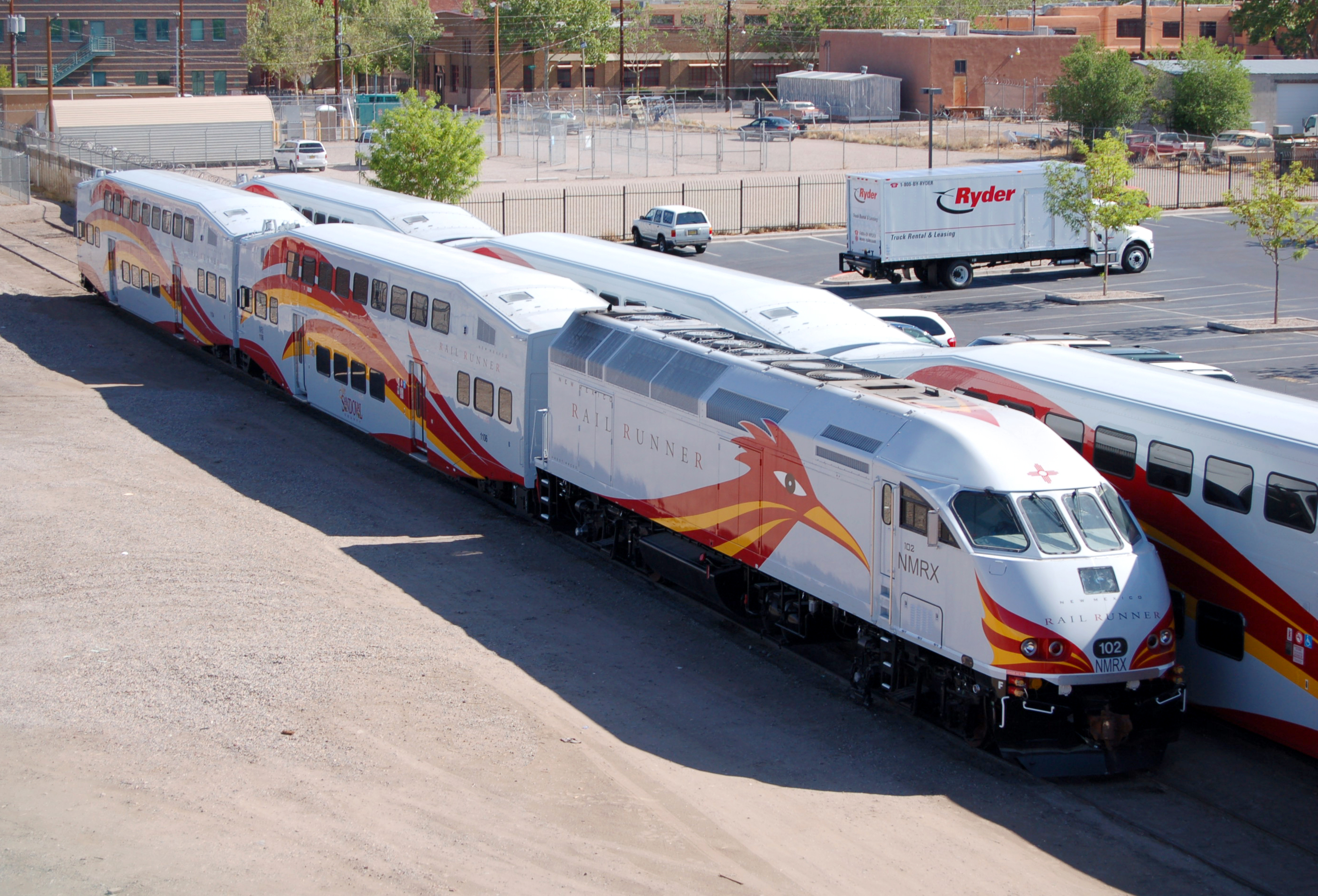
The New Mexico Rail Runner Express is a commuter operation that runs along the Central Rio Grande Valley.

At its height, passenger train service connected nine of New Mexico's present ten most populous cities (the sole exception is Rio Rancho); only Albuquerque and Santa Fe are still connected by rail. With the decline of most intercity rail service in the U.S. in the late 1960s, New Mexico was left with minimal services; no less than six daily long-distance round-trip trains, supplemented by many branch-line and local trains, served New Mexico in the early 1960s. Declines in passenger revenue, but not necessarily ridership, prompted many railroads to turn over their passenger services in truncated form to Amtrak, a state-owned enterprise. Amtrak, also known as the National Passenger Railroad Corporation, began operating the two extant long-distance routes on May 1, 1971. Resurrection of passenger rail service from Denver to El Paso, a route once plied in part by the ATSF's El Pasoan, has been proposed; in the 1980s, Governor Toney Anaya suggested building a high-speed rail line connecting the two cities with New Mexico's major cities. In 2004, the Colorado-based nonprofit Front Range Commuter Rail was established, with the goal of connecting Wyoming and New Mexico with high-speed rail; it became inactive in 2011.

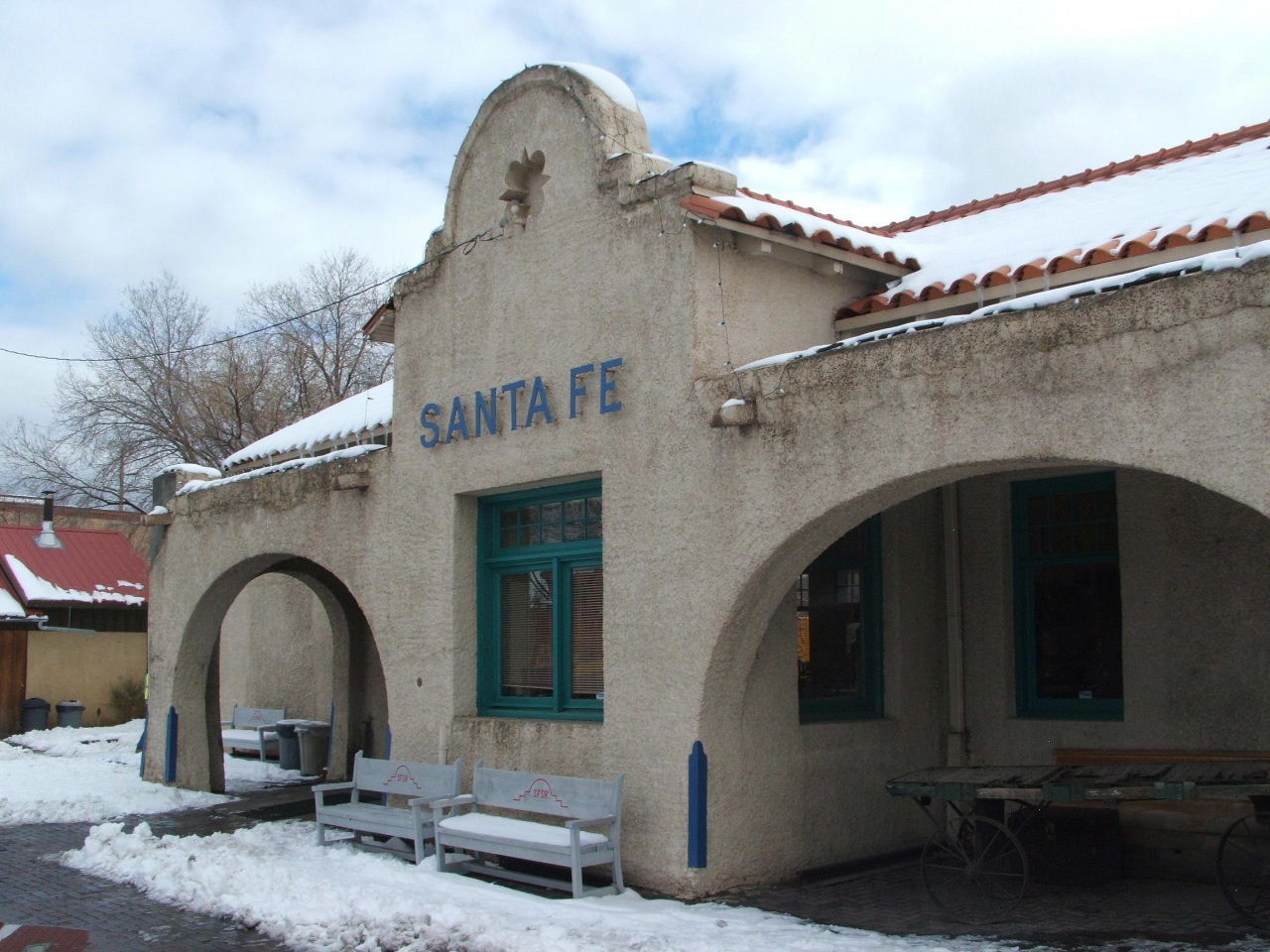
Downtown Santa Fe train station

Since 2006, a state-owned, privately run commuter railway, the New Mexico Rail Runner Express, has served the Albuquerque metropolitan area, connecting the city proper with Santa Fe and other communities. The system expanded in 2008 with the addition of the BNSF Railway's line from Belen to a few miles south of Lamy. Phase II of Rail Runner extended the line northward to Santa Fe from the Sandoval County station, the northernmost station under Phase I service; the service now connects Santa Fe, Sandoval, Bernalillo, and Valencia counties. Rail Runner operates scheduled service seven days per week, connecting Albuquerque's population base and central business district to downtown Santa Fe with up to eight round trips in a day; the section of the line running south to Belen is served less frequently.

Amtrak's Southwest Chief passes through daily at stations in Gallup, Albuquerque, Lamy, Las Vegas, and Raton, offering connections to Los Angeles, Chicago and intermediate points. A successor to the Super Chief and El Capitan, the Southwest Chief is permitted a maximum speed of 90 mph (140 km/h) in various places on the tracks of the BNSF Railway; it also operates on New Mexico Rail Runner Express trackage. The Sunset Limited makes stops three times a week in both directions at Lordsburg, and Deming, serving Los Angeles, New Orleans and intermediate points. The Sunset Limited is the successor to the Southern Pacific Railroad's train of the same name and operates exclusively on Union Pacific trackage in New Mexico.

New Mexico is served by two of the nation's ten class I railroads, which denote the highest revenue railways for freight: the BNSF Railway and the Union Pacific Railroad. Together, they operate 2,200 route miles of railway in the state.

=== Aerospace ===
New Mexico has four primary commercial airports that are served by most major domestic and international airliners. Albuquerque International Sunport is the state's main aerial port of entry and by far the largest airport: It is the only one designated a medium-sized hub by the Federal Aviation Administration, serving millions of passengers annually.

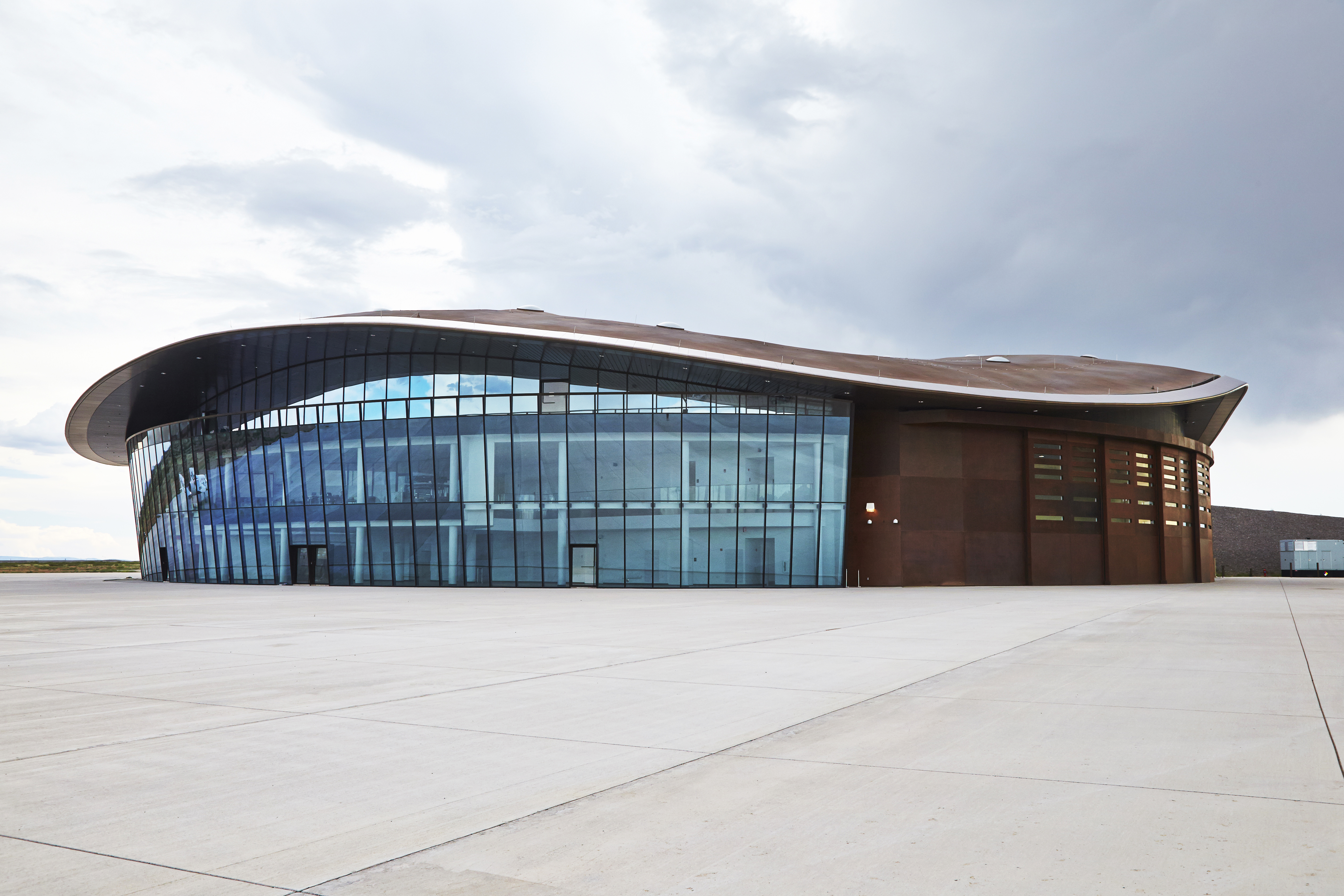
Spaceport America terminal, The Gateway

The only other comparatively large airports are Lea County Regional Airport, Roswell International Air Center, and Santa Fe Regional Airport, which have varying degrees of service by major airlines. Most airports in New Mexico are small, general aviation hubs operated by municipal and county governments, and usually served solely by local and regional commuter airlines.

Due to its sparse population and many isolated, rural communities, New Mexico ranks among the states most reliant on Essential Air Service, a federal program that maintains a minimal level of scheduled air service to communities that are otherwise unprofitable for commercial airlines.

==== Spaceport America ====
New Mexico hosts the world's first operational and purpose-built commercial spaceport, Spaceport America, located in Upham, near Truth or Consequences. It is operated by the state-backed New Mexico Spaceport Authority (NMSA). Rocket launches began in April 2007, with the spaceport officially opening in 2011. Tenants include HAPSMobile, UP Aerospace, SpinLaunch, and Virgin Galactic.

Over 300 suborbital flights have been successfully launched from Spaceport America since 2006, with the most notable being Virgin Galactic's VSS Unity on May 22, 2021, which made New Mexico the third U.S. state to launch humans into space, after California and Florida.

On October 22, 2021, Spaceport America was the site of the first successfully tested vacuum-sealed "suborbital accelerator", which aims to offer a significantly more economical alternative to launching satellites via rockets. Conducted by Spaceport tenant SpinLaunch, the test is the first of roughly 30 demonstrations being planned.

== Government and politics ==
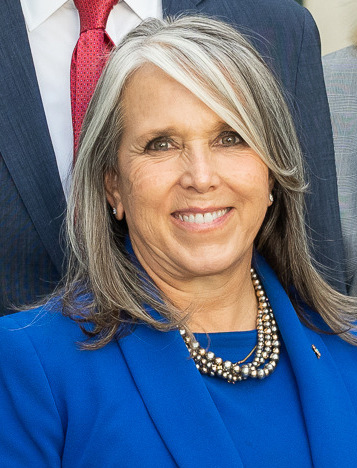
Governor Michelle Lujan Grisham (D)

The Constitution of New Mexico was adopted by popular referendum in 1911. It establishes a republican form of government based on popular sovereignty and a separation of powers. New Mexico has a bill of rights modeled on its federal counterpart, but with more expansive rights and freedoms; for example, victims of certain serious crimes, such as aggravated battery and sexual assault, have explicit rights to privacy, dignity, and the timely adjudication of their case. Major state issues may be decided by popular vote, and the constitution may be amended by a majority vote of both lawmakers and the electorate.

=== Governmental structure ===
Mirroring the federal system, the New Mexico government consists of executive, legislative, and judicial departments. The executive is led by the governor and other popularly elected officials, including the lieutenant governor (elected on the same ticket as the governor), attorney general, secretary of state, state auditor, state treasurer, and commissioner of public lands. New Mexico's governor is granted more authority than those of other states, with the power to appoint most high-ranking officials in the cabinet and other state agencies.

The legislative branch consists of the bicameral New Mexico Legislature, comprising the 70-member House of Representatives and the 42-member Senate. Members of the House are elected to two-year terms, while those of the Senate are elected every four years. New Mexican legislators are unique in the U.S. for being volunteers, receiving only a daily stipend while in session; this "citizen legislature" dates back to New Mexico's admission as a state, and is considered a source of civic pride.

The judiciary is headed by the New Mexico Supreme Court, the state's highest court, which primarily adjudicates appeals from lower courts or government agencies. It is made up of five judges popularly elected every eight years with overlapping terms. Below the state supreme court is the New Mexico Court of Appeals, which has intermediate appellate jurisdiction statewide. New Mexico has 13 judicial districts with circuit courts of general jurisdiction, as well as various municipal, magistrate, and probate courts of limited jurisdiction.

New Mexico is organized into numerous local governments consisting of counties, municipalities, and special districts.

=== Politics ===
Since 2018, New Mexico has been led by Governor Michelle Lujan Grisham and Lieutenant Governor Howie Morales, both of the Democratic Party. All constitutional officers are currently Democrats, including Secretary of State Maggie Toulouse Oliver, Attorney General Raúl Torrez, State Auditor Joseph Maestas, State Land Commissioner Stephanie Garcia Richard, and State Treasurer Laura Montoya.

Party registration as of August 31, 2026
Party	Number of voters	Percentage
Democratic	575,726	39.07%
Republican	444,654	30.06%
Independent / other	403,396	27.80%
Libertarian	27,205	1.90%
Total	1,450,981	100.0%

Both chambers of the New Mexico Legislature have Democratic majorities: 27 Democrats and 15 Republicans in the Senate, and 45 Democrats and 25 Republicans in the House of Representatives. Likewise, the state is represented in the U.S. Senate by Democrats Martin Heinrich and Ben Ray Luján. The state's three delegates to the U.S. House of Representatives are Democrats Melanie Stansbury, Gabe Vasquez, and Teresa Leger Fernandez, representing the first, second, and third districts, respectively.

2024 U.S. presidential election results by county in New Mexico Democratic Republican

Since achieving statehood in 1912, New Mexico has been carried by the national popular vote winner in every presidential election except in 1976 and 2024. Until 2008, New Mexico was a swing state in presidential elections. The 1992 election of Bill Clinton marked the first time the state was won by a Democrat since Lyndon B. Johnson in 1964. Al Gore narrowly carried the state in 2000, and George W. Bush won in 2004 by less than 6,000 votes. The election of Barack Obama in 2008 marked the state's transition into a Democratic stronghold; Obama was also the first Democrat to win a majority of New Mexico votes since Johnson. Obama won New Mexico again in 2012, followed by Hillary Clinton in 2016, Joe Biden in 2020, and Kamala Harris in 2024.

Party registration by New Mexico county (February 2023): Democratic ≥ 30% Democratic ≥ 40% Democratic ≥ 50% Democratic ≥ 60% Democratic ≥ 70% Republican ≥ 40% Republican ≥ 50% Republican ≥ 60%

Although state politics are decidedly Democratic-leaning, New Mexico's political culture is relatively moderate and bipartisan by national standards. While registered Democrats outnumber registered Republicans by nearly 200,000, New Mexico voters have historically favored moderate to conservative candidates of both parties at the state and federal levels: according to Pew Research, the largest political ideology among New Mexicans is political moderate at 36%, while 34% are conservatives, 23% are liberal, and 7% stated they did not know. Likewise, New Mexico's demographics are atypical of most traditional liberal states with "political ideology less important" than candidates' profiles or outreach efforts. Due to their historically positive connections to the state's heritage, the Republican and Democratic parties of New Mexico are each relatively robust, and New Mexico is considered a bellwether state. The state's Republican Party was the first to incorporate Hispanics and Natives into leadership roles, such as territorial governor Miguel Antonio Otero and state governor Octaviano Ambrosio Larrazolo, later the first Mexican American and first Hispanic member of the U.S. Senate. Republican president Theodore Roosevelt greatly respected the Hispanos, Mexican Americans, and indigenous communities of New Mexico, many of whom had been part of his Rough Riders.

Lujan Grisham succeeded two-term Republican governor Susana Martinez on January 1, 2019. Gary Johnson was governor from 1995 to 2003 as a Republican, but in 2012 and 2016 ran for president as the Libertarian Party nominee. New Mexico's Second Congressional District is among the most competitive in the country: Republican Herrell narrowly lost to Democrat Xochitl Torres Small in 2018, retook her seat in 2020, and lost to Democrat Gabe Vasquez in 2022. Election cycles within the past decade have seen moderate incumbents replaced by progressive Democrats in cities like Albuquerque, Santa Fe, and Las Cruces, with conservative Republicans elected in rural areas. Democrats are usually strongest in the Santa Fe area, parts of the Albuquerque metro area (such as the southeast and central areas, including the affluent Nob Hill neighborhood and the vicinity of the University of New Mexico), Northern and West Central New Mexico, and Native American reservations, especially the Navajo Nation. Republicans have traditionally had strongholds in the state's east and south, the Farmington area, Rio Rancho, and the newly developed areas in the northwest mesa. Albuquerque's Northeast Heights have historically leaned Republican but have recently become a key swing area for Democrats.

A 2020 study ranked New Mexico as the 20th-hardest state for citizens to vote in, primarily due to the inaccessibility of polling stations for many isolated communities.

==== Female minority representation ====
New Mexico has elected more women of color to public office than any other U.S. state. While the trend is partly reflective of the state's disproportionately high Hispanic and indigenous populations, it also reflects longstanding cultural and political trends: In 1922, Soledad Chávez Chacón was the first woman elected secretary of state of New Mexico, and the first Hispanic woman elected to statewide office in the United States. Republican governor Susana Martinez was the first Hispanic female governor in the United States, and Democrat congresswoman Deb Haaland was among the first Native American women elected to the U.S. Congress.

Research by the Center for American Women and Politics at Rutgers University found that two-thirds of all nonwhite women who have ever been elected governor in the U.S. are from New Mexico, including the current governor, Lujan Grisham. The state also accounts for nearly one-third of the women of color who have served in any statewide executive office, such as lieutenant governor and secretary of state, a distinction shared by only ten other states. New Mexico also has a relatively high percentage of state legislators who are women of color, which at 16% is the sixth highest in the nation.

New Mexico is described as a "national leader in electing female legislators". As of January 2023, it ranked sixth in the number of female state legislators (43.8%), with women comprising a majority of the New Mexico House of Representatives (53%) and over a quarter of the Senate (29%). Women also hold a majority of seats on the state Supreme Court and the Court of Appeals. At the federal level, two out of three congressional districts are represented by women.

=== Local government ===
Local government in New Mexico consists primarily of counties and municipalities. There are 33 counties, of which the most populous is Bernalillo, which contains the state's largest city, Albuquerque. Counties are usually governed by an elected five-member county commission, sheriff, assessor, clerk, and treasurer. A municipality may call itself a village, town, or city, with no distinction in law and no correlation to any particular form of government. Municipal elections are non-partisan. In addition, limited local authority can be vested in special districts and landowners' associations.

=== Law ===
New Mexico is one of 23 states without the death penalty, becoming the 15th state to abolish capital punishment in 2009.

United States presidential election results for New Mexico
Year	Republican		Democratic		Third party(ies)	
Year	No.	%	No.	%	No.	%
1912	17,733	35.91%	20,437	41.39%	11,206	22.70%
1916	31,152	46.64%	33,527	50.20%	2,108	3.16%
1920	57,634	54.68%	46,668	44.27%	1,104	1.05%
1924	54,745	48.52%	48,542	43.02%	9,543	8.46%
1928	69,645	59.01%	48,211	40.85%	158	0.13%
1932	54,217	35.76%	95,089	62.72%	2,300	1.52%
1936	61,727	36.50%	106,037	62.69%	1,372	0.81%
1940	79,315	43.28%	103,699	56.59%	244	0.13%
1944	70,688	46.44%	81,389	53.47%	148	0.10%
1948	80,303	42.93%	105,464	56.38%	1,296	0.69%
1952	132,170	55.39%	105,661	44.28%	777	0.33%
1956	146,788	57.81%	106,098	41.78%	1,040	0.41%
1960	153,733	49.41%	156,027	50.15%	1,347	0.43%
1964	131,838	40.24%	194,017	59.22%	1,760	0.54%
1968	169,692	51.85%	130,081	39.75%	27,508	8.41%
1972	235,606	61.05%	141,084	36.56%	9,241	2.39%
1976	211,419	50.75%	201,148	48.28%	4,023	0.97%
1980	250,779	54.97%	167,826	36.78%	37,632	8.25%
1984	307,101	59.70%	201,769	39.23%	5,500	1.07%
1988	270,341	51.86%	244,497	46.90%	6,449	1.24%
1992	212,824	37.34%	261,617	45.90%	95,545	16.76%
1996	232,751	41.86%	273,495	49.18%	49,828	8.96%
2000	286,417	47.85%	286,783	47.91%	25,405	4.24%
2004	376,930	49.84%	370,942	49.05%	8,432	1.11%
2008	346,832	41.78%	472,422	56.91%	10,904	1.31%
2012	335,788	42.84%	415,335	52.99%	32,634	4.16%
2016	319,667	40.04%	385,234	48.26%	93,418	11.70%
2020	401,894	43.50%	501,614	54.29%	20,457	2.21%
2024	423,391	45.85%	478,802	51.85%	21,210	2.30%

The state has among the most permissive firearms laws in the country. Its constitution explicitly enshrines the right to bear arms and prevents local governments from regulating gun ownership. Residents may purchase any firearm deemed legal under federal law without a permit. State law mandates a seven-day waiting period for picking up a firearm after it has been purchased (holders of concealed handgun licenses are exempt from the waiting period), although no restrictions on magazine capacity. New Mexico is a "shall-issue" state for concealed carry permits, giving applicants the presumptive right to a license without giving a compelling reason.

Before December 2013, New Mexico law was silent on same-sex marriage. The issuance of marriage licenses to same-sex couples was determined at the county level, with some county clerks issuing marriage licenses to same-sex couples and others not. In December 2013, the New Mexico Supreme Court unanimously directed county clerks to issue marriage licenses to same-sex couples, thereby making New Mexico the 17th state to recognize same-sex marriage statewide.

Based on 2008 data, New Mexico had 146 law enforcement agencies across the state, county, and municipal levels. State law enforcement is statutorily administered by the Department of Public Safety (DPS). The New Mexico State Police is a division of the DPS with jurisdiction over all crimes in the state. As of 2008, New Mexico had over 5,000 sworn police officers, a ratio of 252 per 100,000 residents, which is roughly the same as the nation. The state struggles with one of the nation's highest rates of officer-involved killings, which has prompted political and legal reforms at local and state levels.

In April 2021, New Mexico became the 18th state to legalize cannabis for recreational use; possession, personal cultivation, and retail sales are permitted under certain conditions, while relevant marijuana-related arrests and convictions are expunged. New Mexico has long pioneered loosening cannabis restrictions: In 1978, it was the first state to pass legislation allowing the medical use of marijuana in some form, albeit restricted to a federal research program. In 1999, Republican Governor Gary Johnson became the highest-ranking elected official in the U.S. to publicly endorse drug legalization. Medicinal marijuana was fully legalized in 2007, making New Mexico the 12th state to do so, and the fourth via legislative action. In 2019, it was the first U.S. state to decriminalize possession of drug paraphernalia.

As of June 2022, New Mexico has one of the nation's most permissive abortion laws: elective abortion care is legal at all stages of pregnancy, without restrictions such as long waiting periods or parental consent. In 2021, the state repealed a 1969 "trigger law" that had banned most abortion procedures, which would have come into effect after the U.S. Supreme Court's ruling in Dobbs v. Jackson Women's Health Organization. In response to the Dobbs decision, which held that abortion was not a constitutional right, New Mexico's governor issued an executive order protecting abortion providers from out-of-state litigation, in anticipation of the influx of nonresidents seeking abortions.

=== Fiscal policy ===
New Mexico's government has one of the largest state budgets per capita, at $9,101 per resident. As of 2017, the state had an S&P Global Rating of AA+, denoting very strong capacity to meet financial commitments and very low credit risk.

New Mexico has two constitutionally mandated permanent funds: The Land Grant Permanent Fund (LGPF), established upon statehood in 1912, and the Severance Tax Permanent Fund (STPF), created in 1973 during the oil boom. Both funds derive revenue from rents, royalties, and bonuses related to the state's extensive oil, gas, and mining operations; the vast majority of the LGPF's distributions are earmarked for "common [public] schools", while all distributions from the STPF are allocated to the LGPF. As of 2020, the LGPF was valued at $21.6 billion and the STPF at $5.8 billion.

== Education ==
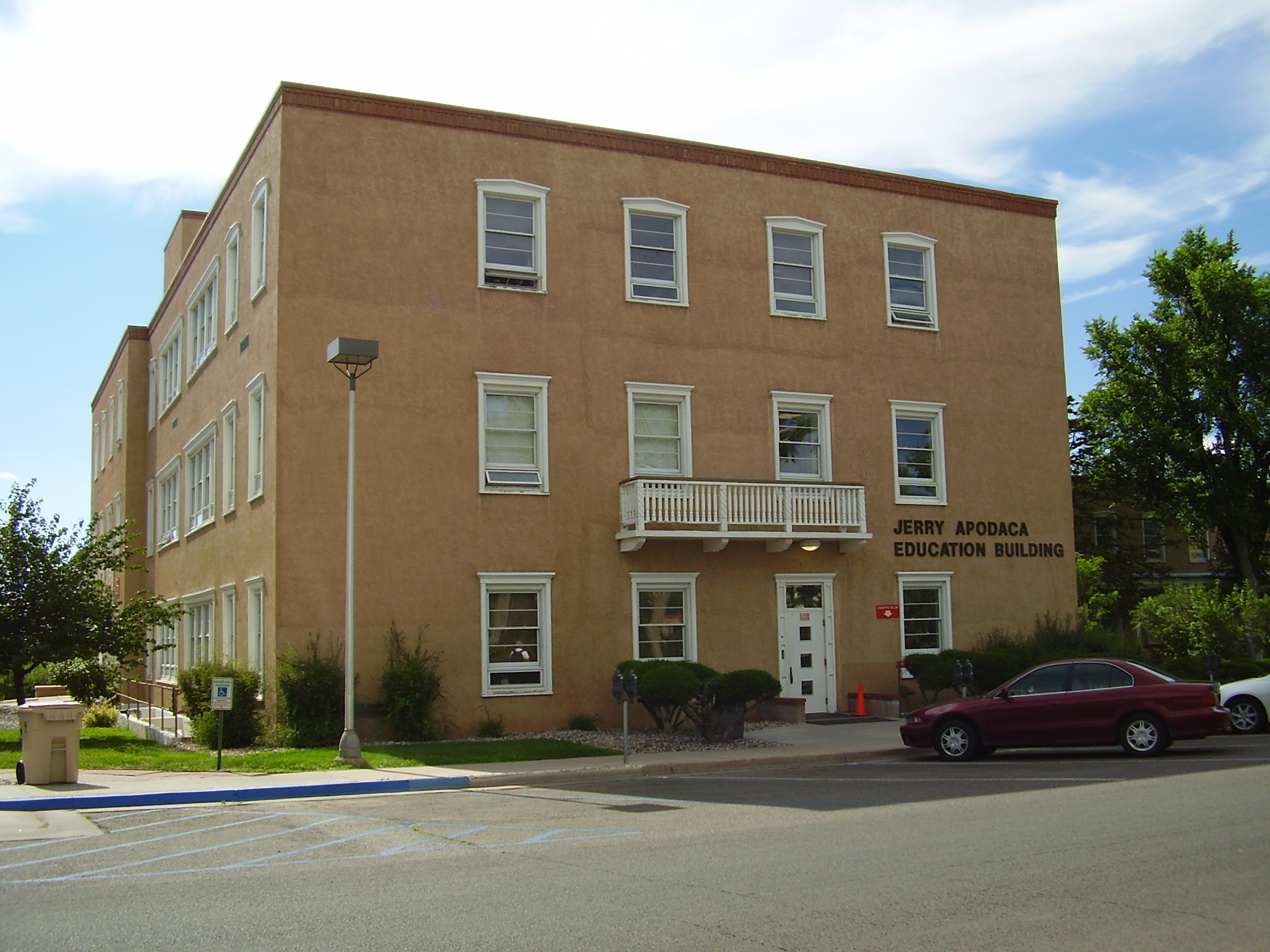
The New Mexico Public Education Department is in Santa Fe.

Due to its relatively low population and numerous federally funded research facilities, New Mexico had the highest concentration of PhD holders of any state in 2000. Los Alamos County, which hosts the eponymous national laboratory, leads the state in the most post-secondary degree holders, at 38.7% of residents, or 4,899 of 17,950. However, New Mexico routinely ranks near the bottom in studies measuring the quality of primary and secondary school education.

By national standards, New Mexico has one of the highest concentrations of persons who did not finish high school or have some college education, albeit by a low margin: Slightly more than 14% of residents did not have a high school diploma, compared to the national rate of 11.4%, the fifth lowest out of 52 U.S. states and territories. Almost a quarter of people over 25 (23.9%) did not complete college, compared with 21% nationally. New Mexico ranks among the bottom ten states in the proportion of residents with a bachelor's degree or higher (27.7%), but 21st in PhD earners (12.2%); the national average is 33.1% and 12.8%, respectively. In 2020, the number of doctorate recipients was 300, placing the state 34th in the nation.

In 2018, a state judge issued a landmark ruling that "New Mexico is violating the constitutional rights of at-risk students by failing to provide them with sufficient education", in particularly those with indigenous, non-English-speaking, and low-income backgrounds. The court ordered the governor and legislature to provide an adequate system by April 2019; in response, New Mexico increased teacher salaries, funded an extended school year, expanded prekindergarten childhood education programs, and developed a budget formula for delivering more funding to schools that serve at-risk and low-income students. Nevertheless, many activists and public officials contend that these efforts continue to fall short, particularly with respect to Native American schools and students.

=== Primary and secondary education ===
The New Mexico Public Education Department oversees the operation of primary and secondary schools; individual school districts directly operate and staff schools.

In January 2022, New Mexico became the first state in the U.S. to recruit national guardsmen and state workers to serve as substitute teachers due to staffing shortages caused by COVID-19. Partly in response to pandemic-related shortages, on March 1, 2022, Governor Grisham signed into law four bills to increase the salaries and benefits of teachers and other school staff, particularly in entry-level positions.

=== Postsecondary education ===
Public New Mexico colleges and universities. New Mexico Higher Education Department.

New Mexico has 41 accredited, degree-granting institutions; twelve are private and 29 are state-funded, including four tribal colleges. Additionally, select students can attend certain institutions in Colorado, at in-state tuition rates, pursuant to a reciprocity program between the two states.

Graduates of four-year colleges in New Mexico have some of the lowest student debt burdens in the U.S.; the class of 2017 owed an average of $21,237 compared with a national average of $28,650, according to the Institute for College Access & Success.

New Mexico ranked 13th in the 2022 Social Mobility Index (SMI), which measures the extent to which economically disadvantaged students (with family incomes below the national median) have access to colleges and universities with lower tuition and indebtedness and higher job prospects.

==== Major flagship (R1) universities ====
- University of New Mexico at Albuquerque
- New Mexico State University at Las Cruces

==== Regional state universities ====
- New Mexico Institute of Mining & Technology at Socorro
- Eastern New Mexico University at Portales
- New Mexico Highlands University at Las Vegas
- Western New Mexico University at Silver City

==== Lottery scholarship ====
New Mexico is one of eight states that fund college scholarships through the state lottery. The state requires that the lottery put 30% of its gross sales into the scholarship fund. The scholarship is available to residents who graduated from a state high school and attend a state university full-time while maintaining a GPA of 2.5 or higher. It covered 100% of tuition when it was instated in 1996, decreased to 90%, then dropped to 60% in 2017. The value slightly increased in 2018, and new legislation was passed to outline what funds are available per type of institution.

==== Opportunity scholarship ====
In 2019, New Mexico announced a plan to make tuition at its public colleges and universities free for all state residents, regardless of family income. The proposal was described as going further than any other existing state or federal plan or program at the time. In March 2022, New Mexico became the first state to offer free college tuition for all residents. The legislature passed a bipartisan bill allocating almost 1% of the budget to tuition and fees at all 29 public colleges, universities, community colleges, and tribal colleges. The program, which took effect on July 1, 2022, has been called among the nation's most ambitious and generous, as it is available to all residents regardless of income, work status, or legal status, and is provided without taking into account other scholarships and sources of financial aid.

== Culture ==
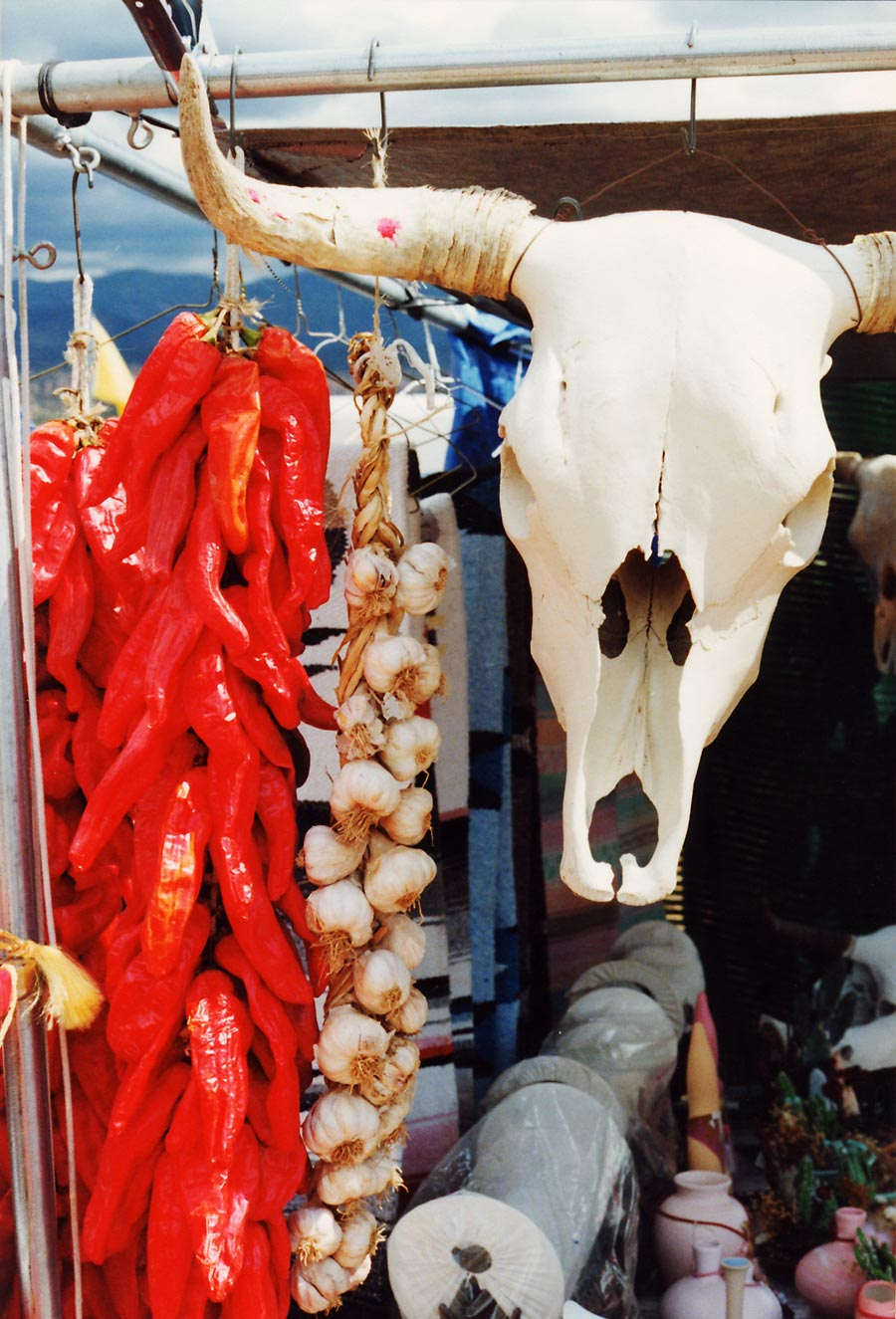
Symbols of the Southwest: a string of dried chile pepper pods (a ristra) and a bleached white cow's skull hang in a market near Santa Fe.

New Mexican culture is a fusion of indigenous, Spanish, Hispanic, and American influences. The intermingling of these diverse groups is reflected in New Mexico's demographics, toponyms, cuisine, dialect, and identity. Compared to other Western states, New Mexico's Spanish and Mexican heritage remain more visible and enduring, due to it having been the oldest, most populous, and most important province in New Spain's northern periphery. Historians allege this history has been understated or marginalized by persistent American biases and misconceptions about Spanish colonial history, reflected in part by the fact that many Americans do not know it is part of the U.S.; this misconception variably elicits frustration, amusement, or even pride among New Mexicans as evidence of their unique heritage. The Flag of New Mexico contains the Zuni sun, but with four rays rather than three.

Like other states in the American Southwest, New Mexico bears the legacy of the "Old West" period of American westward expansion, characterized by cattle ranching, cowboys, pioneers, the Santa Fe Trail, and conflicts among and between settlers and Native Americans. The state's vast and diverse geography, sparse population, and abundance of ghost towns have contributed to its enduring frontier image and atmosphere. Many fictional works of the Western genre are set or produced in New Mexico.

=== Architecture ===
Examples of New Mexico's architectural history date back to the Ancestral Puebloans within Oasisamerica. The Hispanos of New Mexico adapted the Pueblo architecture style within their own buildings, and following the establishment of Albuquerque in 1706, the Territorial Style of architecture blended the styles. Rural communities incorporated both building types into a New Mexico vernacular style, further exemplifying the indigenous roots of New Mexico. After statehood, the modern Pueblo Revival and Territorial Revival architectural styles became more prevalent, with these revival architectures becoming officially encouraged since the 1930s. These styles have been blended with other modern styles, as happened with Pueblo Deco architecture, within modern contemporary New Mexican architecture.

=== Art, literature, and media ===
The earliest New Mexico artists whose work survives today are the Mimbres Indians, whose black and white pottery could be mistaken for modern art, except for the fact that it was produced before AD 1130. Many examples of this work can be seen at the Deming Luna Mimbres Museum and at the Western New Mexico University Museum.

Santa Fe has long hosted a thriving artistic community, which has included such prominent figures as Bruce Nauman, Richard Tuttle, John Connell, and Steina Vasulka. The capital city has several art museums, including the New Mexico Museum of Art, Museum of Spanish Colonial Art, Museum of International Folk Art, Museum of Indian Arts and Culture, Museum of Contemporary Native Arts, SITE Santa Fe and others. Colonies for artists and writers thrive, and the small city teems with art galleries. In August, the city hosts the annual Santa Fe Indian Market, which is the oldest and largest juried Native American art showcase in the world. Performing arts include the Santa Fe Opera, which presents five operas in repertory each July to August; the Santa Fe Chamber Music Festival held each summer; and the restored Lensic Theater, a principal venue for many kinds of performances. The weekend after Labor Day boasts the burning of Zozobra, a fifty-foot (15 m) marionette, during Fiestas de Santa Fe.

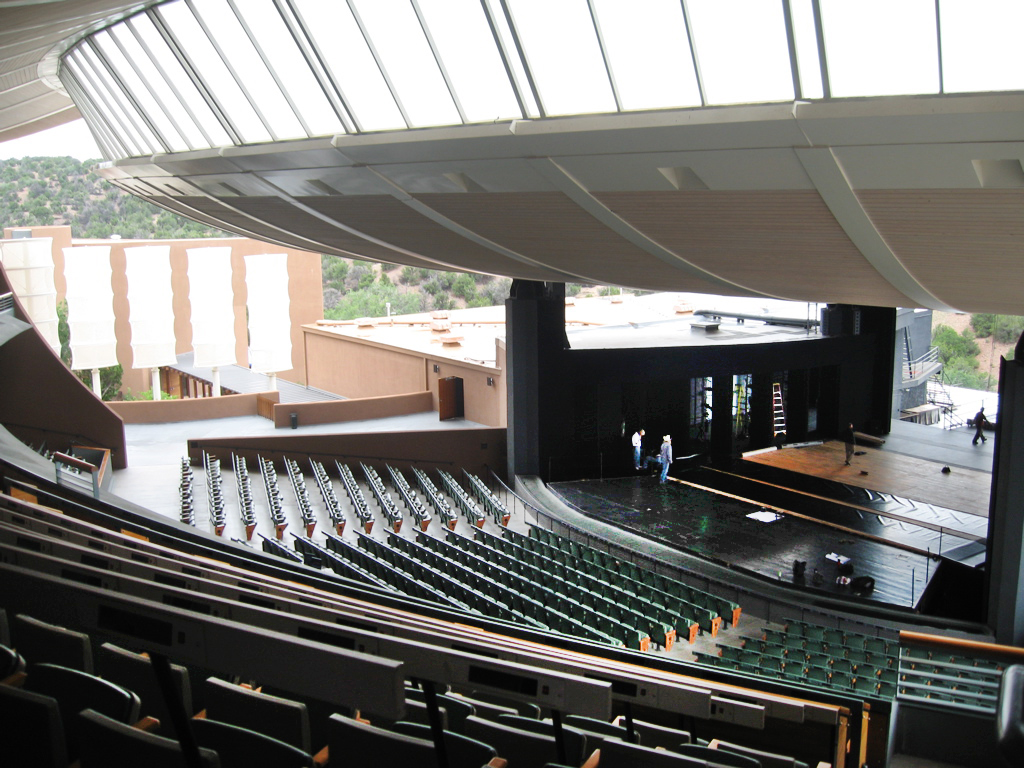
Interior of the Crosby Theater at the Santa Fe Opera, viewed from the mezzanine

As New Mexico's largest city, Albuquerque hosts many of the state's leading cultural events and institutions, including the New Mexico Museum of Natural History and Science, the National Hispanic Cultural Center, the National Museum of Nuclear Science & History, and the famed annual Albuquerque International Balloon Fiesta. The National Hispanic Cultural Center has held hundreds of performing arts events, art showcases, and other events related to Spanish culture in New Mexico and worldwide in the centerpiece Roy E Disney Center for the Performing Arts or in other venues at the 53-acre facility. New Mexico residents and visitors alike can enjoy performing arts from around the world at Popejoy Hall on the campus of the University of New Mexico. Popejoy Hall hosts singers, dancers, Broadway shows, other types of acts, and Shakespeare. Albuquerque also has the iconic KiMo Theater built in 1927 in the Pueblo Revival Style architecture. The KiMo presents live theater and concerts as well as movies and simulcast operas. In addition to other general interest theaters, Albuquerque also has the African American Performing Arts Center and Exhibit Hall which showcases achievements by people of African descent and the Indian Pueblo Cultural Center which highlights the cultural heritage of the First Nations people of New Mexico.

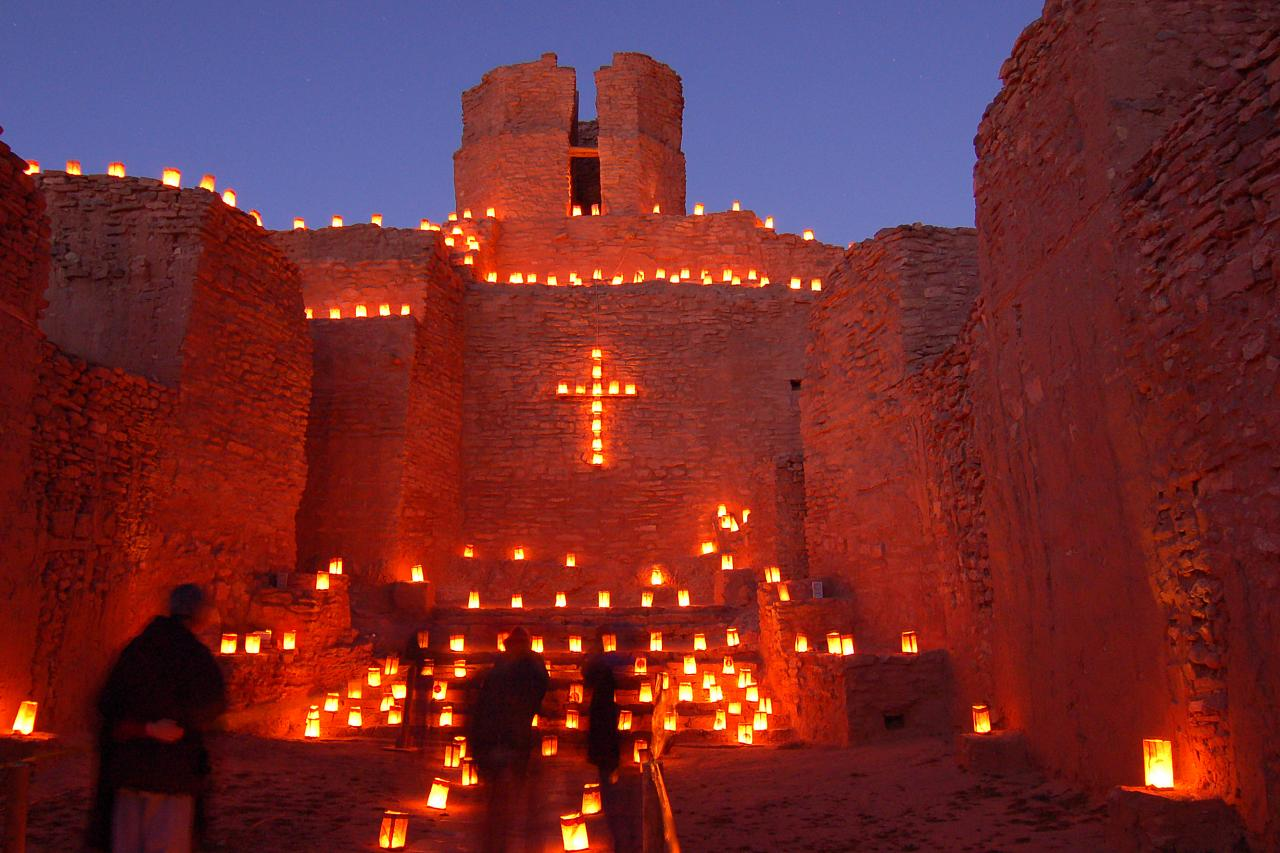
Luminarias in the old mission church, Jemez State Monument

New Mexico holds strong to its Spanish heritage. Old Spanish traditions such as zarzuelas and flamenco are popular; the University of New Mexico is the only institute of higher education in the world with a program dedicated to flamenco. Flamenco dancer and native New Mexican María Benítez founded the Maria Benítez Institute for Spanish Arts "to present programs of the highest quality of the rich artistic heritage of Spain, as expressed through music, dance, visual arts, and other art forms". There is also the annual Festival Flamenco Internacional de Alburquerque, where native Spanish and New Mexican flamenco dancers perform at the University of New Mexico; it is the largest and oldest flamenco event outside of Spain.

In the mid-20th century, there was a thriving Hispano school of literature and scholarship being produced in both English and Spanish. Among the more notable authors were Angélico Chávez, Nina Otero-Warren, Fabiola Cabeza de Baca, Aurelio Espinosa, Cleofas Jaramillo, Juan Bautista Rael, and Aurora Lucero-White Lea. D. H. Lawrence lived near Taos in the 1920s, at the D. H. Lawrence Ranch, where there is a shrine said to contain his ashes.

New Mexico's strong Spanish, Anglo, and Wild West frontier motifs have contributed to a unique body of literature, represented by internationally recognized authors such as Rudolfo Anaya, Tony Hillerman, and Daniel Abraham. Western fiction folk heroes Billy the Kid, Elfego Baca, Geronimo, and Pat Garrett originate in New Mexico. These same Hispanic, indigenous, and frontier histories have given New Mexico a place in the history of country and Western music, with its own New Mexico music genre, exemplified by Al Hurricane, Robert Mirabal, and Michael Martin Murphey.

Silver City, originally a mining town, is a major hub and exhibition center for artists, visual and otherwise. Another former mining town turned art haven is Madrid, which gained fame as the filming location for the 2007 movie Wild Hogs. Las Cruces has a museum system affiliated with the Smithsonian Institution Affiliations Program and hosts various cultural and artistic opportunities for residents and visitors.

The Western genre immortalized the varied mountainous, riparian, and desert environment on film. Owing to a combination of financial incentives, low cost, and geographic diversity, New Mexico has long been a popular setting or filming location for films and television series. In addition to Wild Hogs, movies filmed in New Mexico include Sunshine Cleaning and Vampires. Some seasons of the A&E/Netflix series Longmire were filmed in New Mexico, including in Las Vegas, Santa Fe, Eagle Nest, and Red River. The Breaking Bad franchise is set and was filmed in and around Albuquerque, a product of the ongoing success of media in the city in large part helped by Albuquerque Studios and the presence of production studios like Netflix and NBCUniversal.

=== Cuisine ===
New Mexico is known for its unique and eclectic culinary scene, which fuses various indigenous cuisines with those of Spanish and Mexican Hispanos originating in Nuevo México. Like other aspects of the state's culture, New Mexican cuisine has been shaped by a variety of influences from throughout its history; consequently, it is unlike Latin food originating elsewhere in the contiguous United States. Distinguishing characteristics include the use of local spices, herbs, flavors, and vegetables, particularly red and green New Mexico chile peppers, anise (used in bizcochitos), and piñon (pine nuts).

Among the dishes unique to New Mexico are frybread-style sopapillas, breakfast burritos, enchilada montada (stacked enchiladas), green chile stew, carne seca (a thinly sliced variant of jerky), green chile burgers, posole (a hominy dish), slow-cooked frijoles (beans, typically pinto beans), calabacitas (sautéed zucchini and summer squash), and carne adovada (pork marinated in red chile). The state is also the epicenter of a burgeoning Native American culinary movement, in which chefs of indigenous descent serve traditional cuisine through food trucks.

=== Sports ===
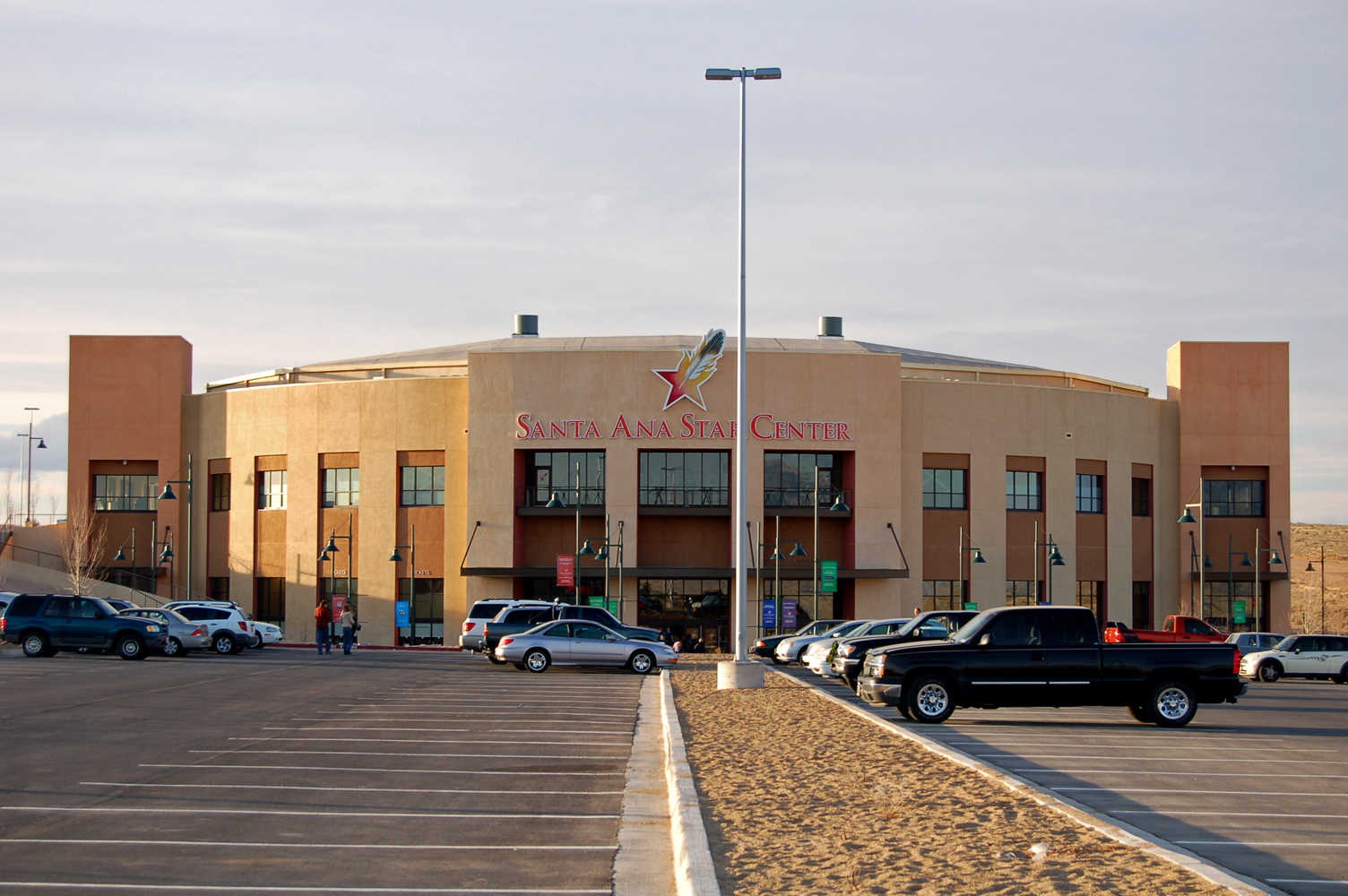
The Santa Ana Star Center

No major league professional sports teams are based in New Mexico, but the Albuquerque Isotopes are the Pacific Coast League baseball affiliate of the MLB Colorado Rockies. The state hosts several baseball teams of the Pecos League: the Roswell Invaders, Ruidoso Osos, Santa Fe Fuego, and the White Sands Pupfish. The Duke City Gladiators of the Indoor Football League (IFL) plays their home games at Tingley Coliseum in Albuquerque; the city also hosts two soccer teams: New Mexico United, which began playing in the second tier USL Championship in 2019, and the associated New Mexico United U23, which plays in the fourth tier USL League Two.

Collegiate athletics are the center of spectator sports in New Mexico, namely the rivalry between various teams of the University of New Mexico Lobos and the New Mexico State Aggies. The intense competition between the two teams is often referred to as the "Rio Grande Rivalry" or the "Battle of I-25" (both campuses are along that highway). NMSU also has a rivalry with the University of Texas at El Paso called "The Battle of I-10". The winner of the NMSU-UTEP football game receives the Silver Spade trophy.

Olympic gold medalist Tom Jager, an advocate of high-altitude training for swimming, has conducted training camps in Albuquerque at 5,312 feet (1,619 m) and Los Alamos at 7,320 feet (2,231 m).

New Mexico is a major hub for various shooting sports, mainly concentrated in the NRA Whittington Center in Raton, which is largest and most comprehensive competitive shooting range and training facility in the U.S.

=== Historic heritage ===
Owing to its millennia of habitation and over two centuries of Spanish colonial rule, New Mexico has many sites of historical and cultural significance. Forty-six locations are listed on the U.S. National Register of Historic Places, the 18th-highest total of any state.

New Mexico has nine of the country's 84 national monuments, which are sites federally protected by presidential proclamation; this is the second-highest number after Arizona. The monuments include some of the earliest to have been created: El Morro and Gila Cliff Dwellings, proclaimed in 1906 and 1907, respectively; both preserve the state's ancient indigenous heritage.

New Mexico is one of 20 states with a UNESCO World Heritage Site, and is among only eight with more than one. Excluding sites shared between states, New Mexico has the most World Heritage Sites in the United States, three being exclusively within its territory.

Since 1970, New Mexico Magazine has had a standing feature, One of Our 50 Is Missing, which relates anecdotes about instances in which people elsewhere do not realize New Mexico is a state, confuse it with the nation of Mexico, or otherwise mistake it for a foreign country. The state's license plates say "New Mexico USA" so as to avoid confusion with Mexico. New Mexico is the only state that specifies "USA" on its license plates.

== See also ==
- Climate change in New Mexico
- Economy of New Mexico
- Geology of New Mexico
- Government of New Mexico
  - Governor of New Mexico
  - List of counties in New Mexico
  - List of municipalities in New Mexico
- History of New Mexico
  - Timeline of New Mexico history
- Index of New Mexico-related articles
- List of mountain peaks of New Mexico
- List of rivers of New Mexico
- Outline of New Mexico
- Paleontology in New Mexico

== Notes ==
Preceded by Oklahoma	List of U.S. states by date of statehood Admitted on January 6, 1912 (47th)	Succeeded by Arizona
