= San Mateo Mountains =

The San Mateo Mountains may refer to:

- San Mateo Mountains (Socorro County, New Mexico)
- San Mateo Mountains (Cibola County, New Mexico) in Cibola and McKinley counties in New Mexico, which includes Mount Taylor
- San Mateo Mesa (McKinley County, New Mexico)
- the Cerrillos Hills, see Cerrillos Hills State Park, which were formerly known as the Sierra de San Mateo
