= Turquoise =

Opaque, blue-to-green mineral

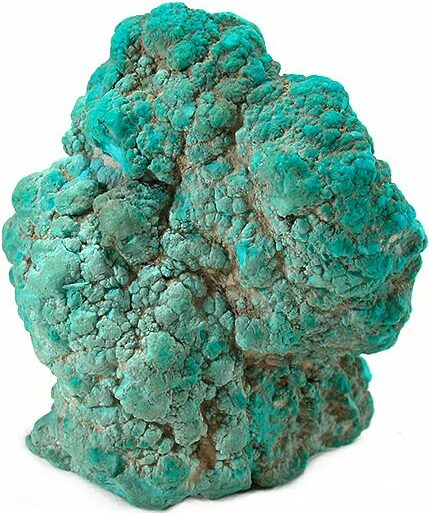

General
- Category: Phosphate minerals
- Formula: CuAl_{6}(PO_{4})_{4}(OH)_{8}·4H_{2}O
- IMA symbol: Tqu
- Strunz classification: 8.DD.15
- Crystal system: Triclinic
- Crystal class: Pinacoidal (1̅) (same H–M symbol)

Identification
- Colour: Turquoise, blue, blue-green, green
- Crystal habit: Massive, nodular
- Cleavage: Perfect on {001}, good on {010}, but cleavage rarely seen
- Fracture: Conchoidal
- Mohs scale hardness: 5–6
- Luster: Waxy to subvitreous
- Streak: Bluish white
- Diaphaneity: Opaque
- Specific gravity: 2.6–2.9
- Optical properties: Biaxial (+)
- Refractive index: n_{α} = 1.610 n_{β} = 1.615 n_{γ} = 1.650
- Birefringence: +0.040
- Pleochroism: Weak
- Fusibility: Fusible in heated HCl
- Solubility: Soluble in HCl

Turquoise is an opaque, blue-to-green mineral that is a hydrous phosphate of copper and aluminium, with the chemical formula CuAl_{6}(PO_{4})_{4}(OH)_{8}·4H_{2}O. It is rare and valuable in finer grades and has been prized as a gemstone for millennia due to its hue.

The robin egg blue or sky blue color of the Persian turquoise mined near the modern city of Nishapur, Iran, has been used as a guiding reference for evaluating turquoise quality.

Like most other opaque gems, turquoise has been devalued by the introduction of treatments, imitations, and synthetics into the market.

== Names ==
The word turquoise dates to the 16th century and is derived from the Old French turquois meaning "Turkish" because the mineral was first brought to Europe through the Ottoman Empire from the mines in the historical Khorasan province of Iran (Persia). The name is considered a misnomer, as the mineral came from Persia and is not found in Turkey. The first recorded use of turquoise as a color name in English was in 1573.

Pliny the Elder referred to the mineral as callais (from Ancient Greek κάλαϊς) and the Aztecs knew it as chalchihuitl.

In professional mineralogy, until the mid-19th century, the scientific names kalaite or azure spar were also used, which simultaneously provided a version of the mineral origin of turquoise. However, these terms did not become widespread and gradually fell out of use.

== History ==
Turquoise was mined by pre-Columbian Native Americans in deposits in New Mexico (Los Cerrillos) and likely in California as well. Additionally, it was used by the Ancient Egyptians, although not very commonly. Several turquoise artefacts, such as beads and reclining calves, have also been found in Greece, dating to the Mycenaean era (1500BC).

Turquoise mining later attracted brief European interest in the late 1800s. Prices peaked in 1890, then collapsed by 1912, ending large-scale operations. During Mohammad Khodabanda reign (1578–1587), accumulated turquoise dust from fifty years of mining in Safavid Iran was squandered lavishly, reflecting royal excess amid economic hardship, political discord, and rising factionalism among the qezelbash elite.

== Properties ==
The finest turquoise reaches a maximum Mohs hardness of just under 6, or slightly more than window glass. Characteristically a cryptocrystalline mineral, turquoise almost never forms single crystals, and all of its properties are highly variable. X-ray diffraction testing shows its crystal system to be triclinic. With lower hardness comes greater porosity. The lustre of turquoise is typically waxy to subvitreous, and its transparency is usually opaque, but may be semitranslucent in thin sections. Colour is as variable as the mineral's other properties, ranging from white to a powder blue to a sky blue and from a blue-green to a yellowish green. The blue is attributed to idiochromatic copper while the green may be the result of iron impurities (replacing copper.)

The refractive index of turquoise varies from 1.61 to 1.65 on the three crystal axes, with birefringence 0.040, biaxial positive, as measured from rare single crystals.

Crushed turquoise is soluble in hot hydrochloric acid. Its streak is white to greenish to blue, and its fracture is smooth to conchoidal. Despite its low hardness relative to other gems, turquoise takes a good polish. Turquoise may also be peppered with flecks of pyrite or interspersed with dark, spidery limonite veining.

Turquoise is nearly always cryptocrystalline and massive and assumes no definite external shape. Crystals, even at the microscopic scale, are rare. Typically the form is a vein or fracture filling, nodular, or botryoidal in habit. Stalactite forms have been reported. Turquoise may also pseudomorphously replace feldspar, apatite, other minerals, or even fossils. Odontolite is fossil bone or ivory that has historically been thought to have been altered by turquoise or similar phosphate minerals such as the iron phosphate vivianite. Intergrowth with other secondary copper minerals such as chrysocolla is also common. Turquoise is distinguished from chrysocolla, the only common mineral with similar properties, by its greater hardness.

Turquoise forms a complete solid solution series with chalcosiderite, CuFe_{6}(PO_{4})_{4}(OH)_{8}·4H_{2}O, in which ferric iron replaces aluminium.

== Formation ==
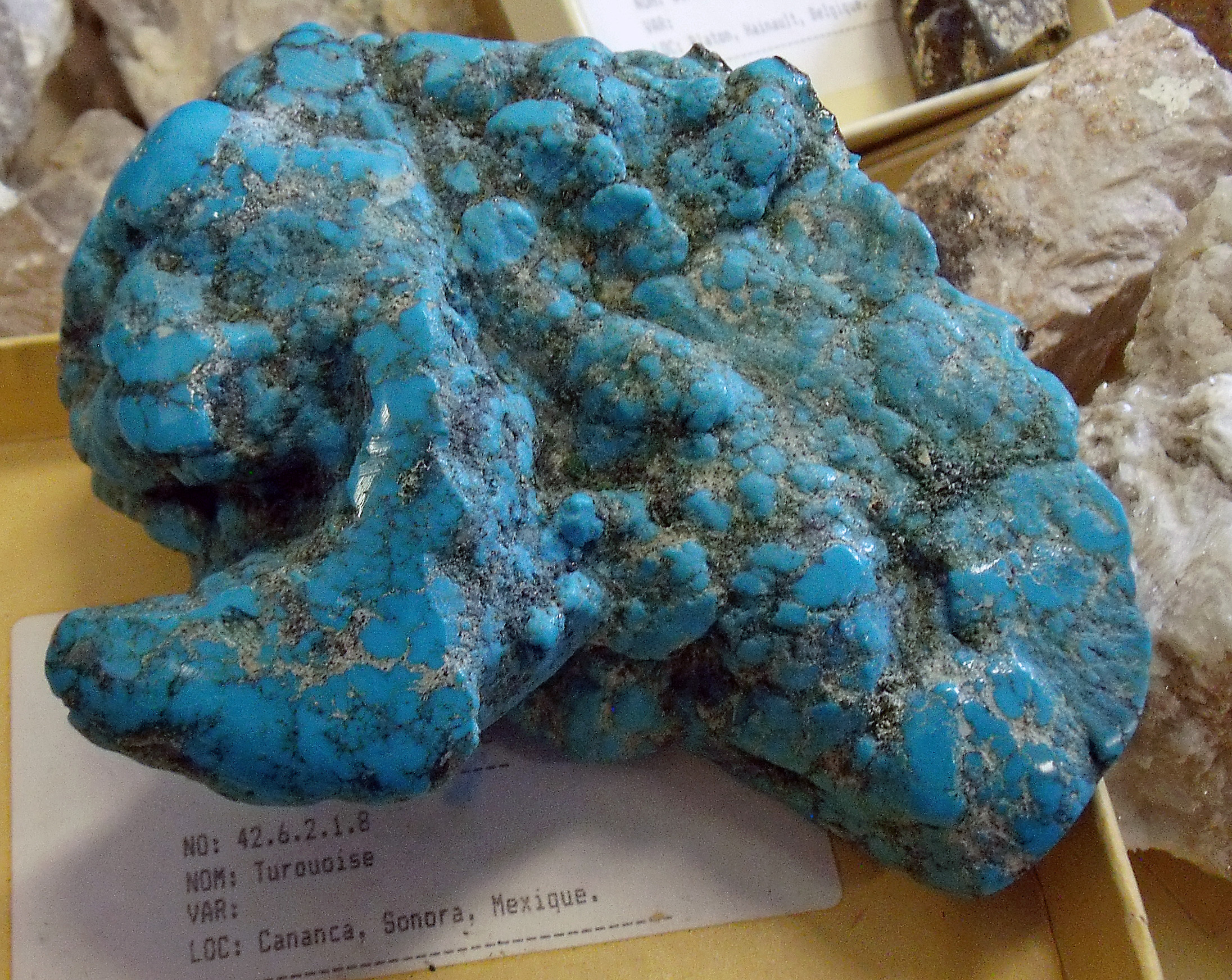
"Big Blue", a large turquoise specimen from the copper mine at Cananea, Sonora, Mexico

Turquoise deposits probably form in more than one way. However, a typical turquoise deposit begins with hydrothermal deposition of copper sulfides. This takes place when hydrothermal fluids leach copper from a host rock, which is typically an intrusion of calc-alkaline rock with a moderate to high silica content that is relatively oxidized. The copper is redeposited in more concentrated form as a copper porphyry, in which veins of copper sulfide fill joints and fractures in the rock. Deposition takes place mostly in the potassic alteration zone, which is characterized by conversion of existing feldspar to potassium feldspar and deposition of quartz and micas at a temperature of 400–600 °C (752–1,112 °F).

Turquoise is a secondary or supergene mineral, not present in the original copper porphyry. It forms when meteoric water (rain or snow melt infiltrating the Earth's surface) percolates through the copper porphyry. Dissolved oxygen in the water oxidizes the copper sulfides to soluble sulfates, and the acidic, copper-laden solution then reacts with aluminum and potassium minerals in the host rock to precipitate turquoise. This typically fills veins in volcanic rock or phosphate-rich sediments. Deposition usually takes place at a relatively low temperature, 90–195 °C (194–383 °F), and seems to occur more readily in arid environments.

Turquoise in the Sinai Peninsula is found in lower Carboniferous sandstones overlain by basalt flows and upper Carboniferous limestone. The overlying beds were presumably the source of the copper, which precipitated as turquoise in nodules, horizontal seams, or vertical joints in the sandstone beds. The classical Iranian deposits are found in sandstones and limestones of Tertiary age that were intruded by apatite-rich porphyritic trachytes and mafic rock. Supergene alteration fractured the rock and converted some of the minerals in the rock to alunite, which freed aluminum and phosphate to combine with copper from oxidized copper sulfides to form turquoise. This process took place at a relatively shallow depth, and by 1965 the mines had "bottomed" at a depth averaging just 9 meters (30 ft) below the surface.

Turquoise deposits are widespread in North America. Some deposits, such as those of Saguache and Conejos Counties in Colorado or the Cerrillos Hills in New Mexico, are typical supergene deposits formed from copper porphyries. The deposits in Cochise County, Arizona are found in Cambrian quartzites and geologically young granites and go down at least as deep as 54 meters (177 ft).

== Occurrence ==
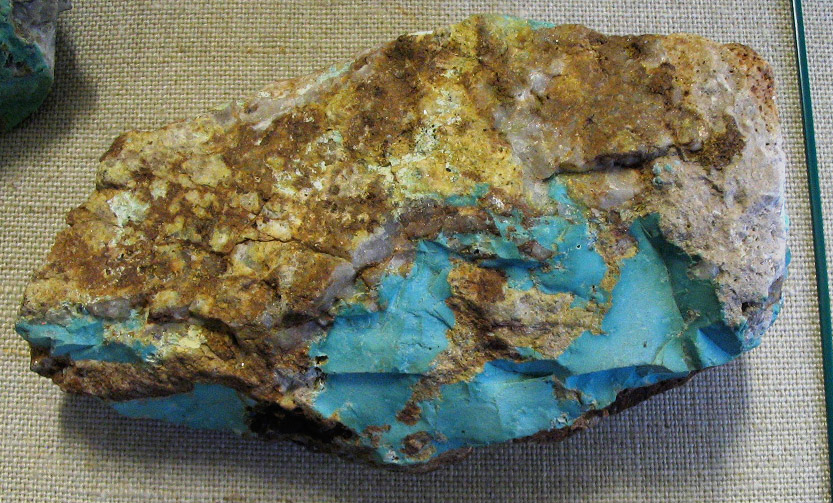
Massive Kingman blue turquoise in matrix with quartz from the Mineral Park mine, Arizona, US

Turquoise was among the first gems to be mined, and many historic sites have been depleted, though some are still worked to this day. These are all small-scale operations, often seasonal owing to the limited scope and remoteness of the deposits. Most are worked by hand with little or no mechanization. However, turquoise is often recovered as a byproduct of large-scale copper mining operations, especially in the United States.

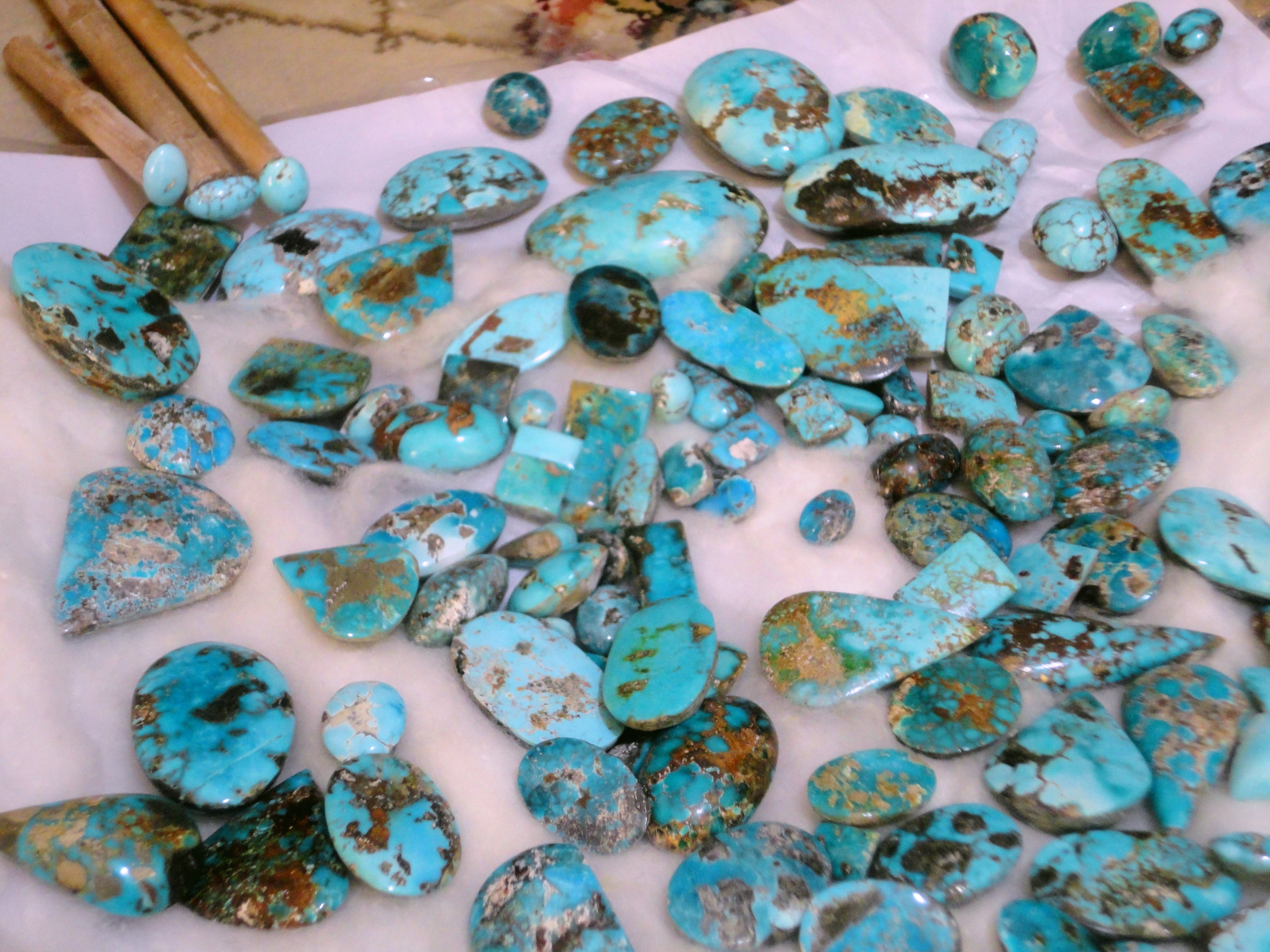
Turquoise of Madan-e Olya of Nishapur

Deposits typically take the form of small veins in partially decomposed volcanic rock in arid climates.

=== Iran ===
Iran has been an important source of turquoise for at least 2,000 years. It was initially named by Iranians "pērōzah" meaning "victory", and later the Arabs called it "fayrūzah", which is pronounced in Modern Persian as "fīrūzeh". In Iranian architecture, the blue turquoise was used to cover the domes of palaces because its intense blue colour was also a symbol of heaven on earth.

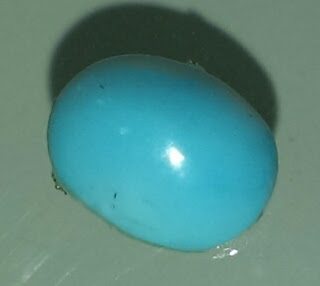
Persian turquoise from Iran

This deposit is blue naturally and turns green when heated due to dehydration. It is restricted to a mine-riddled region in Nishapur, the 2,012 m (6,601 ft) mountain peak of Ali-mersai near Mashhad, the capital of Khorasan Province, Iran. Weathered and broken trachyte is host to the turquoise, which is found both in situ between layers of limonite and sandstone and amongst the scree at the mountain's base. These workings are the oldest known, together with those of the Sinai Peninsula. Iran also has turquoise mines in Semnan and Kerman provinces.

=== Sinai ===
Since at least the First Dynasty (3000 BCE) in ancient Egypt, and possibly before then, turquoise was used by the Egyptians and was mined by them in the Sinai Peninsula. This region was known as the Country of Turquoise by the native Monitu. There are six mines in the peninsula, all on its southwest coast, covering an area of some 650 km^{2} (250 sq mi). The two most important of these mines, from a historical perspective, are Serabit el-Khadim and Wadi Maghareh, believed to be among the oldest of known mines. The former mine is situated about 4 kilometres from an ancient temple dedicated to the deity Hathor.

The turquoise is found in sandstone that is, or was originally, overlain by basalt. Copper and iron workings are present in the area. Large-scale turquoise mining is not profitable today, but the deposits are sporadically quarried by Bedouin peoples using homemade gunpowder. In the rainy winter months, miners face a risk from flash flooding; even in the dry season, death from the collapse of the haphazardly exploited sandstone mine walls may occur. The colour of Sinai material is typically greener than that of Iranian material but is thought to be stable and fairly durable. Often referred to as "Egyptian turquoise", Sinai material is typically the most translucent, and under magnification, its surface structure is revealed to be peppered with dark blue discs not seen in material from other localities.

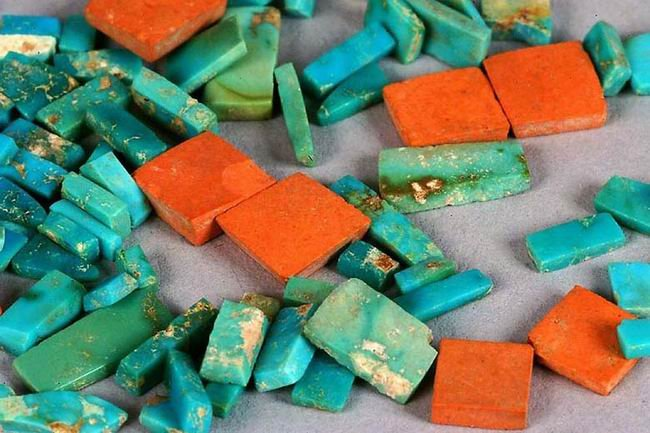
A selection of Ancestral Pueblo (Anasazi) turquoise and orange argillite inlay pieces from Chaco Canyon, New Mexico, US (dated c. 1020–1140) show the typical colour range and mottling of American turquoise. Some likely came from Los Cerrillos.

=== United States ===
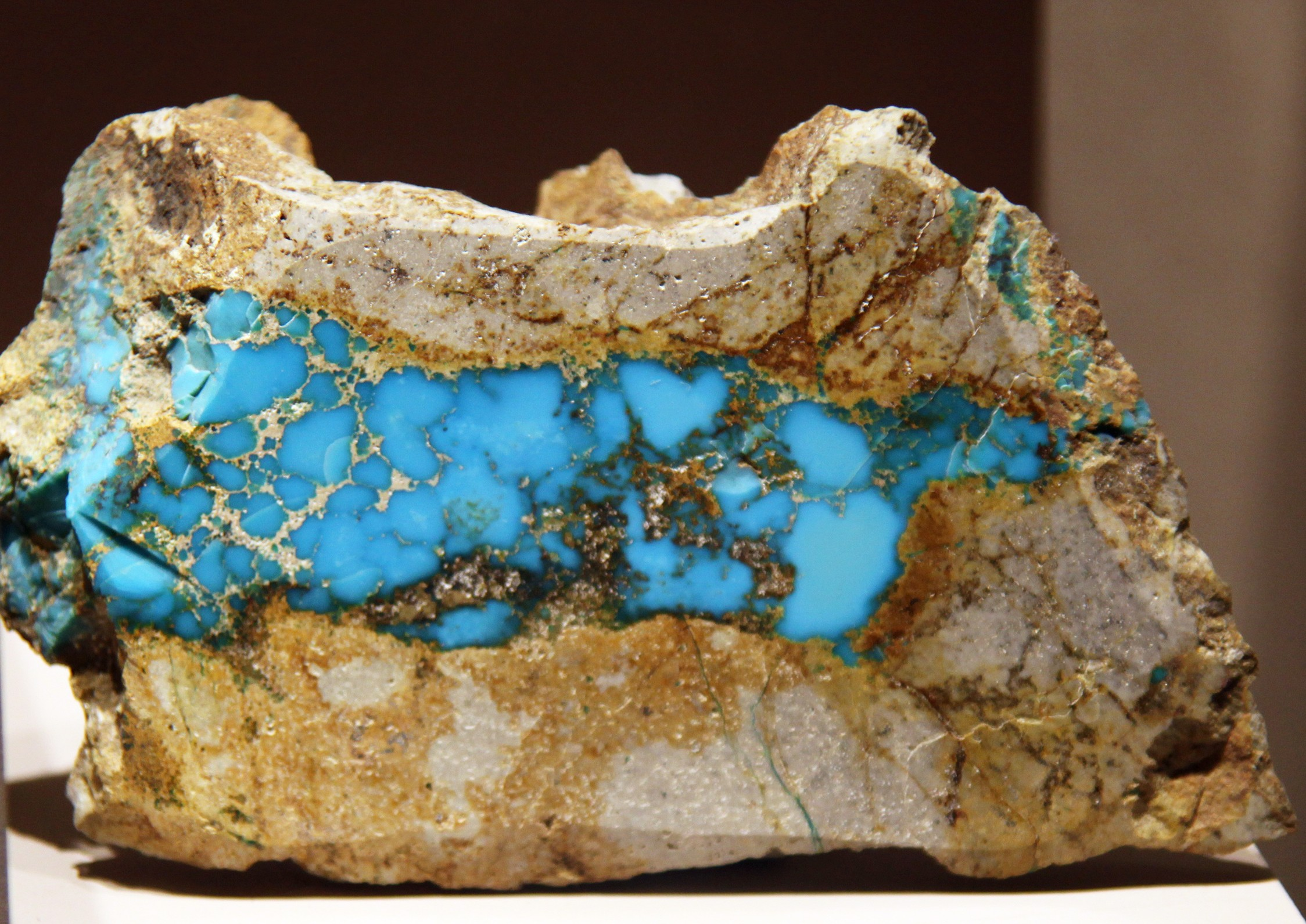
A fine turquoise specimen from Los Cerrillos, New Mexico, US, at the Smithsonian Museum. Cerrillos turquoise was widely used by Native Americans prior to the Spanish conquest.

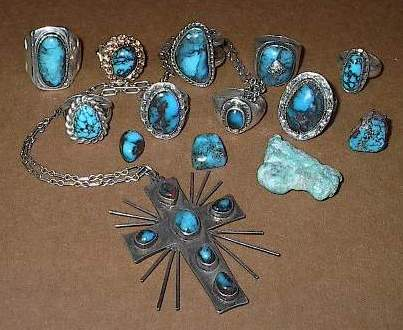
Bisbee turquoise commonly has a hard chocolate brown coloured matrix.

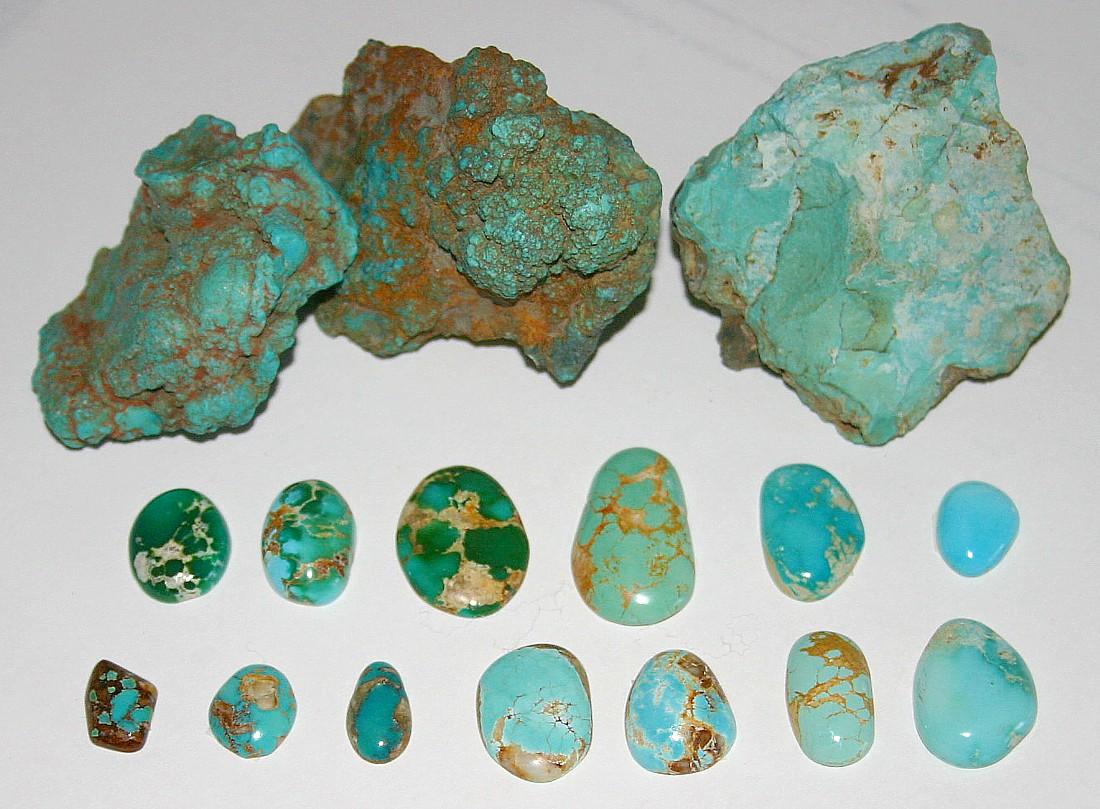
Untreated turquoise, Nevada, US. Rough nuggets from the McGinness Mine, Austin. Blue and green cabochons showing spiderweb, Bunker Hill Mine, Royston

The Southwest United States is a significant source of turquoise; Arizona, California (San Bernardino, Imperial, Inyo counties), Colorado (Conejos, El Paso, Lake, Saguache counties), New Mexico (Eddy, Grant, Otero, Santa Fe counties) and Nevada (Clark, Elko, Esmeralda County, Eureka, Lander, Mineral County and Nye counties) are (or were) especially rich. The deposits of California and New Mexico were mined by pre-Columbian Native Americans using stone tools, some local and some from as far away as central Mexico. Cerrillos, New Mexico, is thought to be the location of the oldest mines; prior to the 1920s, the state was the country's largest producer; it is more or less exhausted today. Only one mine in California, located at Apache Canyon, operates at a commercial capacity today.

The turquoise occurs as vein or seam fillings, and as compact nuggets; these are mostly small in size. While quite fine material is sometimes found, rivalling Iranian material in both colour and durability, most American turquoise is of a low grade (called "chalk turquoise"); high iron levels mean greens and yellows predominate, and a typically friable consistency in the turquoise's untreated state precludes use in jewelry.

Arizona is currently the most important producer of turquoise by value. Several mines exist in the state, two of them famous for their unique colour and quality and considered the best in the industry: the Sleeping Beauty Mine in Globe ceased turquoise mining in August 2012. The mine chose to send all ore to the crusher and to concentrate on copper production due to the rising price of copper on the world market. The price of natural untreated Sleeping Beauty turquoise has risen dramatically since the mine's closing. The Kingman Mine as of 2015 still operates alongside a copper mine outside of the city. Other mines include the Blue Bird mine, Castle Dome, and Ithaca Peak, but they are mostly inactive due to the high cost of operations and federal regulations. The Phelps Dodge Lavender Pit mine at Bisbee ceased operations in 1974 and never had a turquoise contractor. All Bisbee turquoise was "lunch pail" mined. It came out of the copper ore mine in miners' lunch pails. Morenci and Turquoise Peak are either inactive or depleted.

Nevada is the country's other major producer, with more than 120 mines which have yielded significant quantities of turquoise. Unlike elsewhere in the US, most Nevada mines have been worked primarily for their gem turquoise and very little has been recovered as a byproduct of other mining operations. Nevada turquoise is found as nuggets, fracture fillings and in breccias as the cement filling interstices between fragments. Because of the geology of the Nevada deposits, a majority of the material produced is hard and dense, being of sufficient quality that no treatment or enhancement is required. While nearly every county in the state has yielded some turquoise, the chief producers are in Lander and Esmeralda counties. Most of the turquoise deposits in Nevada occur along a wide belt of tectonic activity that coincides with the state's zone of thrust faulting. It strikes at a bearing of about 15° and extends from the northern part of Elko County, southward down to the California border southwest of Tonopah. Nevada has produced a wide diversity of colours and mixes of different matrix patterns, with turquoise from Nevada coming in various shades of blue, blue-green, and green. Some of this unusually-coloured turquoise may contain significant zinc and iron, which is the cause of the beautiful bright green to yellow-green shades. Some of the green to green-yellow shades may actually be variscite or faustite, which are secondary phosphate minerals similar in appearance to turquoise. A significant portion of the Nevada material is also noted for its often attractive brown or black limonite veining, producing what is called "spiderweb matrix". While a number of the Nevada deposits were first worked by Native Americans, the total Nevada turquoise production since the 1870s has been estimated at more than 600 short tons (540 t), including nearly 400 short tons (360 t) from the Carico Lake mine. In spite of increased costs, small scale mining operations continue at a number of turquoise properties in Nevada, including the Godber, Orvil Jack and Carico Lake mines in Lander County, the Pilot Mountain Mine in Mineral County, and several properties in the Royston and Candelaria areas of Esmerelda County.

In 1912, the first deposit of distinct, single-crystal turquoise was discovered at Lynch Station in Campbell County, Virginia. The crystals, forming a druse over the mother rock, are very small; 1 mm (0.04 in) is considered large. Until the 1980s Virginia was widely thought to be the only source of distinct crystals; there are now at least 27 other localities.

In an attempt to recoup profits and meet demand, some American turquoise is treated or enhanced to a certain degree. These treatments include innocuous waxing and more controversial procedures, such as dyeing and impregnation (see Treatments). There are some American mines which produce materials of high enough quality that no treatment or alterations are required. Any such treatments which have been performed should be disclosed to the buyer on sale of the material.

=== Other sources ===
Turquoise prehistoric artifacts (beads) are known since the fifth millennium BCE from sites in the Eastern Rhodopes in Bulgaria – the source for the raw material is possibly related to the nearby Spahievo lead–zinc ore field. In Spain, turquoise has been found as a minor mineral in the variscite deposits exploited during prehistoric times in Palazuelos de las Cuevas (Zamora) and in Can Tintorer, Gavá (Barcelona).

China has been a minor source of turquoise for 3,000 years or more. Gem-quality material, in the form of compact nodules, is found in the fractured, silicified limestone of Yunxian and Zhushan, Hubei province. Additionally, Marco Polo reported turquoise found in present-day Sichuan. Most Chinese material is exported, but a few carvings worked in a manner similar to jade exist. In Tibet, gem-quality deposits purportedly exist in the mountains of Derge and Nagari-Khorsum in the east and west of the region respectively.

Other notable localities include: Afghanistan; Australia (Victoria and Queensland); north India; northern Chile (Chuquicamata); Cornwall; Saxony; Silesia; and Turkestan.

== History of use ==
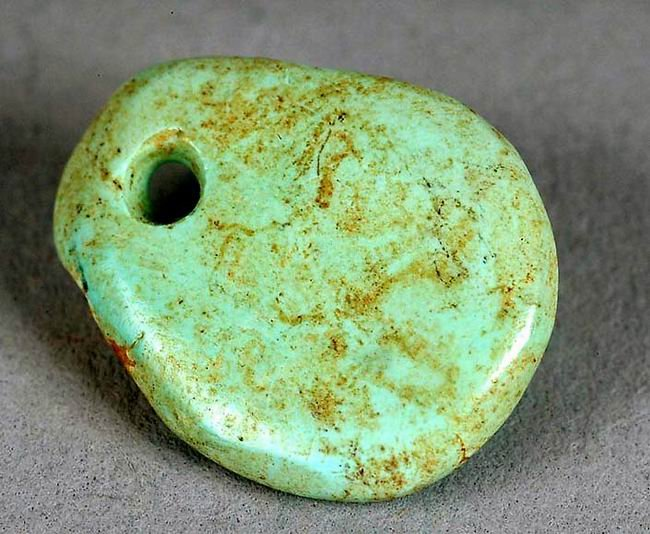
Trade in turquoise crafts, such as this freeform pendant dating from 1000 to 1040, is believed to have brought the Ancestral Pueblo people of the Chaco Canyon great wealth.

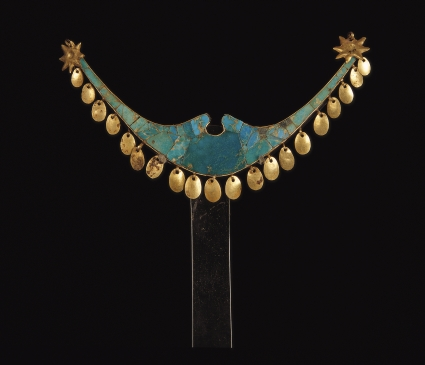
Moche turquoise nose ornament. Larco Museum Collection, Lima, Peru

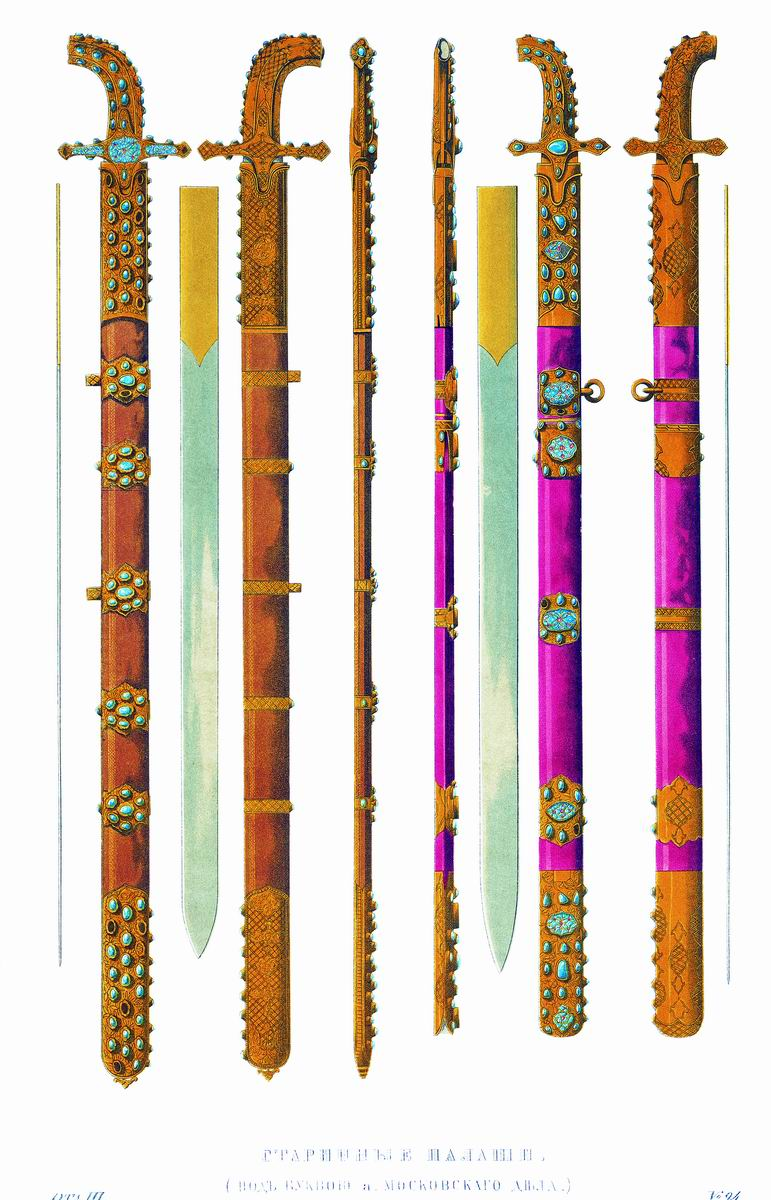
Backswords, inlaid with turquoise. Russia, 17th century

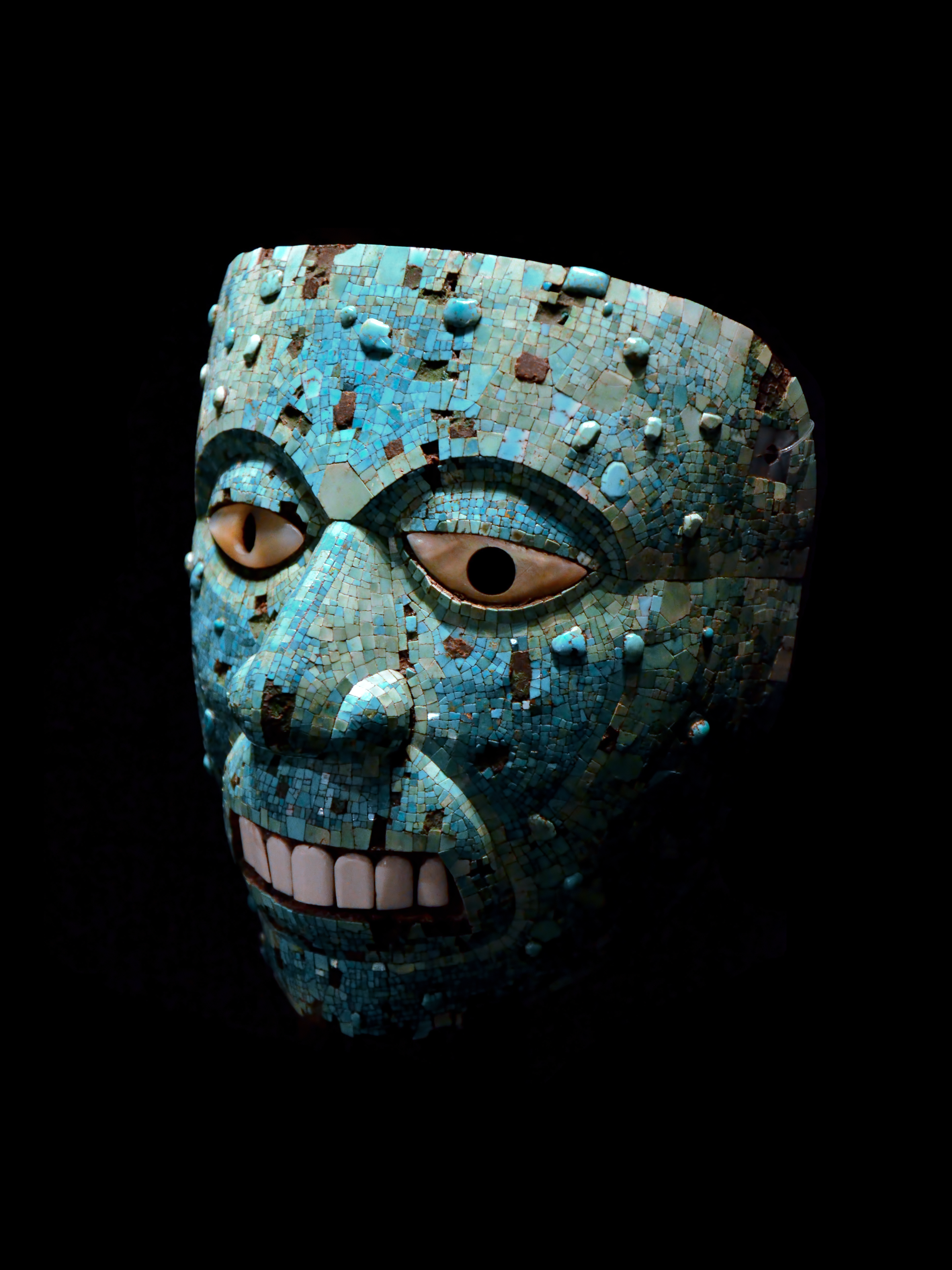
Turquoise mosaic mask of Xiuhtecuhtli, the Aztec god of fire. The Aztecs differentiated turquoise based on quality: xihuitl, a more mundane version used for decoration such as in mosaics, and teoxihuitl, a special version embued with qualities of Teotl and valued for its beauty.

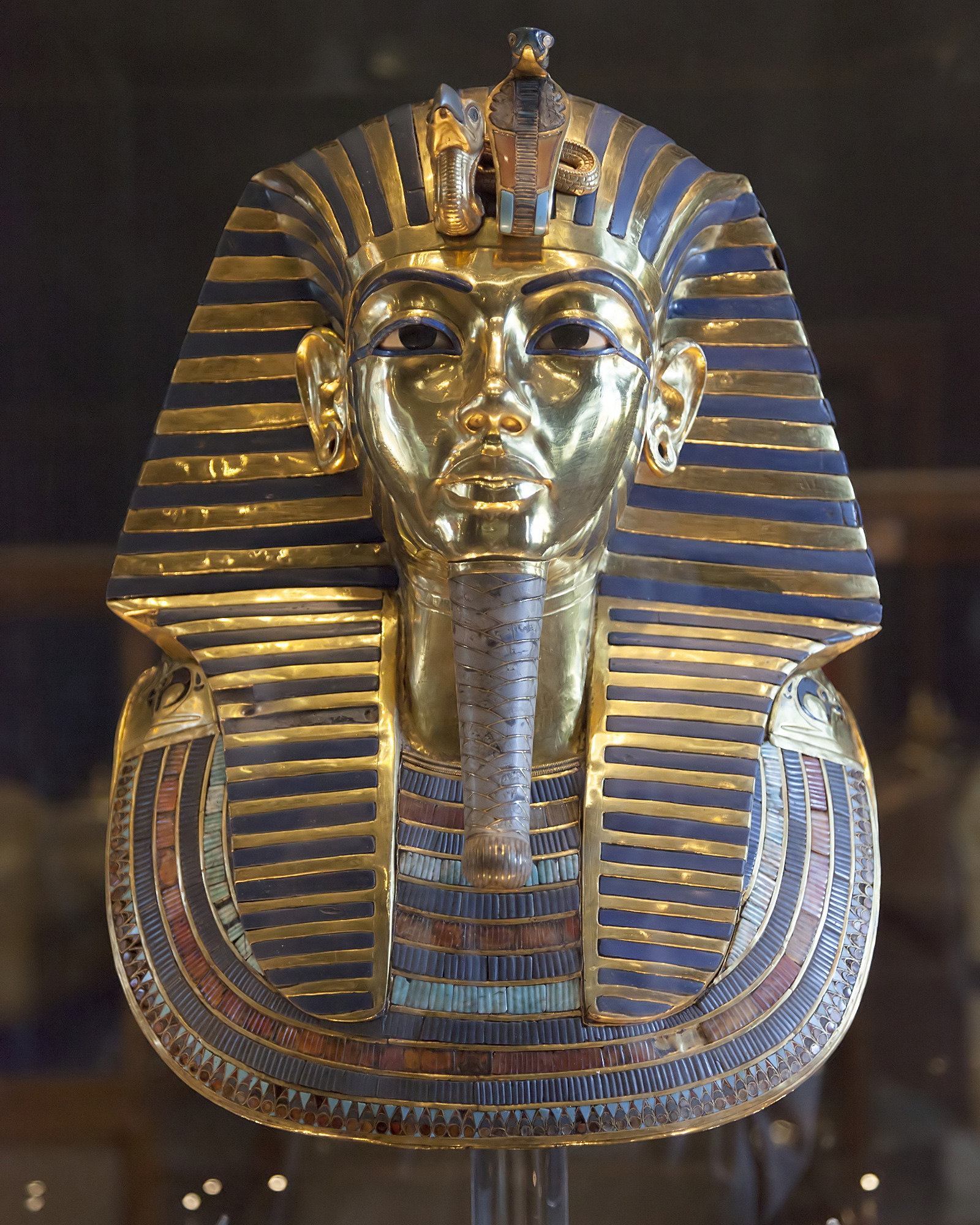
The iconic gold burial mask of Tutankhamun, inlaid with turquoise, lapis lazuli, carnelian and coloured glass

The pastel shades of turquoise have endeared it to many great cultures of antiquity: it has adorned the rulers of Ancient Egypt, the Aztecs (and possibly other Pre-Columbian Mesoamericans), Persia, Mesopotamia, the Indus Valley, and to some extent in ancient China since at least the Shang dynasty. Despite being one of the oldest gems, probably first introduced to Europe (through Turkey) with other Silk Road novelties, turquoise did not become important as an ornamental stone in the West until the 14th century, following a decline in the Roman Catholic Church's influence which allowed the use of turquoise in secular jewellery. It was apparently unknown in India until the Mughal Empire period, and unknown in Japan until the 18th century. A common belief shared by many of these civilizations held that turquoise possessed certain prophylactic qualities; it was thought to change colour with the wearer's health and protect him or her from untoward forces.

The Aztecs viewed turquoise as an embodiment of fire and gave it properties such as heat and smokiness. They inlaid turquoise, together with gold, quartz, malachite, jet, jade, coral, and shells, into provocative (and presumably ceremonial) mosaic objects such as masks (some with a human skull as their base), knives, and shields. Natural resins, bitumen and wax were used to bond the turquoise to the objects' base material; this was usually wood, but bone and shell were also used. Like the Aztecs, the Pueblo, Navajo and Apache tribes cherished turquoise for its amuletic use; the latter tribe believe the stone to afford the archer dead aim. In Navajo culture it is used for "a spiritual protection and blessing." Among these peoples turquoise was used in mosaic inlay, in sculptural works, and was fashioned into toroidal beads and freeform pendants. The Ancestral Puebloans (Anasazi) of the Chaco Canyon and surrounding region are believed to have prospered greatly from their production and trading of turquoise objects. The distinctive silver jewellery produced by the Navajo and other Southwestern Native American tribes today is a rather modern development, thought to date from around 1880 as a result of European influences.

In Persia, turquoise was the de facto national stone for millennia, extensively used to decorate objects (from turbans to bridles), mosques, and other important buildings both inside and out, such as the Medresseh-i Shah Husein Mosque of Isfahan. The Persian style and use of turquoise was later brought to India following the establishment of the Mughal Empire there, its influence seen in high purity gold jewellery (together with ruby and diamond) and in such buildings as the Taj Mahal. Persian turquoise was often engraved with devotional words in Arabic script which was then inlaid with gold.

Cabochons of imported turquoise, along with coral, was (and still is) used extensively in the silver and gold jewellery of Tibet and Mongolia, where a greener hue is said to be preferred. Most of the pieces made today, with turquoise usually roughly polished into irregular cabochons set simply in silver, are meant for inexpensive export to Western markets and are probably not accurate representations of the original style.

The Ancient Egyptian use of turquoise stretches back as far as the First Dynasty and possibly earlier; however, probably the most well-known pieces incorporating the gem are those recovered from Tutankhamun's tomb, most notably the Pharaoh's iconic burial mask which was liberally inlaid with the stone. It also adorned rings and great sweeping necklaces called pectorals. Set in gold, the gem was fashioned into beads, used as inlay, and often carved in a scarab motif, accompanied by carnelian, lapis lazuli, and in later pieces, coloured glass. Turquoise, associated with the goddess Hathor, was so liked by the Ancient Egyptians that it became (arguably) the first gemstone to be imitated, the fair structure created by an artificial glazed ceramic product known as faience.

The French conducted archaeological excavations of Egypt from the mid-19th century through the early 20th. These excavations, including that of Tutankhamun's tomb, created great public interest in the western world, subsequently influencing jewellery, architecture, and art of the time. Turquoise, already favoured for its pastel shades since around 1810, was a staple of Egyptian Revival pieces. In contemporary Western use, turquoise is most often encountered cut en cabochon in silver rings, bracelets, often in the Native American style, or as tumbled or roughly hewn beads in chunky necklaces. Lesser material may be carved into fetishes, such as those crafted by the Zuni. While strong sky blues remain superior in value, mottled green and yellowish material is popular with artisans.

== Cultural associations ==
The goddess Hathor was associated with turquoise, as she was the patroness of Serabit el-Khadim, where it was mined. Her titles included "Lady of Turquoise", "Mistress of Turquoise", and "Lady of Turquoise Country".

In Western culture, turquoise is also the traditional birthstone for those born in the month of December. The turquoise is also a stone in the Jewish High Priest's breastplate, described in Exodus chapter 28. The stone is also considered sacred to the indigenous Zuni and Pueblo peoples of the American Southwest. The pre-Columbian Aztec and Maya also considered it to be a valuable and culturally important stone.

== Imitations ==
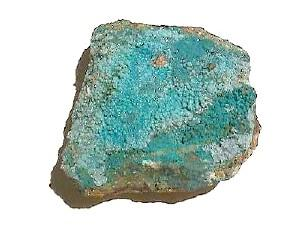
Some natural blue to blue-green materials, such as this botryoidal chrysocolla with drusy quartz, are occasionally confused with or used to imitate turquoise.

The Egyptians were the first to produce an artificial imitation of turquoise, in the glazed earthenware product faience. Later glass and enamel were also used, and in modern times more sophisticated porcelain, plastics, and various assembled, pressed, bonded, and sintered products (composed of various copper and aluminium compounds) have been developed: examples of the latter include "Viennese turquoise", made from precipitated aluminium phosphate colored by copper oleate; and "neolith", a mixture of bayerite and copper(II) phosphate. Most of these products differ markedly from natural turquoise in both physical and chemical properties, but in 1972, Pierre Gilson introduced one fairly close to a true synthetic (it does differ in chemical composition owing to a binder used, meaning it is best described as a simulant rather than a synthetic). Gilson turquoise is made in both a uniform color and with black "spiderweb matrix" veining not unlike the natural Nevada material.

The most common imitation of turquoise encountered today is dyed howlite and magnesite, both white in their natural states, and the former also having natural (and convincing) black veining similar to that of turquoise. Dyed chalcedony, jasper, and marble is less common, and much less convincing. Other natural materials occasionally confused with or used in lieu of turquoise include: variscite and faustite; chrysocolla (especially when impregnating quartz); lazulite; smithsonite; hemimorphite; wardite; and a fossil bone or tooth called odontolite or "bone turquoise", coloured blue naturally by the mineral vivianite. While rarely encountered today, odontolite was once mined in large quantities—specifically for its use as a substitute for turquoise—in southern France.

These fakes are detected by gemologists using a number of tests, relying primarily on non-destructive, close examination of surface structure under magnification; a featureless, pale blue background peppered by flecks or spots of whitish material is the typical surface appearance of natural turquoise, while manufactured imitations will appear radically different in both colour (usually a uniform dark blue) and texture (usually granular or sugary). Glass and plastic will have a much greater translucency, with bubbles or flow lines often visible just below the surface. Staining between grain boundaries may be visible in dyed imitations.

Some destructive tests may be necessary; for example, the application of diluted hydrochloric acid will cause the carbonates odontolite and magnesite to effervesce and howlite to turn green, while a heated probe may give rise to the pungent smell so indicative of plastic. Differences in specific gravity, refractive index, light absorption (as evident in a material's absorption spectrum), and other physical and optical properties are also considered as means of separation.

== Treatments ==
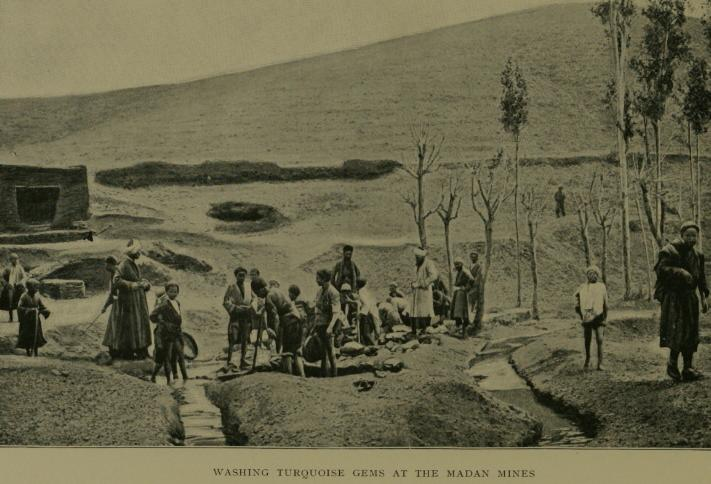
An early turquoise mine in Madan, Khorasan Province, Iran

Turquoise is treated to enhance both its colour and durability (increased hardness and decreased porosity). As is so often the case with any precious stones, full disclosure about treatment is frequently not given. Gemologists can detect these treatments using a variety of testing methods, some of which are destructive, such as the use of a heated probe applied to an inconspicuous spot, which will reveal oil, wax or plastic treatment.

=== Waxing and oiling ===
Historically, light waxing and oiling were the first treatments used in ancient times, providing a wetting effect, thereby enhancing the colour and lustre. This treatment is more or less acceptable by tradition, especially because treated turquoise is usually of a higher grade to begin with. Oiled and waxed stones are prone to "sweating" under even gentle heat or if exposed to too much sun, and they may develop a white surface film or bloom over time. (With some skill, oil and wax treatments can be restored.)

=== Backing ===
Since finer turquoise is often found as thin seams, it may be glued to a base of stronger foreign material for reinforcement. These stones are termed "backed", and it is standard practice that all thinly cut turquoise in the Southwestern United States is backed. Native indigenous peoples of this region, because of their considerable use and wearing of turquoise, have found that backing increases the durability of thinly cut slabs and cabochons of turquoise. They observe that if the stone is not backed it will often crack. Backing of turquoise is not widely known outside of the Native American and Southwestern United States jewellery trade. Backing does not diminish the value of high quality turquoise, and indeed the process is expected for most thinly cut American commercial gemstones.

=== Zachery treatment ===
A proprietary process was created by electrical engineer and turquoise dealer James E. Zachery in the 1980s to improve the stability of medium to high-grade turquoise. The process can be applied in several ways: either through deep penetration on rough turquoise to decrease porosity, by shallow treatment of finished turquoise to enhance color, or both. The treatment can enhance color and improve the turquoise's ability to take a polish. Such treated turquoise can be distinguished in some cases from natural turquoise, without destruction, by energy-dispersive X-ray spectroscopy, which can detect its elevated potassium levels. In some instances, such as with already high-quality, low-porosity turquoise that is treated only for porosity, the treatment is undetectable.

=== Dyeing ===
The use of Prussian blue and other dyes (often in conjunction with bonding treatments) to "enhance" its appearance, make uniform or completely change the colour, is regarded as fraudulent by some purists, especially since some dyes may fade or rub off on the wearer. Dyes have also been used to darken the veins of turquoise.

=== Stabilization ===
Material treated with plastic or water glass is termed "bonded" or "stabilized" turquoise. This process consists of pressure impregnation of otherwise unsaleable chalky American material by epoxy and plastics (such as polystyrene) and water glass (sodium silicate) to produce a wetting effect and improve durability. Plastic and water glass treatments are far more permanent and stable than waxing and oiling, and can be applied to material too chemically or physically unstable for oil or wax to provide sufficient improvement. Conversely, stabilization and bonding are rejected by some as too radical an alteration.

The epoxy binding technique was first developed in the 1950s and has been attributed to Colbaugh Processing of Arizona, a company that still operates today.

=== Reconstitution ===
Perhaps the most extreme of treatments is "reconstitution", wherein fragments of fine turquoise material, too small to be used individually, are powdered and then bonded with resin to form a solid mass. Very often the material sold as "reconstituted turquoise" is artificial, with little or no natural stone, made entirely from resins and dyes. In the trade reconstituted turquoise is often called "block turquoise" or simply "block".

== Valuation and care ==
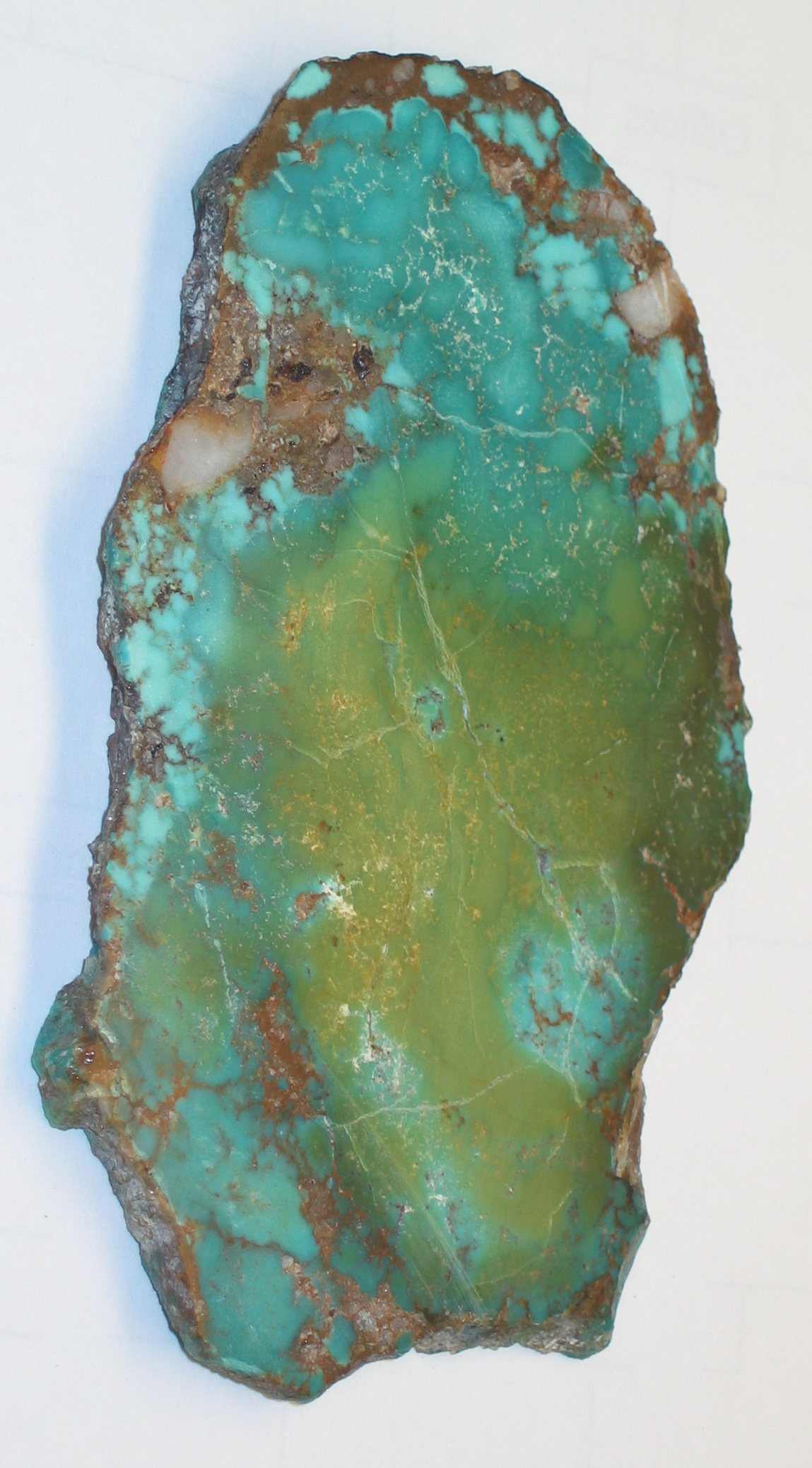
Slab of turquoise in matrix showing a large variety of different colouration

Hardness and richness of colour are two of the major factors in determining the value of turquoise; while colour is a matter of individual taste, generally speaking, the most desirable is a strong sky to robin egg blue (in reference to the eggs of the American robin). Whatever the colour, for many applications, turquoise should not be soft or chalky; even if treated, such lesser material (to which most turquoise belongs) is liable to fade or discolour over time and will not hold up to normal use in jewellery.

The mother rock or matrix in which turquoise is found can often be seen as splotches or a network of brown or black veins running through the stone in a netted pattern; this veining may add value to the stone if the result is complementary, but such a result is uncommon. Such material is sometimes described as "spiderweb matrix"; it is most valued in the Southwest United States and Far East, but is not highly appreciated in the Near East where unblemished and vein-free material is ideal (regardless of how complementary the veining may be). Uniformity of colour is desired, and in finished pieces the quality of workmanship is also a factor; this includes the quality of the polish and the symmetry of the stone. Calibrated stones—that is, stones adhering to standard jewellery setting measurements—may also be more sought after. Like coral and other opaque gems, turquoise is commonly sold at a price according to its physical size in millimetres rather than weight.

Turquoise is treated in many different ways, some more permanent and radical than others. Controversy exists as to whether some of these treatments should be acceptable, but one can be more or less forgiven universally: This is the light waxing or oiling applied to most gem turquoise to improve its colour and lustre; if the material is of high quality to begin with, very little of the wax or oil is absorbed and the turquoise therefore does not rely on this impermanent treatment for its beauty. All other factors being equal, untreated turquoise will always command a higher price. Bonded and reconstituted material is worth considerably less.

Being a phosphate mineral, turquoise is inherently fragile and sensitive to solvents; perfume and other cosmetics will attack the finish and may alter the colour of turquoise gems, as will skin oils, as will most commercial jewellery cleaning fluids. Prolonged exposure to direct sunlight may also discolour or dehydrate turquoise. Care should therefore be taken when wearing such jewels: cosmetics, including sunscreen and hair spray, should be applied before putting on turquoise jewellery, and they should not be worn to a beach or other sun-bathed environment. After use, turquoise should be gently cleaned with a soft cloth to avoid a buildup of residue, and should be stored in its own container to avoid scratching by harder gems. Turquoise can also be adversely affected if stored in an airtight container.

== See also ==
- Bisbee Blue – Turquoise from copper mines near Bisbee, Arizona, with a deep blue color
- Lapis lazuli – Metamorphic rock containing lazurite, prized for its intense blue color, with a deep blue color
- Lazurite – Alumino-silicate mineral whose blue colour is due to a sulfide species and not copper, with a deep blue color
- List of minerals
- Variscite – Hydrated aluminium phosphate of pale green color due to trivalent chromium (Cr^{3+})
