= Cerrillos =

Cerrillos may refer to:

== Argentina ==
- Cerrillos, Salta
- Cerrillos Department, Salta Province

== Chile ==
- Cerrillos, Chile
  - Cerrillos metro station

== United States ==
=== New Mexico ===
- Cerrillos Hills State Park
- Cerrillos Turquoise Mines

=== Puerto Rico ===
- Cerrillos, Ponce, Puerto Rico
- Cerrillos River, Ponce
- Cerrillos State Forest
- Lake Cerrillos

== Uruguay ==
- Cerrillos, Uruguay

== See also ==
- Los Cerrillos (disambiguation)
