= YInMn Blue =

Synthetic inorganic blue pigment

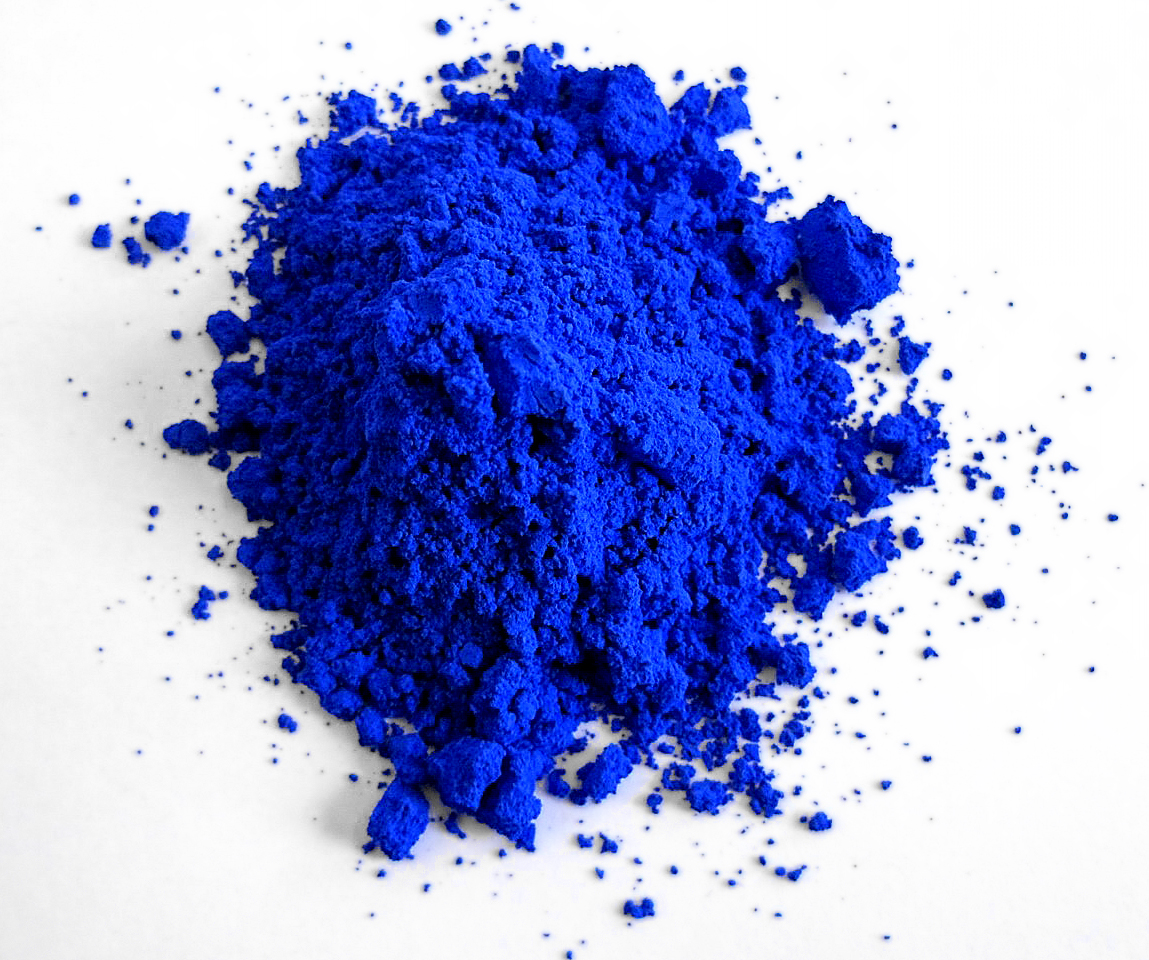
- YInMn Blue powdered pigment

Color coordinates
- Hex triplet: #306AC0
- sRGB^{B} (r, g, b): (48, 106, 192)
- HSV (h, s, v): (216°, 75%, 75%)
- CIELCh_{uv} (L, C, h): (45, 80, 255°)
- Source: (Note: The color coordinates were obtained from Smith et al. 2016 for the optimal blue pigment, which has the composition YIn_{0.8}Mn_{0.2}O_{3}. The CIELAB coordinates (L = 34.6, a = 9.6, b = −38.9 in table 1) were converted using an online tool.)
- ISCC–NBS descriptor: Deep blue
- B: Normalized to [0–255] (byte)

YInMn Blue
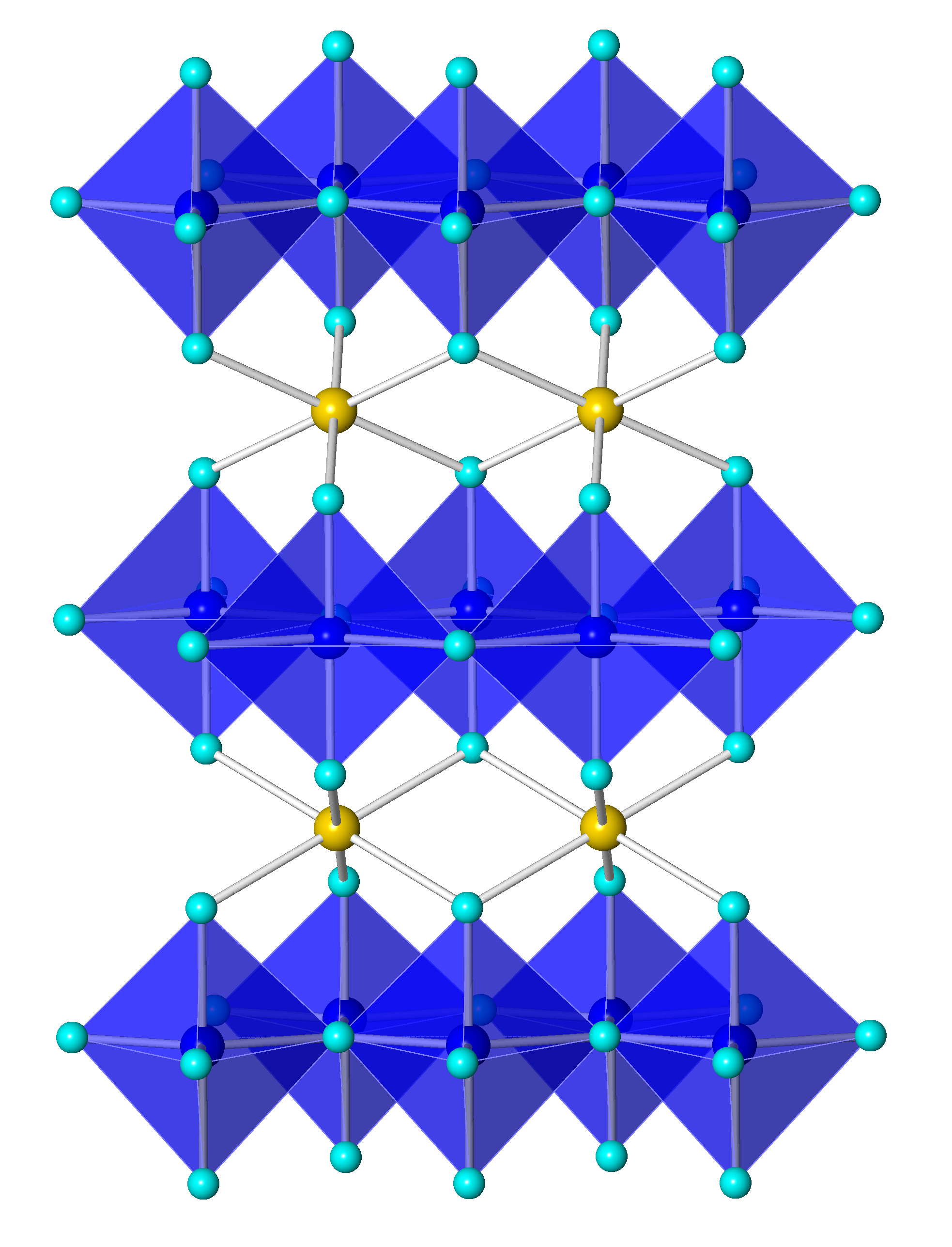
- Crystal structure of YInMn Blue

Identification
- Formula: YIn_{1−x}Mn_{x}O_{3}
- Crystal system: Hexagonal
- Crystal symmetry: P6_{3}cm
- Unit cell: a = 6.24 Å; c = 12.05 Å
- Color: Light to dark blue

YInMn Blue (/jɪnmɪn/; for the chemical symbols Y for yttrium, In for indium, and Mn for manganese), also known as MasBlue, Oregon Blue, and Subramanian('s) Blue, is an inorganic blue pigment.

== Crystal structure ==
The compound has a unique crystal structure in which trivalent manganese ions in the trigonal bipyramidal coordination are responsible for the observed intense blue color. Since the initial discovery, the fundamental principles of colour science have been explored extensively, resulting in a wide range of rationally designed novel green, purple, and orange pigments, all through intentional addition of a chromophore in the trigonal bipyramidal coordination environment.

=== Related pigments ===
Inorganic blue pigments in which manganese (in the pentavalent oxidation state and in a tetrahedral coordination) is the chromophore have been employed since the Middle Ages (e.g., the fossil bone odontolite, which is isostructural to the apatite structure). Synthetic alternatives, such as barium manganate sulfate (or Manganese Blue, developed in 1907 and patented in 1935), have been phased out industrially due to safety and regulatory concerns, hence YInMn Blue fills the niche of an inorganic, environmentally safe alternative to the traditionally used blue pigments, and offers a durable intense blue color.

== Discovery ==
In 2009, University Distinguished Professor and Milton Harris Chair of Materials Science Mas Subramanian and his then-graduate student, Andrew E. Smith, discovered YInMn Blue in the Department of Chemistry at Oregon State University. The pigment is noteworthy for its vibrant, near-perfect blue color and unusually high near-infrared reflectance. Because of Subramanian's experience at DuPont, he recognized the compound's potential use as a blue pigment and filed a patent disclosure covering the invention.

== Properties and preparation ==
The pigment is noteworthy for its vibrant, near-perfect blue color and unusually high NIR reflectance. The color may be adjusted by varying the In/Mn ratio in the pigment's base formula of YIn_{1−x}Mn_{x}O_{3}, but the bluest pigment, YIn_{0.8}Mn_{0.2}O_{3}, has a color comparable to standard cobalt blue CoAl_{2}O_{4} pigments. YInMn Blue is chemically stable, does not fade and is non-toxic. It is more durable than alternative blue pigments such as ultramarine or Prussian blue, retaining its vibrant color in oil and water, and is safer than cobalt blue, which is a suspected carcinogen and may cause cobalt poisoning.

The pigment is resistant to acids such as nitric acid, and is difficult to combust. When YInMn Blue does ignite, it burns a violet color attributed to the indium atoms.

Infrared radiation is strongly reflected by YInMn Blue, which makes this pigment suitable for energy-saving, cool coatings. It can be prepared by heating the oxides of the elements yttrium, indium, and manganese to a temperature of approximately 1,200 °C (2,200 °F).

The name "YInMn" comes from the chemical symbols for yttrium, indium and manganese. The intense blue color can be varied by adjusting the indium: manganese ratio. A range of novel green, purple, and orange pigments have been produced.

== Commercialization ==
Shepherd Color Company, AMD, Crayola, and other have participated in the commercialization. AMD announced in July 2016 that the pigment would be used on new Radeon Pro WX and Pro SSG professional GPUs for the energy efficiency that stems from its near-infrared reflecting property.

The American art supplies company Crayola announced in May 2017 that it planned to replace its retired Dandelion color (a yellow) with a new color "inspired by" YInMn. The new color does not contain any YInMn. Crayola held a contest for more pronounceable name ideas, and announced the new color name, "Bluetiful", on 14 September 2017. The new crayon color was made available in late 2017.

=== In artists' pigments ===
In June 2016, an Australian company, Derivan, published experiments using YInMn within their artist range (Matisse acrylics), and subsequently released the pigment for purchase.

As of April 2021, Golden Paints has commercially licensed and sourced the pigment, in the U.S. from Shepherd Color Company. According to Golden, the supply of the raw pigment is extremely limited. Shepherd Color Company received the required environmental and safety approvals to sell the pigment in the U.S. in 2020.

Gamblin Artists Colors made a first limited-edition batch of YInMn Blue in November 2020.

== See also ==
- International Klein Blue
- List of inorganic pigments
