= Los Cerrillos =

Los Cerrillos may refer to:

- Los Cerrillos, New Mexico, Santa Fe County, New Mexico, USA
- Cerrillos, Uruguay, Canelones Department, Uruguay
- Los Cerrillos, Argentina, San Javier Department, Córdoba, Argentina
- Los Cerrillos Airport, located in Santiago de Chile, Chile

== See also ==
- Cerrillos (disambiguation)
