= Los Cerrillos, New Mexico =

- CDP
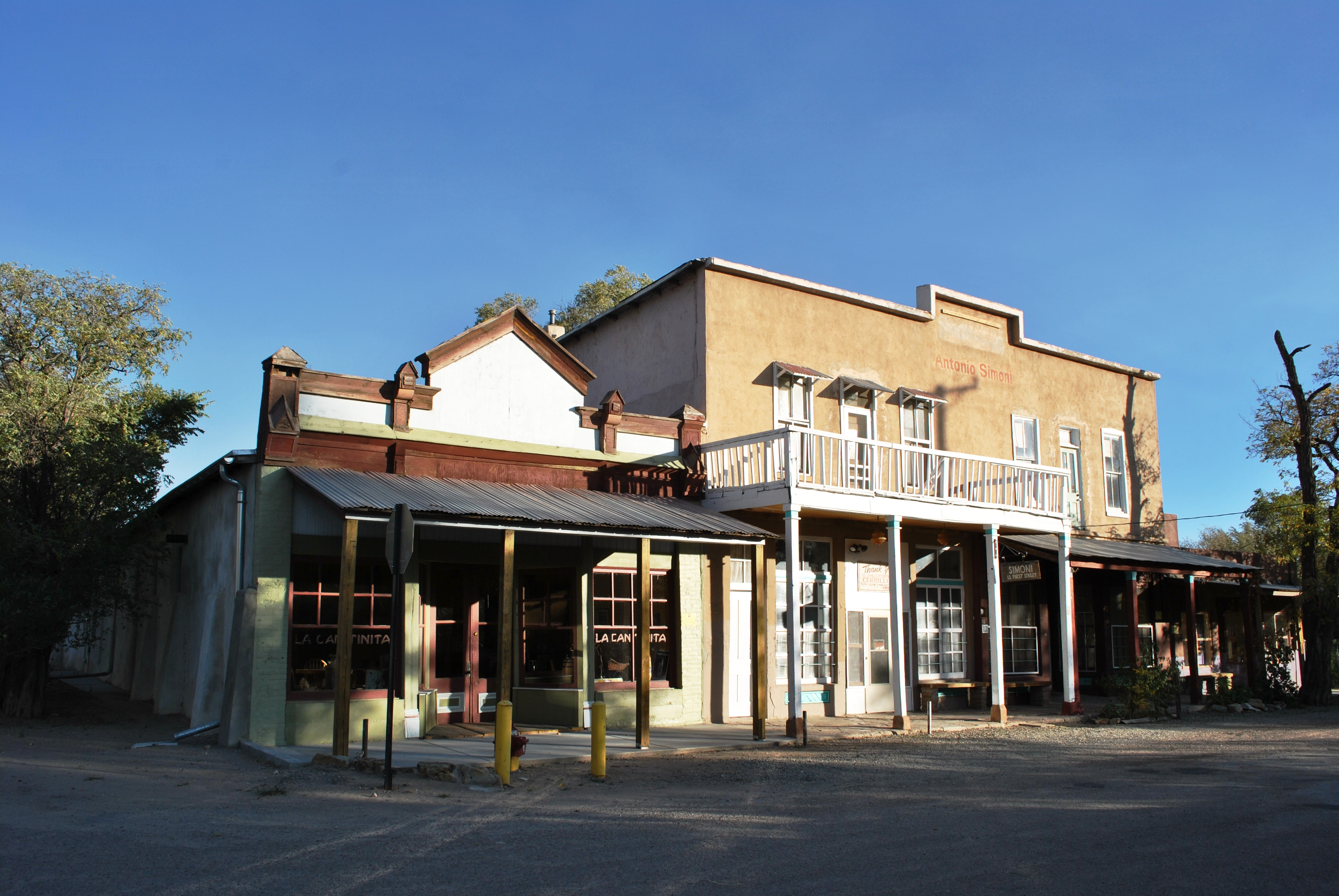
- Historic Antonio Simoni store, Cerrillos

- Location of Los Cerrillos, New Mexico

- Location in the United States
- Coordinates: 35°25′45″N 106°07′36″W
- Country: United States
- State: New Mexico
- County: Santa Fe

Area
  - Total: 3.37 sq mi (8.72 km^{2})
  - Land: 3.37 sq mi (8.72 km^{2})
  - Water: 0 sq mi (0.00 km^{2})
- Elevation: 5,758 ft (1,755 m)

Population (2020)
  - Total: 258
  - Density: 77/sq mi (29.6/km^{2})
- Time zone: UTC-7 (Mountain (MST))
  - Summer (DST): UTC-6 (MDT)
- ZIP codes: 87010
- Area code: 505
- FIPS code: 35-42600
- GNIS feature ID: 2408135

Los Cerrillos ("the hills" (Note: sometimes called simply Cerrillos ("hills") especially by local residents; see, for example, the sign over the door at Cerrillos store.jpg)) is a census-designated place (CDP) in Santa Fe County, New Mexico, United States. It is part of the Santa Fe, New Mexico Metropolitan Statistical Area. As of the 2020 census, Los Cerrillos had a population of 258. Cerrillos is accessible from State Highway 14 which is known as The Turquoise Trail south of Santa Fe due to local deposits; the road, known as Cerrillos Road in the Santa Fe city limits, continues southerly to Albuquerque.

There are several shops and galleries, a post office, and the Cerrillos Hills State Park, which has five miles of hiking trails. The Cerrillos Turquoise Mining Museum contains hundreds of artifacts from the American Old West and the Cerrillos Mining District. It also displays cardboard cutouts of characters from the film Young Guns and information on other movies which have been filmed in and around Cerrillos.

== History ==
The first, confirmable human presence on the Galisteo River occurred around 10,500 years ago. Over the centuries, both large and small communities spread throughout the Galisteo Basin. Archeological evidence of pre-Columbian human inhabitants includes pottery, vases, cups, eating and cooking utensils, stone hammers, wedges, mauls, and religious items.

The Ancestral Puebloans began mining Cerrillos turquoise in approximately 700-900 AD. There is evidence of established long-term settlements dating back to the 13th century, includes pit-house villages. In the 14th century, there was increased upheaval and conflict between communities, including the burning of the Burnt Corn Ruin. During the 15th century, an influx of Apache and Navajo in the Galisteo Basin influenced and impacted the Puebloans. By the time Francisco Vázquez de Coronado arrived in the region, circa 1540–42, a number of indigenous settlements were abandoned.

Mining in the Cerrillos Hills continued with the arrival of Spanish colonizers. The Native peoples were used for slave labor to mine these materials out of the hills under Spanish colonial rule. In 1581, the Spanish identified lead-silver deposits in “Sierra de San Mateo,” the modern Cerrillos Hills. At the turn of the 17th century, the Spanish permanently settled in the area. During the 1660s, however, a drought put economic pressure on the Spanish, while Puebloans abandoned settlements and Plains Indians conducted raids. A Spanish explorer, Antonio de Espejo, wrote about these treasures being mined at a place of “little hills." This is the source of Cerrillos' name.

In 1680, a landslide occurred in the hills, causing mines to cave in and bury about 25 miners. When the Spanish attempted to restart mining operations, the Native workers revolted. Around 1695-1696 Diego de Vargas appointed Alonso Rael de Aguilar as alcalde of the mining camp El Real de Los Cerrillos. However, tumultuous events in the late 17th century – drought, smallpox, and ongoing raids – effectively ended Native turquoise mining. The Tewa people left the area, though there were efforts in the early 18th century to repopulate with reassembled Tanos.

During the 18th century, the Spanish continued to register land grants and mine claims in the area. The earliest well-documented Spanish mine claim was registered in 1709 by General Don Juan de Ulibarri. After Mexican Independence, restrictions on foreign visitors in New Mexico were lifted in 1821, increasing trade. Following the end of the Mexican–American War in 1848, the US Government manipulated land grants to make it easier for Anglo-Americans to purchase land. Between 1846 and 1869, the Cerrillos Hills were claimed by the Baca y Delgado Family Land Grant. In 1870, the US Government rejected the family's grant claim and made the land available for public purchase.

In 1871, Stephen B. Elkins purchased 606 acres of US Government land located along the Galisteo River. He planned to build a mining town on the railroad. In the same year, Elkins gained ownership of the Ortiz Mining Grant, which contained coal deposits. Frank Dimmick and Robert Hart registered their Bonanza #3 claim in the Cerrillos Hills on January 15, 1879. The two Colorado miners set up camp and by 1880 there were five camps with a combined population of between 1,200 and 1,500 people. Further discovery of precious metal deposits led to increased immigration and an economic boom. Eventually, there were over 2,000 Territorial mines established in the hills. March 8, 1880 was declared Cerrillos Founder's Day. In addition to turquoise, the mines produced gold, copper, silver, galena, manganese, and iron.

Cerrillos Station was connected to the railway on February 15, 1880. The main line of the Atchison, Topeka and Santa Fe Railway ran within only three miles of Los Cerrillos. The rapid growth of Cerrillos gave opportunities to people who moved in. During the 1880s, the rate of development increased around Cerrillos Station and saloons, a school, churches, stores, and hotels were built.

In either 1899 or 1901, electricity was first supplied to the town of Cerillos by the Cochiti Gold Mining Company electric plant in Madrid, New Mexico. Telephone lines arrived in 1905. By 1900, the mines began to shut down. The population of the area dwindled during the Great Depression and World War II. In 1961, the Cerrillos primary school was closed due to shrinking enrollment and financial difficulties.

Today, only a few of the buildings from Cerrillos' boom remain. Some of the buildings still show evidence of past movies filmed ("Young Guns" and "Outrageous Fortune") on Main Street. In January 2000, Santa Fe County purchased 1,116 acres of the Cerrillos Hills and created the Santa Fe County Cerrillos Hills Historic Park. In 2009, the park was renamed Cerrillos Hills State Park.

== Geography ==
According to the United States Census Bureau, the CDP has a total area of 1.4 square miles (3.6 km^{2}), all land.

== Demographics ==
Historical population
Census	Pop.	Note	%±
2020	258		—
U.S. Decennial Census

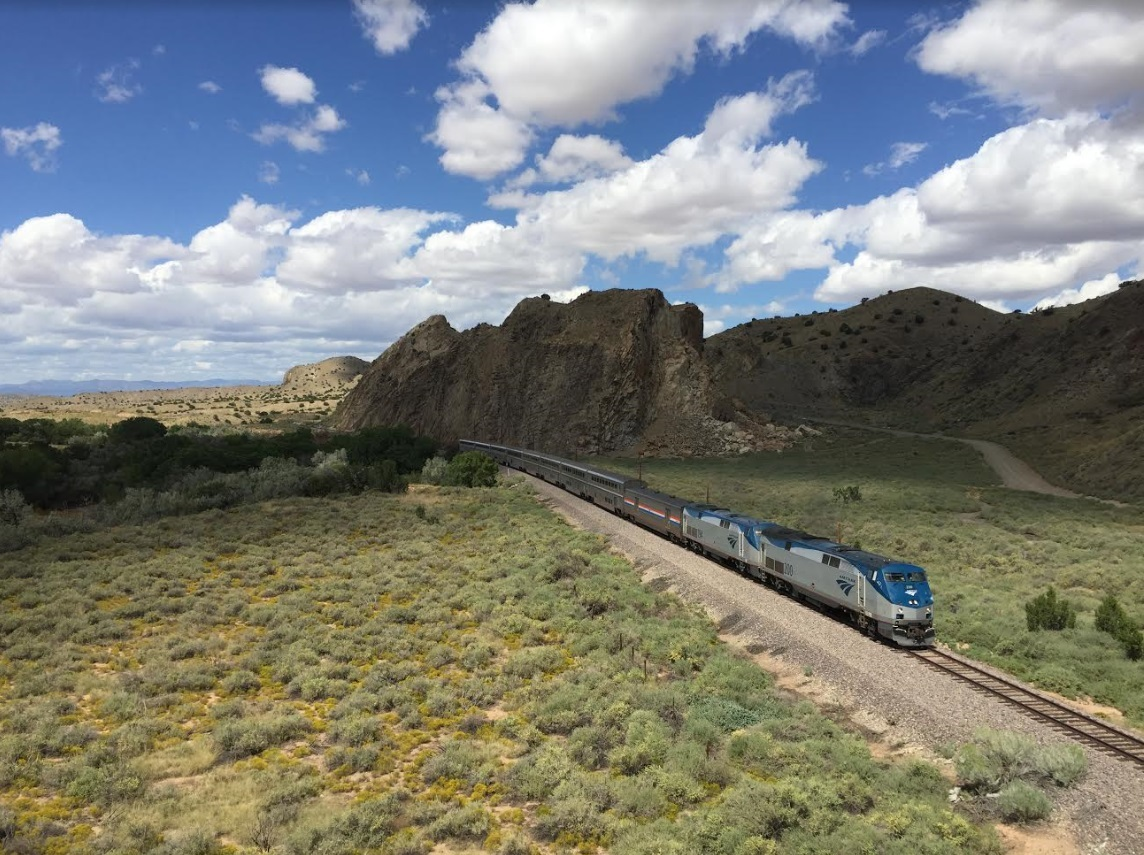
Amtrak's Southwest Chief train passing Devil's Throne, an igneous intrusion rising to an altitude of 5,638 ft (1,718 m) approximately 3/4 mi (1.2 km) northwest of Los Cerrillos (2017)

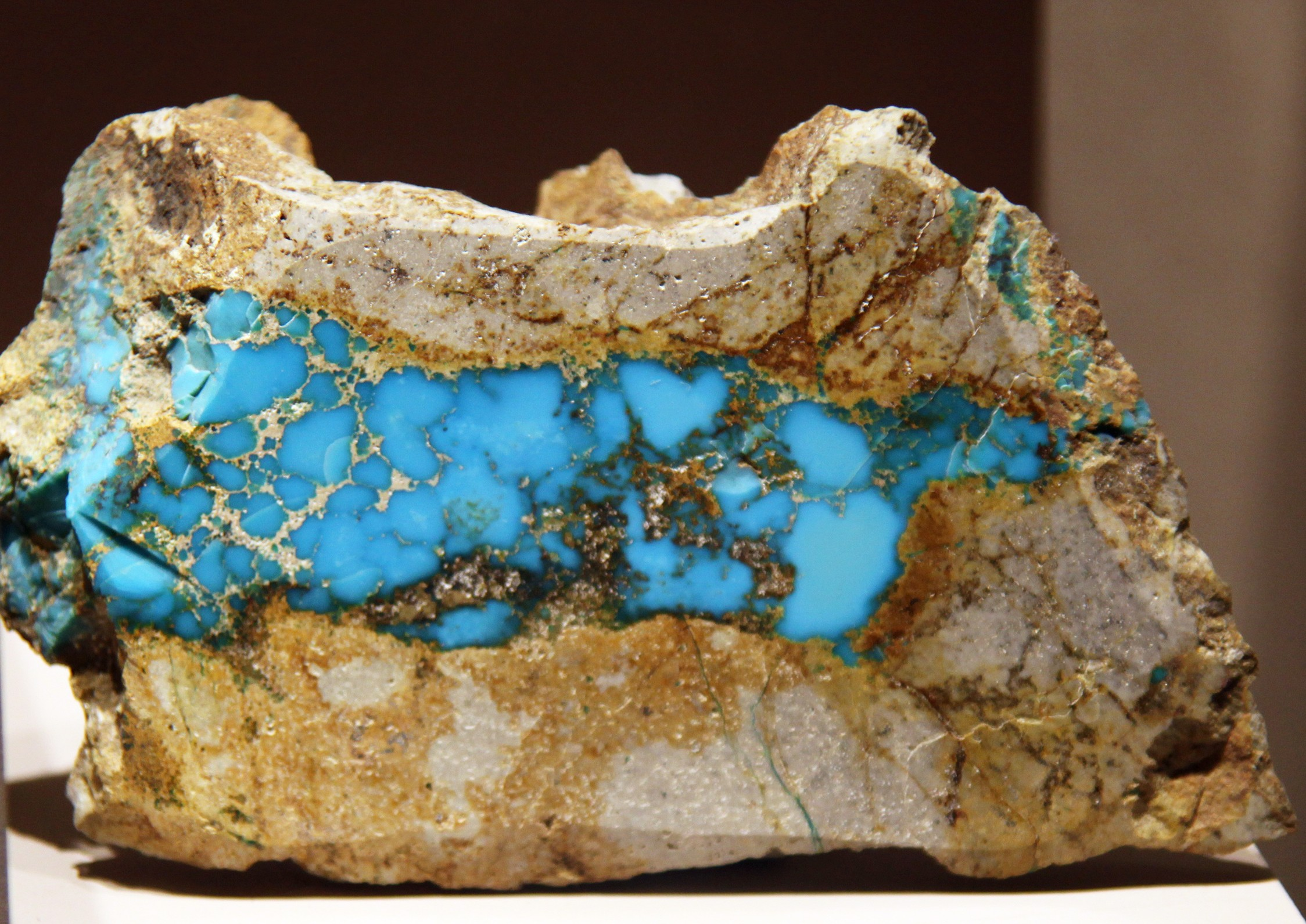
A fine Cerrillos Turquoise specimen at the Smithsonian

As of the census of 2000, there were 229 people, 111 households, and 59 families residing in the CDP. The population density was 164.5 inhabitants per square mile (63.5/km^{2}). There were 129 housing units at an average density of 92.7 per square mile (35.8/km^{2}). The racial makeup of the CDP was 79.04% White, 0.44% Native American, 0.44% Asian, 16.16% from other races, and 3.93% from two or more races. Hispanic or Latino of any race were 50.66% of the population.

There were 111 households, out of which 21.6% had children under the age of 18 living with them, 42.3% were married couples living together, 7.2% had a female householder with no husband present, and 46.8% were non-families. 41.4% of all households were made up of individuals, and 7.2% had someone living alone who was 65 years of age or older. The average household size was 2.06 and the average family size was 2.83.

In the CDP, the population was spread out, with 17.9% under the age of 18, 2.2% from 18 to 24, 31.9% from 25 to 44, 33.2% from 45 to 64, and 14.8% who were 65 years of age or older. The median age was 44 years. For every 100 females, there were 99.1 males. For every 100 females ages 18 and over, there were 106.6 males.

The median income for a household in the CDP was $13,661, and the median income for a family was $31,161. Males had a median income of $30,446 versus $31,250 for females. The per capita income for the CDP was $14,215. About 25.9% of families and 18.4% of the population were below the poverty line, including none of those under the age of eighteen or sixty-five or over.

== Education ==
It is within Santa Fe Public Schools.

It is zoned to Amy Biehl Elementary School, Milagro Middle School, and Santa Fe High School.

Previously it was zoned to Capital High School. In 2017 the district recommended changing the boundary of the area to Santa Fe High.

== See also ==
- List of census-designated places in New Mexico
- Cerrillos Turquoise Mines
