= Odontolite =

Type of fossil bone or ivory

General
- Category: Phosphate minerals
- Formula: Ca_{5}(PO_{4})_{3}[F, OH, Cl] Fe^{2+}_{3}(PO_{4})_{2}·8H_{2}O
- Strunz classification: 8.DD.15
- Crystal system: Triclinic
- Crystal class: Pinacoidal (1̅) (same H–M symbol)

Identification
- Colour: Turquoise, blue, blue-green, green
- Crystal habit: Massive, nodular
- Cleavage: Perfect on {001}, good on {010}, but cleavage rarely seen
- Fracture: Conchoidal
- Mohs scale hardness: 5
- Luster: Waxy to subvitreous
- Streak: Bluish white
- Diaphaneity: Opaque
- Specific gravity: 3–3,2
- Optical properties: Biaxial (+)
- Refractive index: n_{α} = 1.610 n_{β} = 1.615 n_{γ} = 1.650
- Birefringence: +0.040
- Pleochroism: Weak
- Fusibility: Fusible in heated HCl
- Solubility: Soluble in HCl

Odontolite, also called bone turquoise or fossil turquoise or occidental turquoise, is fossil bone or ivory that has been traditionally thought to have been altered by turquoise or similar phosphate minerals such as vivianite.
