= Spahievo =

- Village
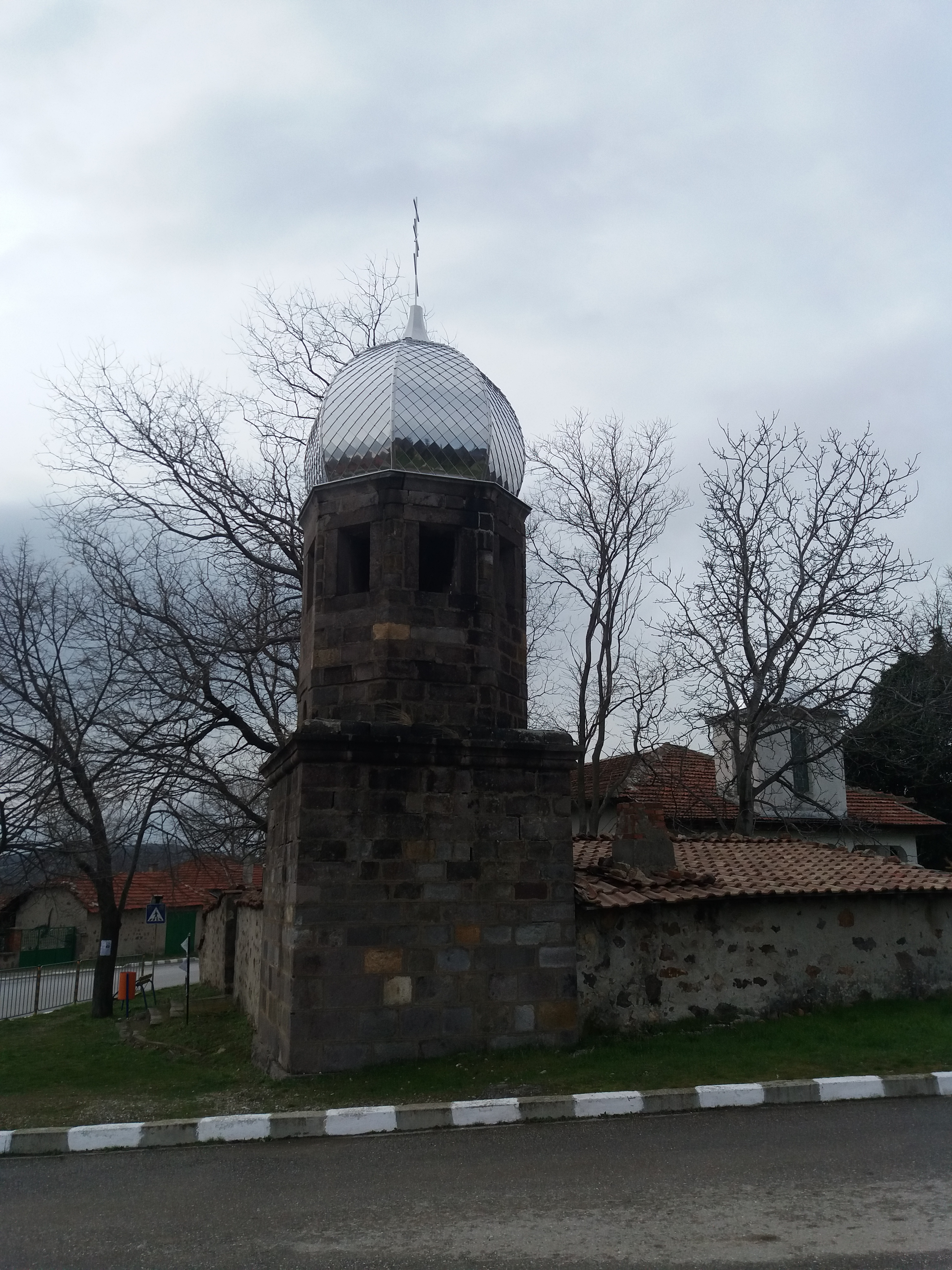

- Location in Bulgaria
- Coordinates: 41°53′50″N 25°19′45″E
- Country: Bulgaria
- Province: Haskovo Province
- Municipality: Mineralni bani
- Time zone: UTC+2 (EET)
  - Summer (DST): UTC+3 (EEST)

Spahievo is a village in the municipality of Mineralni bani, in Haskovo Province, in southern Bulgaria.
