= San Mateo Mesa (McKinley County, New Mexico) =

Mesas of New Mexico, US

Coordinates: 35°25′38″N 107°44′46″W

San Mateo Mesa is located in McKinley County, New Mexico, approximately 5 miles northwest of San Mateo. There are two large mesas, called San Mateo Mesa South and San Mateo Mesa North.

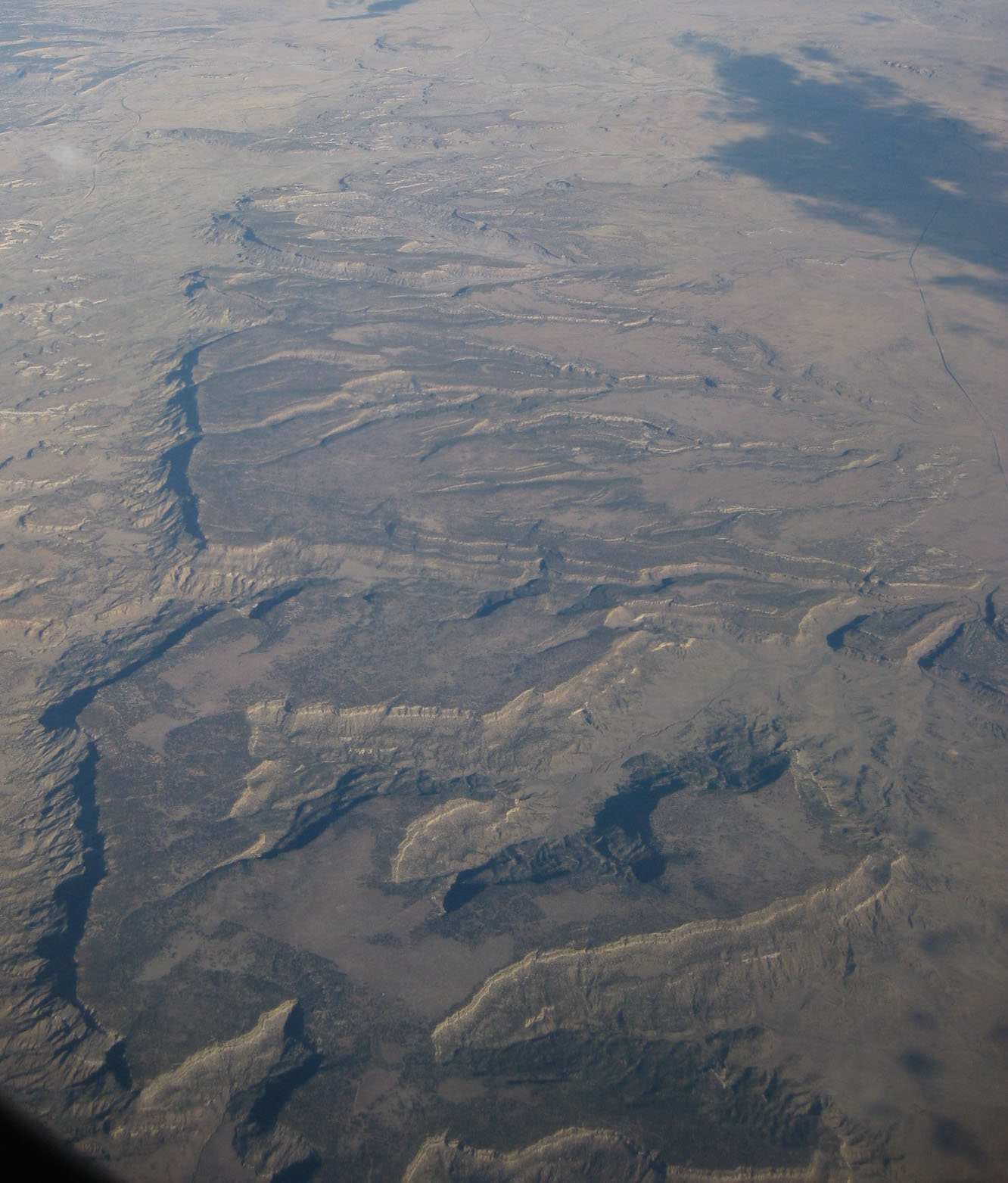
Oblique air photo of San Mateo Mesas, facing northwest in August 2011

== Geology ==
The mesas are capped by the Upper Cretaceous Point Lookout Sandstone, which is underlain by the Crevasse Canyon Formation.
