= Conchoidal fracture =

Brittle fracture surface that does not follow any natural planes of separation

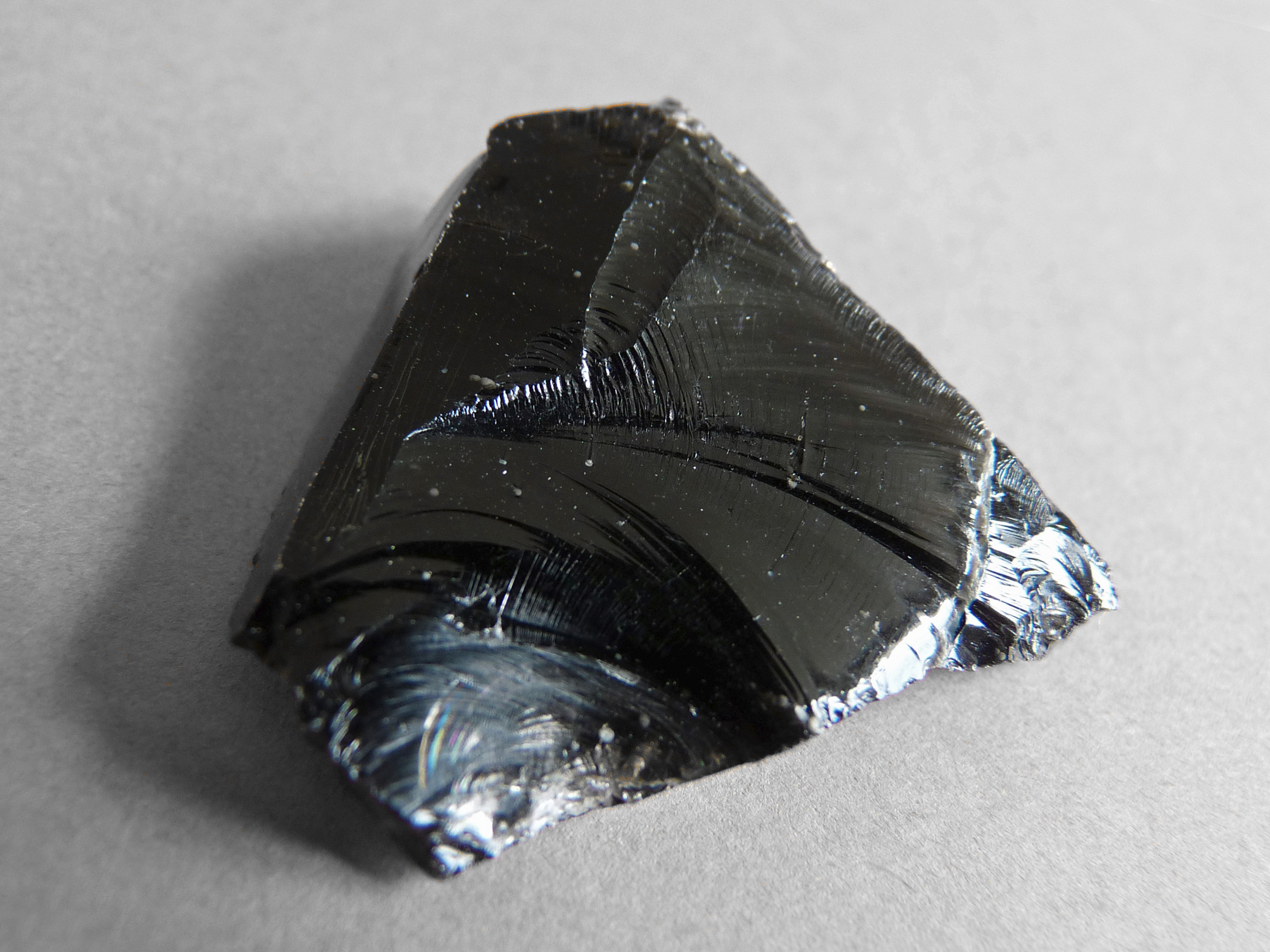
Conchoidal fractures in obsidian

A conchoidal fracture is a break or fracture of a brittle material that does not follow any natural planes of separation. Mindat.org defines conchoidal fracture as follows: "a fracture with smooth, curved surfaces, typically slightly concave, showing concentric undulations resembling the lines of growth of a shell". Materials that break in this way include quartz, chert, flint, quartzite, jasper, and other fine-grained or amorphous materials with a composition of pure silica, such as obsidian and window glass, as well as a few metals, such as solid gallium.

Crystalline materials such as quartz also exhibit conchoidal fractures when they lack a cleavage plane and do not break along a plane parallel to their crystalline faces. Hence, a conchoidal or uneven fracture is not a specific indication of the amorphous character of a mineral, or a material. Amorphous, cryptocrystalline, and crystalline materials can all present conchoidal fracture when they lack a preferential cleavage plane.

Conchoidal fractures can occur in various materials if they are properly percussed (struck). Cryptocrystalline silica, such as chert, or flint, with this material property were widely sought after, traded, and fashioned into sharp tools in the Stone Age.

Conchoidal fractures often result in a curved breakage surface that resembles the rippling, gradual curves of a mussel shell; the word "conchoid" is derived from the word for this animal (Ancient Greek: κογχοειδής konchoeidēs < κόγχη konchē). A swelling appears at the point of impact called the bulb of percussion. Shock waves emanating outwards from this point leave their mark on the stone as ripples. Other conchoidal features include small fissures emanating from the bulb of percussion.

They are defined in contrast to the faceted fractures often seen in single crystals such as semiconductor wafers and gemstones and to the high-energy ductile fracture surfaces desirable in most structural applications.

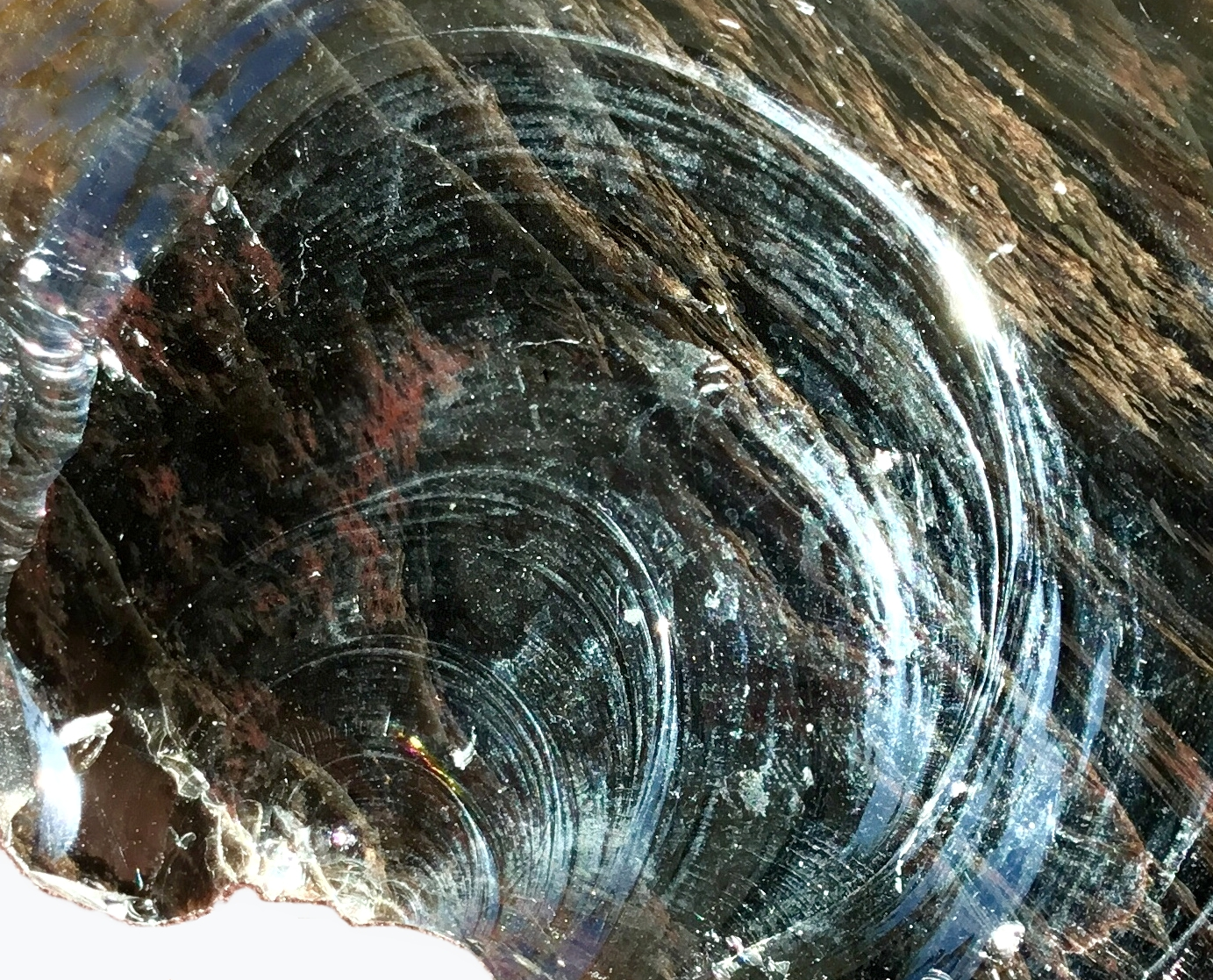
Conchoidal fracture in obsidian

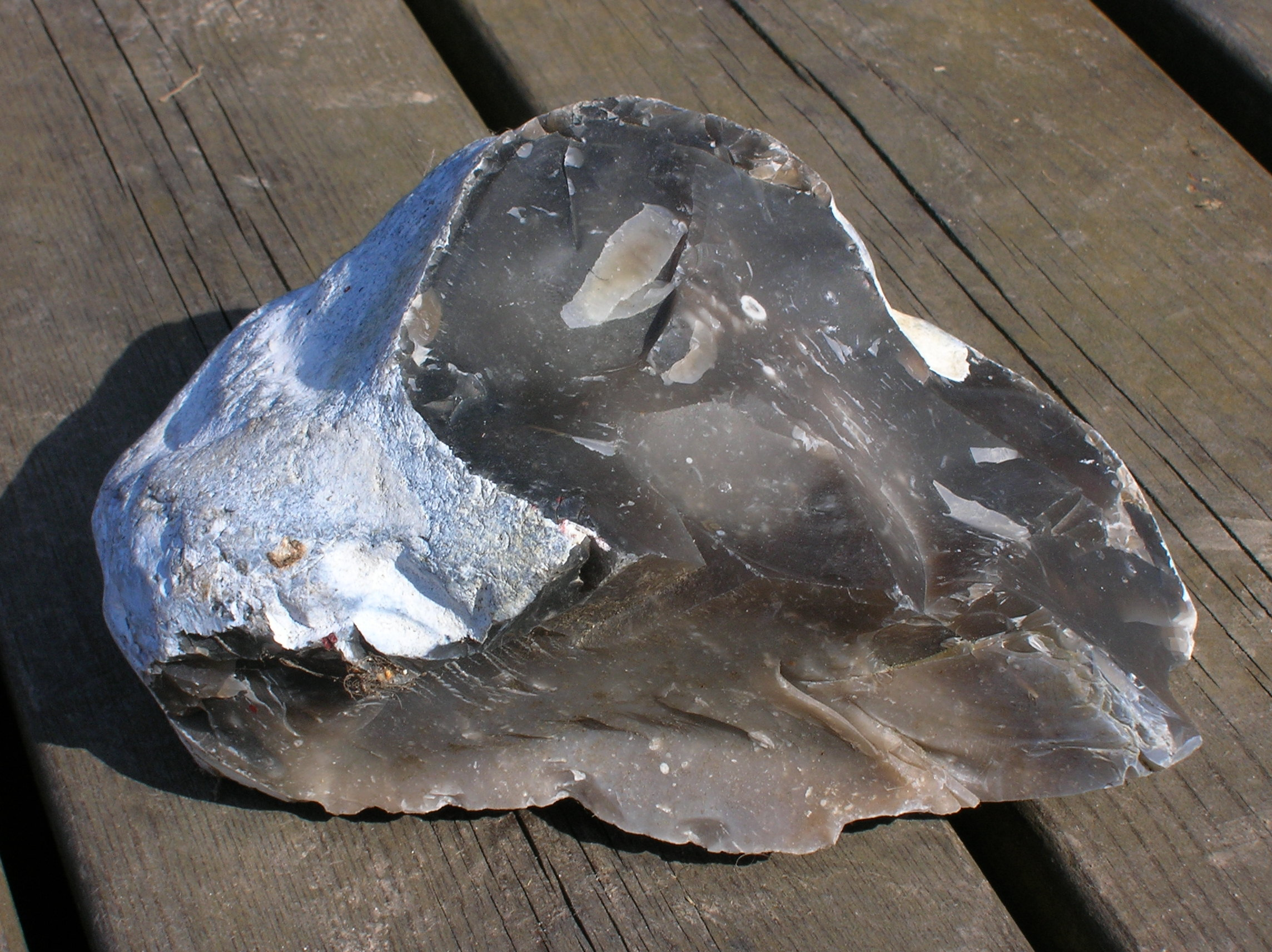
Conchoidal fracture in flint

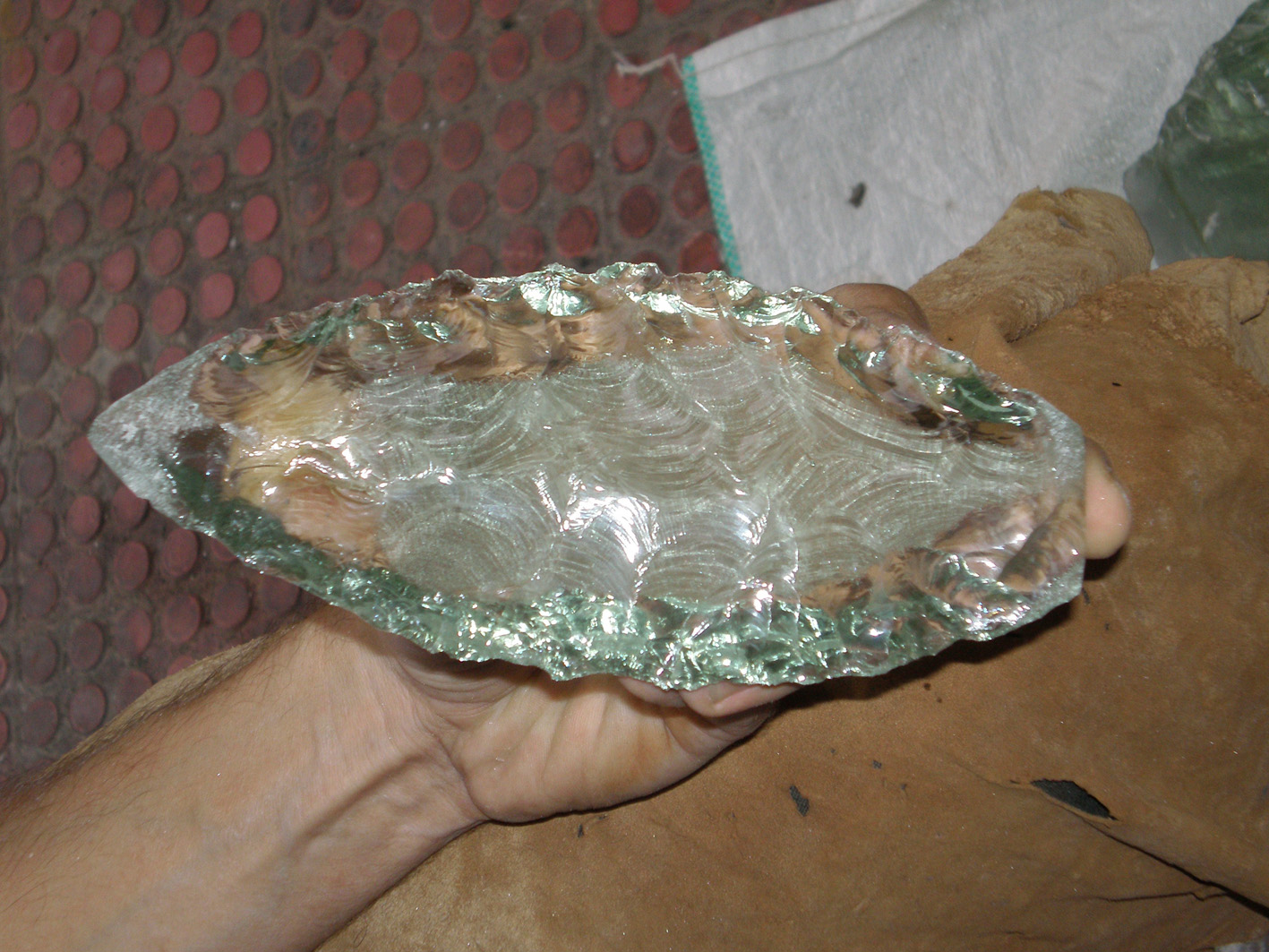
Multiple conchoidal fractures in knapped glass

== Subsets ==
Several subdefinitions exist, for instance on the Webmineral website:

- Brittle—conchoidal: very brittle fracture producing small, conchoidal fragments
- Brittle—subconchoidal: brittle fracture with subconchoidal fragments
- Conchoidal—irregular: irregular fracture producing small, conchoidal fragments
- Conchoidal—uneven: uneven fracture producing small, conchoidal fragments
- Subconchoidal: fractures developed in brittle materials characterized by semi-curving surfaces

== Lithics ==
In lithic stone tools, conchoidal fractures form the basis of flint knapping, since the shape of the broken surface is controlled only by the stresses applied, and not by some preferred orientation of the material. This property also makes such fractures useful in engineering, since they provide a permanent record of the stress state at the time of failure. As conchoidal fractures can be produced only by mechanical impact, rather than frost cracking for example, they can be a useful method of differentiating prehistoric stone tools from natural stones.

== See also ==
- Fracture (mineralogy)
