= Cerrillos Turquoise Mines =

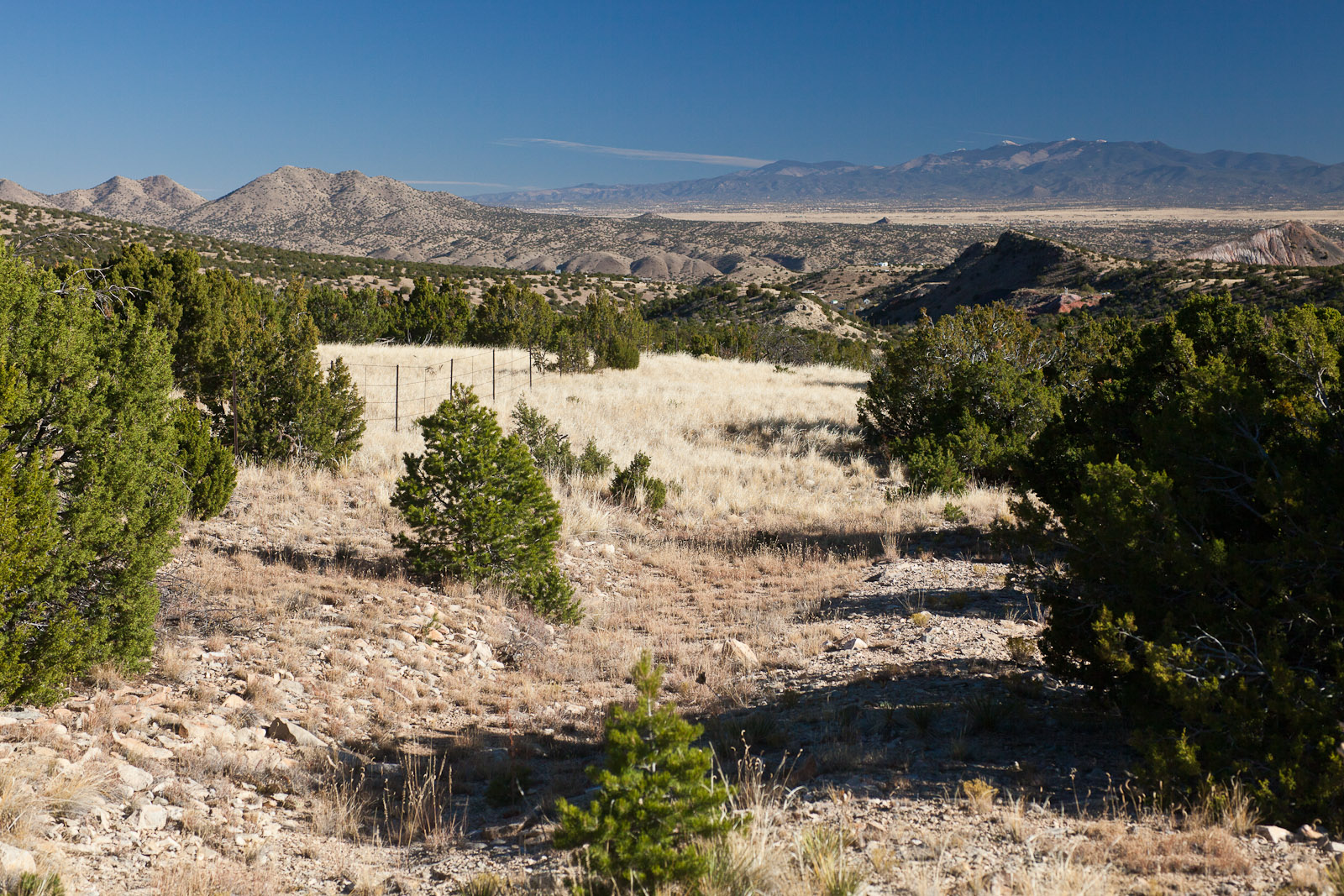
The Cerrillos Hills (foreground), with the Sangre de Cristo Mountains (background)

The Cerrillos Turquoise Mines (Tewa: K’uñą̈ˀiweh, Eastern Keres: Shó’wame K’ochu) are Ancestral and historical Puebloan turquoise mines located in the Cerrillos Hills (Note: Tewa: K’uñą̈ P’in transl. Turquoise Mountains; Eastern Keres: Shó’wame K’othẹ transl. Turquoise Mountains) 20 miles (32 km) southwest of Santa Fe, New Mexico.

Archeologists believe that most of the turquoise found at Chaco Canyon was mined in the Cerrillos Hills. In 1977, neutron activation analysis linked an artifact from Chetro Ketl to the Cerrillos mines.

Many modern Pueblo people claim to have ancient rights to these mines, with both Tewa (particularly Tano) and Keres people having historical links to the sites. Tano from Santo Domingo regarded themselves as owners of the site and frequently visited to mine turquoise, prior to being excluded by commercial exploitation.
