= Cerrillos Hills State Park =

State park in New Mexico, United States

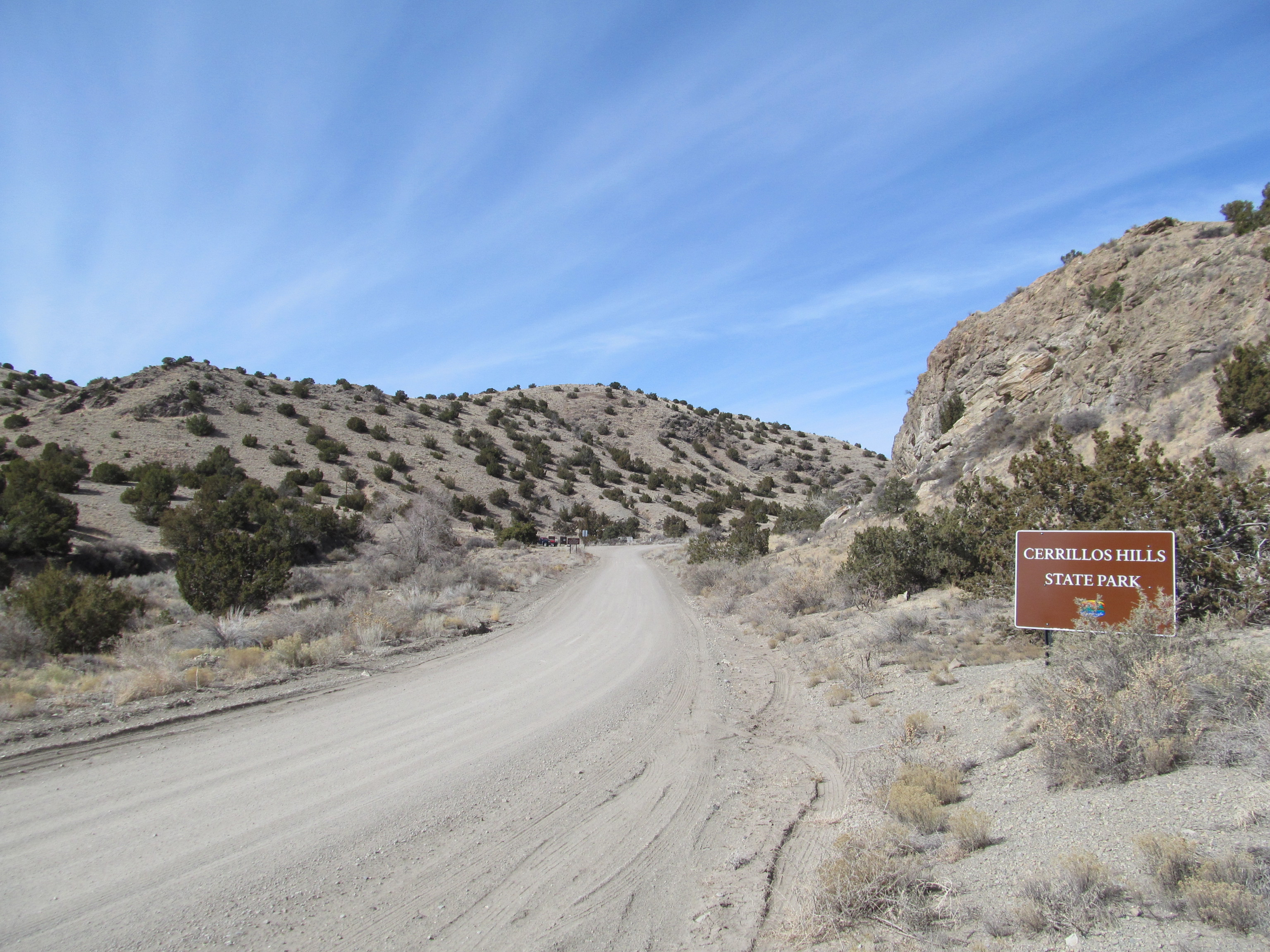

- Location within New Mexico
- Location: Santa Fe County, New Mexico, United States
- Coordinates: 35°26′40″N 106°07′20″W
- Area: 1,116 acres (452 ha)
- Elevation: 5,900–6,100 ft (1,800–1,900 m)
- Established: 2009
- Administrator: New Mexico Energy, Minerals and Natural Resources Department
- Website: Official website

Cerrillos Hills State Park is a state park of New Mexico, located 16 miles (26 km) south of Santa Fe. Transferred to state ownership in 2009, it is New Mexico's newest state park. The hills in the park range in elevation from 6,000 feet (1,800 m) to 6,900 feet (2,100 m) above sea level. The visitors' center is located in the village of Los Cerrillos. The park has numerous hiking trails.

== History ==
The Cerrillos Hills were originally known by the Tewa and Keres as the Turquoise Mountains (Note: Tewa: Kʼųųyą̈ą̈ Pʼin; Eastern Keres: Shóʼwame Kʼothẹ) due to the presence of turquoise mines, and by the Spanish as the Sierra de San Mateo. In 1581, they identified the lead-silver deposits there, which had earlier been used by the pueblo peoples as an ingredient in pottery glazes. After the coming of the "Americans" the Cerrillos Mining District was created in 1879. The Cerrillos Mining District was added to the New Mexico State Register of Cultural Properties in 1973.

The park was originally created in 2003 by Santa Fe County with the assistance of the Cerrillos Hills Park Coalition. Its name then was the Santa Fe County Cerrillos Hills Historic Park.

== Gallery ==
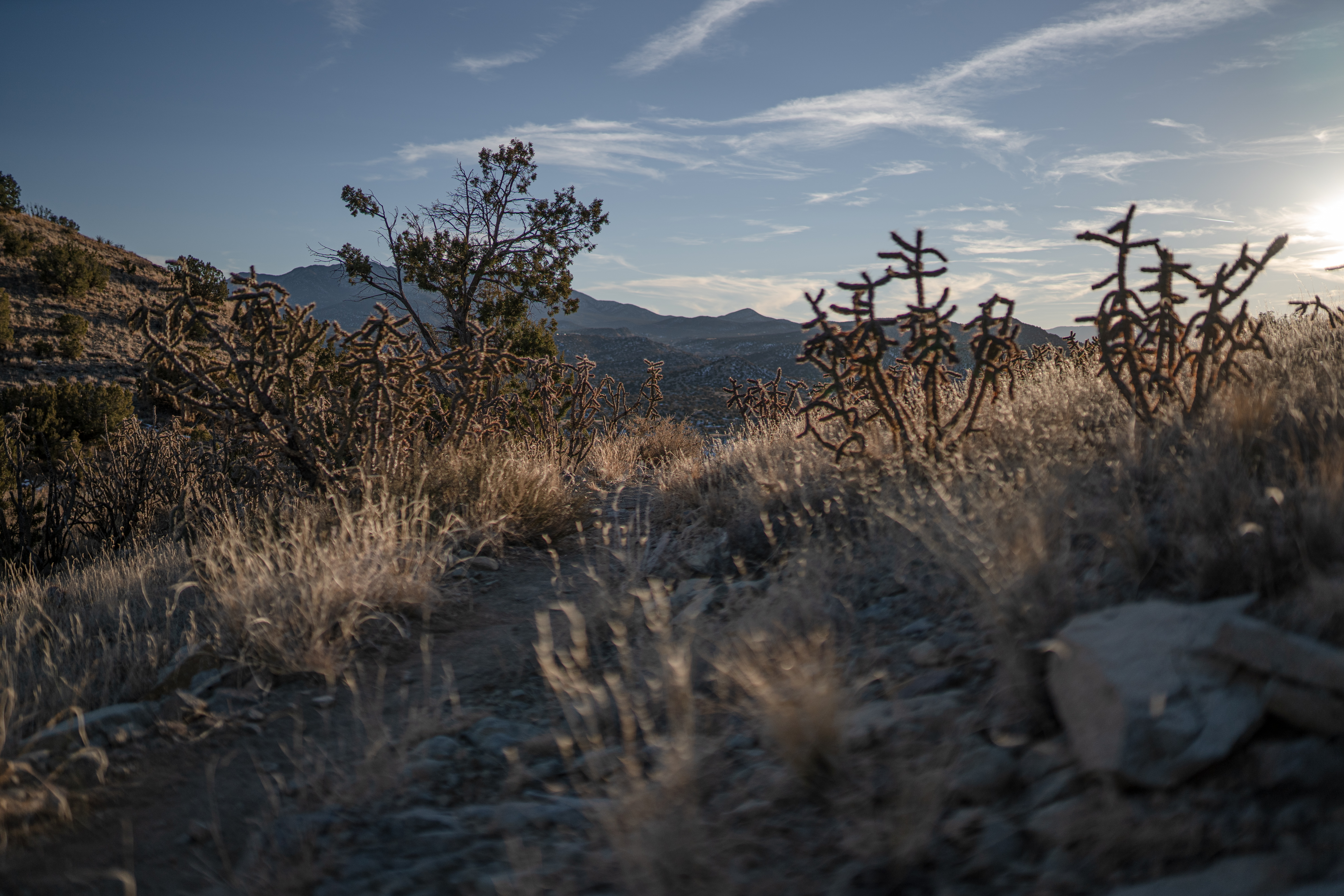
Looking south from Cerrillos Hills State Park towards the Ortiz Mountains

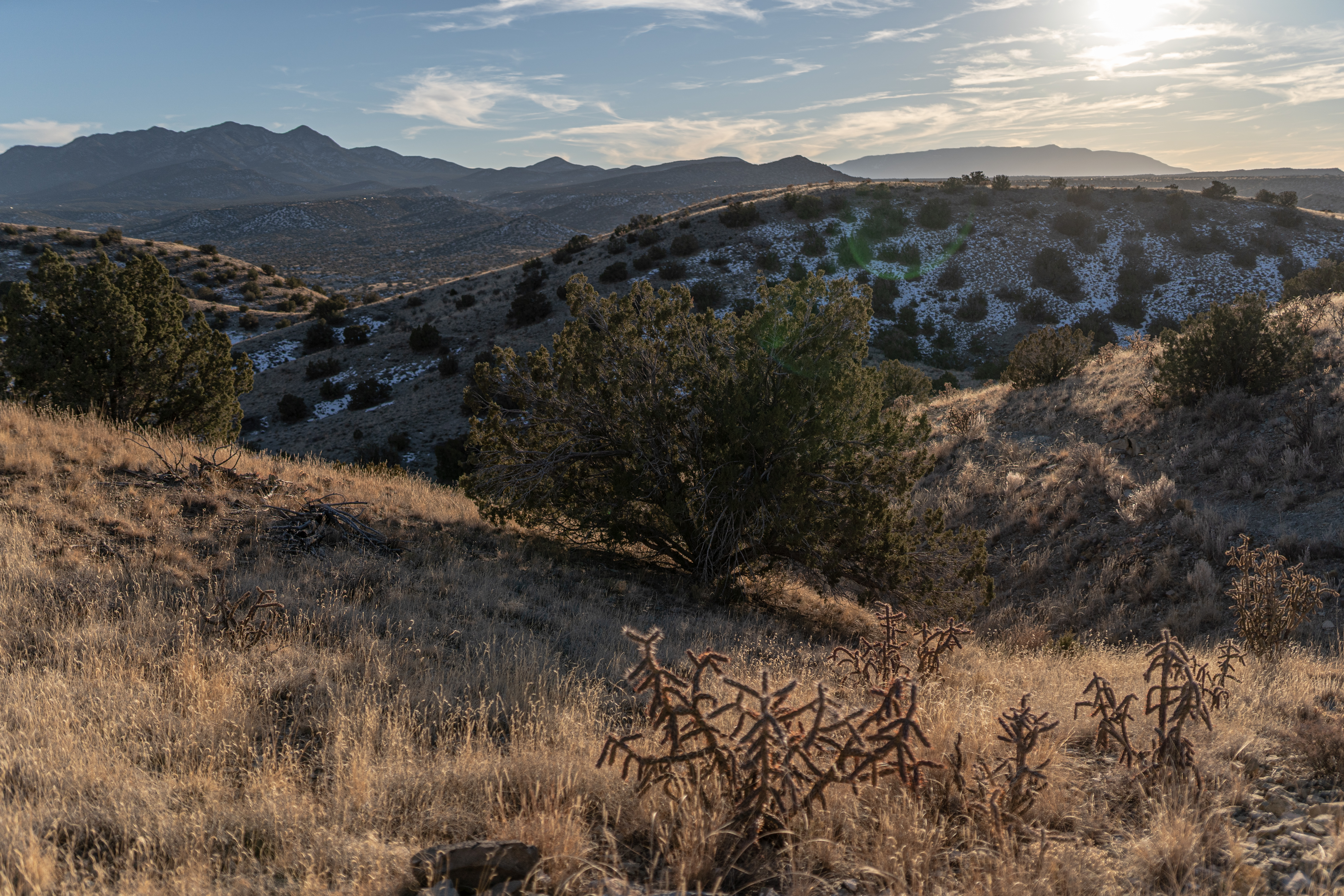
Cerrillos Hills State Park in Winter
