= Geography of New Mexico =

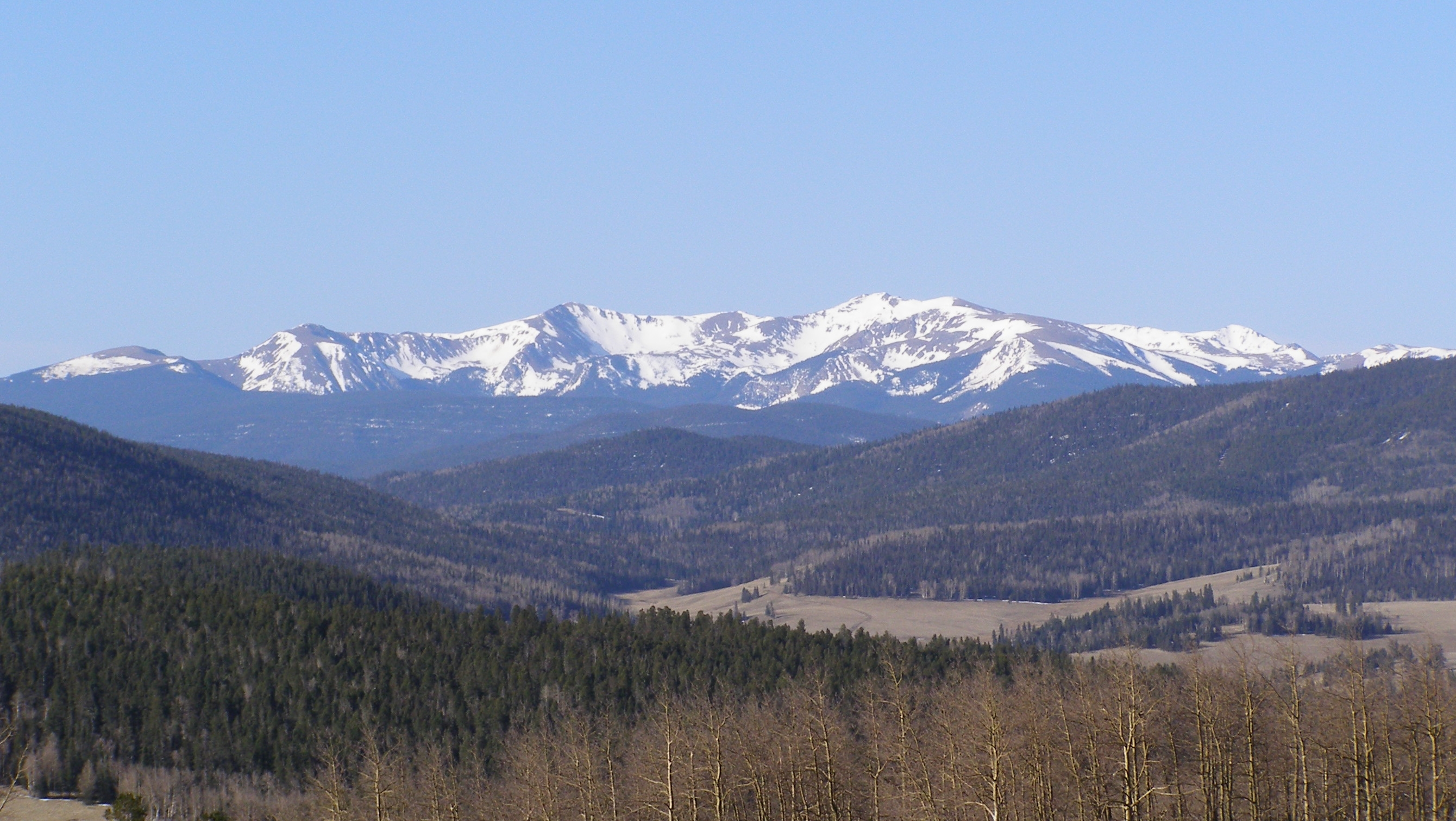
Wheeler Peak in the Sangre de Cristo Range

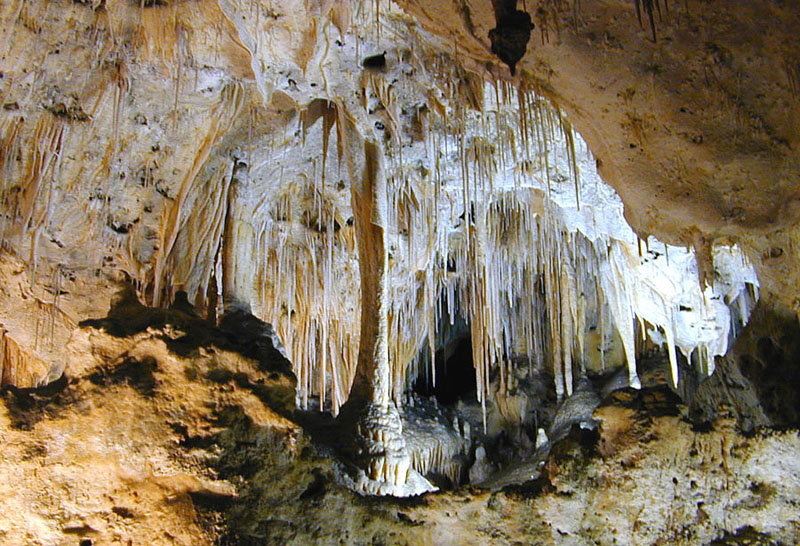
Carlsbad Caverns National Park

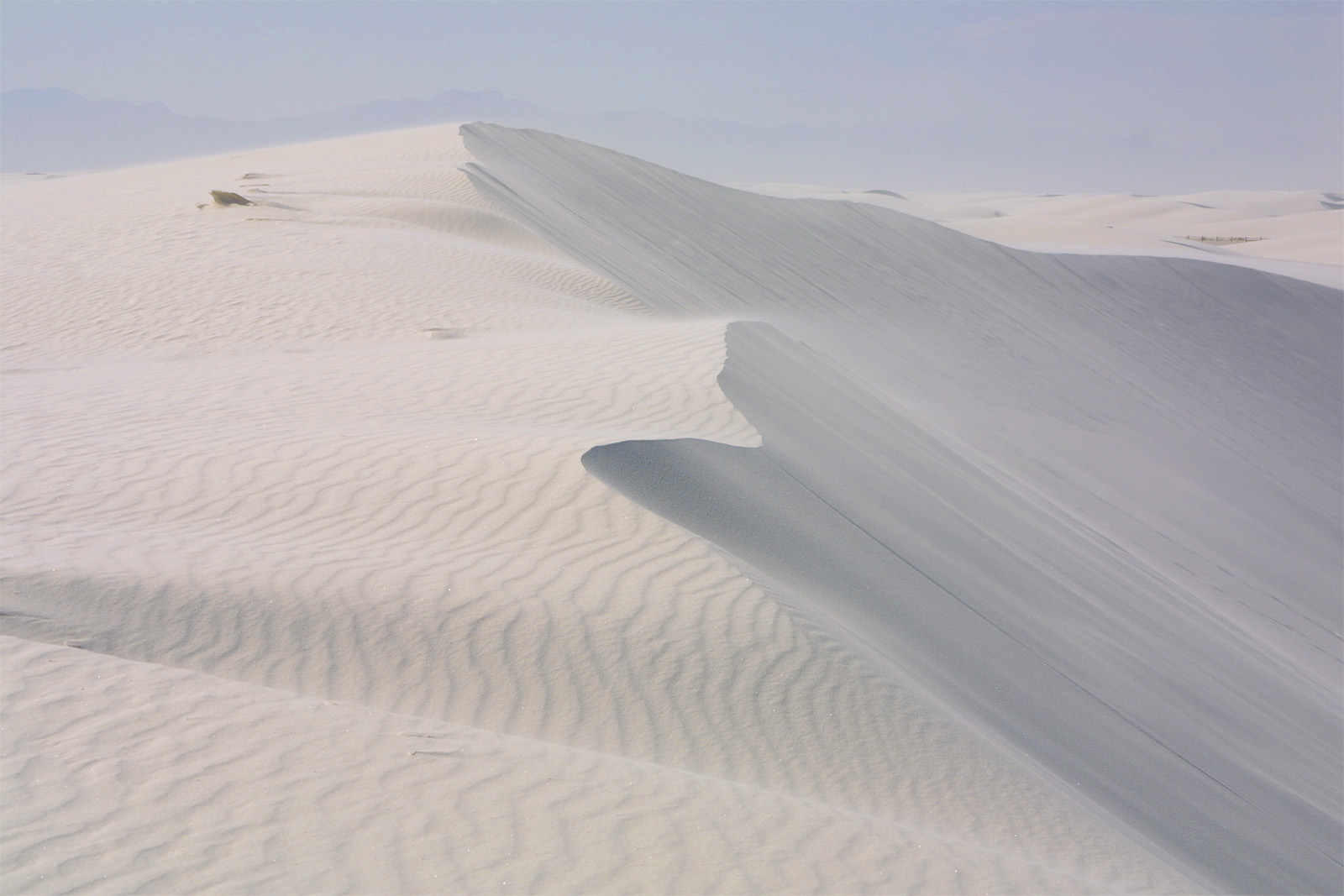
White Sands National Park

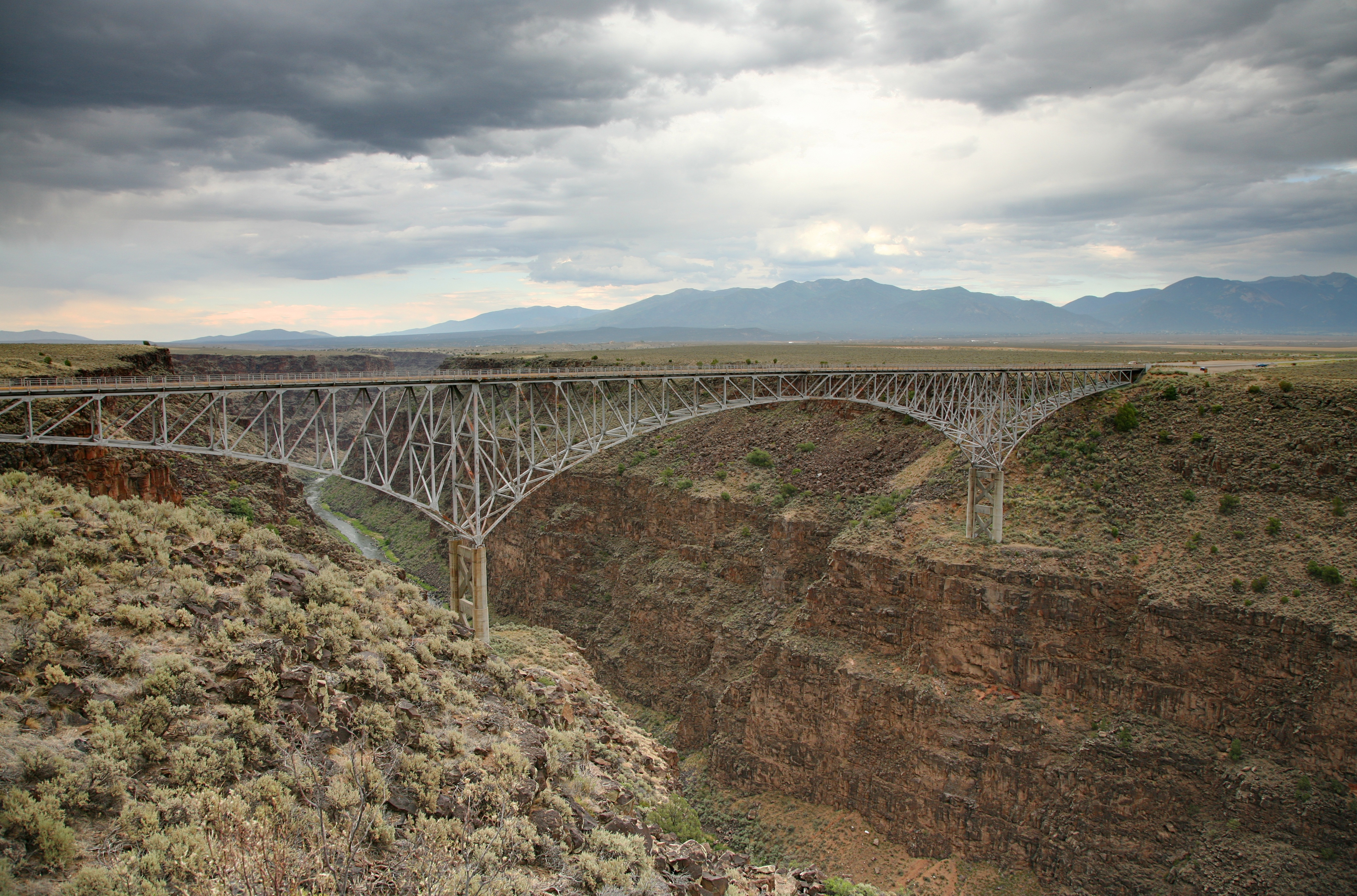
Rio Grande Gorge and Bridge

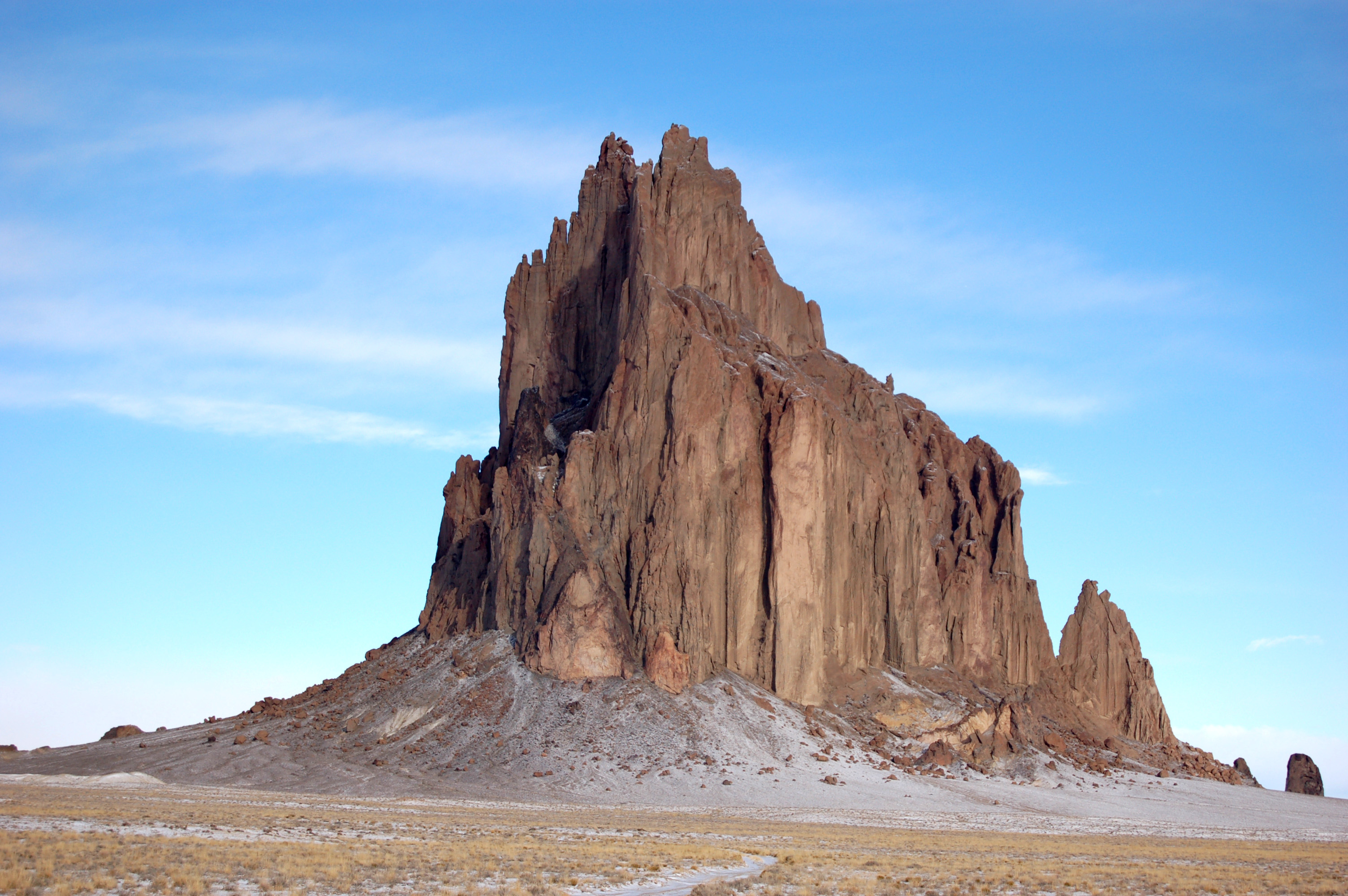
Shiprock

With a total area of 121,590 square miles (314,900 km^{2}), New Mexico is the fifth-largest state, after Alaska, Texas, California, and Montana. Its eastern border lies along 103°W longitude with the state of Oklahoma, and 2.2 miles (3.5 kilometres) west of 103°W longitude with Texas (due to a 19th-century surveying error). On the southern border, Texas makes up the eastern two-thirds, while the Mexican states of Chihuahua and Sonora make up the western third, with Chihuahua making up about 90% of that. The western border with Arizona runs along the 109° 03'W longitude. The southwestern corner of the state is known as the Bootheel. The 37°N parallel forms the northern boundary with Colorado. The states of New Mexico, Colorado, Arizona, and Utah come together at the Four Corners in New Mexico's northwestern corner. Its surface water area is about 292 square miles (760 km^{2}).

Despite its popular depiction as mostly arid desert, New Mexico has one of the most diverse landscapes of any U.S. state, ranging from wide, auburn-colored deserts and verdant grasslands, to broken mesas and high, snow-capped peaks. Close to a third of the state is covered in timberland, with heavily forested mountain wildernesses dominating the north. The Sangre de Cristo Mountains, the southernmost part of the Rocky Mountains, run roughly north–south along the east side of the Rio Grande, in the rugged, pastoral north. The Great Plains extend into the eastern third of the state, most notably the Llano Estacado ("Staked Plain"), whose westernmost boundary is marked by the Mescalero Ridge escarpment. The northwestern quadrant of New Mexico is dominated by the Colorado Plateau, characterized by unique volcanic formations, dry grasslands and shrublands, open pinyon-juniper woodland, and mountain forests. The Chihuahuan Desert, which is the largest in North America, extends through the south.

Over four–fifths of New Mexico is higher than 4,000 feet (1,200 meters) above sea level. The average elevation ranges from up to 8,000 feet (2,400 meters) above sea level in the northwest, to less than 4,000 feet in the southeast. The highest point is Wheeler Peak at over 13,160 feet (4,010 meters) in the Sangre de Cristo Mountains, while the lowest is the Red Bluff Reservoir at around 2,840 feet (870 meters), in the southeastern corner of the state.

In addition to the Rio Grande, which is tied for the fourth-longest river in the U.S., New Mexico has four other major river systems: the Pecos, Canadian, San Juan, and Gila. Nearly bisecting New Mexico from north to south, the Rio Grande has played an influential role in the region's history; its fertile floodplain has supported human habitation since prehistoric times, and European settlers initially lived exclusively in its valleys and along its tributaries. The Pecos, which flows roughly parallel to the Rio Grande at its east, was a popular route for explorers, as was the Canadian River, which rises in the mountainous north and flows east across the arid plains. The San Juan and Gila lie west of the Continental Divide, in the northwest and southwest, respectively. With the exception of the Gila, all major rivers are dammed in New Mexico and provide a major water source for irrigation and flood control.

Aside from its rivers, New Mexico has few sizeable natural bodies of water; there are several artificial lakes and reservoirs, the largest being Elephant Butte Reservoir, which was created by the damming of the Rio Grande. At its height in the early 20th century, the reservoir was the largest man-made lake in the world.

== Climate ==
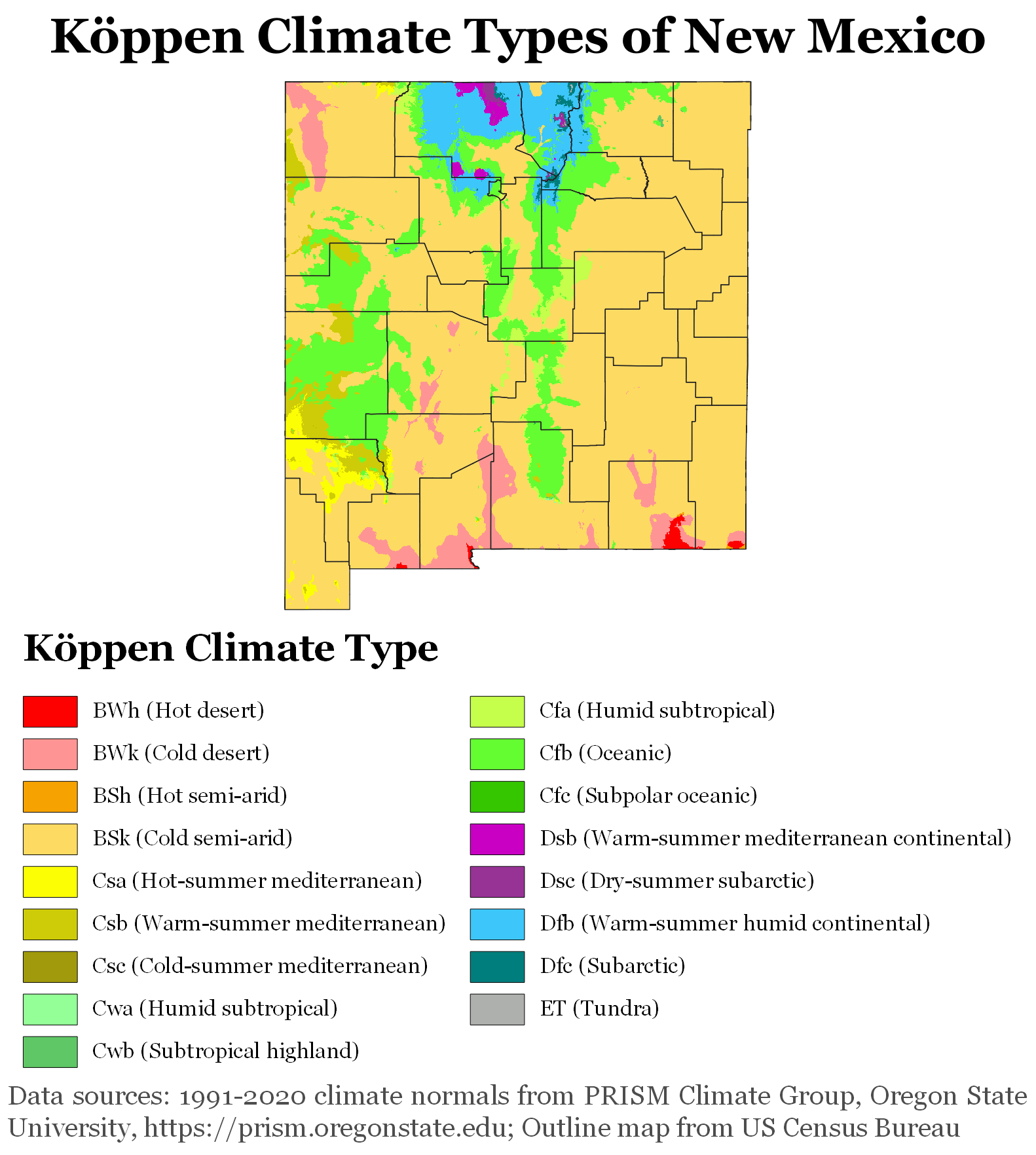
Köppen climate types of New Mexico, using 1991-2020 climate normals

New Mexico has long been known for its dry, temperate climate. Overall the state is semi-arid to arid, with areas of continental and alpine climates at higher elevations. New Mexico's statewide average precipitation is 13.7 inches (350 mm) a year, with average monthly amounts peaking in the summer, particularly in the more rugged north-central area around Albuquerque and in the south. Generally, the eastern third of the state receives the most rainfall, while the western third receives the least. Higher altitudes receive around 40 inches (1,000 mm), while the lowest elevations see as little as 8 to 10 inches (200 to 250 millimetres).

Annual temperatures can range from 65 °F (18 °C) in the southeast to below 40 °F (4 °C) in the northern mountains, with the average being the 53 °F (12 °C). During the summer, daytime temperatures can often exceed 100 °F (38 °C) at elevations below 5,000 feet (1,500 m); the average high temperature in July ranges from 99 °F (37 °C) at the lower elevations down to 78 °F (26 °C) at the higher elevations. In the colder months of November to March, many cities in New Mexico can have nighttime temperature lows in the teens above zero, or lower. The highest temperature recorded in New Mexico was 122 °F (50 °C) at the Waste Isolation Pilot Plant (WIPP) near Loving on June 27, 1994; the lowest recorded temperature is −50 °F (−46 °C) at Gavilan (near Lindrith) on February 1, 1951.

New Mexico's stable climate and sparse population provides for clearer skies and less light pollution, making it a popular site for several major astronomical observatories, including the Apache Point Observatory, the Very Large Array, and the Magdalena Ridge Observatory, among others.

=== Climate data ===
Climate data for New Mexico (general)
Month	Jan	Feb	Mar	Apr	May	Jun	Jul	Aug	Sep	Oct	Nov	Dec	Year
Mean daily maximum °F (°C)	49.7 (9.8)	54.0 (12.2)	61.8 (16.6)	69.2 (20.7)	78.1 (25.6)	87.8 (31.0)	88.8 (31.6)	86.3 (30.2)	80.4 (26.9)	70.6 (21.4)	58.6 (14.8)	49.4 (9.7)	69.6 (20.9)
Mean daily minimum °F (°C)	21.7 (−5.7)	25.0 (−3.9)	30.4 (−0.9)	36.5 (2.5)	45.2 (7.3)	54.4 (12.4)	59.5 (15.3)	58.1 (14.5)	51.1 (10.6)	39.7 (4.3)	29.0 (−1.7)	22.0 (−5.6)	39.4 (4.1)
Average precipitation inches (mm)	0.67 (17)	0.59 (15)	0.69 (18)	0.62 (16)	0.91 (23)	1.02 (26)	2.44 (62)	2.33 (59)	1.76 (45)	1.17 (30)	0.68 (17)	0.81 (21)	13.69 (349)
Source 1: https://www.extremeweatherwatch.com/states/new-mexico
Source 2: https://www.ncei.noaa.gov/cag/statewide/time-series/29/pcp/1/12/2020-2022?base_prd=true&begbaseyear=1991&endbaseyear=2020

Climate data for Albuquerque (Köppen BSk) (Note: 1991–2020 normals, extremes 1891–present. Official records for Albuquerque kept December 1891 to January 22, 1933 at the Weather Bureau Office and at Albuquerque Int'l since January 23, 1933. For more information, see Threadex)
Month	Jan	Feb	Mar	Apr	May	Jun	Jul	Aug	Sep	Oct	Nov	Dec	Year
Record high °F (°C)	72 (22)	79 (26)	85 (29)	89 (32)	98 (37)	107 (42)	105 (41)	101 (38)	100 (38)	91 (33)	83 (28)	72 (22)	107 (42)
Mean maximum °F (°C)	60.9 (16.1)	67.5 (19.7)	76.8 (24.9)	83.2 (28.4)	91.2 (32.9)	99.3 (37.4)	99.4 (37.4)	96.1 (35.6)	91.7 (33.2)	83.6 (28.7)	71.1 (21.7)	60.8 (16.0)	100.8 (38.2)
Mean daily maximum °F (°C)	48.4 (9.1)	54.1 (12.3)	62.8 (17.1)	70.3 (21.3)	79.9 (26.6)	90.4 (32.4)	91.2 (32.9)	88.8 (31.6)	82.5 (28.1)	70.6 (21.4)	57.3 (14.1)	47.3 (8.5)	70.3 (21.3)
Daily mean °F (°C)	37.4 (3.0)	41.9 (5.5)	49.5 (9.7)	56.8 (13.8)	66.1 (18.9)	76.1 (24.5)	78.9 (26.1)	76.9 (24.9)	70.3 (21.3)	58.4 (14.7)	45.7 (7.6)	36.9 (2.7)	57.9 (14.4)
Mean daily minimum °F (°C)	26.4 (−3.1)	29.8 (−1.2)	36.2 (2.3)	43.2 (6.2)	52.4 (11.3)	61.9 (16.6)	66.5 (19.2)	64.9 (18.3)	58.1 (14.5)	46.1 (7.8)	34.1 (1.2)	26.6 (−3.0)	45.5 (7.5)
Mean minimum °F (°C)	15.4 (−9.2)	17.6 (−8.0)	23.9 (−4.5)	30.5 (−0.8)	39.6 (4.2)	52.3 (11.3)	60.6 (15.9)	59.0 (15.0)	47.4 (8.6)	31.9 (−0.1)	21.3 (−5.9)	13.7 (−10.2)	10.9 (−11.7)
Record low °F (°C)	−17 (−27)	−10 (−23)	6 (−14)	13 (−11)	25 (−4)	35 (2)	42 (6)	46 (8)	26 (−3)	19 (−7)	−7 (−22)	−16 (−27)	−17 (−27)
Average precipitation inches (mm)	0.36 (9.1)	0.43 (11)	0.46 (12)	0.51 (13)	0.44 (11)	0.57 (14)	1.64 (42)	1.31 (33)	1.15 (29)	0.87 (22)	0.57 (14)	0.53 (13)	8.84 (225)
Average snowfall inches (cm)	1.4 (3.6)	1.5 (3.8)	0.7 (1.8)	0.3 (0.76)	0.0 (0.0)	0.0 (0.0)	0.0 (0.0)	0.0 (0.0)	0.0 (0.0)	0.3 (0.76)	0.9 (2.3)	2.8 (7.1)	7.9 (20)
Average precipitation days (≥ 0.01 in)	3.6	3.7	3.8	2.8	3.7	3.5	8.7	8.3	5.9	4.7	3.4	4.0	56.1
Average snowy days (≥ 0.1 in)	1.9	1.6	1.0	0.3	0.0	0.0	0.0	0.0	0.0	0.3	0.9	2.5	8.5
Average relative humidity (%)	56.3	49.8	39.7	32.5	31.1	29.8	41.9	47.1	47.4	45.3	49.9	56.8	44.0
Average dew point °F (°C)	18.0 (−7.8)	19.6 (−6.9)	19.2 (−7.1)	21.4 (−5.9)	27.9 (−2.3)	35.4 (1.9)	49.1 (9.5)	50.4 (10.2)	44.1 (6.7)	32.5 (0.3)	23.7 (−4.6)	19.0 (−7.2)	30.0 (−1.1)
Mean monthly sunshine hours	234.2	225.3	270.2	304.6	347.4	359.3	335.0	314.2	286.7	281.4	233.8	223.3	3,415.4
Percentage possible sunshine	75	74	73	78	80	83	76	75	77	80	75	73	77
Source: NOAA (relative humidity and sun 1961–1990)

Climate data for Santa Fe (Köppen BSK/Dfb/Cfb) (Note: 1991–2020 normals, extremes 1972–present, elevation 7,198 ft (2,194 m))
Month	Jan	Feb	Mar	Apr	May	Jun	Jul	Aug	Sep	Oct	Nov	Dec	Year
Record high °F (°C)	65 (18)	73 (23)	77 (25)	84 (29)	96 (36)	99 (37)	99 (37)	96 (36)	94 (34)	87 (31)	75 (24)	65 (18)	99 (37)
Mean maximum °F (°C)	56.3 (13.5)	61.5 (16.4)	70.9 (21.6)	77.7 (25.4)	86.1 (30.1)	94.6 (34.8)	94.8 (34.9)	91.7 (33.2)	87.4 (30.8)	79.7 (26.5)	67.3 (19.6)	56.3 (13.5)	96.1 (35.6)
Mean daily maximum °F (°C)	43.0 (6.1)	48.0 (8.9)	56.6 (13.7)	64.3 (17.9)	73.7 (23.2)	84.1 (28.9)	85.8 (29.9)	83.4 (28.6)	77.5 (25.3)	66.3 (19.1)	53.0 (11.7)	42.6 (5.9)	64.9 (18.3)
Daily mean °F (°C)	30.4 (−0.9)	34.7 (1.5)	41.5 (5.3)	48.3 (9.1)	57.3 (14.1)	67.1 (19.5)	70.5 (21.4)	68.6 (20.3)	62.1 (16.7)	50.8 (10.4)	38.7 (3.7)	30.1 (−1.1)	50.0 (10.0)
Mean daily minimum °F (°C)	17.9 (−7.8)	21.3 (−5.9)	26.4 (−3.1)	32.4 (0.2)	40.8 (4.9)	50.1 (10.1)	55.1 (12.8)	53.7 (12.1)	46.8 (8.2)	35.4 (1.9)	24.4 (−4.2)	17.6 (−8.0)	35.2 (1.8)
Mean minimum °F (°C)	1.9 (−16.7)	5.7 (−14.6)	10.7 (−11.8)	19.1 (−7.2)	26.9 (−2.8)	37.8 (3.2)	46.6 (8.1)	45.3 (7.4)	34.3 (1.3)	20.3 (−6.5)	8.3 (−13.2)	−0.1 (−17.8)	−4.1 (−20.1)
Record low °F (°C)	−14 (−26)	−24 (−31)	−6 (−21)	10 (−12)	19 (−7)	28 (−2)	37 (3)	36 (2)	26 (−3)	5 (−15)	−12 (−24)	−17 (−27)	−24 (−31)
Average precipitation inches (mm)	0.55 (14)	0.49 (12)	0.74 (19)	0.60 (15)	0.89 (23)	0.87 (22)	2.26 (57)	2.04 (52)	1.39 (35)	1.34 (34)	0.79 (20)	0.83 (21)	12.79 (325)
Average snowfall inches (cm)	3.7 (9.4)	2.4 (6.1)	3.9 (9.9)	0.4 (1.0)	0 (0)	0 (0)	0 (0)	0 (0)	0 (0)	1.3 (3.3)	1.7 (4.3)	6.8 (17)	20.2 (51)
Average precipitation days (≥ 0.01 in)	3.4	3.6	4.3	3.9	4.7	5.0	9.9	10.1	6.1	4.8	3.7	4.3	63.8
Average snowy days (≥ 0.1 in)	1.7	1.2	1.2	0.5	0.0	0.0	0.0	0.0	0.0	0.4	0.6	1.9	7.5
Source: NOAA

Climate data for Carlsbad (Köppen BSh/BSk) (Note: 1991–2020 normals. Mean monthly maxima and minima (i.e. the expected highest and lowest temperature readings at any point during the year or given month) calculated based on data at said location from 1991 to 2020. Extremes 1893–present)
Month	Jan	Feb	Mar	Apr	May	Jun	Jul	Aug	Sep	Oct	Nov	Dec	Year
Record high °F (°C)	88 (31)	92 (33)	98 (37)	101 (38)	110 (43)	114 (46)	113 (45)	111 (44)	106 (41)	101 (38)	97 (36)	88 (31)	114 (46)
Mean maximum °F (°C)	77 (25)	82 (28)	88 (31)	94 (34)	102 (39)	107 (42)	105 (41)	104 (40)	99 (37)	93 (34)	83 (28)	77 (25)	109 (43)
Mean daily maximum °F (°C)	59.2 (15.1)	64.3 (17.9)	72.3 (22.4)	80.8 (27.1)	89.2 (31.8)	97.5 (36.4)	96.6 (35.9)	95.2 (35.1)	87.9 (31.1)	78.8 (26.0)	67.2 (19.6)	58.5 (14.7)	79.0 (26.1)
Mean daily minimum °F (°C)	30.4 (−0.9)	34.0 (1.1)	40.7 (4.8)	48.3 (9.1)	57.9 (14.4)	67.0 (19.4)	70.7 (21.5)	69.4 (20.8)	62.3 (16.8)	50.2 (10.1)	38.2 (3.4)	30.7 (−0.7)	50.0 (10.0)
Mean minimum °F (°C)	17 (−8)	20 (−7)	25 (−4)	33 (1)	45 (7)	57 (14)	64 (18)	62 (17)	50 (10)	34 (1)	22 (−6)	16 (−9)	13 (−11)
Record low °F (°C)	−16 (−27)	−13 (−25)	8 (−13)	23 (−5)	31 (−1)	43 (6)	50 (10)	48 (9)	29 (−2)	21 (−6)	−1 (−18)	−4 (−20)	−16 (−27)
Average precipitation inches (mm)	0.65 (17)	0.58 (15)	0.68 (17)	0.70 (18)	1.57 (40)	1.28 (33)	1.80 (46)	1.62 (41)	1.72 (44)	1.21 (31)	0.72 (18)	0.57 (14)	11.86 (301)
Average snowfall inches (cm)	1.9 (4.8)	0.5 (1.3)	0 (0)	0 (0)	0 (0)	0 (0)	0 (0)	0 (0)	0 (0)	0.1 (0.25)	0.2 (0.51)	2.1 (5.3)	4.8 (12)
Average precipitation days (≥ 0.01 in)	4	3	3	2	4	5	6	6	6	5	3	4	49
Average snowy days (≥ 0.1 in)	1.9	0.4	0	0	0	0	0	0	0	0.1	0.1	2.1	4.6
Source: NOAA (relative humidity and dew point 1973–1990, sun 1962–1982)

Climate data for Las Cruces (Köppen BWk) (Note: 1991-2020, extremes 1892-)
Month	Jan	Feb	Mar	Apr	May	Jun	Jul	Aug	Sep	Oct	Nov	Dec	Year
Record high °F (°C)	78 (26)	86 (30)	90 (32)	96 (36)	104 (40)	110 (43)	109 (43)	105 (41)	103 (39)	95 (35)	87 (31)	78 (26)	110 (43)
Mean daily maximum °F (°C)	58.9 (14.9)	64.1 (17.8)	71.3 (21.8)	78.5 (25.8)	87.1 (30.6)	96.2 (35.7)	95.6 (35.3)	93.6 (34.2)	88.4 (31.3)	79.6 (26.4)	67.9 (19.9)	58.1 (14.5)	78.3 (25.7)
Mean daily minimum °F (°C)	29.6 (−1.3)	33.5 (0.8)	39.2 (4.0)	45.7 (7.6)	54.2 (12.3)	63.7 (17.6)	69.1 (20.6)	67.7 (19.8)	61.1 (16.2)	48.3 (9.1)	36.6 (2.6)	29.7 (−1.3)	48.2 (9.0)
Record low °F (°C)	−10 (−23)	−5 (−21)	8 (−13)	20 (−7)	27 (−3)	35 (2)	42 (6)	44 (7)	30 (−1)	20 (−7)	−4 (−20)	−1 (−18)	−10 (−23)
Average precipitation inches (mm)	0.48 (12)	0.36 (9.1)	0.26 (6.6)	0.22 (5.6)	0.38 (9.7)	0.65 (17)	1.77 (45)	1.73 (44)	1.41 (36)	0.82 (21)	0.42 (11)	0.64 (16)	9.14 (233)
Average snowfall inches (cm)	0.4 (1.0)	0.1 (0.25)	0 (0)	0 (0)	0 (0)	0 (0)	0 (0)	0 (0)	0 (0)	0.0 (0.0)	0.1 (0.25)	0.4 (1.0)	1.0 (2.5)
Average precipitation days (≥ 0.01 in)	3.3	2.5	2.0	1.6	2.1	3.2	8.9	8.4	5.2	4.0	2.6	3.3	47.1
Average snowy days (≥ 0.1 in)	0.3	0.1	0	0	0	0	0	0	0	0.0	0.1	0.3	0.8
Source 1: NOAA
Source 2: NCEI

== Flora and fauna ==
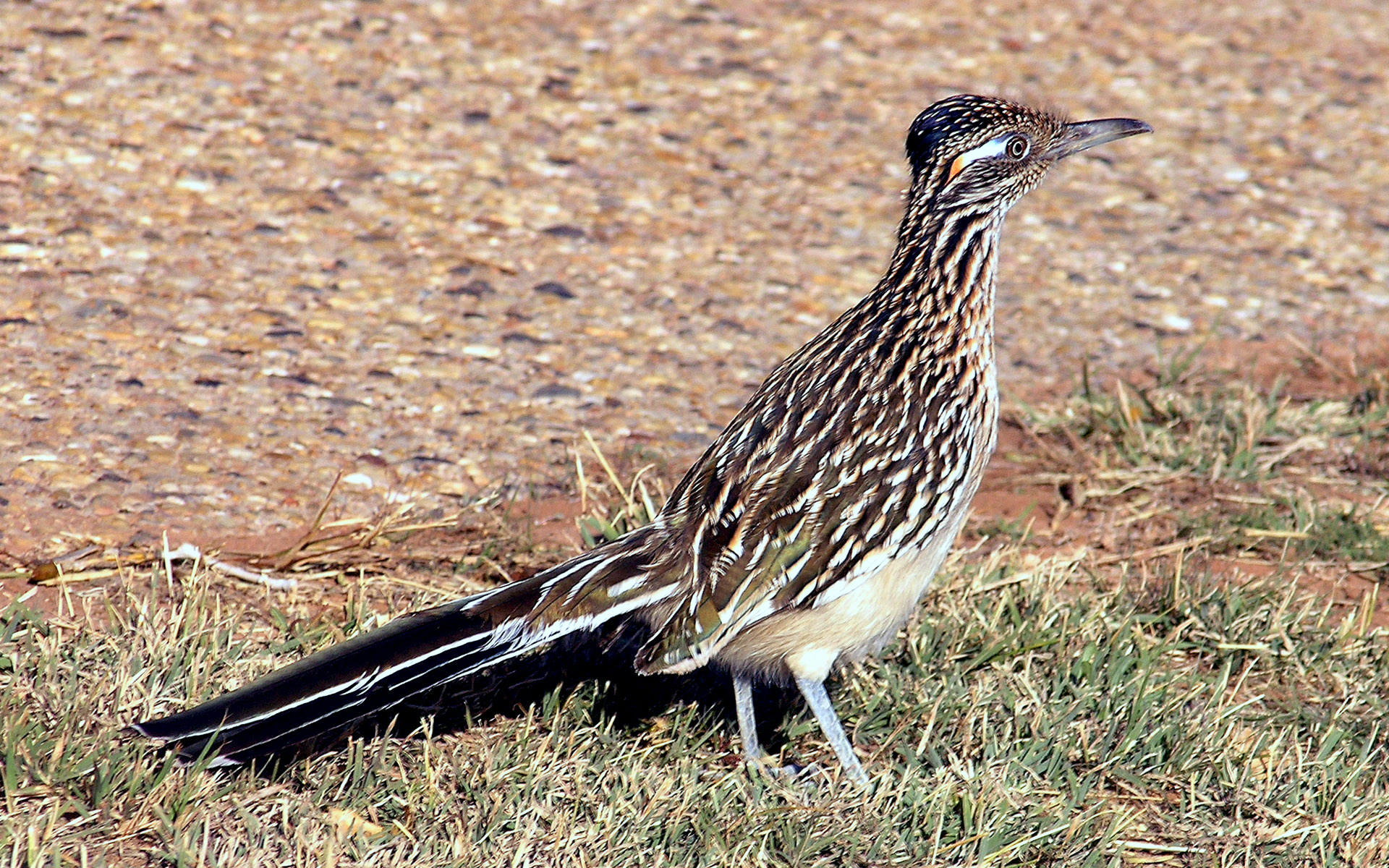
Greater roadrunner (the state bird of New Mexico)

Owing to its varied topography, New Mexico has six distinct vegetation zones that provide diverse sets of habitats for many plants and animals. The Upper Sonoran Zone is by far the most prominent, constituting about three-fourths of the state; it includes most of the plains, foothills, and valleys above 1,400 metres (4,500 feet), and is defined by prairie grasses, low piñon pines, and juniper shrubs. The Llano Estacado in the east features shortgrass prairie with blue grama, which sustain bison. The Chihuahuan Desert in the south is characterized by shrubby creosote. The Colorado Plateau in the northwest corner of New Mexico is high desert with cold winters, featuring sagebrush, shadescale, greasewood, and other plants adapted to the saline and seleniferous soil.

The mountainous north hosts a wide array of vegetation types corresponding to elevation gradients, such as piñon-juniper woodlands near the base, through evergreen conifers, spruce-fir and aspen forests in the transitionary zone, and Krummholz, and alpine tundra at the very top. The Apachian zone tucked into the southwestern bootheel of the state has high-calcium soil, oak woodlands, Arizona cypress, and other plants that are not found in other parts of the state. The southern sections of the Rio Grande and Pecos valleys have 20,000 square miles (52,000 square kilometres) of New Mexico's best grazing land and irrigated farmland.

New Mexico's varied climate and vegetation zones consequently support diverse wildlife. Black bears, bighorn sheep, bobcats, cougars, deer, and elk live in habitats above 2,100 metres (7,000 feet), while coyotes, jackrabbits, kangaroo rats, javelina, porcupines, pronghorn antelope, western diamondbacks, and wild turkeys live in less mountainous and elevated regions. The iconic roadrunner, which is the state bird, is abundant in the southeast. Endangered species include the Mexican gray wolf, which is being gradually reintroduced in the world, and Rio Grande silvery minnow. Over 500 species of birds live or migrate through New Mexico, third only to California and Mexico.

== Conservation ==
New Mexico and 12 other western states together account for 93% of all federally owned land in the U.S. Roughly one–third of the state, or 24.7 million of 77.8 million acres, is held by the U.S. government, the tenth-highest percentage in the country. More than half this land is under the Bureau of Land Management, while another third is managed by the U.S. Forest Service.

New Mexico was central to the early–20th century conservation movement, with Gila Wilderness being designated the world's first wilderness area in 1924. The state also hosts nine of the country's 84 national monuments, the most of any state after Arizona; these include the second oldest monument, El Morro, which was created in 1906, and the Gila Cliff Dwellings, proclaimed in 1907.

National Forests in New Mexico
Carson National Forest
Cibola National Forest
Lincoln National Forest
Santa Fe National Forest
Gila National Forest
Gila Wilderness
Coronado National Forest (in Hidalgo County)

Areas managed by the National Park Service include:

- Aztec Ruins National Monument at Aztec
- Bandelier National Monument in Los Alamos
- Capulin Volcano National Monument near Capulin
- Carlsbad Caverns National Park near Carlsbad
- Chaco Culture National Historical Park at Nageezi
- El Camino Real de Tierra Adentro National Historic Trail
- El Malpais National Monument in Grants
- El Morro National Monument in Ramah
- Fort Union National Monument at Watrous
- Gila Cliff Dwellings National Monument near Silver City
- Kasha-Katuwe Tent Rocks National Monument
- Old Spanish National Historic Trail
- Organ Mountains – Desert Peaks National Monument near Las Cruces
- Manhattan Project National Historical Park
- Pecos National Historical Park in Pecos
- Petroglyph National Monument near Albuquerque
- Salinas Pueblo Missions National Monument at Mountainair
- Santa Fe National Historic Trail
- White Sands National Park near Alamogordo
- Rio Grande del Norte National Monument near Taos
- Valles Caldera National Preserve in the Jemez Mountains

National Wildlife Refuges in New Mexico managed by the U.S. Fish and Wildlife Service include:

- Bitter Lake National Wildlife Refuge
- Bosque del Apache National Wildlife Refuge
- Grulla National Wildlife Refuge
- Las Vegas National Wildlife Refuge
- Maxwell National Wildlife Refuge
- San Andres National Wildlife Refuge
- Sevilleta National Wildlife Refuge
- Valle de Oro National Wildlife Refuge in the City of Albuquerque's South Valley

independent wildlife refuges in New Mexico include:

- Whitfield Wildlife Conservation Area in Valencia County · Whitfield Wildlife Conservation Area – Valencia Soil and Water Conservation District

Areas managed by the New Mexico State Parks Division: (Note: Vietnam Veterans Memorial was a state park until 2017, when it was transferred to the Department of Veteran Services in 2017. Vietnam Veterans Memorial State Park | Angel Fire, NM 87045 (newmexico.org))

- Bluewater Lake State Park
- Bottomless Lakes State Park
- Brantley Lake State Park
- Cerrillos Hills State Park
- Caballo Lake State Park
- Cimarron Canyon State Park
- City of Rocks State Park
- Clayton Lake State Park
- Conchas Lake State Park
- Coyote Creek State Park
- Eagle Nest Lake State Park
- Elephant Butte Lake State Park
- El Vado Lake State Park
- Heron Lake State Park
- Hyde Memorial State Park
- Leasburg Dam State Park
- Living Desert Zoo and Gardens State Park
- Manzano Mountains State Park
- Mesilla Valley Bosque State Park
- Morphy Lake State Park
- Navajo Lake (Rio Arriba, NM and San Juan, NM)
- Oasis State Park
- Oliver Lee Memorial State Park
- Pancho Villa State Park
- Percha Dam State Park
- Rio Grande Nature Center State Park
- Rio Grande Valley State Park
- Rockhound State Park
- Santa Rosa Lake State Park
- Storrie Lake State Park
- Sugarite Canyon State Park
- Sumner Lake State Park
- Fenton Lake State Park
- Ute Lake State Park
- Villanueva State Park

== Environmental issues ==
In January 2016, New Mexico sued the United States Environmental Protection Agency over negligence after the 2015 Gold King Mine waste water spill. The spill had caused heavy metals such as cadmium and lead and toxins such as arsenic to flow into the Animas River, polluting water basins of several states. The state has since implemented or considered stricter regulations and harsher penalties for spills associated with resource extraction.

New Mexico is a major producer of greenhouse gases. A study by Colorado State University showed that the state's oil and gas industry generated 60 million metric tons of greenhouse gases in 2018, over four times greater than previously estimated. The fossil fuels sector accounted for over half the state's overall emissions, which totaled 113.6 million metric tons, about 1.8% of the country's total and more than twice the national average per capita. The New Mexico government has responded with efforts to regulate industrial emissions, promote renewable energy, and incentivize the use of electric vehicles.

== Settlements ==
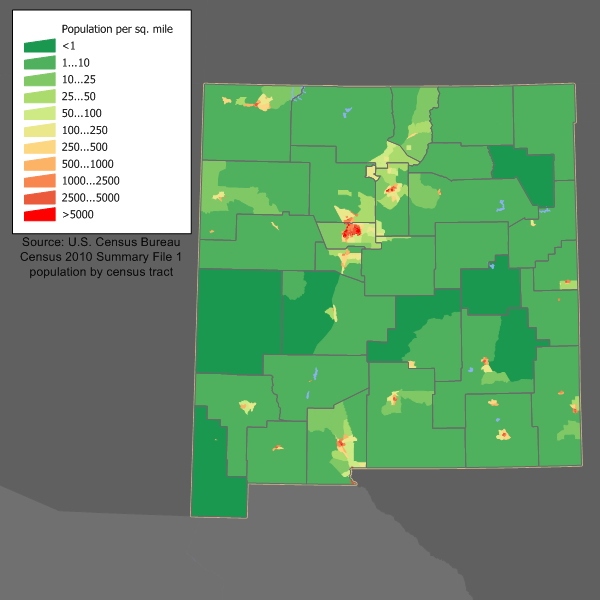
New Mexico population density map

With just 17 people per square mile (6.6 people/km^{2}), New Mexico is one of the least densely populated states, ranking 45th out of 50. By contrast, the overall population density of the U.S. is 90/mi^{2} (35/km^{2}). The state is divided into 33 counties and 106 municipalities, which include cities, towns, villages, and a consolidated city-county, Los Alamos. Only two cities have at least 100,000 residents: Albuquerque and Las Cruces, whose respective metropolitan areas together account for the majority of New Mexico's population.

Residents are concentrated in the north-central region of New Mexico, anchored by the state's largest city, Albuquerque. Centered in Bernalillo County, the Albuquerque metropolitan area includes New Mexico's third-largest city, Rio Rancho, and has a population of over 918,000, accounting for one-third of all New Mexicans. It is adjacent to Santa Fe, the capital and fourth-largest city. Altogether, the Albuquerque–Santa Fe–Las Vegas combined statistical area includes more than 1.17 million people, or nearly 60% of the state population.

New Mexico's other major center of population is in south-central area around Las Cruces, its second-largest city and the largest city in the southern region of the state. The Las Cruces metropolitan area includes roughly 214,000 residents, but with neighboring El Paso, Texas forms a combined statistical area numbering over 1 million.

New Mexico hosts 23 federally recognized tribal reservations, including part of the Navajo Nation, the largest and most populous tribe; of these, 11 hold off-reservation trust lands elsewhere in the state. The vast majority of federally recognized tribes are concentrated in the northwest, followed by the north-central region.

Like several other southwestern states, New Mexico hosts numerous colonias, a type of unincorporated, low-income slum characterized by abject poverty, the absence of basic services (such as water and sewage), and scarce housing and infrastructure. The University of New Mexico estimates there are 118 colonias in the state, though the U.S. Department of Housing and Urban Development identifies roughly 150. The majority are located along the Mexico-U.S. border.

Largest cities or towns in New Mexico Source: 2017 U.S. Census Bureau Estimate
Rank	Name	County	Pop.
1	Albuquerque	Bernalillo	558,545
2	Las Cruces	Doña Ana	101,712
3	Rio Rancho	Sandoval / Bernalillo	96,159
4	Santa Fe	Santa Fe	83,776
5	Roswell	Chaves	47,775
6	Farmington	San Juan	45,450
7	Clovis	Curry	38,962
8	Hobbs	Lea	37,764
9	Alamogordo	Otero	31,248
10	Carlsbad	Eddy	28,774

== See also ==
- Delaware Basin
- List of counties in New Mexico
