= List of New Mexico state parks =

Map of State Parks of New Mexico
Hold cursor over locations to display park name;
click to go to park article.

This is a list of state parks and reserves in the New Mexico state park system. The system began with the establishment of Bottomless Lakes State Park on November 18, 1933. New Mexico currently has 35 state parks. It has been calculated that 70% of the state's population lives within 40 miles (64 km) of a New Mexico state park. The system as a whole saw 4.5 million visitors in 2009. The parks are managed by the New Mexico State Parks Division of the New Mexico Energy, Minerals and Natural Resources Department. The mission of the State Parks Division is to "protect and enhance natural and cultural resources, provide first-class recreational and education facilities and opportunities, and promote public safety to benefit and enrich the lives of visitors."

Name	County	Size		Elevation		Estab- lished	Image	Remarks
Name	County	acres	ha	ft	m	Estab- lished	Image	Remarks
Bluewater Lake State Park	Cibola	3,000	1,200	7,400	2,300	1937		Encircles a 1,200-acre (490 ha) reservoir in the Zuni Mountains.
Bottomless Lakes State Park	Chaves	1,400	570	3,500	1,100	1933		Encompasses eight cenotes whose greenish-blue water disguises their true depth.
Brantley Lake State Park	Eddy	3,000	1,200	3,300	1,000	1989		Features New Mexico's southernmost lake, a 4,000-acre (1,600 ha) reservoir on the Pecos River.
Caballo Lake State Park	Sierra	5,384	2,179	4,100	1,200	1964		Surrounds Caballo Lake, a 11,500-acre (4,700 ha) reservoir on the Rio Grande.
Cerrillos Hills State Park	Santa Fe	1,116	452			2009		Provides day-use recreation amidst 1,100 years of mining history.
Cimarron Canyon State Park	Colfax	378	153	7,500	2,300	1979		Showcases the canyon of the Cimarron River and the Palisades Sill formation.
City of Rocks State Park	Grant	1,230	500	5,250	1,600	1953		Features rock formations eroded out of 35-million-year-old volcanic ash, and a public observatory.
Clayton Lake State Park	Union	471	191	5,040	1,540	1965		Features a 170-acre (69 ha) reservoir and an extensive fossil trackway of dinosaur footprints.
Conchas Lake State Park	San Miguel	359	145	4,200	1,300	1955		Adjoins a 16,400-acre (6,600 ha) reservoir on the Canadian River.
Coyote Creek State Park	Mora	462	187	7,700	2,300	1969		Boasts the most densely stocked trout stream in New Mexico.
Eagle Nest Lake State Park	Colfax	3,488	1,412	8,300	2,500	2004		Provides access to a 2,400-acre (970 ha) reservoir in a scenic mountain valley.
Elephant Butte Lake State Park	Sierra	24,500	9,900	4,500	1,400	1964		Surrounds Elephant Butte Reservoir, the state's largest and most popular reservoir.
El Vado Lake State Park	Rio Arriba	1,730	700	6,900	2,100	1961		Provides access to a 3,200-acre (1,300 ha) reservoir adjacent to Heron Lake State Park.
Fenton Lake State Park	Sandoval	700	280	7,900	2,400	1984		Encompasses a 37-acre (15 ha) reservoir surrounded by ponderosa pine forest.
Heron Lake State Park	Rio Arriba	4,100	1,700	7,200	2,200			Provides access to a 5,900-acre (2,400 ha) no-wake reservoir adjacent to El Vado Lake State Park.
Hyde Memorial State Park	Santa Fe	350	140	8,500	2,600	1938		Provides outdoor recreation amenities near Santa Fe.
Leasburg Dam State Park	Doña Ana	293	119	4,200	1,300	1971		Features a quiet stretch of the Rio Grande below a 1908 diversion dam.
Living Desert Zoo and Gardens State Park	Eddy	1,500	610	3,200	980	1967		Comprises a zoo and botanical garden of wildlife native to the Chihuahuan Desert in the city of Carlsbad.
Manzano Mountains State Park	Torrance	160	65	7,600	2,300	1973		Protects part of the forested foothills of the Manzano Mountains.
Mesilla Valley Bosque State Park	Doña Ana	305	123	3,900	1,200	2003		Interprets a bosque on the Rio Grande and adjacent Chihuahuan Desert.
Morphy Lake State Park	Mora	30	12	8,000	2,400	1965		Preserves a small, secluded lake in the Sangre de Cristo Mountains.
Navajo Lake State Park	Rio Arriba and San Juan	21,000	8,500	6,100	1,900	1995		Comprises three units on New Mexico's second-largest reservoir.
Oasis State Park	Roosevelt	193	78	4,100	1,200	1961		Features a fishing pond and sand dunes amidst the east-central plains.
Oliver Lee Memorial State Park	Otero	640	260	4,363	1,330	1980		Showcases a verdant canyon in the Sacramento Mountains and Oliver Lee's restored 1893 ranch house.
Pancho Villa State Park	Luna	60	24	4,060	1,240	1961		Interprets the 1916 Battle of Columbus (Pancho Villa's raid onto U.S. soil) and the retaliatory Pancho Villa Expedition.
Pecos Canyon State Park	San Miguel	378	153			2019		Comprises three non-contiguous parcels north of the Village of Pecos.
Percha Dam State Park	Sierra	80	32	4,100	1,200	1970		Provides outdoor recreation on an impounded section of the Rio Grande.
Rio Grande Nature Center State Park	Bernalillo	38	15	5,000	1,500	1982		Interprets a bosque on the Rio Grande in Albuquerque.
Rockhound State Park	Luna	1,100	450	4,500	1,400	1965		Allows mineral collecting for amateur geology in the Florida Mountains.
Santa Rosa Lake State Park	Guadalupe	550	220	4,800	1,500			Adjoins a 3,800-acre (1,500 ha) reservoir.
Storrie Lake State Park	San Miguel	80	32	6,600	2,000	1960		Adjoins a 1,100-acre (450 ha) reservoir in the Zuni Mountains.
Sugarite Canyon State Park	Colfax	3,600	1,500	6,950	2,120	1985		Interprets the ruins of a historic early-20th-century coal-mining camp.
Sumner Lake State Park	De Baca	6,700	2,700	4,300	1,300	1966		Adjoins a 4,500-acre (1,800 ha) reservoir on the Pecos River.
Ute Lake State Park	Quay	1,500	610	3,900	1,200	1964		Adjoins an 8,200-acre (3,300 ha) reservoir on the Canadian River.
Villanueva State Park	San Miguel	1,600	650	5,600	1,700	1967		Preserves a red sandstone canyon on the Pecos River.

== See also ==
- List of national parks of the United States
