= Northern Rio Grande National Heritage Area =

United States National Heritage Area in New Mexico

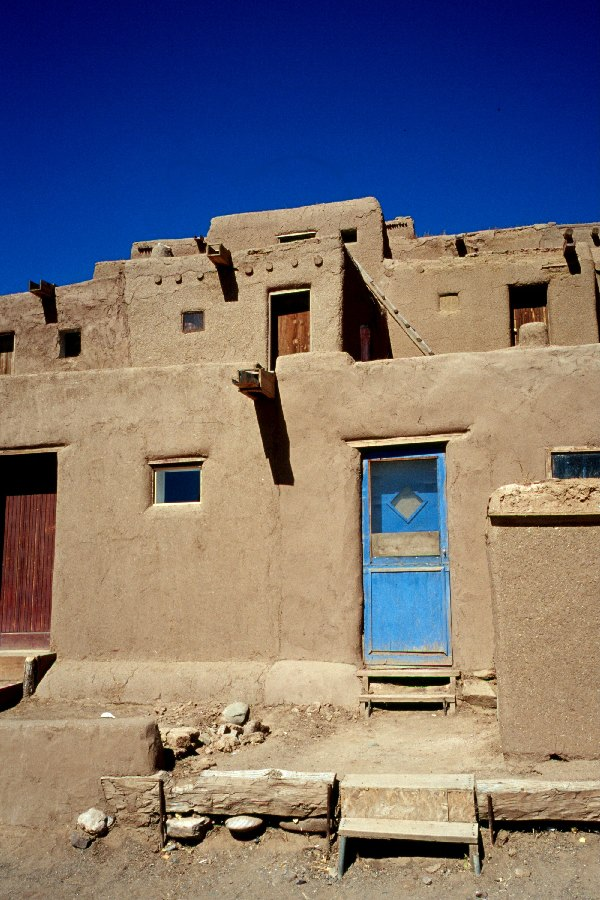
Taos Pueblo.

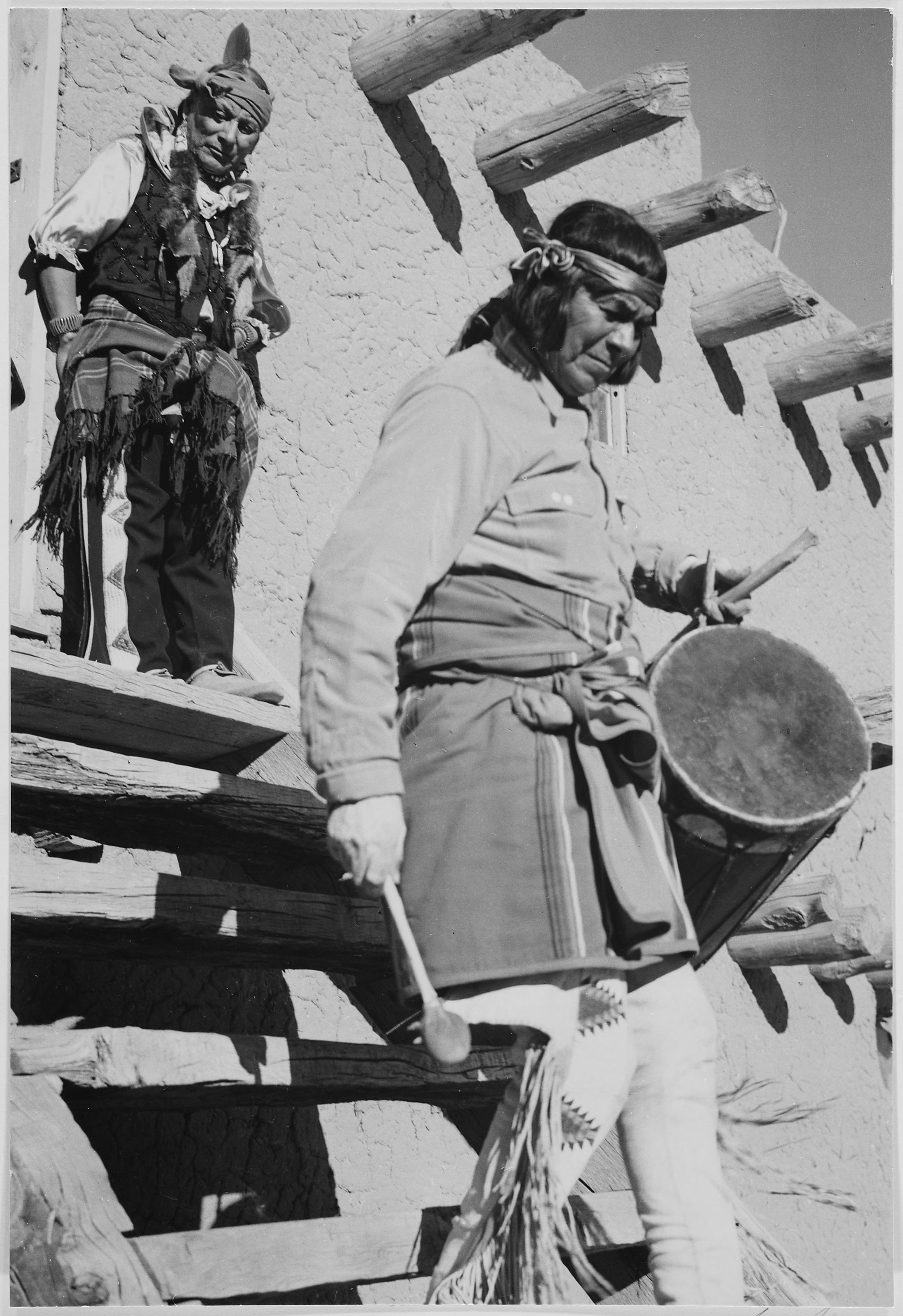
San Ildefonso Pueblo, by Ansel Adams.

Northern Rio Grande National Heritage Area is a federally designated National Heritage Area in the U.S. state of New Mexico. The national heritage area includes a section of the upper Rio Grande Valley that has been inhabited by the Puebloan peoples since the early Pre-Columbian era.

Three counties, Santa Fe, Taos, and Rio Arriba are included in the designated National Heritage Area. The Northern Rio Grande National Heritage Area was authorized in 2006 by Public Law 109-338.

== Sites ==
=== Pueblos ===
Eight pueblos are included in the National Heritage Area:

- Nambé Pueblo
- Ohkay Owingeh Pueblo,
- Picuris Pueblo
- Pojoaque Pueblo
- San Ildefonso Pueblo
- Santa Clara Pueblo
- Taos Pueblo — a World Heritage Site.
- Tesuque Pueblo

The Jicarilla Apache reservation is also within the heritage area.

=== Spanish colonial sites ===
The heritage area also commemorates the influence of Hispanic colonists from the Viceroyalty of New Spain (colonial México), who arrived in the late 1590s and onwards.

Spanish colonial sites in the National Heritage Area include:

- Historic center−core of Santa Fe
- Ranchos de Taos
- 16 National Historic Landmarks
- 270 other historic properties, including those on the National Register of Historic Places, of the pre-statehood era.

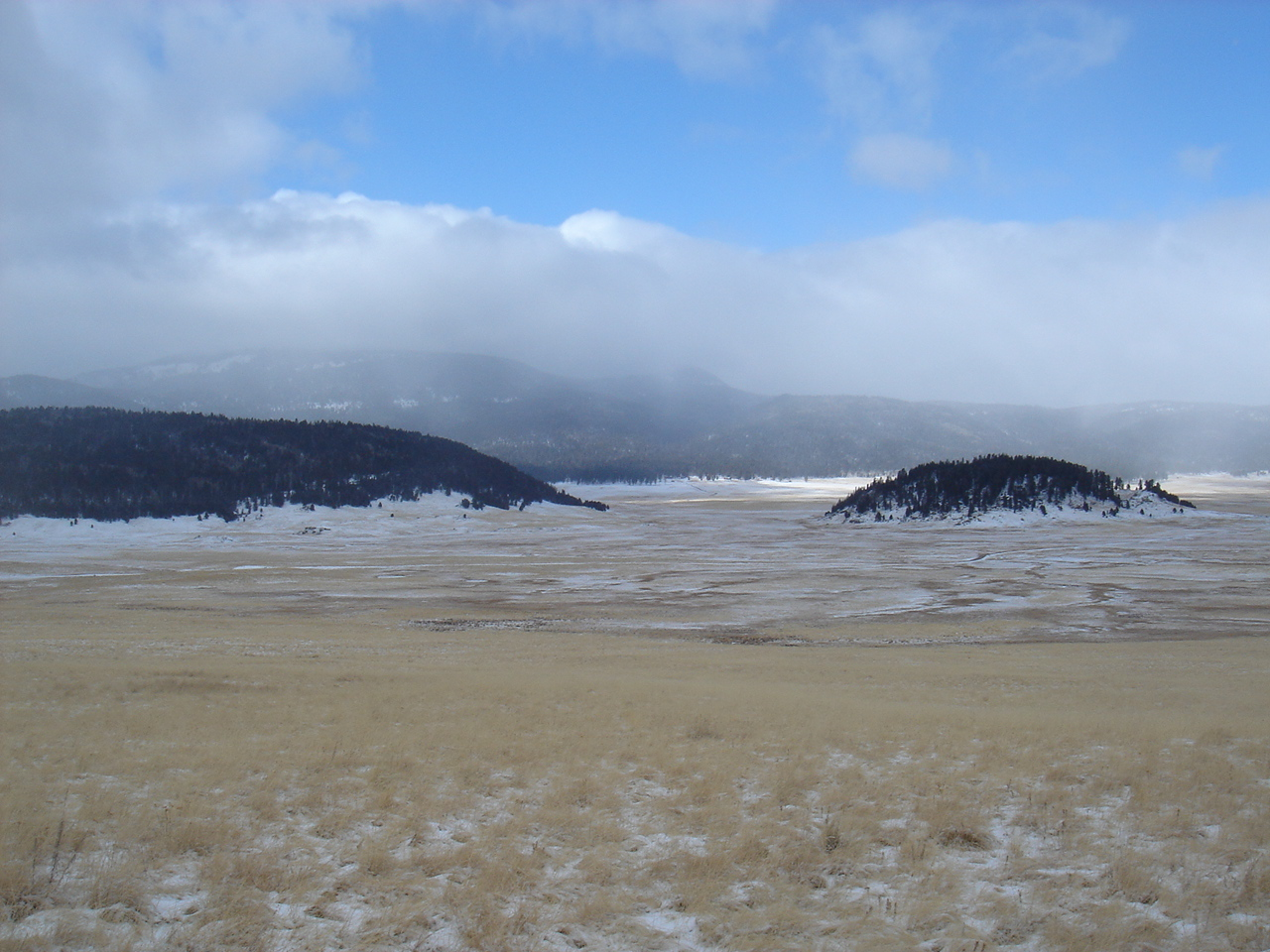
Valles Caldera National Preserve.

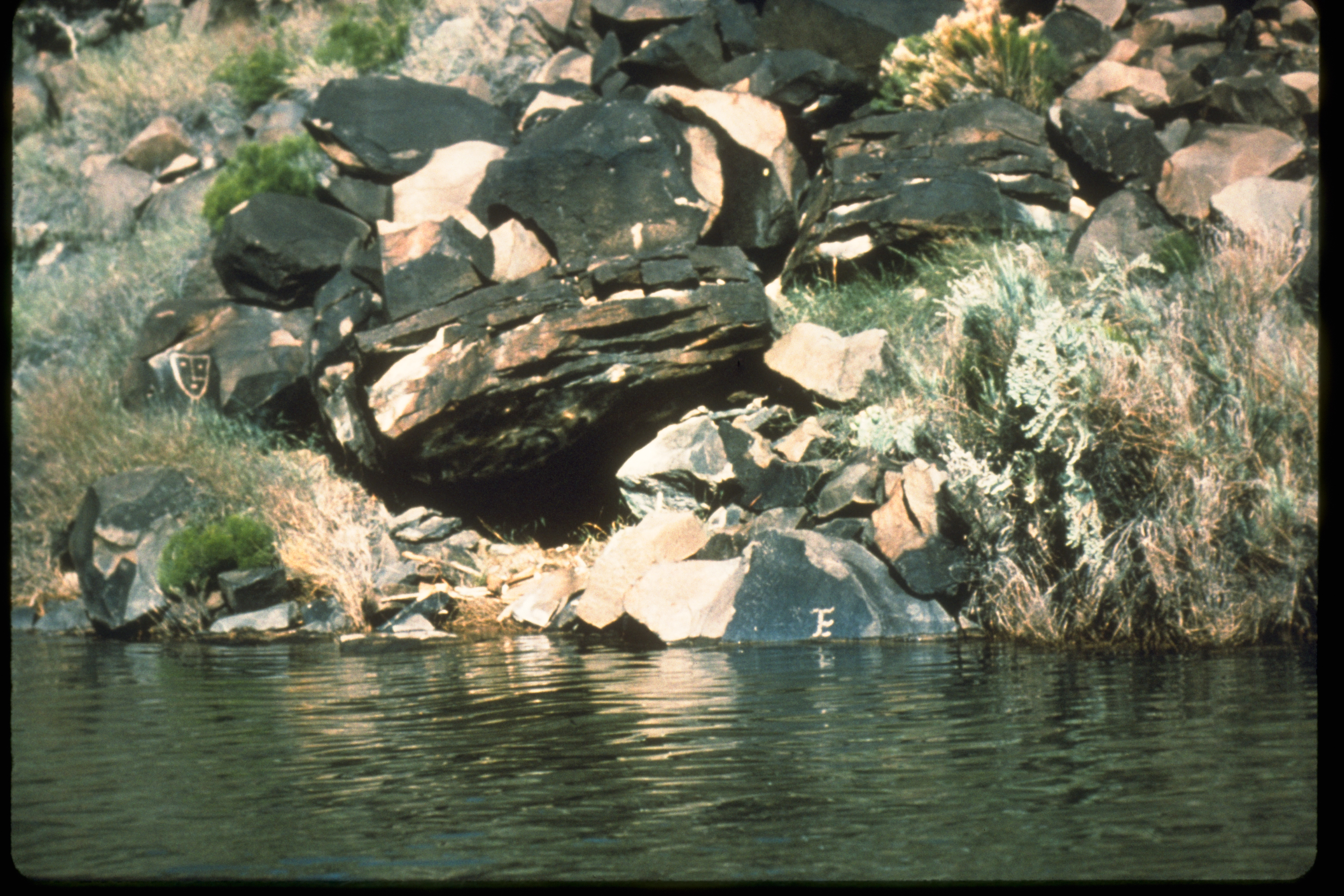
Bandelier National Monument.

== Natural areas ==
Natural areas protected at the federal level within the National Heritage Area include portions of:

- Santa Fe National Forest
- Carson National Forest
- Valles Caldera National Preserve
- Bandelier National Monument
- Pecos National Monument.

=== State parks ===
New Mexico state parks within the heritage area include:

- Cerrillos Hills State Park
- Hyde Memorial State Park
- Heron Lake State Park
- El Vado Lake State Park

=== Scenic drives and byways ===
Scenic drives and byways with sections through parts of the heritage area include:

- Enchanted Circle Scenic Byway
- Puyé Scenic Byway
- El Camino Real National Scenic Byway
- Route 66 National Scenic Byway
- Santa Fe National Forest Scenic Byway
- Santa Fe Trail National Scenic Byway
- Wild Rivers Back Country Scenic Byway
- High Road to Taos

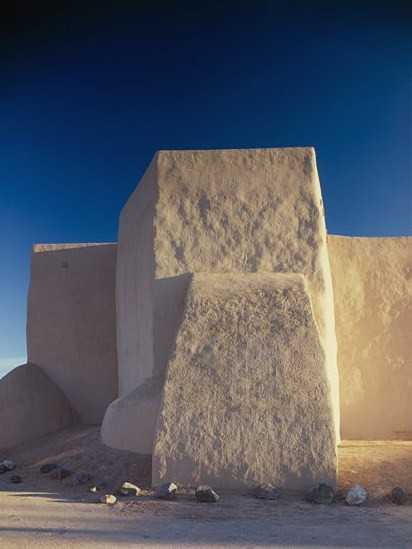
San Francisco de Asis Mission Church, Ranchos de Taos.

== See also ==
- Ancient Pueblo peoples
- Puebloan peoples
- Colonial New Mexico
  - Santa Fe de Nuevo México Province
- Northern New Mexico
- National Historic Landmarks in New Mexico
  - National Register of Historic Places listings in Rio Arriba County, New Mexico
  - National Register of Historic Places listings in Santa Fe County, New Mexico
  - National Register of Historic Places listings in Taos County, New Mexico
