= Santa Rosa Dam =

Dam in New Mexico, United States

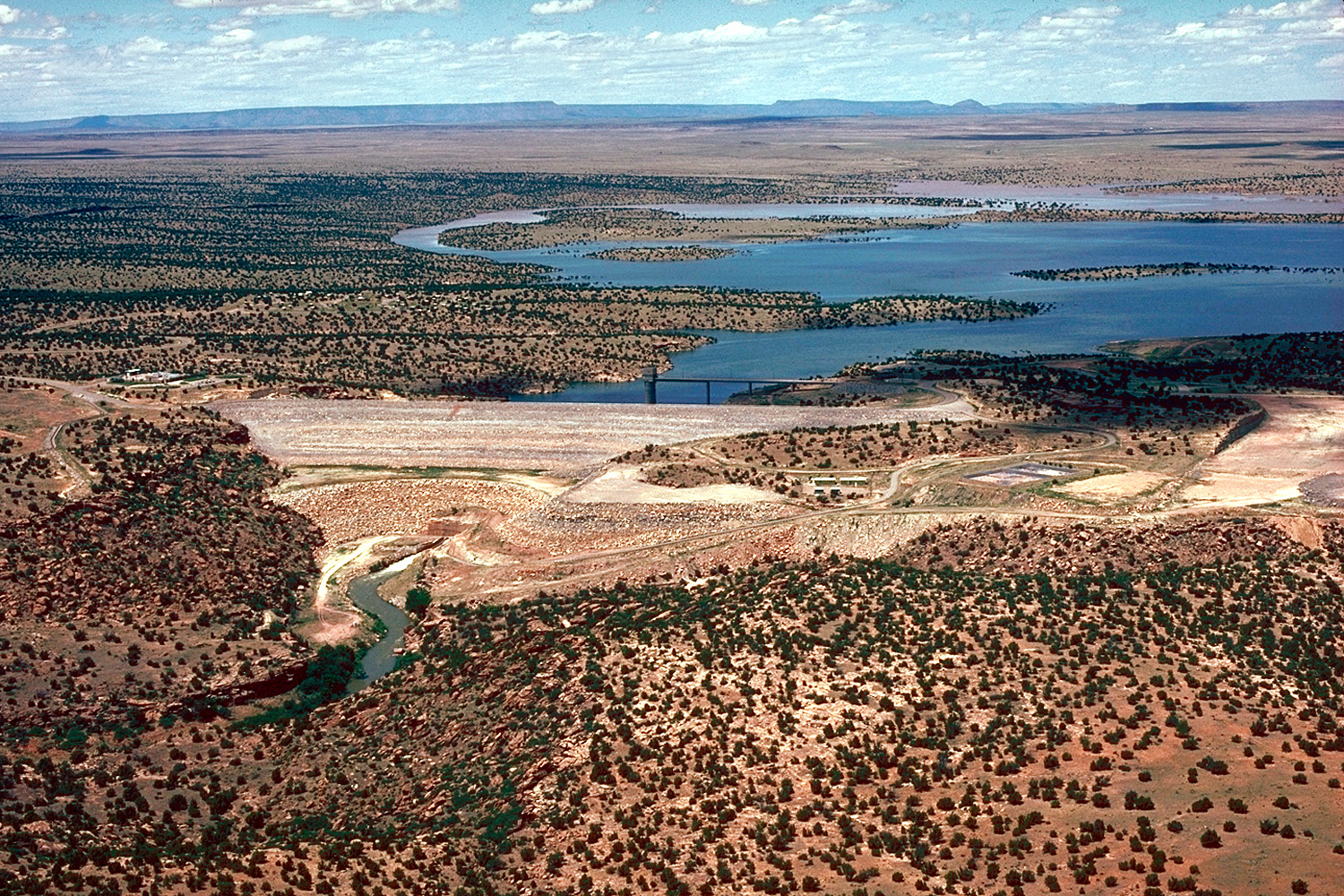
- Santa Rosa Dam and Reservoir

- Location within New Mexico
- Country: United States
- Location: Guadalupe County, New Mexico
- Coordinates: 35.0283°N 104.6886°W
- Purpose: Irrigation and flood control
- Opening date: 1979

Dam and spillways
- Height: 214 feet (65 m)
- Length: 1,900 feet (580 m)

Reservoir
- Total capacity: 717,000 acre-feet (884,000,000 m^{3})
- Surface area: 26 square miles (67 km^{2})

Santa Rosa Dam (National ID # NM00158) is a dam in Guadalupe County, New Mexico.

The earthen dam was constructed by the United States Army Corps of Engineers, with a height of 214 feet (65 m) and 1,900 feet (580 m) long at its crest. The uppermost major dam along the Pecos River, it serves for irrigation water storage and flood control. Originally proposed in 1951 and authorized in 1954, the dam (then known as the Los Esteros project) generated controversy, as the Fort Sumner Irrigation District which depended on the Pecos River contended it would increase evaporation rates. It was not until 1971 when an agreement was reached to reduce the permanent storage pool at Los Esteros. Construction lasted from 1974 to 1979, and the name of the dam and lake were changed to Santa Rosa the following year.

The reservoir it creates, Santa Rosa Lake, has a normal water surface area of 26 square miles (67 km^{2}), a maximum capacity of 717,000 acre-feet (0.884 km^{3}), and a normal capacity of 200,000 acre-feet (0.25 km^{3}). Recreation includes fishing (for largemouth bass, catfish and walleye), boating, camping, and other activities at the adjacent Santa Rosa Lake State Park.
