= Mesilla Valley Bosque State Park =

State park in New Mexico, United States

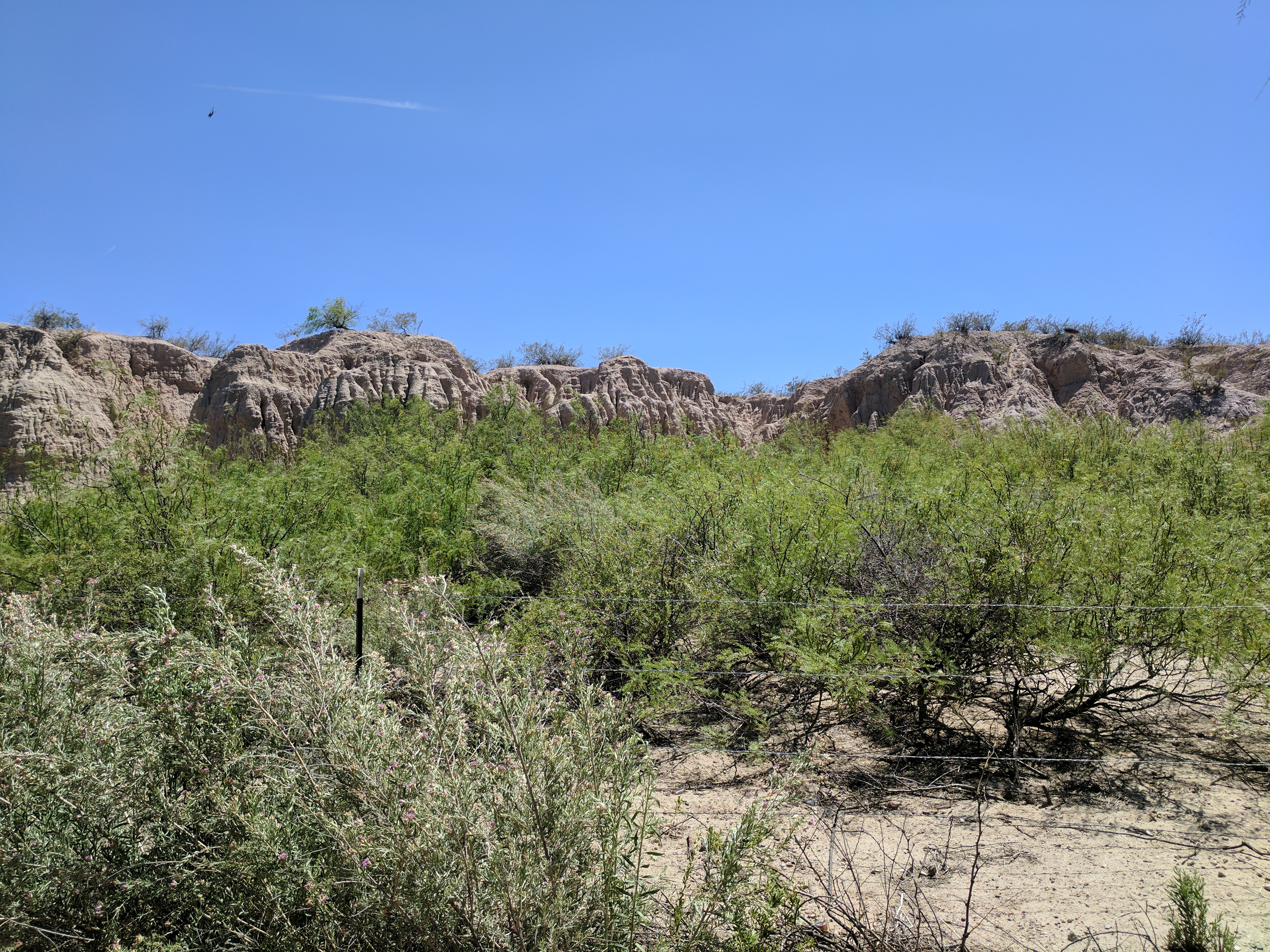

- Location within New Mexico
- Location: Doña Ana County, New Mexico, United States
- Coordinates: 32°15′37″N 106°49′32″W
- Area: 305 acres (123 ha)
- Elevation: 3,879 ft (1,182 m)
- Established: 2003
- Administrator: New Mexico Energy, Minerals and Natural Resources Department
- Website: Official website

Mesilla Valley Bosque State Park is a state park of New Mexico, United States, preserving a riverside forest (a bosque) along the Rio Grande. The park is located near Las Cruces and just west of Mesilla. The park encompasses approximately 305 acres (123 ha) at an elevation of 3,900 feet (1,200 m). The park consists of river woodlands and restored wetlands. It is used by migratory birds, and is popular for birdwatching, walking, and bicycling. It is a day-use only park, and camping is not allowed. An active Friends of Mesilla Valley Bosque State Park group exists to contribute to the park's restoration, recreation, and education missions.
