= Percha Dam State Park =

State park in New Mexico, United States

- Location within New Mexico
- Location: Sierra County, New Mexico, United States
- Coordinates: 32°52′06″N 107°18′23″W
- Area: 80 acres (32 ha)
- Elevation: 4,447 ft (1,355 m)
- Established: 1970
- Administrator: New Mexico Energy, Minerals and Natural Resources Department
- Website: Official website

Percha Dam State Park is a state park of New Mexico, United States, encompassing 80 acres (32 ha) on the Rio Grande 21 miles (34 km) south of Truth or Consequences, New Mexico. The park is popular for fishing, rafting, kayaking, and bird watching, especially during the spring and autumn migration seasons.

The dam is less than 2 miles (3.2 km) downstream of the much larger Caballo Dam, and therefore Percha Dam's reservoir is essentially a wide, slow moving section of river. The dam's purpose is to raise the elevation of the Rio Grande slightly to allow irrigation of the chile pepper crop downstream.
