= Fenton Lake State Park =

State park in New Mexico, US

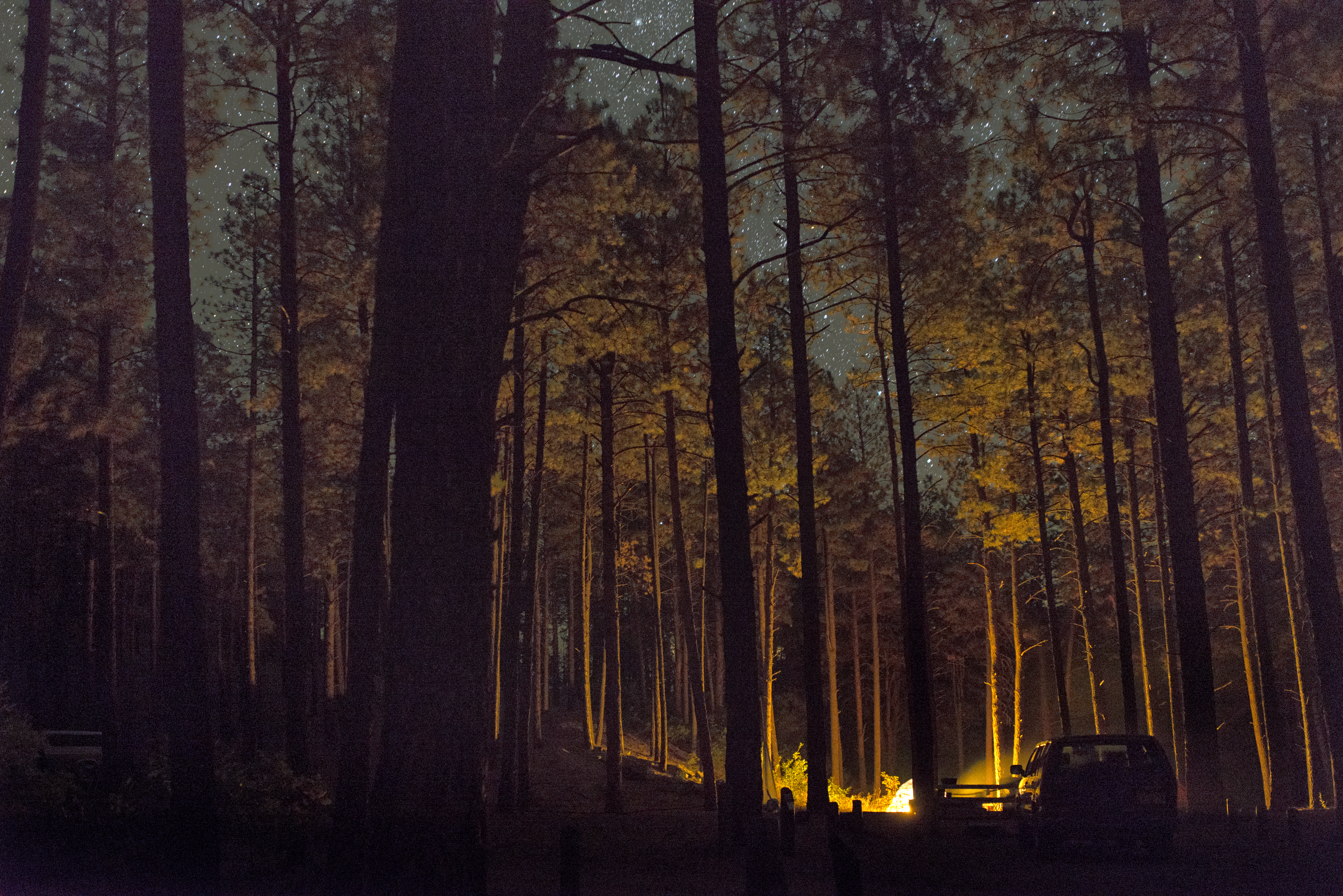
- Campground at night, Fenton Lake State Park, October 2015

- Location within New Mexico
- Location: Sandoval County, New Mexico, United States
- Coordinates: 35°52′57″N 106°43′35″W
- Area: 700 acres (280 ha)
- Elevation: 7,650 ft (2,330 m)
- Established: 1984
- Administrator: New Mexico Energy, Minerals and Natural Resources Department
- Website: Official website
Fenton Lake
- Location within New Mexico
- Location: Fenton Lake State Park, New Mexico
- Coordinates: 35°53′00″N 106°43′26″W
- Basin countries: United States
- Surface area: 37 acres (15 ha)

Fenton Lake State Park is a state park of New Mexico, United States, located 33 miles (53 km) north of San Ysidro, in the Jemez Mountains. The 37-acre (15 ha) lake is a popular fishing destination.

== History ==
Land for the park was first purchased in 1940 when the State Game Commission paid Elijah McClean Fenton, Sr., $2,176 for 80 acres using Wildlife Restoration funds. In 1976, Fenton Lake was featured as a filming location, showing the splash-landing of an alien spacecraft, in the movie The Man Who Fell to Earth.
