= Rio Grande Nature Center State Park =

State Park in New Mexico, United States

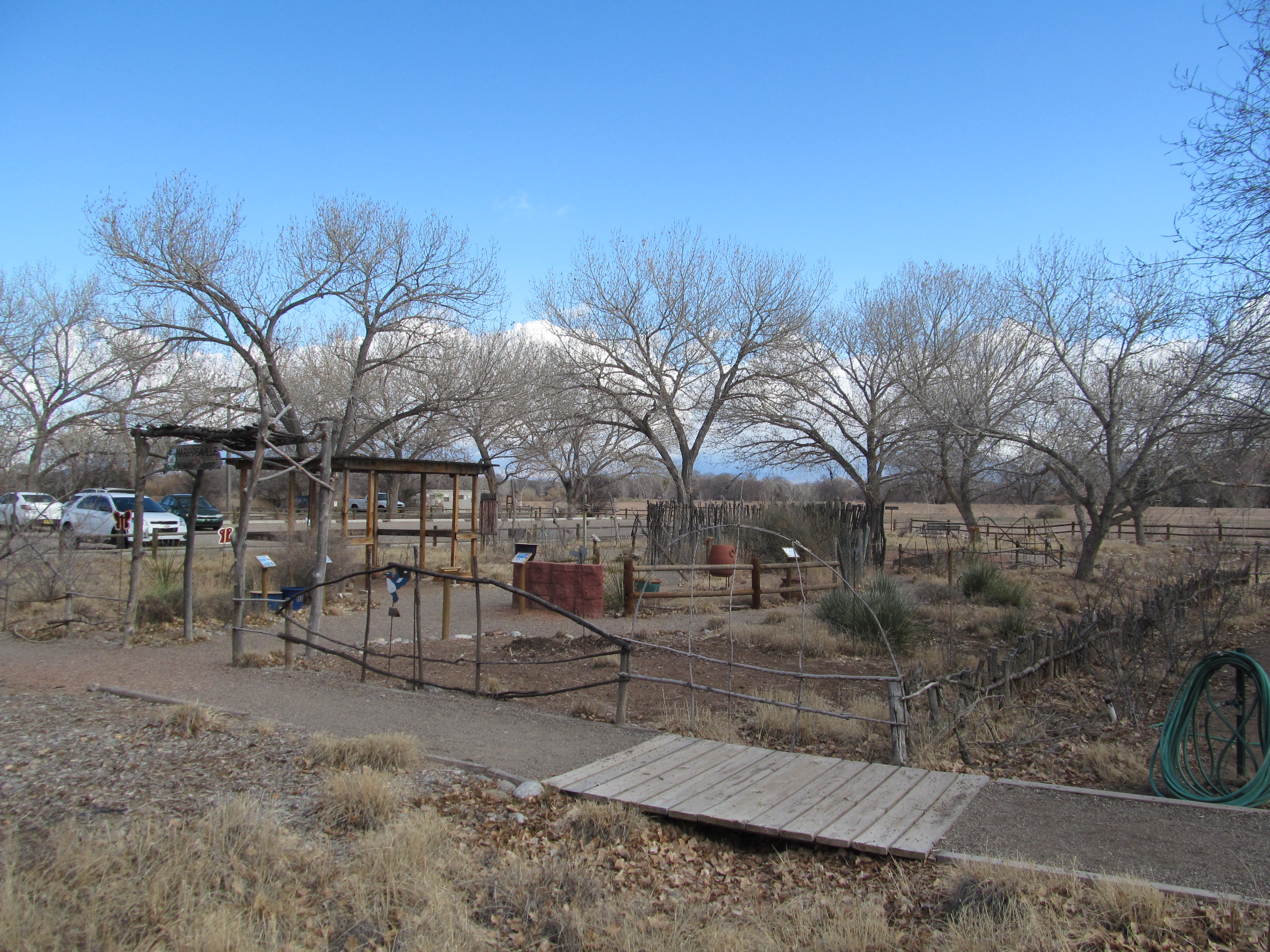
- Mariposaville Pollinator Habitat

- Location within New Mexico
- Location: Bernalillo County, New Mexico, United States
- Coordinates: 35°07′43″N 106°40′58″W
- Area: 38 acres (15 ha)
- Elevation: 4,968 ft (1,514 m)
- Established: 1982
- Administrator: New Mexico Energy, Minerals and Natural Resources Department
- Website: Official website

The Rio Grande Nature Center State Park is a New Mexico state park located adjacent to the Rio Grande in Albuquerque, New Mexico, US. The Rio Grande Nature Center is a 38-acre urban wildlife preserve established in 1982. About two thirds of the grounds of the park are set aside as habitat for wildlife. The remaining acreage contains a visitors' center, two gardens, several wildlife viewing areas, an education building and a building housing the non-profit Wildlife Rescue, Inc. There are four constructed ponds which provide habitat for birds and other wildlife and which mimic wetland features of the historical flood plain of the Rio Grande.

== Visitor center ==
There is an element of ‘river-edge vernacular’ to the building; an 8-foot diameter, corrugated drainage culvert forms and frames the tunnel entry into the center. Upon entering, visitors become aware of the salient feature of both the preserve and the building: vertical, 8-foot-high, water-filled tubes encircle a sunken, ramped exhibit and viewing area. Light shimmers through these tubes from skylights to create an underwater effect. The ramp descends physically and symbolically to allow views of the vast forage areas, the marshlands and a reverse-periscope underwater image of the pond. At each stage along the ramp, interpretive displays augment the views; similarly, the exhibits complement interpretive trails which lace the refuge.

Features of the visitors' center include the library/observation room overlooking one of the park's ponds; exhibits which familiarize visitors with the Middle Rio Grande bosque ecosystem; the Discovery Room, full of educational and entertaining activities for kids; the Nature Shop, operated by the Friends of the Rio Grande Nature Center to benefit the park and the park's headquarters.

== Trails and birdwatching ==
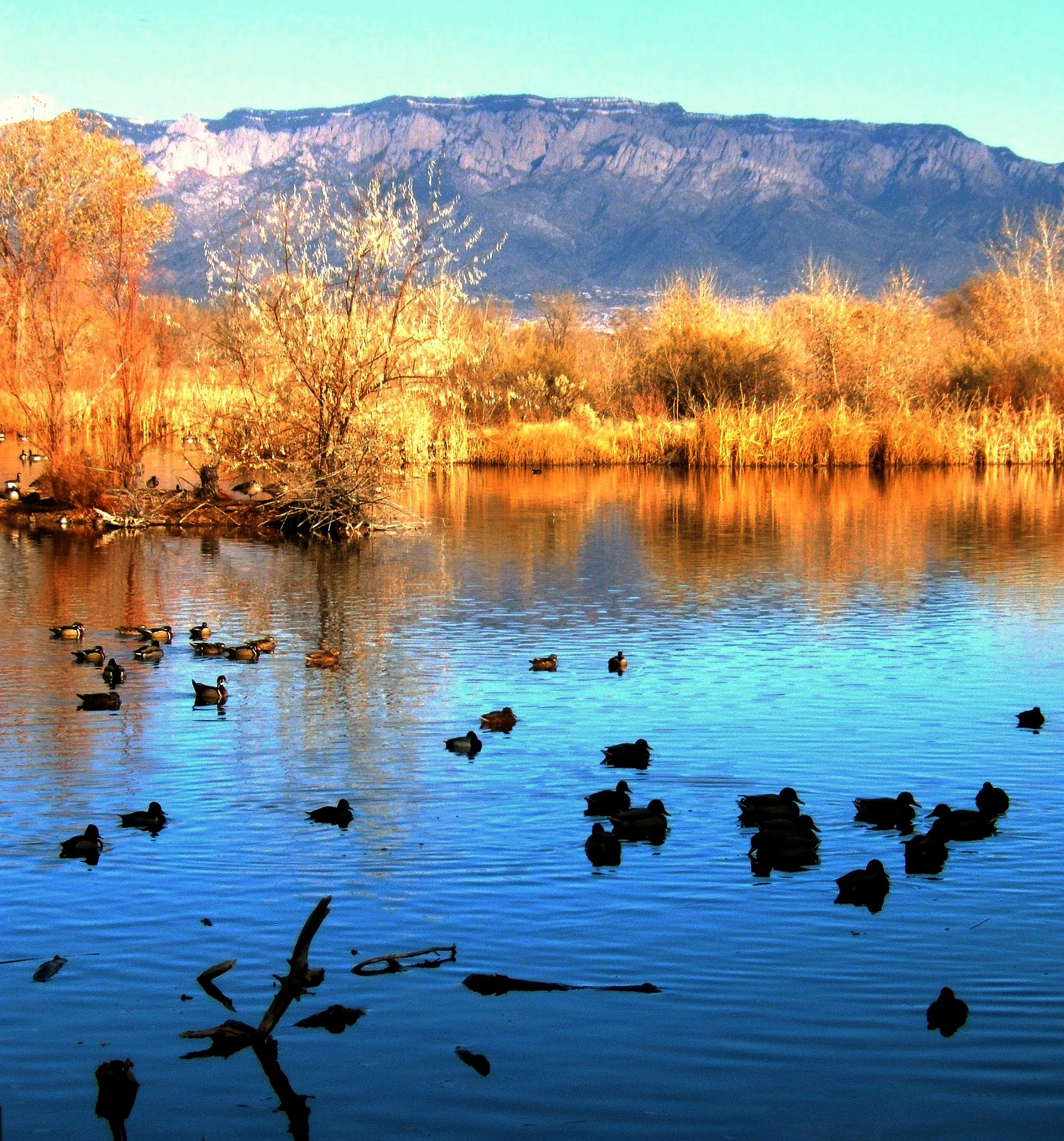
Rio Grande Nature Center

Visitors to the Rio Grande Nature Center may watch wildlife from viewing blinds overlooking two of the ponds as well as from feeding stations in the gardens and along the trails through the grounds of the park. Visitors also use the park as a stepping off point for visiting the Rio Grande and surrounding riparian forest, or bosque, as it's locally known. A round-trip walk to the river and back on either of the loop trails associated with the Rio Grande Nature Center is about one-half mile from the parking lot. Visitors may also walk through the bosque north and south from the park along most of its 20-mile length.

Regular programming at the park includes guided bird and nature walks, lectures, workshops, kids' classes and three annual festivals. Thousands of students from around New Mexico visit the park on field trips each year. Visitors from all over the world seek out the park each year as both a birding hotspot and to experience the unique visitors center, designed by architect, Antoine Predock. The visitor center:

"...acts as a unobtrusive ‘blind’ affording visitors' discrete panoramic views of the wildfowl areas. Seen from the main approach, the berms and bunker-like perimeter structure of rough-formed concrete blend into the wooded environment."

The park is home to many species of flora and fauna including, most prominently, the Rio Grande Cottonwood. Animals observed at the park include: over 300 species of birds; mammals including desert cottontail, rock squirrel, North American porcupine, muskrat, coyote, Botta's pocket gopher, American beaver, raccoon, skunk, long-tailed weasel and many species of small mammals; reptiles and amphibians such as painted turtles (aquatic), box turtles (terrestrial), Woodhouse toads, whiptail lizards and coachwhip snakes; lastly about 40 species of dragonflies and many other fascinating invertebrates. Friends of the Rio Grande Nature Center volunteers are engaged in several different projects: restoration and gardening for wildlife, monitoring for aquatic insect and bird species, monthly water quality monitoring, and educational work about the bosque ecosystem.
