= Villanueva State Park =

State park in New Mexico, United States

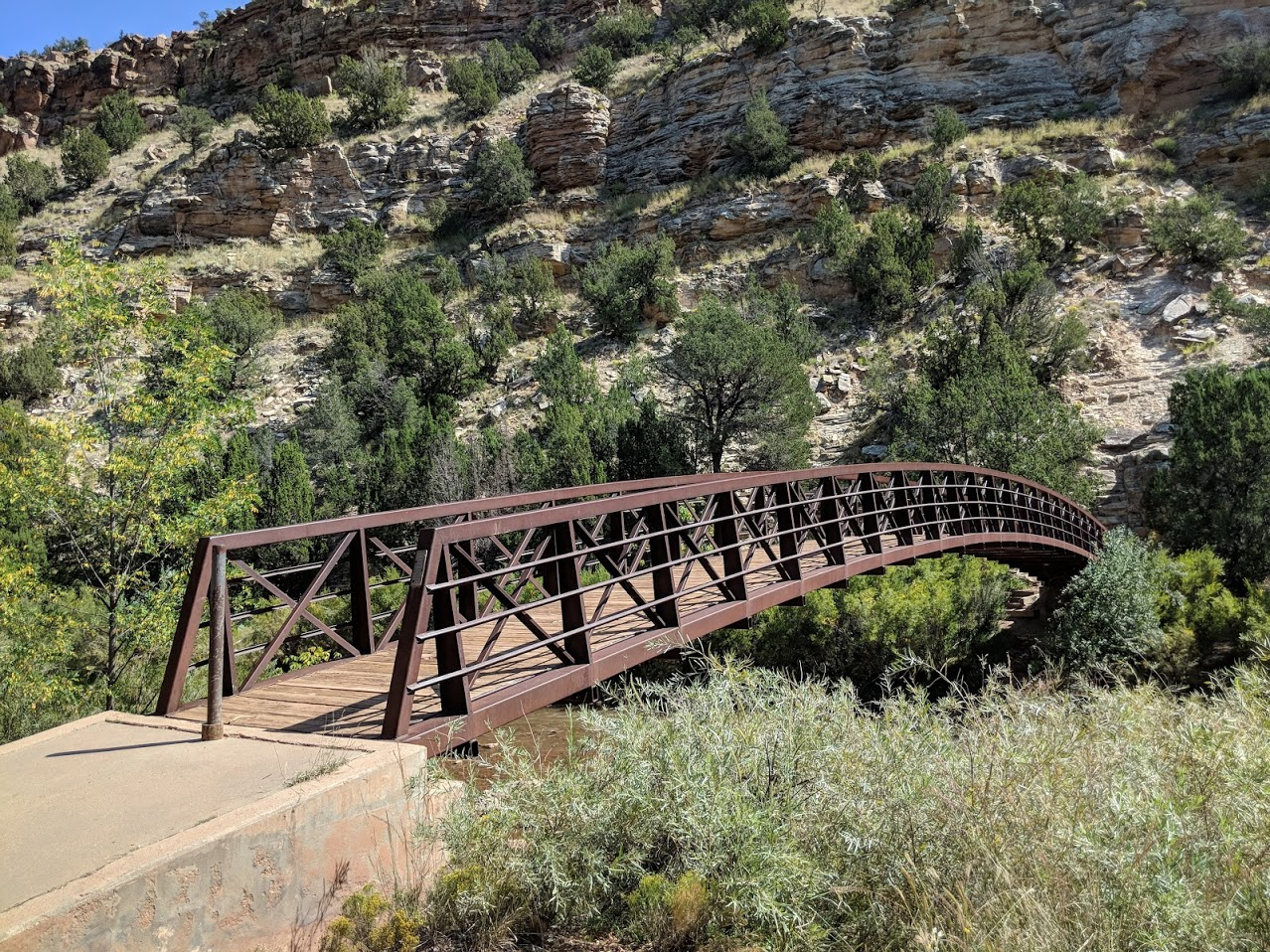
- Pedestrian bridge over the Pecos River leading to the Vista Trail

- Location within New Mexico
- Location: San Miguel County, New Mexico, United States
- Coordinates: 35°15′55″N 105°20′40″W
- Area: 1,600 acres (650 ha)
- Elevation: 5,600 ft (1,700 m)
- Established: 1967
- Administrator: New Mexico State Parks Division
- Website: Official website

Villanueva State Park is a state park of New Mexico, United States, located on the banks of the Pecos River. The park features red and yellow sandstone cliffs, cottonwood trees, and other native plants. Villanueva State Park's elevation is 6,110 feet (1862 m) above sea level. The park sits in the shift from The Rocky Mountains and The Great Plains. The park is located southwest of the town of Las Vegas, 35 miles (56 km) New Mexico. While on the lookout trails of Villanueva State Park, one can view the Pecos River.

== History ==
Villanueva State Park was established in 1967, when land was donated by San Miguel del Vado Land Grant Board of Trustees. When the land was granted in 1967, the park was 67 acres which included 4,800 feet of river access from the park. Later, 3.5 miles of the Pecos River was opened to the public from the park.

== State marker inscription ==
"Couched between high red sandstone bluffs in a beautiful valley of the Pecos River, this park is located near the picturesque Spanish colonial village of Villanueva. The park offers hiking trails with historical markers and camping/picnicking sites"

== Geology ==
Outcrops in the park are of the Recent, Late Pleistocene, and Permian ages. The earliest rocks form the base of the 300 to 500-foot-high cliffs of Glorieta Mesa and were conveyed during the Middle to Late Permian period, around 268–245 million years ago. The earliest rocks belonging to the Permian Yeso Formation form the lower slopes below the cliffs, withslender bands containinglocalized layers of red-orange calcareous siltstone and dolomitelimestone up to 15 feet (4.6 m) thick. It consists of alternating layers offine-grained to medium-grained calcareous quartzsandstone. Water in the Pecos River south headed to Villanueva State Park showed signs of base metals and mercury, elevated levels of copper, lead, and zinc.

== Weather ==
Villanueva State Park's weather stays in the moderate zone for New Mexico. December and January are the coldest months at the park being a low of 23 °F (−5 °C) and a high of 49–50 °F (9–10 °C). The warmest months for Villanueva State Park are in June and July, where the high is 90 °F (32 °C) and the low reaching 55–59 °F (13–15 °C).
