= Morphy Lake State Park =

State park in New Mexico

- Location within New Mexico
- Location: Mora County, New Mexico, United States
- Coordinates: 35°56′26″N 105°23′31″W
- Area: 30 acres (12 ha)
- Elevation: 7,953 ft (2,424 m)
- Established: 1965
- Administrator: New Mexico State Parks Division
- Website: Official website

Morphy Lake State Park is a state park of New Mexico, United States, located 7 miles (11 km) southwest of Mora in the Sangre de Cristo Mountains. "The park is one of New Mexico's smaller state parks, at only 30 acres (12 ha), and the lake has a surface area of approximately 15 acres (6.1 ha)."

"The park is popular for fishing, camping, and picnicking, however, there is no running water, so visitors must pack their own. The lake is stocked with trout, and kokanee salmon. Boats are allowed on the lake, but no gas powered motors are allowed. Its high altitude (8,000 ft) and location in northern New Mexico cause the lake to freeze over in the winter, allowing ice fishing to take place."
