= Storrie Lake State Park =

State park in New Mexico, United States

- Location within New Mexico
- Location: San Miguel County, New Mexico, United States
- Coordinates: 35°39′23″N 105°13′55″W
- Area: 80 acres (32 ha)
- Elevation: 6,607 ft (2,014 m)
- Established: 1960
- Administrator: New Mexico State Parks Division
- Named for: R. C. Storrie
- Website: Official website

Storrie Lake State Park is a state park in New Mexico, United States, located 4 miles (6.4 km) north of Las Vegas, New Mexico in the Sangre de Cristo Mountains. The land area of the park is 81 acres (33 ha); the lake has a surface area of approximately 1,100 acres (450 ha).

Activities at the park include camping, hiking, fishing, boating, and windsurfing.
