= Oasis State Park =

State park in New Mexico, United States

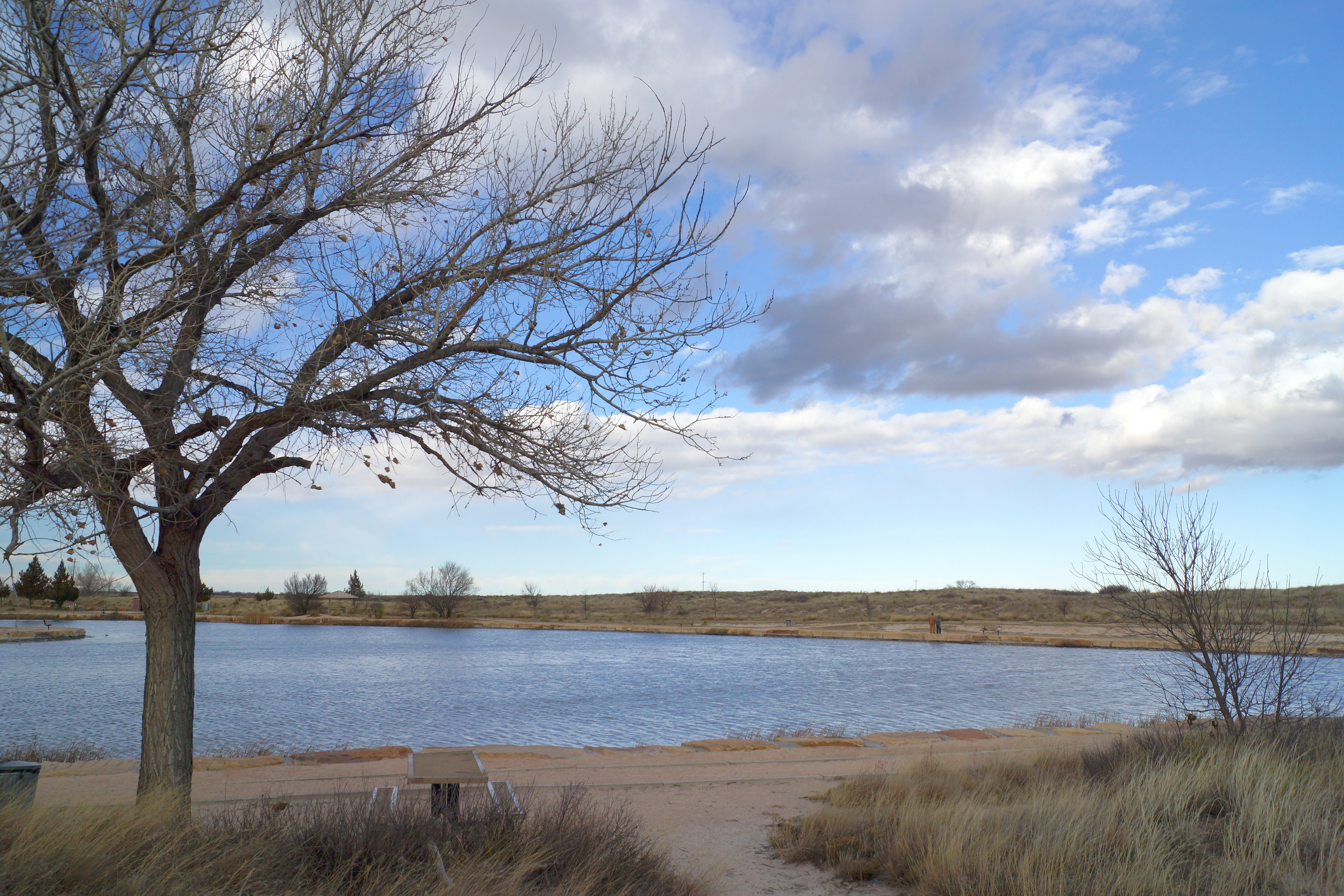

- Location within New Mexico
- Location: Roosevelt County, New Mexico, United States
- Coordinates: 34°15′36″N 103°21′07″W
- Area: 193 acres (78 ha)
- Elevation: 4,058 ft (1,237 m)
- Established: 1961
- Administrator: New Mexico State Parks Division
- Website: Official website

Oasis State Park is a state park of New Mexico, United States, located north of Portales in Roosevelt County known for its fishing lake and sand dunes.
