= Santa Rosa Lake State Park =

State park in New Mexico, United States

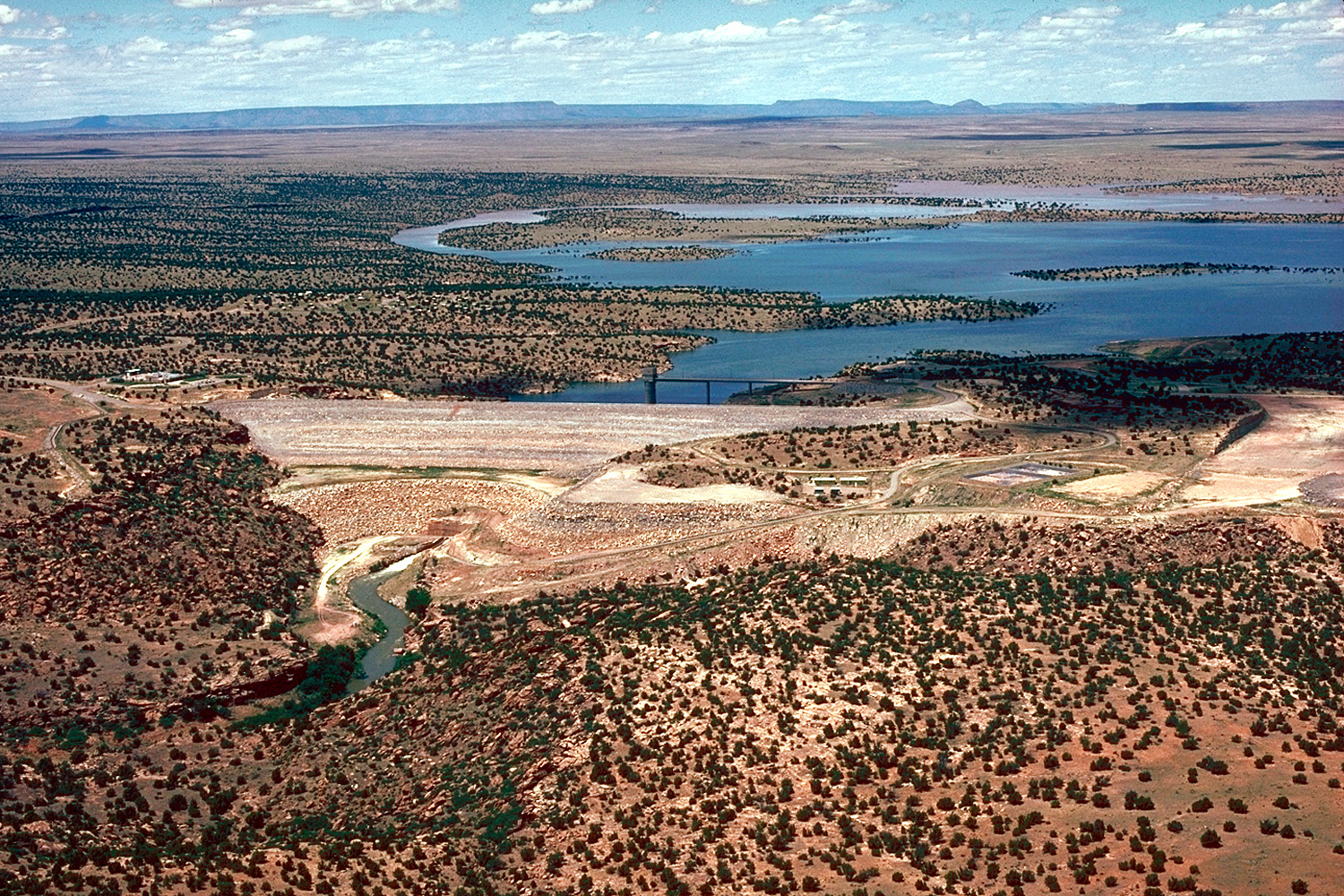
- Santa Rosa Lake and Dam

- Location within New Mexico
- Location: Guadalupe County, New Mexico, United States
- Coordinates: 35°02′06″N 104°41′06″W
- Area: 550 acres (220 ha)
- Elevation: 4,751 ft (1,448 m)
- Established: 1981
- Administrator: New Mexico State Parks Division
- Website: Official website

Santa Rosa Lake State Park is a state park that opened in 1981 in Guadalupe County, New Mexico. The park elevation is 4,800 feet (1,500 m) above sea level. The park is located 7 miles (11 km) north of the town of Santa Rosa via New Mexico Route 91.

== Nature ==
=== Animals ===
The park features the large 3,800-acre (15 km^{2}) Santa Rosa Reservoir that is home to various fish species including largemouth bass, catfish and walleye.

=== Flora ===
Juniper and pinyon are the dominant trees species in the park

== Gallery ==
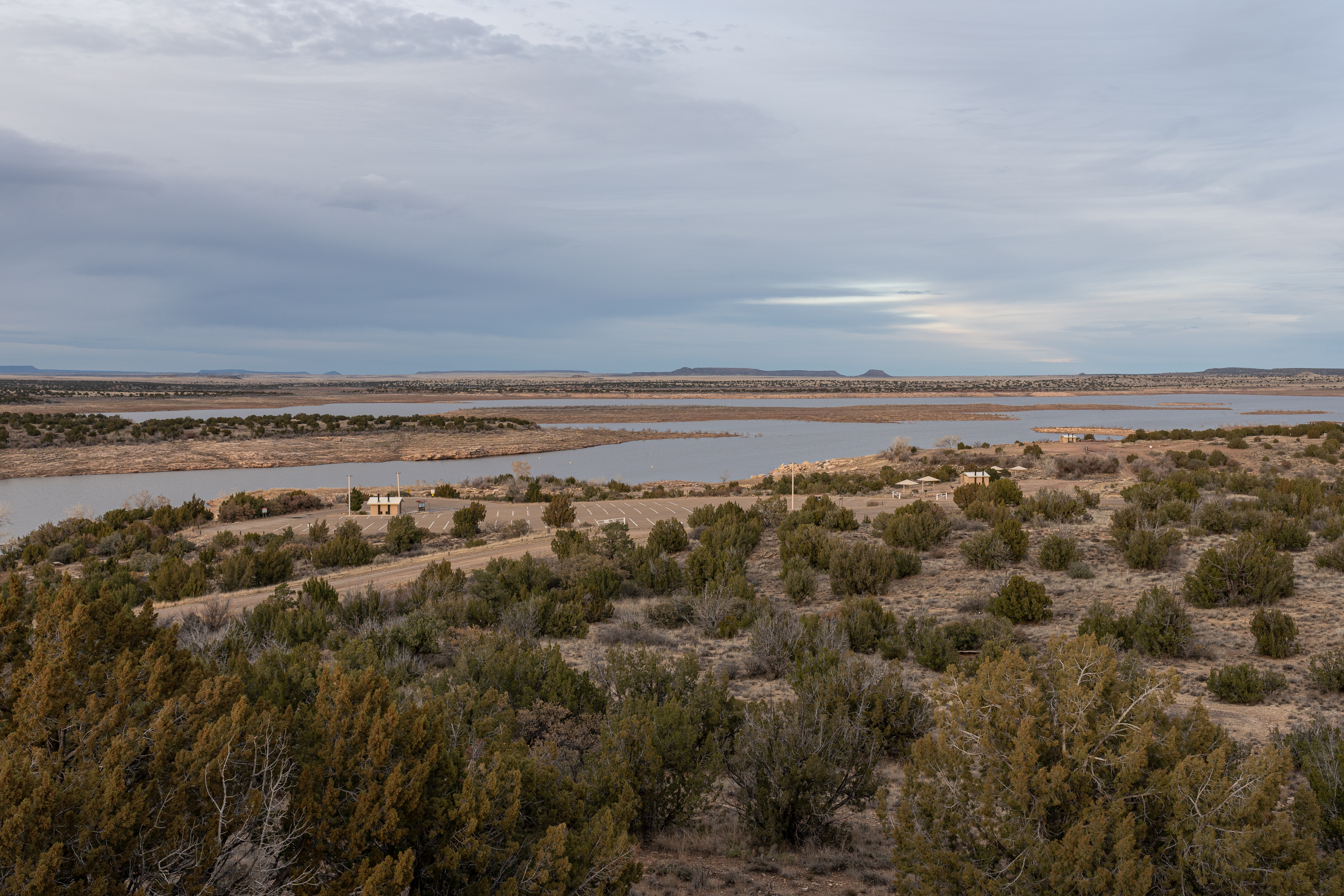
Looking north-northeast over Santa Rosa Lake State Park

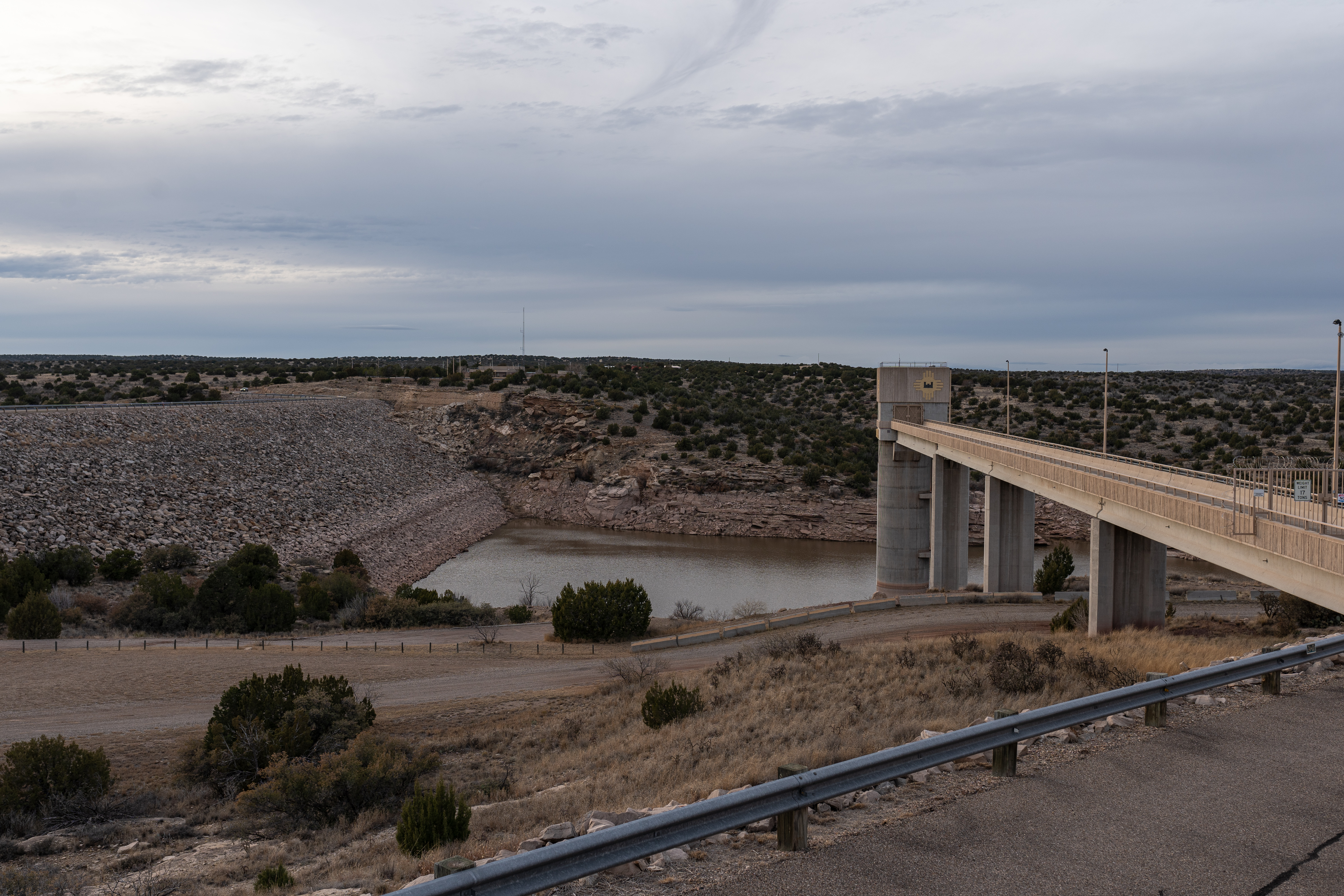
The earthen dam and tower
