= Living Desert Zoo and Gardens State Park =

State park in New Mexico, United States

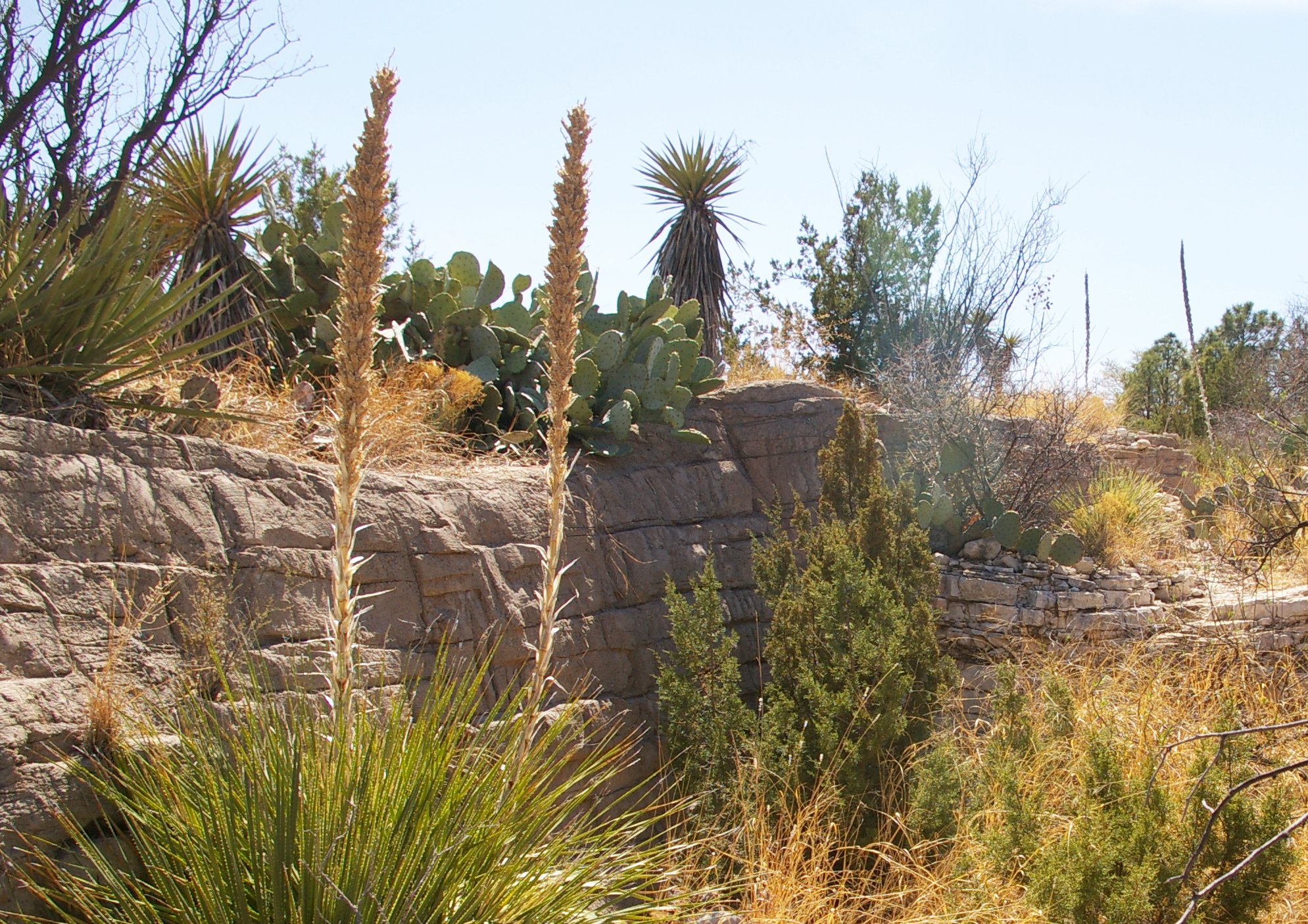
- View of a trail at the Living Desert Zoo and Gardens State Park

- Location within New Mexico
- Location: Eddy County, New Mexico, United States
- Coordinates: 32°26′30″N 104°16′45″W
- Area: 1,500 acres (610 ha)
- Elevation: 3,482 ft (1,061 m)
- Established: 1967
- Administrator: New Mexico State Parks Division
- Website: Official website

The Living Desert Zoo and Gardens State Park, formerly the Living Desert Zoological and Botanical State Park, is a zoo and botanical garden displaying plants and animals of the Chihuahuan Desert in their native habitats. It is located off U.S. Route 285 at an elevation of 3,200 feet (980 m) atop the Ocotillo Hills overlooking the north edge of Carlsbad, New Mexico, and the Pecos River.

== History ==
The park originated in 1967 with the donation of 360 acres of land by Neil Wills and Robert Light followed by the additional donation of 760 acres by the Eddy County Commission. The park was an accredited member of the Association of Zoos and Aquariums (AZA) between 2002 and 2023. The park lost its accreditation in 2023.

== Exhibits ==
The zoo features more than forty native animal species, including pronghorn, badger, bison, bobcats, mule deer, elk, kit fox, Gila monster, cougar, prairie dogs, reptiles, fourteen species of snakes, and Mexican wolves. An aviary contains golden eagles, hawks, owls, a roadrunner, songbirds, and turkeys. The gardens feature a greenhouse and hundreds of cacti and succulents from around the world, including acacia, agave, small barrel cactus, cholla, ocotillo, prickly pear, saguaro, sotol (Dasylirion wheeleri), and yucca.

1.3 miles (2.1 km) of self-guided trails lead through sand dunes, arroyos, and pinyon pine/juniper forest.

== See also ==
- List of botanical gardens in the United States
