= Hyde Memorial State Park =

State park in New Mexico, United States

- Location within New Mexico
- Location: Santa Fe County, New Mexico, United States
- Coordinates: 35°43′48″N 105°50′12″W
- Area: 350 acres (140 ha)
- Elevation: 8,300–9,400 ft (2,500–2,900 m)
- Established: 1938
- Administrator: New Mexico State Parks Division
- Named for: Benjamin Talbot Babbit Hyde
- Website: Official website

Hyde Memorial State Park is a state park of New Mexico, United States, located 8 miles (13 km) northeast of Santa Fe in the Sangre de Cristo Mountains. Summertime activities include hiking and camping, the park is popular for tubing on the snow-covered hillsides in the winter.

The park was listed on the National Register of Historic Places in 2021.
