= New Mexico Department of Energy, Minerals, and Natural Resources =

New Mexico state cabinet department

New Mexico Energy, Minerals and Natural Resources Department

Department overview
- Jurisdiction: New Mexico
- Headquarters: Wendell Chino Building, 1220 South St. Francis Drive, Santa Fe, New Mexico
- Department executives: Erin Taylor, Acting Cabinet Secretary; Ben Shelton, Deputy Cabinet Secretary
- Website: www.emnrd.nm.gov

The New Mexico Energy, Minerals and Natural Resources Department (EMNRD) is a cabinet-level agency of the government of the US state of New Mexico. The department administers state programs related to energy policy, energy efficiency, renewable energy, oil and gas regulation, mining and mine reclamation, forestry, wildfire response, and state parks.

The department was created in 1987 through the merger of the former Energy and Minerals Department and the Natural Resources Department. EMNRD is headed by the Secretary of Energy, Minerals and Natural Resources, who is appointed by the governor with the consent of the New Mexico Senate. As of June 2026, Erin Taylor serves as Acting Cabinet Secretary.

== History ==
EMNRD was established in 1987 by the Energy, Minerals and Natural Resources Department Act. The act merged two cabinet agencies, the Energy and Minerals Department and the Natural Resources Department, into a single department.

Several of the department’s functions predate the 1987 merger. The State Parks Commission was established in 1933, followed by the Oil Conservation Commission in 1935 and the Soil and Water Conservation Commission in 1937. The Department of State Forestry was created in 1957, and the Coal Surface Commission was formed in 1972. The Energy and Minerals Department and the Natural Resources Department were both created in 1977 and existed as separate agencies until the 1987 reorganization.

The New Mexico Youth Conservation Corps was established in 1992 and administratively attached to EMNRD. The New Mexico Mining Commission was created in 1993.

== Organization ==
State law establishes the department’s major divisions and assigns statutory duties to each. The statutory divisions are Administrative Services, Energy Conservation and Management, Forestry, Mining and Minerals, Oil Conservation, and State Parks. Division directors are appointed by the secretary with the approval of the governor and are exempt from the state Personnel Act.

The Office of the Secretary provides policy direction for the department and manages communications with the governor, the New Mexico Legislature, and other state agencies. It also has administrative oversight of the Waste Isolation Pilot Plant Transportation Safety Coordinator, the New Mexico Department of Game and Fish, the New Mexico Game Commission, and the Youth Conservation Corps.

As of June 2026, the department’s leadership page listed Erin Taylor as Acting Cabinet Secretary and Ben Shelton as Deputy Cabinet Secretary. Taylor became acting secretary in December 2025 after the resignation of Melanie A. Kenderdine.

== Divisions ==
=== Administrative Services Division ===
The Administrative Services Division provides clerical, recordkeeping, personnel, budget, procurement, contracting, and other administrative support to the department. The current division director is Matthew Lovato.

=== Energy Conservation and Management Division ===
The Energy Conservation and Management Division, also known as ECAM, is New Mexico’s designated State Energy Office. The division administers programs related to renewable energy, energy efficiency, alternative fuels, clean transportation, energy tax credits, geothermal resources, grid modernization, energy resilience, and the safe transportation of radioactive waste.

ECAM receives funding through the federal State Energy Program and administers several state and federal programs, including renewable energy and energy efficiency tax credits, energy savings performance contract review, the Energy Efficiency Revolving Loan Fund Program, the Community Energy Efficiency Development Program, the Grid Modernization Grant Program, and the federally funded Preventing Outages While Enhancing Resilience program. The current program director is, Rebecca Stair.

=== Forestry Division ===
The Forestry Division was created in 1957. It is responsible for wildfire suppression on non-federal, non-municipal, non-tribal, and non-pueblo lands in New Mexico and provides technical advice on forest and resource management.

The division’s work includes wildfire response, hazardous-fuel reduction, forest and watershed restoration, invasive insect and disease management, rare plant conservation, urban and community forestry, and support for volunteer fire departments and private landowners. The Forestry Division describes its mission as retaining lead responsibility for wildland fire management on covered lands while promoting healthy, sustainable forests and watersheds. The current program director is, Laura McCarthey.

=== Mining and Minerals Division ===
The Mining and Minerals Division administers state programs related to hard-rock mining, coal mining, mine registration, mine safeguarding, mine safety, coal surface mine reclamation, and abandoned mine land reclamation.

The division’s programs include the Mining Act Reclamation Program, the Coal Mine Reclamation Program, the Abandoned Mine Land Program, and the Mine Registration, Reporting and Safeguarding Program. The Mining Act Reclamation Program was created under the New Mexico Mining Act of 1993 and regulates reclamation for hard-rock mining activities, subject to statutory exclusions. The Mine Registration, Reporting and Safeguarding Program registers mines, collects information on active mining operations, and publishes statistical information about the mineral industry in New Mexico. The current program director is, Gerard Schoeppner.

=== Oil Conservation Division ===
The Oil Conservation Division regulates oil and gas activity in New Mexico. Its responsibilities include collecting production data, permitting new wells, enforcing state oil and gas laws and division rules, issuing administrative orders, ensuring abandoned wells are properly plugged, and overseeing land restoration after oil and gas operations.

The division maintains public data systems and reports covering production, completions, violations, orders, transporters, flaring and venting, produced water, injection, inactive wells, and other oil and gas information.

The New Mexico Oil Conservation Commission was established by the New Mexico Oil and Gas Act of 1935. The commission consists of the Oil Conservation Division director, a designee of the Commissioner of Public Lands, and a designee of the EMNRD secretary. Although the commission has concurrent statutory authority with the division, its modern work focuses primarily on rulemaking and de novo review of orders entered by the division director. The current program director is, Albert Chang.

=== State Parks Division ===
The State Parks Division manages New Mexico’s state park system. As of 2026, New Mexico had 35 state parks. The division’s mission is to protect and enhance natural and cultural resources, provide recreational and educational facilities and opportunities, and promote public safety for visitors.

The State Parks Division also administers programs related to camping, boating, trails, outdoor education, outfitter trip ticketing, land and water conservation planning, park fees, and state park public meetings. The program director is, Toby Velasquez.

== Budget and performance ==
The New Mexico Legislative Finance Committee reported that EMNRD’s overall budget for fiscal year 2025 was $175.8 million, with federal funds comprising more than half of the department’s budget. The committee’s fiscal year 2025 performance reports noted federal funding uncertainty affecting multiple EMNRD programs, including the Oil Conservation Division’s orphan and abandoned well plugging program, the Forestry Division’s forest treatment work, and Energy Conservation and Management Division programs.

== Statutory Authority ==
The department is established and governed by the Energy, Minerals and Natural Resources Department Act, codified in Chapter 9, Article 5A of the New Mexico Statutes Annotated. The Act creates a cabinet-level department headed by a secretary appointed by the governor and confirmed by the New Mexico Senate.

The Act assigns responsibility for administration of New Mexico's energy, mineral, forestry, parks, and oil and gas programs and establishes six principal divisions: Administrative Services, Energy Conservation and Management, Forestry, Mining and Minerals, Oil Conservation, and State Parks.

The Act authorizes the secretary to appoint division directors, administer department resources, coordinate departmental policy, and exercise powers delegated by law to the department.

== See also ==
- Government of New Mexico
- Energy in New Mexico
