= Zimmerman Field =

Stadium in Albuquerque, New Mexico

Coordinates: 35.0837°N 106.6208°W

Zimmerman Field was a stadium located in Albuquerque, New Mexico. It opened in 1938 and hosted the University of New Mexico Lobos football team until they moved to University Stadium in 1960. The stadium continued in use for intramural sports until 1969, when it was demolished to make way for new academic facilities.

== History ==
The stadium held 16,000 people at its peak and was located on the central campus just south of Zimmerman Library, where Ortega Hall, the Humanities building and Woodward Hall currently stand. It featured a three-story Pueblo Revival-style grandstand designed by John Gaw Meem on the west side of the field, located where the CERIA building currently stands. The stadium was constructed using Public Works Administration funds on the site of University Field, which had been in use by the football team since 1892.

The stadium was variously known as University Stadium, Hilltop Stadium, and Lobo Stadium until November 1946 when the athletic field was renamed Zimmerman Field in honor of James F. Zimmerman, who was president of the university from 1927 to 1944.

The stadium was also briefly the first home of the University of New Mexico School of Law, which occupied four rooms of the second floor of the grandstand from 1947 to 1952, when it moved to the first Bratton Hall, now the Economics building next to the University House.
