= Ruth Hanna McCormick =

American politician, activist and publisher (1880–1944)

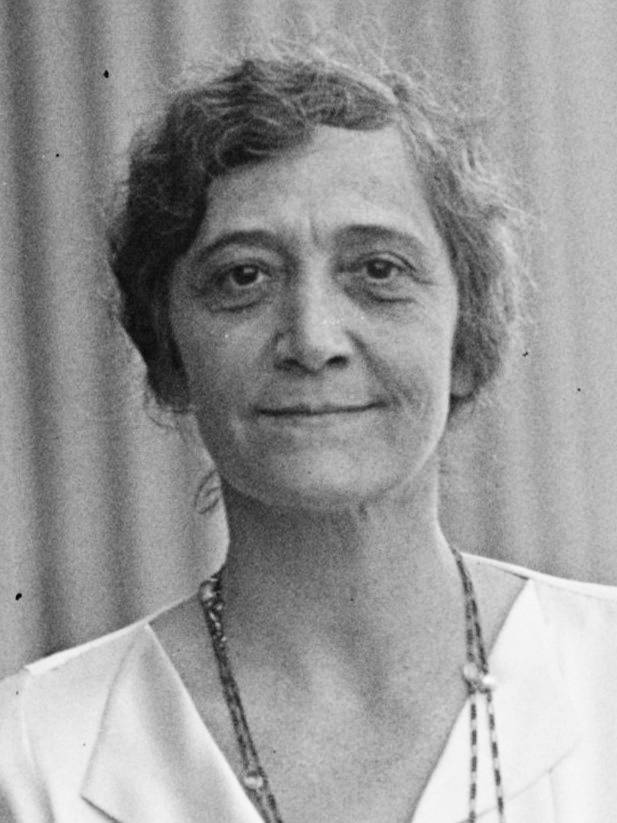
- McCormick in 1929

Member of the U.S. House of Representatives from Illinois's at-large district
- In office March 4, 1929 – March 4, 1931 Serving with Richard Yates Jr.
- Preceded by: Henry Riggs Rathbone
- Succeeded by: William H. Dieterich
- Constituency: Seat A

Personal details
- Born: Ruth Hanna; March 27, 1880 Cleveland, Ohio, U.S.
- Died: December 31, 1944 (aged 64) Chicago, Illinois, U.S.
- Party: Republican
- Other political affiliations: Progressive "Bull Moose" (1912)
- Spouses: Medill McCormick (m. 1903; died 1925) Albert G. Simms (m. 1932)
- Children: 3, including Bazy Tankersley
- Parent: Mark Hanna (father)

Ruth McCormick (née Hanna, also known as Ruth Hanna McCormick Simms; March 27, 1880 – December 31, 1944), was an American politician, activist, and publisher. She served one term in the United States House of Representatives, winning an at-large seat in Illinois in 1928. She gave up the chance to run for re-election to seek a United States Senate seat from Illinois. She defeated the incumbent, Senator Charles S. Deneen, in the Republican primary, becoming the first female Senate candidate for a major party. McCormick lost the general election. A decade later, she became the first woman to manage a presidential campaign, although her candidate, Thomas E. Dewey, failed to capture his party's nomination.

Politics were a part of McCormick's life from an early age. She was the daughter of Mark Hanna, a Senator and politician who was instrumental in the election of President William McKinley. McCormick learned politics by watching her father, and put those lessons to use fighting for causes such as women's suffrage and improved working conditions for women. McCormick was instrumental in passing a partial suffrage law in Illinois in 1913, allowing women to vote in municipal and Presidential elections. She also married two politicians, Senator Medill McCormick and, after Senator McCormick's death, Congressman Albert Gallatin Simms. McCormick had the fame, the background and the determination to build a career on the new opportunities for women in high level politics. As a spokesperson for the suffrage and for the Republican party, she made political activism attractive for partisan women.

McCormick's endeavors were not limited to politics. Throughout her life, she maintained an interest in agriculture. She owned and operated ranches in Illinois, New Mexico, and Colorado. She also owned several newspapers, founding the Rockford Consolidated Newspapers in Rockford, Illinois.

== Early life and family ==
Ruth Hanna was born on March 27, 1880, in Cleveland, Ohio. She was the third child of businessman and Republican politician Mark Hanna and Charlotte Augusta Hanna (née Rhodes). Her mother descended from a wealthy Vermont coal and iron family. She began riding ponies after her father gave her one as a gift when she was five years old. Instead of riding sidesaddle, as was common for girls at the time, Hanna rode astride the way boys did. She attended Hathaway Brown School in Cleveland, The Masters School in Dobbs Ferry, New York, and the Miss Porter's School in Farmington, Connecticut.

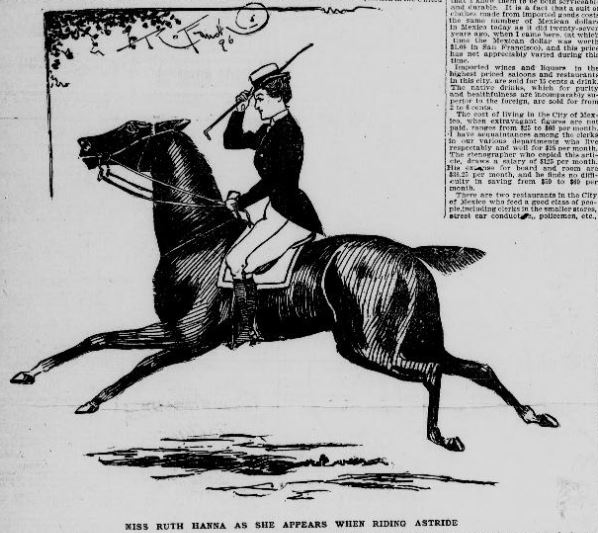
Drawing of Ruth Hanna published in 1896

Hanna's father was a close friend and political ally of Ohio Governor William McKinley, and she would often listen to the pair's political discussions. In 1896, Hanna traveled the country with her father, who was campaigning for then-presidential candidate McKinley while also running his own campaign for the United States Senate. Their stops included Dakota where Hanna stepped in to give a speech for her ill father, and Thomasville, Georgia, where she met her future husband Joseph "Medill" McCormick. Both McKinley and Hanna's father won their races, with Hanna's father earning the nickname "the President Maker".

By age 16, Hanna was an avid horseback rider and never wore dresses. She was said to have an independent spirit. A practical joke she played on the McKinleys, in which she pretended to have killed a wildcat on her own, led to reports that Hanna was an avid hunter.

After high school, Hanna went to Washington, D.C., to work as a secretary for her father who was serving as United States Senator from Ohio. Her duties included taking notes of events from the Senate Gallery. Her father hosted political breakfasts at their Washington, D.C. home where Hanna would socialize with political elites, including Presidents McKinley and Theodore Roosevelt. She was well known in the social circles of Cleveland, Washington, D.C., and Chicago. Although her family was wealthy, Hanna did not limit her friends based on her social station.

In 1902, Hanna became engaged to Medill McCormick. They were married on June 10, 1903, with President Roosevelt attending the wedding. Like Hanna, Medill was from a well-connected family. His grandfather, Joseph Medill, started the Chicago Tribune, which the family continued to own. Hanna and Medill had three children: Katrina (born 1913), John Medill (born 1916), and Ruth "Bazy" (born 1921).

== Early career ==
Ruth Hanna McCormick relocated to Chicago after marrying, where Medill briefly worked as publisher of the Chicago Tribune. McCormick began working at the paper as well. The McCormicks were a wealthy couple, and their wealth increased when, less than a year after their marriage, McCormick's father died, leaving her one of the primary beneficiaries of her father's $3 million estate (equivalent to $107,500,000 in 2025). In spite of their personal wealth, the couple lived at the University of Chicago Settlement, which introduced McCormick to many working women and helped her to understand the problems they faced. During their time living in Chicago, McCormick owned a dairy farm to provide untainted milk to locals, as part of the pure foods movement.

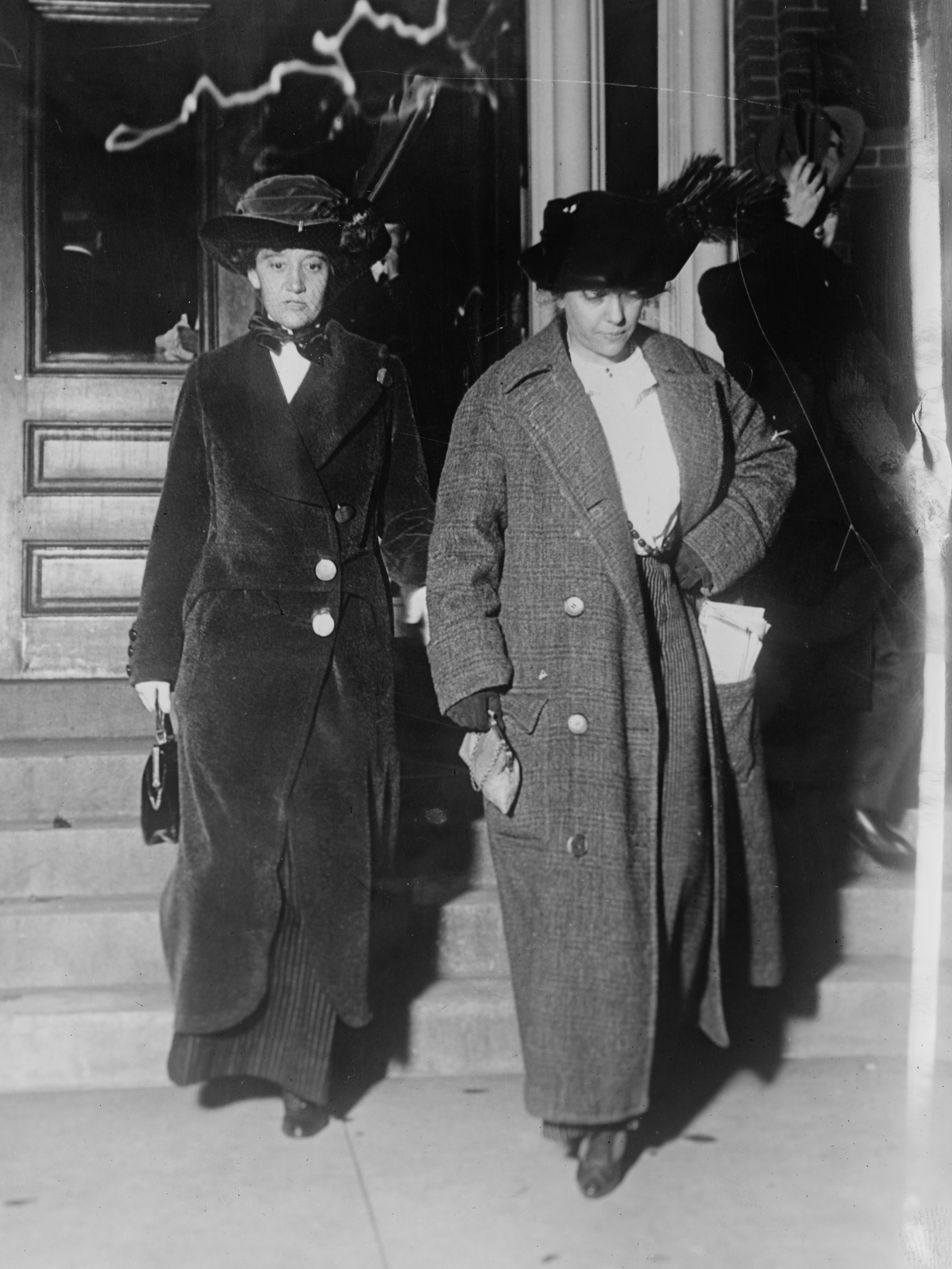
Ruth Hanna McCormick (left) and Alice Roosevelt Longworth leaving Mercy Hospital in 1912

By 1908, McCormick was a member of the Women's Welfare Committee, an organization for helping workers. She was also an active member of the Women's City Club of Chicago, a group that sought to convince lawmakers to pass legislation to help women, but found women's concerns were being pushed aside because they were not voters. This observation led to McCormick becoming a suffragist. In 1911, she and her husband lived in France and Great Britain where they studied European politics. Upon her return to the United States, McCormick joined the Progressive Party in 1912. She had long supported Progressive Party leader Theodore Roosevelt and found the switch to be consistent with the principles of her father, even though he had been a staunch Republican. Her husband also joined the Progressive Party, winning a seat in the Illinois General Assembly in that same year. McCormick served as chairman of the women's welfare section of the National Civil Federation.

=== Suffrage ===
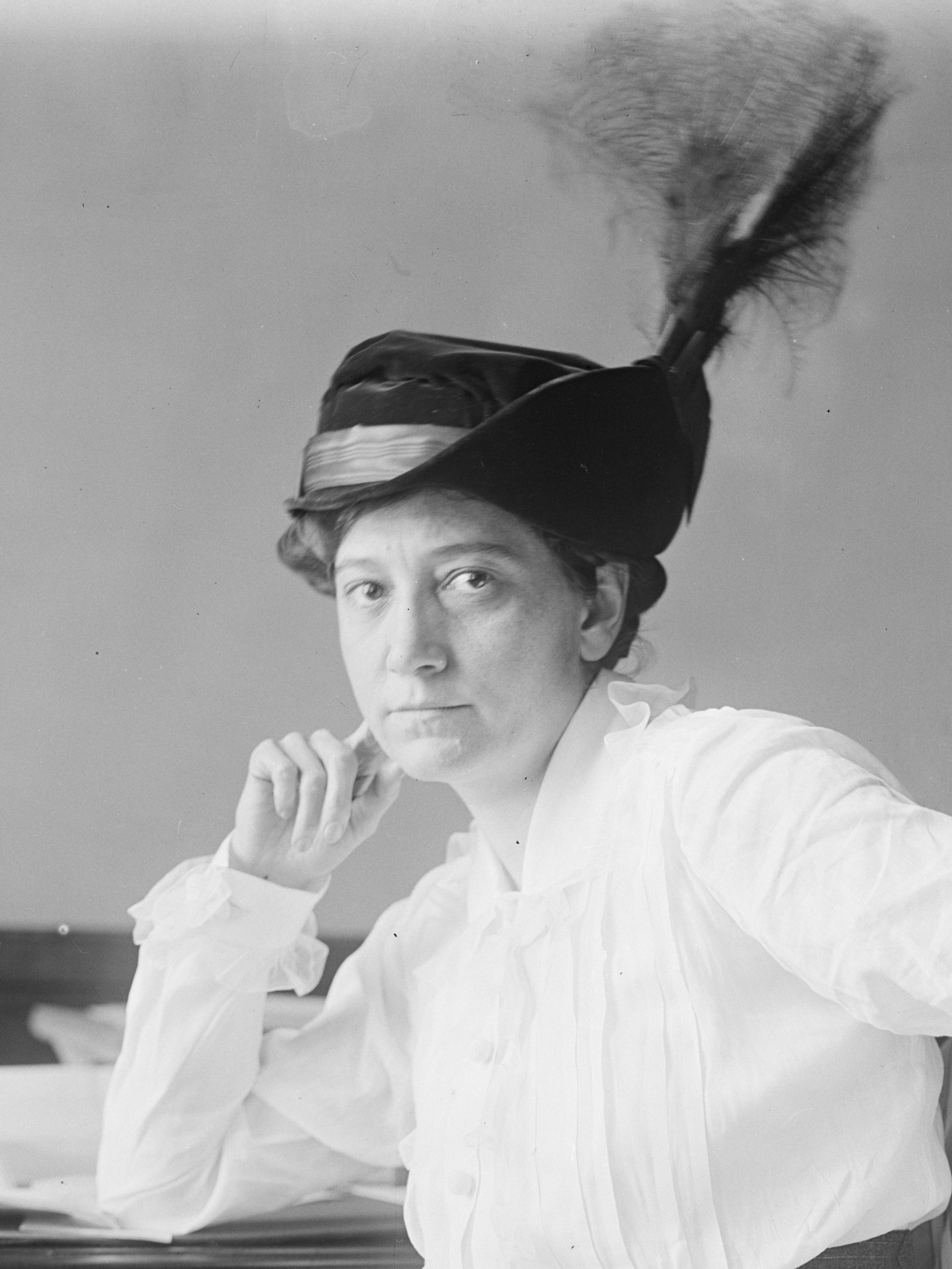
Ruth Hanna McCormick, 1914

McCormick worked closely with Grace Wilbur Trout to enact partial equal suffrage legislation in Illinois, which gave women the right to vote in municipal and presidential elections. (Note: The right to vote for governor and state legislature would have required an amendment to the state constitution and was not covered by the legislation.) Suffragists in Illinois pursued partial suffrage because full suffrage required a public referendum which activists believed they were likely to lose. Illinois had frequently passed such legislation through one house of the legislature before it ultimately stalled. McCormick adapted techniques she learned from her father to devise a campaign to pressure every member of the legislature. Trout, McCormick, and their associates met with every legislator and were present at the state capital every day of the 1913 legislative session until the measure passed both houses. Governor Edward F. Dunne signed the equal suffrage bill into law on June 26, 1913, gifting McCormick with one of the pens used in the signature. With the enactment of the law, over one million women gained the right to vote, doubling the number of women voters nationwide.

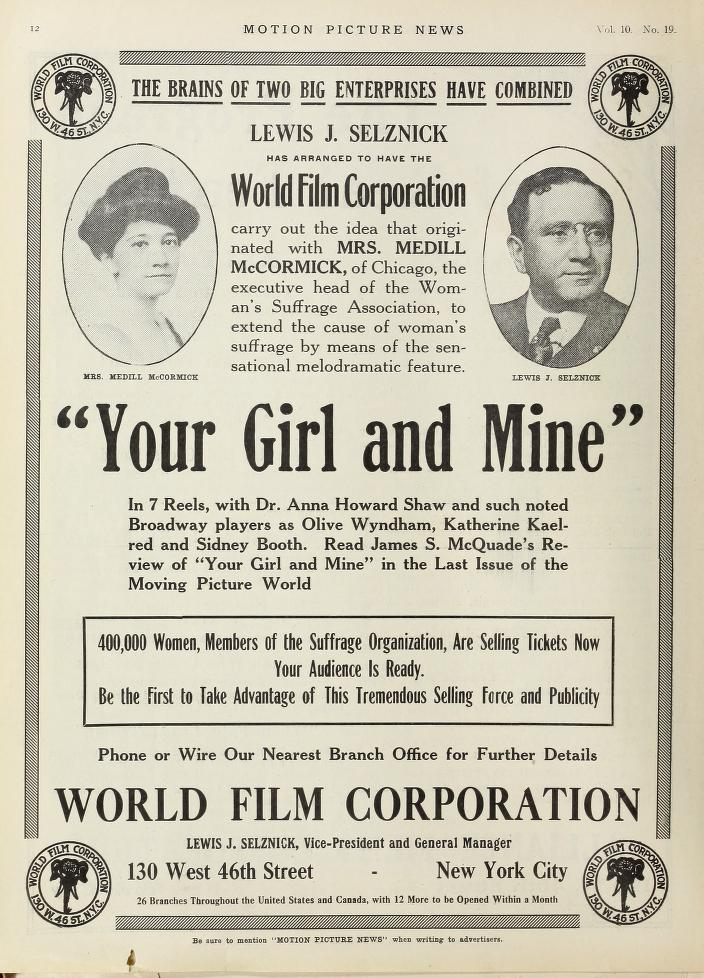
Your Girl and Mine film ad, 1914

McCormick remained an active worker for national suffrage until the Nineteenth Amendment was ratified. In 1913, she became chairman of the Congressional Committee for the National American Woman Suffrage Association (NAWSA). She took over leadership from Alice Paul, who went on to form the Congressional Union as a separate national suffrage organization. The new position had McCormick relocate from Illinois to Washington, D.C., where she promptly found a new headquarters for the Committee. From that headquarters, she was tasked with getting more pro-suffrage candidates elected to state level offices. During her time as leader of the Congressional Committee, McCormick and Lewis J. Selznick of the World Film Corporation produced the melodrama Your Girl and Mine, which was intended to help gain support for the suffrage movement. The film never circulated broadly, despite critical praise from contemporary film reviewers, because the distribution agreement between NAWSA and the World Film Corporation fell apart shortly after the premiere in 1914 and the film was confined to private screenings. That same year, McCormick showed solidarity with black activists. McCormick marched alongside Irene McCoy Gaines in a Washington, D.C. suffrage parade, one year after NAWSA had insisted black women march separately. As chair of the campaign committee, McCormick donated a gold elephant to be melted down and sold to help finance suffrage efforts in several states. The elephant had been a gift from members of the Republican National Committee (RNC) to thank McCormick for traveling the country as part of the McKinley campaign.

=== Return to Republican Party politics ===
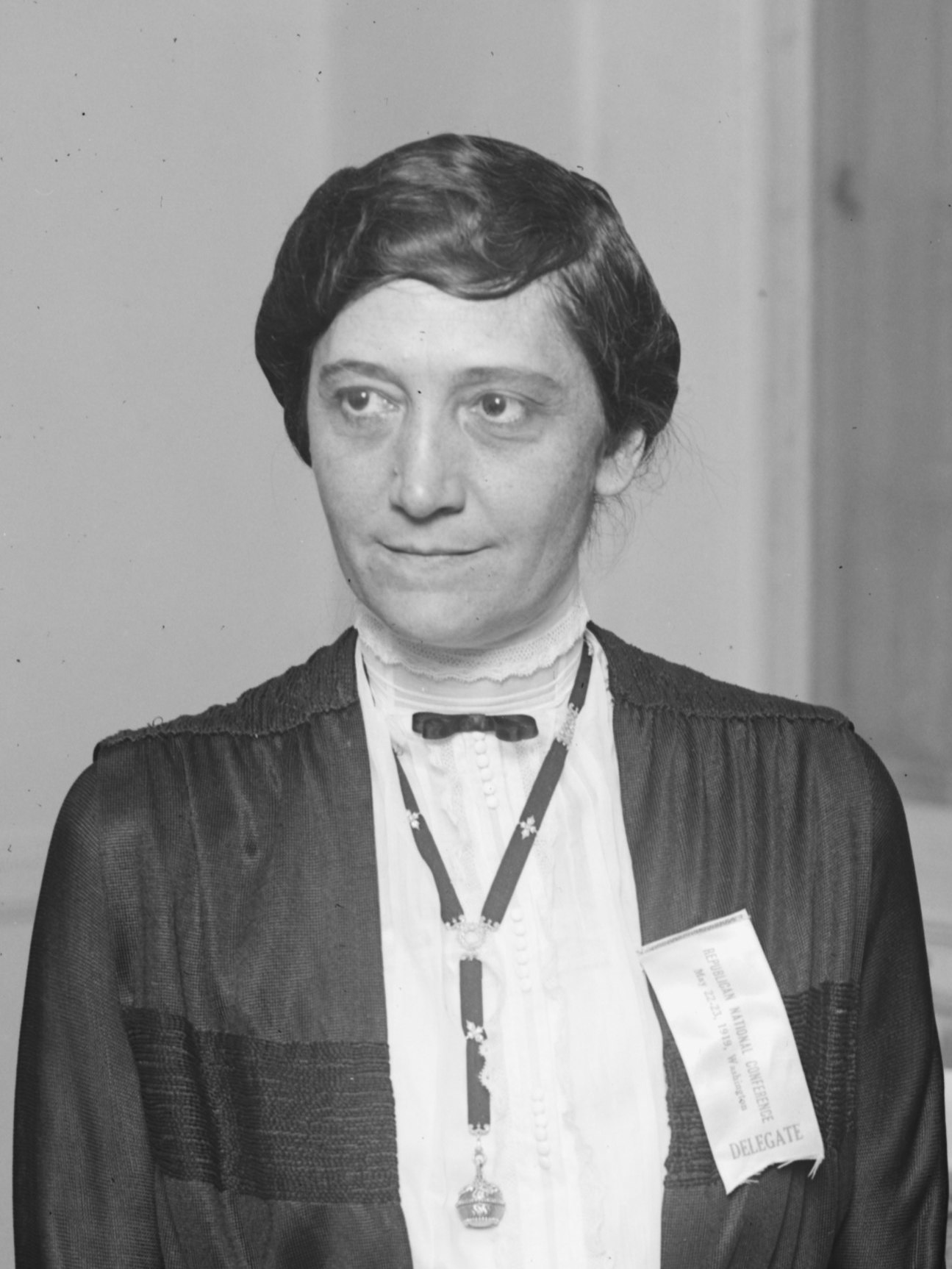
Ruth Hanna McCormick, Chairman, Republican Women's National Executive Committee at the Republican National Conference, May 22–23, 1919 in Washington, D. C.

Medill served one term in the United States House of Representatives before being elected to the United States Senate from Illinois in 1918. McCormick was highly involved in her husband's political career, and he often credited her for his success. In 1918, McCormick served as the chairman of the first woman's executive committee of the RNC. As chair, she devised a plan to get women to become active members of the Republican Party across the country. She resigned from the position after less than a year due to poor health. Next, McCormick became an associate member of the RNC, a position she held from 1919 to 1924. In 1924, she became the first elected national committeewoman from Illinois and served until 1928.

When not working on politics, McCormick managed her 1,500-acre farm in Illinois. The farm at Byron, Illinois, served as a model dairy, and it remained open as other similar farms closed for being unprofitable. McCormick and her children spent time at the farm during the summer months.

Medill lost the Republican primary in 1924 to Charles S. Deneen. Months later, on February 25, 1925, as he was preparing to leave office, Medill died. Although not publicized as such at the time, his death was considered a suicide. One of the factors leading to his suicide was his loss in the 1924 election. Medill had returned to Washington, D.C., days before his death, while McCormick stayed behind to spend time with her close friend of 30 years Alice Roosevelt Longworth after the birth of Longworth's first child. In her grief, McCormick considered giving up politics herself. At Longworth's urging, McCormick decided to continue.

Two months after Medill's passing, McCormick threw herself into working at the Woman's World's Fair as general executive and as a member of the event's Board of Directors. The goal of the event was to demonstrate the progress of women. As part of her responsibilities, McCormick recruited President Calvin Coolidge and First Lady Grace Coolidge to participate in the opening of the Fair.

== Congressional career ==
McCormick was convinced her husband had lost the primary due to the lack of engagement of Republican women voters. She turned her attention towards organizing Republican women, starting Republican Women's Clubs in 90 of Illinois's 102 counties. McCormick used that newly mobilized voting base when, in 1928, she ran in a heavily contested primary race for one of Illinois's at-large congressional seats. In the April 1928 primary election, she finished in first place in a field of eight candidates, including two sitting Congressmen, to win one of the two Republican nominations. In November 1928, McCormick won first place in the general election with 1,711,651 votes, elected along with the incumbent. Her vote total was a larger vote share than any other Republican on the ticket in Illinois, besides presidential nominee Herbert Hoover, and larger than any other member of the House of Representatives that year. McCormick was one of eight women elected to serve in the Seventy-first Congress, and one of three women elected for the first time. (Note: Coincidentally, the other two women elected to Congress for the first time were also named Ruth: Ruth Bryan Owen and Ruth Pratt.) By the time she entered Congress, McCormick had built a reputation as an astute politician for her years of working with her husband, and her ability to navigate the factions of Illinois politics.

Once in Congress, McCormick was appointed to the House Committee on Naval Affairs. She was the first woman to serve on the influential committee. Although she was not placed on the Agriculture Committee, despite her knowledge of farming, she pushed legislation to relieve farm overproduction. McCormick worked to ensure Oscar DePriest, elected to represent First Congressional District of Illinois, was seated over the objections of southerners who wanted to block the seating of an African-American. She supported a proposed amendment to the Census and Reapportionment Bill which aimed to enforce the 14th Amendment by counting disenfranchised individuals of voting age in the census. She also aided constituents who were veterans of the Spanish–American War who were having difficulty with their pensions.

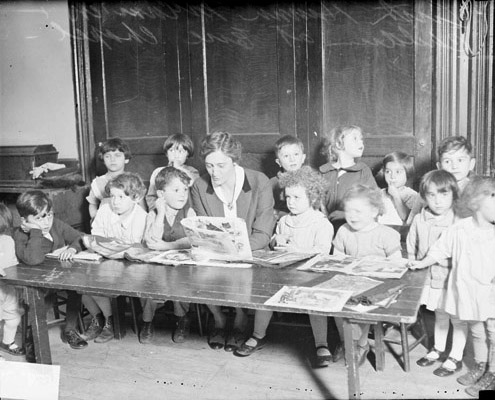
Ruth Hanna McCormick reading with children in 1929.

=== U.S. Senate campaign ===
In September 1929, McCormick announced her intention to run for the Senate against Republican incumbent Charles S. Deneen, who had won the seat from her husband in 1924. She sought the nomination at a time when no woman had ever been elected to the Senate. By October, McCormick had returned to Illinois, visiting the state's various counties to rally support while Deneen was stuck in Washington, D.C., on Senate business. As an Illinois farm owner, McCormick drew support from farmers in the state, particularly those down-state. McCormick also campaigned on her opposition to the World Court. She defeated Deneen in the 1930 Republican primary, 51% to 35%, to become the first female major party nominee for the Senate. The victory showed strong support for McCormick throughout the state, including a surprisingly strong showing in Chicago where she had gained the support of Mayor William Hale Thompson, who also had a rivalry with Deneen. McCormick later testified that the campaign cost $252,572 of her own money (equivalent to $4,867,797 in 2025), with additional funds being raised from relatives.

For the general election, McCormick was up against Democratic nominee former Senator J. Hamilton Lewis. Lewis previously lost the seat to Medill in 1918. William Thompson, who had supported McCormick in the primary, threw his support to Lewis in the general election. One contentious issue in the campaign was Prohibition, which McCormick supported and Lewis did not. However, some Prohibitionists thought that McCormick was insufficiently committed to prohibition, and several Prohibitionist figures defected to the "Independent Republican" campaign of Lottie Holman O'Neill. The high cost of McCormick's primary campaign also became a point for attack in the general election, with Lewis accusing McCormick of trying to buy the election. Lewis also made a point not to refer to McCormick by name, instead calling her "the lady candidate". McCormick refused to make her gender an issue, calling gender differences a personality issue and insisting political party mattered more in the general election. Unfortunately for McCormick, 1930 was a difficult year for Republican candidates as the stock market crash had occurred the year before. McCormick lost the election, 64% to 31%. Her term in office as a Congresswoman came to an end on March 3, 1931.

== Later life ==
In 1930, McCormick bought all three newspapers in Rockford, Illinois. She then formed Rockford Consolidated Newspapers as the publisher of the Rockford Register-Republic and the Rockford Morning Star. After leaving Congress, McCormick lived in Colorado Springs, Colorado. Her two youngest children attended school there while Katrina, the oldest, was enrolled in Columbia University. On March 9, 1932, she married politician Albert G. Simms of New Mexico, whom she met when they sat next to each other when they served together in Congress. Simms had lost reelection in 1930 and resided in Albuquerque.

After their marriage, McCormick and Simms moved to Los Poblanos, an 800-acre ranch in Albuquerque. McCormick hired John Gaw Meem to add to the existing ranch house on the property, and later to build the La Quinta Cultural Center which included a library, ballroom, art gallery, and swimming pool. Together, Simms and McCormick were one of the richest couples in New Mexico, and they used their fortune for several philanthropic endeavors. They founded Sandia School in 1932 (Note: The school later changed its name to Sandia Preparatory School.) and the Manzano Day School in 1938. McCormick was the second president of the Albuquerque Little Theatre.

McCormick remained active in Republican Party politics. She became the first woman to serve as chairperson of a convention delegation when she chaired the New Mexico delegation at the 1936 Republican National Convention. In 1937, she sold her dairy farm in Illinois and purchased a 250,000–acre cattle and sheep ranch in Colorado. In June 1938, her son, John Medill, went missing while mountain climbing with a friend in the Sandia Mountains. His body was found in the mountains after several days of searching. Not long after the loss, McCormick fractured her hip, limiting her activities.

Eight years after leaving office, McCormick announced her return to politics ahead of the 1940 presidential election. She once again threw herself into politics, co-managing Thomas Dewey's 1940 presidential campaign, becoming the first woman to take on such a role in a presidential campaign. While recovering from her fracture, McCormick had traveled to New York, where she convinced her cousin, New York Daily News editor Joseph Medill Patterson, to allow her to attend a dinner party where Dewey was a guest. McCormick and Dewey struck up a friendship, and she became an early and ardent supporter of his presidential campaign. With Dewey's loss in the primary, McCormick went on to support Republican presidential nominee Wendell Willkie.

Following the Dewey campaign's loss and the conversion of the Sandia Preparatory School into a military hospital, McCormick spent most of her time in Colorado, where she focused on the operation of her ranch. She tried to offer political advice to Dewey as he again sought the presidency in 1944, but he was wary of her isolationism.

== Death and legacy ==
In October 1944, McCormick fell off a horse, resulting in a shoulder injury. Shortly after she was discharged from the hospital, McCormick was diagnosed with pancreatitis. Her pancreas ruptured on December 4 and she died on December 31, 1944, in Chicago. She was buried in Albuquerque. In McCormick's honor, the Albuquerque City and County Commissioners, Albuquerque National Bank, and Manzano Day School all closed for her funeral.

After McCormick's death, Albert Simms donated over 12,000 acres of land to the Albuquerque Academy. In 1974, the school opened a fine-arts center named for Simms and McCormick. The Rockford Chamber of Commerce posthumously named McCormick to its Northern Illinois Business Hall of Fame.

== See also ==
- Women in the United States House of Representatives

== Sources ==
- Hasara, Karen. "McCormick unsung heroine in U.S. politics." Illinois Issues. XIX. 7 (July 1993): 28.
- Miller, Kristie. Ruth Hanna McCormick: A Life in Politics, 1880-1944. Albuquerque: University of New Mexico Press, 1992.
- Miller, Kristie. "Ruth Hanna McCormick and the Senatorial Election of 1930." Illinois Historical Journal, 81 (Autumn 1988): 191-210.
- Miller, Kristie. "McCormick, Ruth Hanna" American National Biography (1999)https://doi.org/10.1093/anb/9780198606697.article.0600604
- Miller, Kristie. Ruth Hanna McCormick: A Life in Politics 1880–1944 (1992), scholarly biography.

U.S. House of Representatives
Preceded by Henry Rathbone	Member of the U.S. House of Representatives from Illinois's at-large congressional district Seat A 1929–1931	Succeeded by William Dieterich
Party political offices
Preceded by Charles Deneen	Republican nominee for U.S. Senator from Illinois (Class 2); 1930	Succeeded by Otis Glenn
