= Scholes Hall =

- U.S. National Register of Historic Places
- NM State Register of Cultural Properties
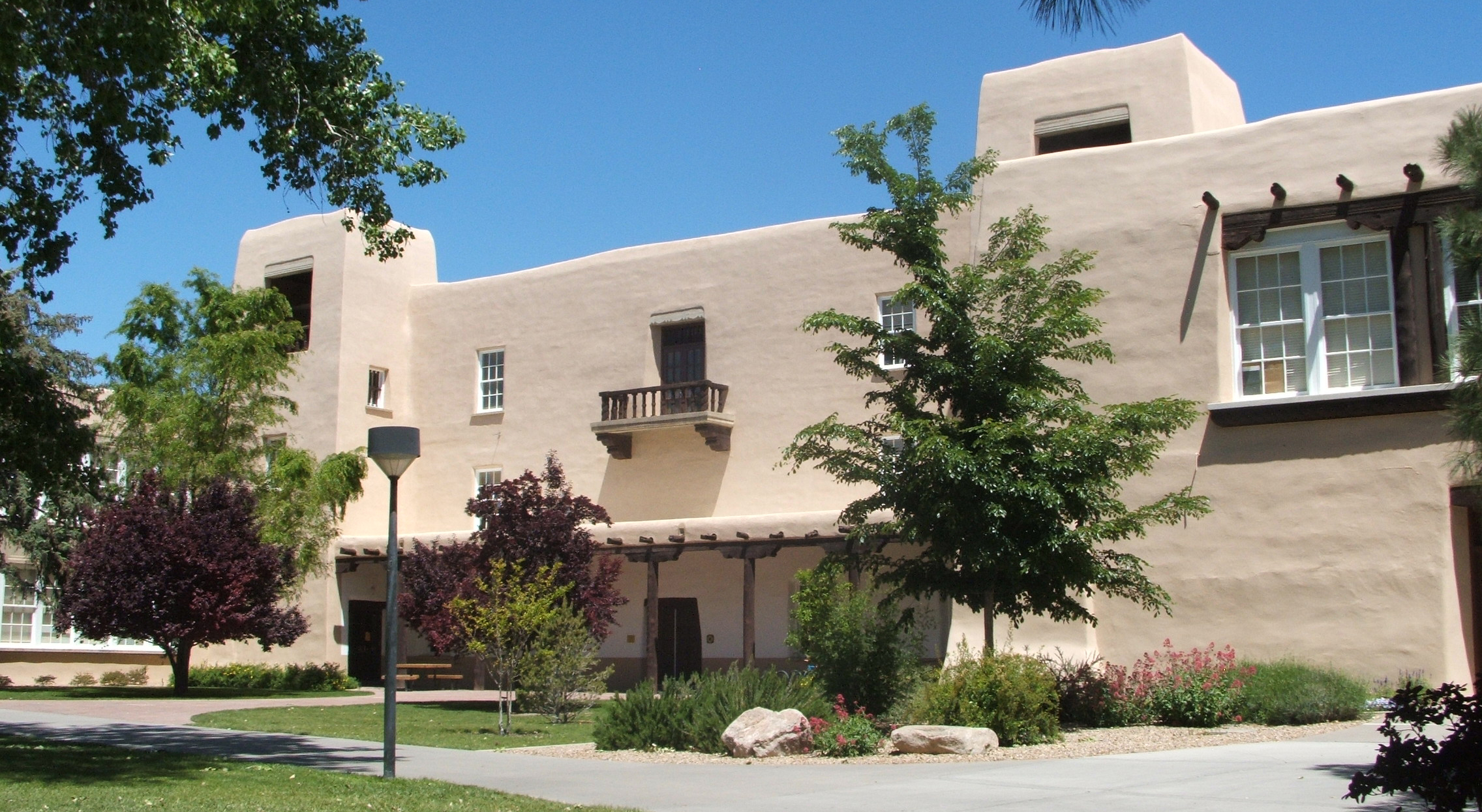
- Scholes Hall in 2010

- Location within New Mexico Location within the United States
- Location: University of New Mexico; Albuquerque, New Mexico
- Coordinates: 35°05′07″N 106°37′25″W
- Built: 1936
- Architect: John Gaw Meem
- Architectural style: Pueblo Revival
- NRHP reference No.: 88001545
- NMSRCP No.: 388

Significant dates
- Added to NRHP: September 22, 1988
- Designated NMSRCP: June 20, 1975

Scholes Hall is the historic administration building of the University of New Mexico, located on the main campus in Albuquerque. It was the first of many buildings designed for the university by Santa Fe architect John Gaw Meem, who helped to cement the Pueblo Revival style as the "official" architecture of the campus. Built in 1934–36 with Public Works Administration funding, it is regarded as one of Meem's most notable designs.

It is listed on the New Mexico State Register of Cultural Properties and the National Register of Historic Places,

It is named for France Vinton Scholes (1897–1979), who was an American scholar and historian noted for his research on the history of New Spain, especially Spanish Yucatan and Southwestern United States.

== History ==
Scholes Hall was the first of three major UNM buildings built in the 1930s under the direction of President James Fulton Zimmerman (1887–1944) and designed by Santa Fe architect John Gaw Meem. Meem had been introduced to Zimmerman by John J. Dempsey, a member of the Board of Regents who was a mutual acquaintance. The university had a pressing need for more space, and Meem was commissioned in 1933 to design a new administration building even though no funding was available. Much of the design work was already complete when the university finally secured a Public Works Administration grant to pay for the building in August 1934.

Meem's plans were approved in November 1934, and construction began the following month. Due to the tight budget, cheaper materials had to be substituted in some cases and ornamentation was kept to a minimum. The building was completed in January 1936 and cost $260,000. It originally housed classrooms, laboratories, and the Maxwell Museum of Anthropology as well as administrative offices, but was gradually converted entirely to office space during the 1950s and 60s. It still houses the university's main administrative offices.

In 1948, the ship's bell from the USS New Mexico was installed in one of the bell towers. It was moved to its own freestanding tower near Smith Plaza in 1964.

Scholes Hall was listed on the New Mexico State Register of Cultural Properties in 1975 and the National Register of Historic Places in 1988.

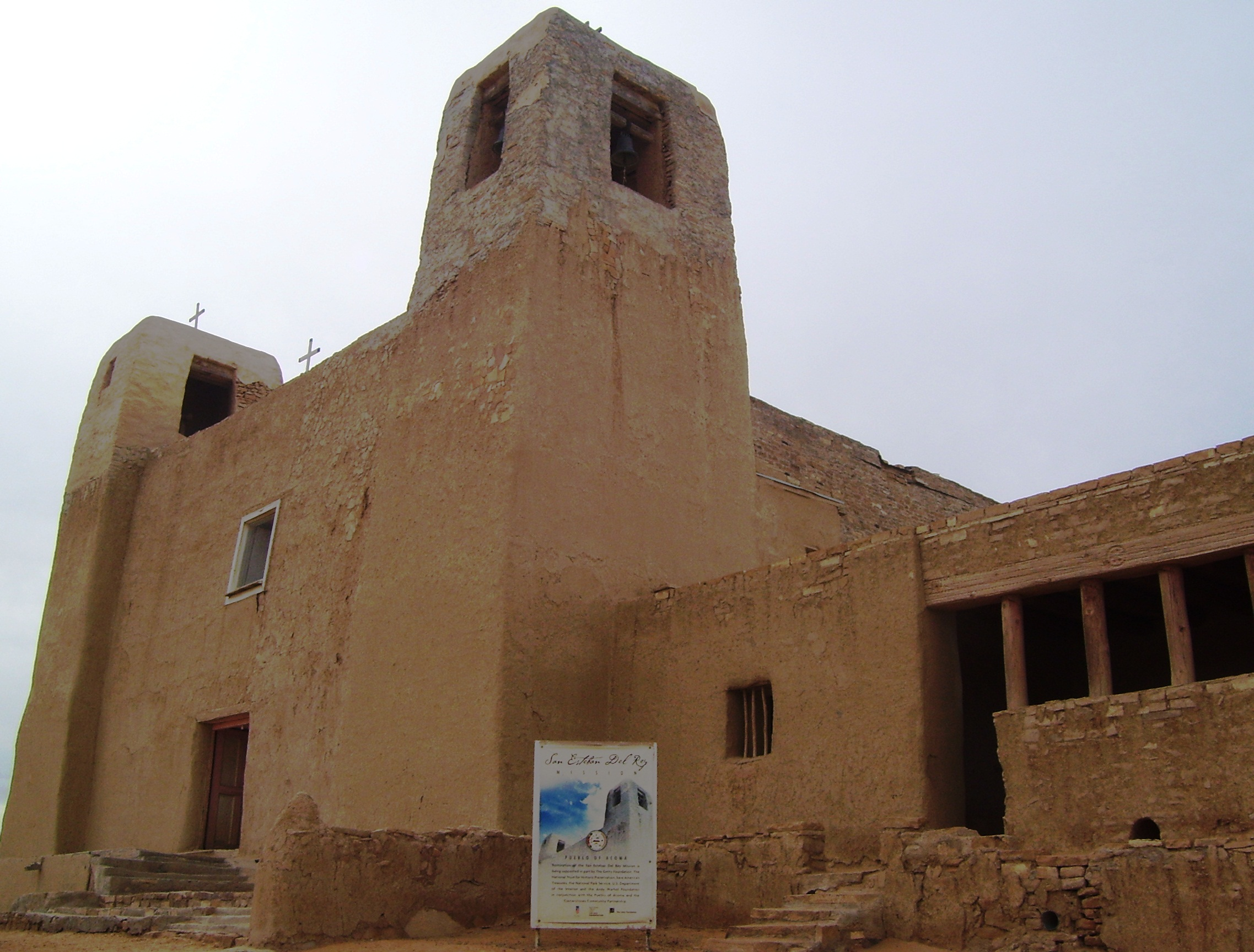
San Estevan Del Rey Church (1692) was a source of inspiration for Scholes Hall

== Architecture ==
Scholes Hall is an example of the Pueblo Revival style for which Meem was best known, drawing inspiration from New Mexico's traditional adobe architecture with stepped massing, battered walls and parapets, and projecting vigas. In particular, Meem's design was modeled after the 1692 San Estevan Del Rey Mission Church at Acoma Pueblo. The building is H-shaped, with a symmetrical, three-story central block, bell towers, and asymmetrical two-story wings. The walls are brick and structural clay tile stuccoed to look like adobe. The central block has a portal or portico with wooden columns, corbels, and vigas, symmetrical groupings of 6-over-6 sash windows, and a third-floor balcony with wooden corbels and railings. The wings have faux vigas and precast concrete spandrels decorated with Art Deco Native American designs on the east and west sides, and doorways with carved wooden ornamentation on the north and south sides.

The building originally served as a terminating vista for Terrace Street, which ended in a circular driveway at the intersection with Ash Street. When the campus was closed to vehicular traffic in the 1970s, the streets were replaced with a grassy landscape called Ash Mall.
