= Los Poblanos Historic Inn & Organic Farm =

- Los Poblanos Historic District
- U.S. National Register of Historic Places
- U.S. Historic district
- NM State Register of Cultural Properties
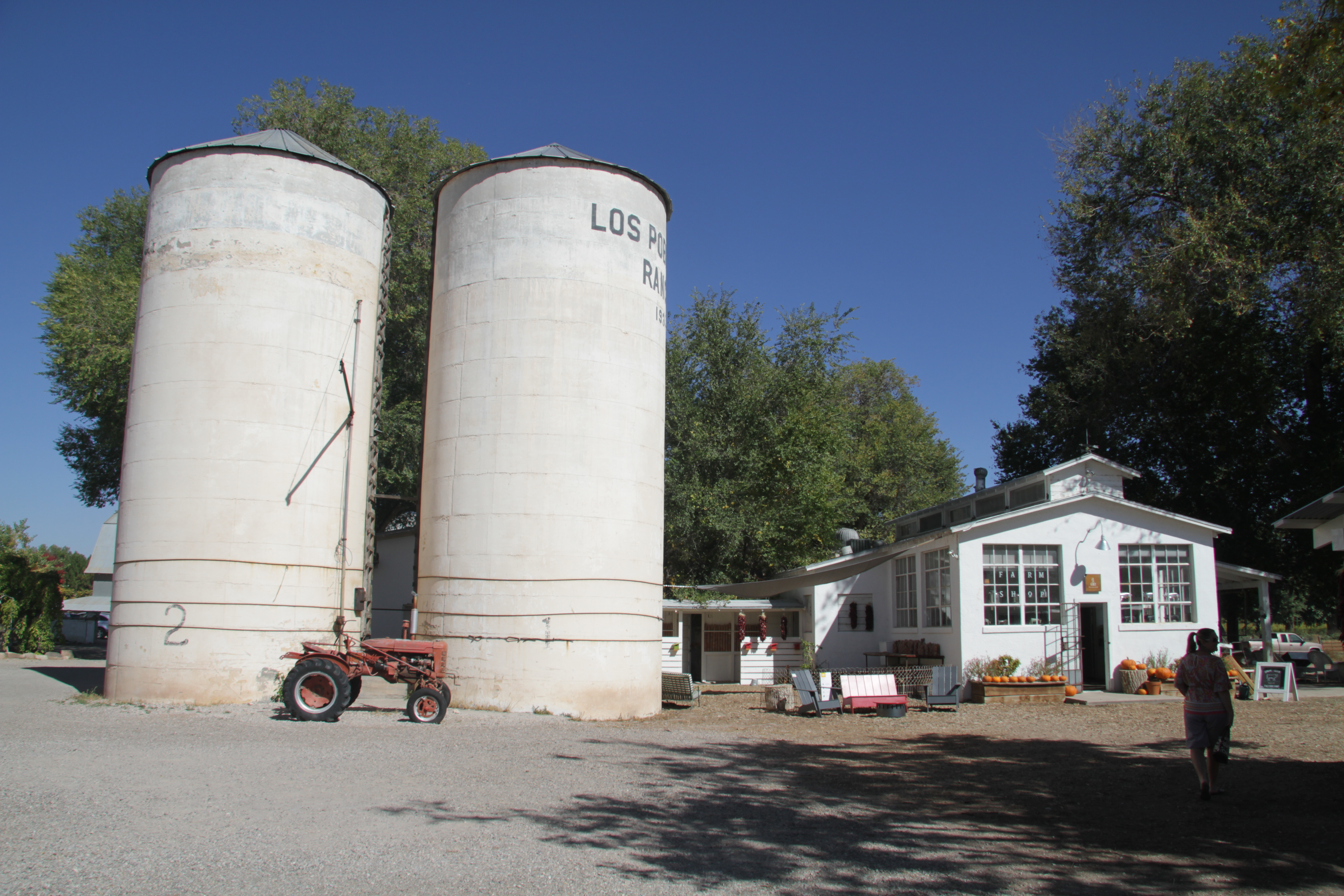

- Location within New Mexico
- Location: Los Ranchos de Albuquerque, New Mexico
- Coordinates: 35°08′54″N 106°40′04″W
- Architect: John Gaw Meem
- NRHP reference No.: 82003321
- Added to NRHP: May 27, 1982

Los Poblanos Historic Inn & Organic Farm is a farm with a ranch house and inn that was established in the 1920s just north of Albuquerque, New Mexico,

== History ==
Congressman Albert G. Simms married Congresswoman Ruth Hannah McCormick Simms in 1932, and the couple began construction of the Los Poblanos ranch shortly thereafter. The building was designed by John Gaw Meem in the Pueblo Revival Style of architecture. Located on 800 acres, the property was the family's private home, dairy, farm, nursery and cultural center. Numerous WPA artists and craftsmen also contributed to Los Poblanos to renovate the ranch house and create the Cultural Center.

Rose Greely designed the gardens to the east with a view of the Sandia Mountains and west with a view of the Rio Grande. Greely's design emphasized native plant material in connection with the house to create a quite retreat-like atmosphere as the visitor travels a road with pines to enter through a brightly tiled and inviting courtyard with a bubbling fountain.

La Quinta Cultural Center was commissioned in 1934 as a guest house, but the Simms planned to use it as home base for Ruth's political fundraisers, recitals and parties with its ballroom, tin chandeliers, and carved wood ceilings as well as a museum to showcase her collection of Western art. Los Poblanos was an experimental farm, significant in the establishment of the dairy industry in New Mexico with their purebred herds of Guernsey and Holstein cattle which became Creamland Dairies. The also experimented with sugar beets, alfalfa, oats, corn and barley.

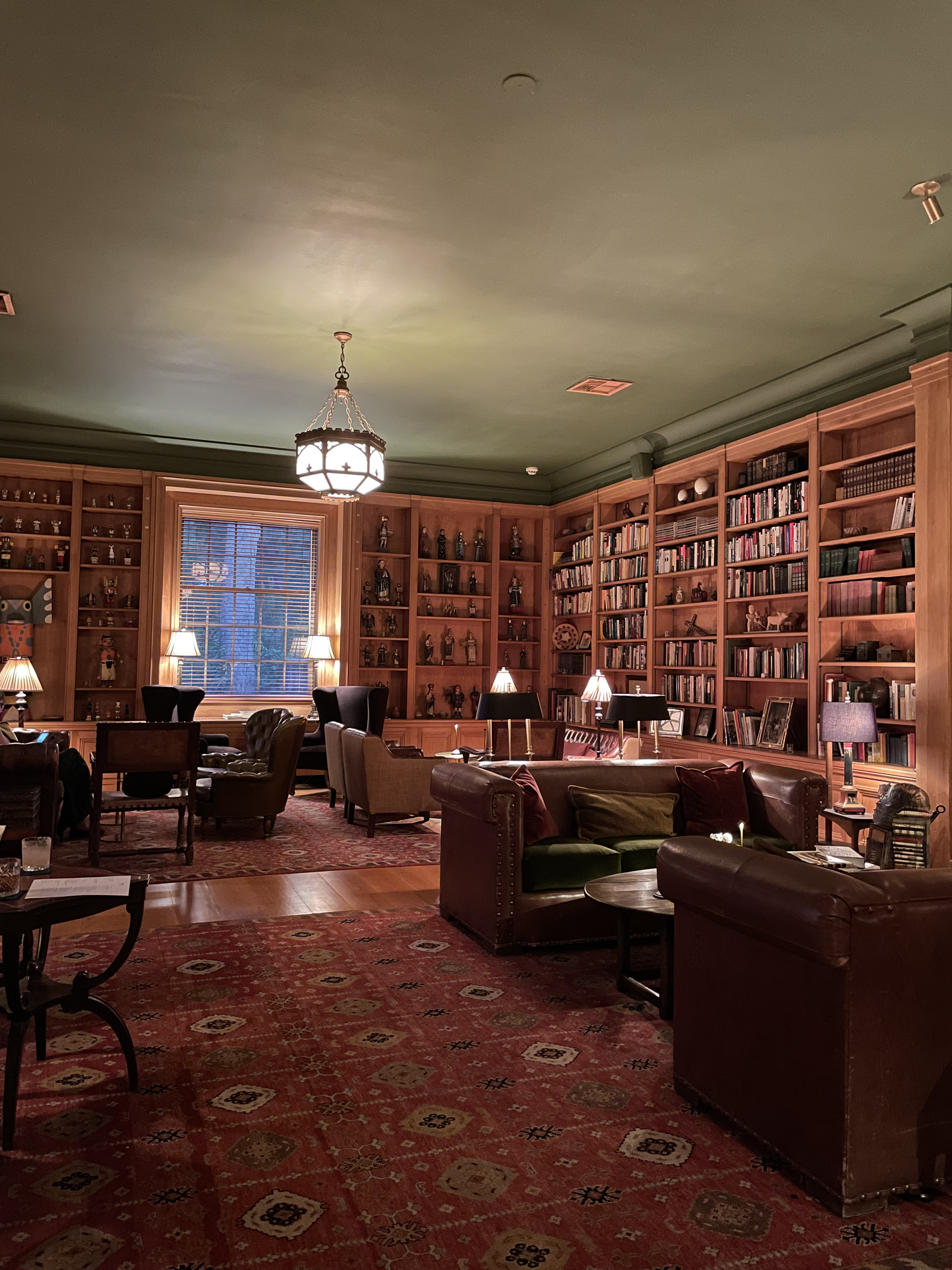

In 1944, Ruth died, followed by Albert in 1964. In 1999, Armin and Penny Rembe purchased the property. The Rembes turned the family home into a bed and breakfast, restaurant, farm and hosts a variety of cultural activities.

Los Poblanos is listed on the New Mexico State Register of Cultural Properties and The National Register of Historic Places. In 2013, it received the Trustees Emeritus Award for Excellence in the Stewardship of Historic Sites by The National Trust for Historic Preservation.
