= Maisel's Indian Trading Post =

- U.S. National Register of Historic Places
- NM State Register of Cultural Properties
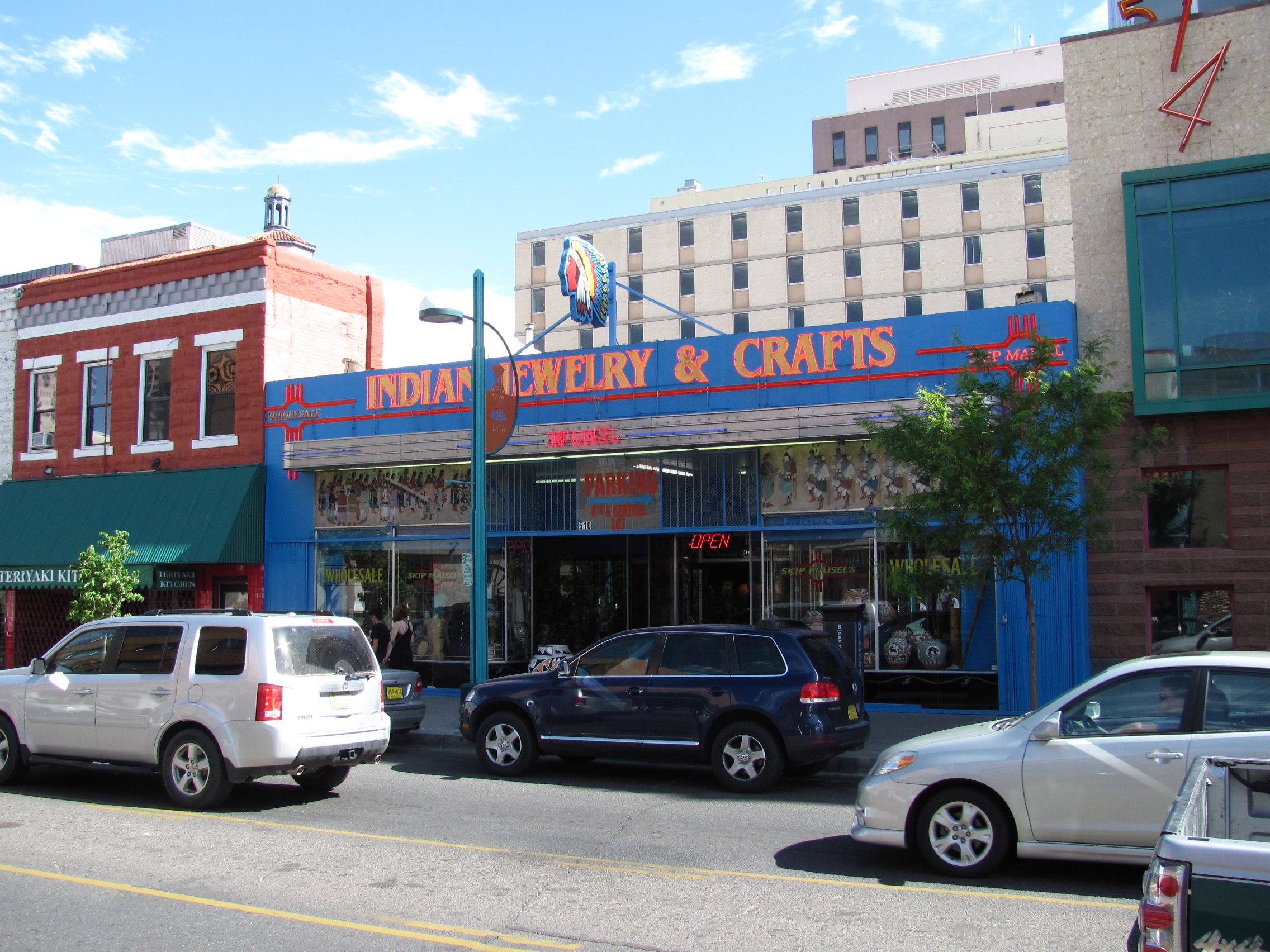
- Maisel's Indian Trading Post in Albuquerque

- Location within New Mexico Location within the United States
- Location: 510 Central Ave., SW; Albuquerque, New Mexico
- Coordinates: 35°5′4″N 106°39′10″W
- Built: 1939
- Architect: John Gaw Meem
- Architectural style: Pueblo Deco
- NRHP reference No.: 93001215
- NMSRCP No.: 1565

Significant dates
- Added to NRHP: November 22, 1993
- Designated NMSRCP: September 17, 1993

Maisel's Indian Trading Post was located in the city of Albuquerque, county of Bernalillo, in the U.S. state of New Mexico. It was added to the New Mexico State Register of Cultural Properties and the National Register of Historic Places listings in Bernalillo County, New Mexico in 1993. Maisel's was closed permanently in August, 2019 when owner Skip Maisel retired before the pandemic occurred.

== Store ==
Established by Maurice and Cyma Maisel in 1939 to cater to the new U.S. Route 66 tourist trade, this Pueblo Deco building was designed by architect John Gaw Meem. The building features murals designed by Olive Rush. Various murals depicting Indian life were painted by ten Pueblo and Navajo artists such as Narcisco Abeyta, Harrison Begay, and Awa Tsireh. The trading post employed hundreds of native craftspeople in its heyday. It closed upon its founder's death, only to be reopened in the 1980s by Maurice's grandson, Skip. It continued to trade as Skip Maisel's Indian Jewelry and Crafts, until summer of 2019, when Skip Maisel retired and closed the business.

The store was featured in 2017-aired Better Call Saul season 3, episode 6 , Off Brand, (at 39 min. 50 sec.), as background to Chuck McGill telephoning his therapist, Dr. Cruz.
