= James Fulton Zimmerman =

American historian and professor

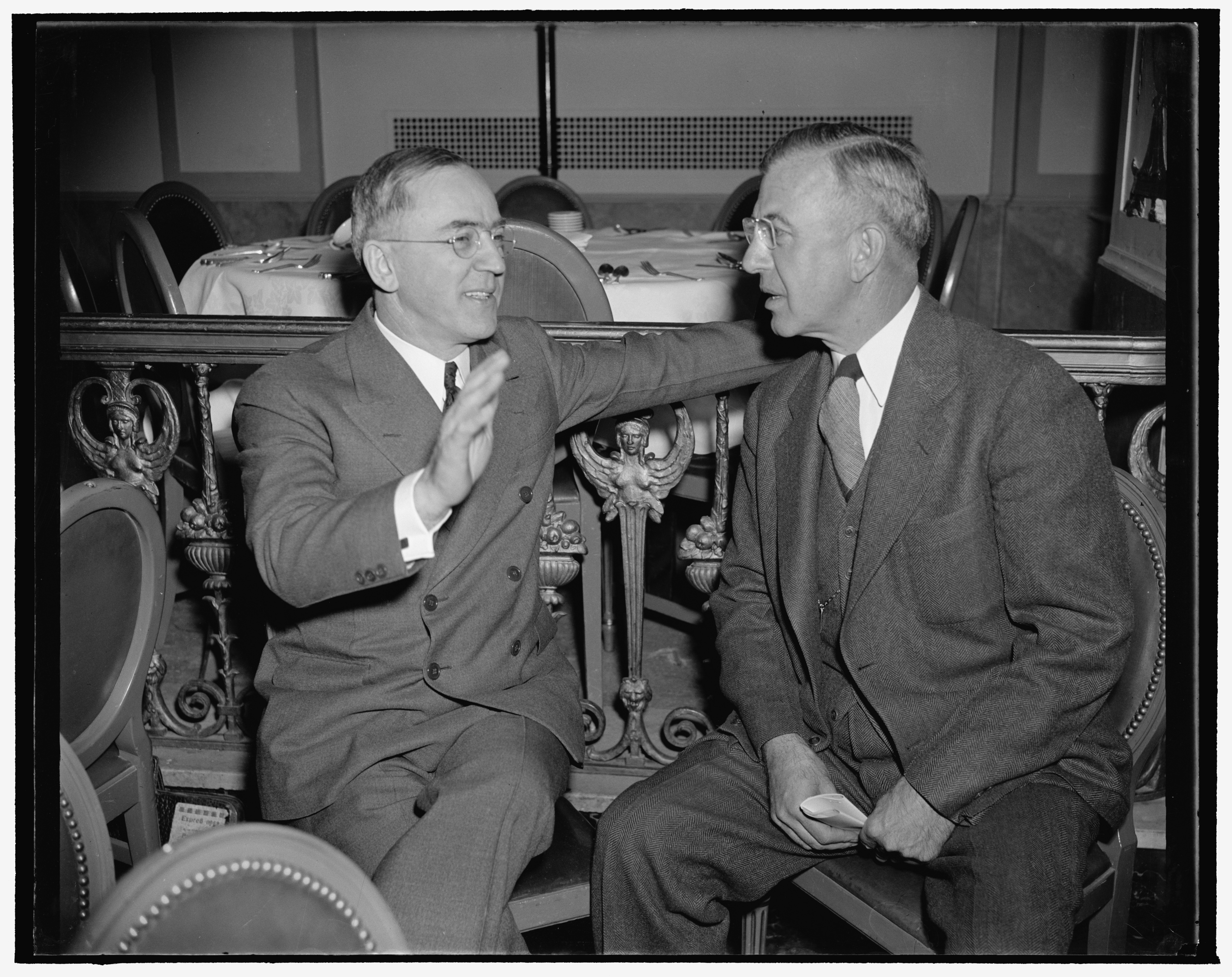
- John Studebaker (L) talking to James Zimmerman (R)
- Born: September 11, 1887; Glen Allen, Missouri
- Died: October 20, 1944 (aged 57)
- Occupations: Historian, professor
- Spouse: Willa Adella Tucker (m. 1913)

Academic background
- Education: Vanderbilt University; Columbia University
- Thesis: Impressment of American Seamen (1925)

Academic work
- Discipline: Political science
- Sub-discipline: Impressment of American sailors
- Institutions: University of New Mexico

James Fulton Zimmerman (September 11, 1887 – October 20, 1944) was an American historian and professor of political science. He was the seventh president of University of New Mexico and played a central role in its development and expansion. He is known in the academic historical world for his research into the subject of American seamen "impressed" into the Royal Navy by the British before and during the War of 1812. He also played an important role in the founding of the New Mexico Coronado Cuarto Centennial Commission, of which he served as its first president.

== Early life and education ==
Zimmerman was born in Glen Allen, Missouri, on September 11, 1887. In 1913, he was awarded an M.A. degree. That year he also married Willa Adella Tucker, who went by her middle name Adella. Zimmerman received a bachelor's and a master's degree from Vanderbilt University in Nashville, Tennessee. What appealed to Zimmerman the most was education at the university level.

Zimmerman undertook his own studies to increase his chances of obtaining a faculty position. He enrolled in the doctoral program in history and political science at Columbia University in 1919 and received his Ph.D. in 1925 with a dissertation titled "Impressment of American Seamen", which was published later that year by Columbia University Press.

Upon graduation Zimmerman was offered teaching positions from Ohio State University and the University of New Mexico. Zimmerman chose New Mexico and moved to Albuquerque with his wife, Adella, in 1925.

== Career ==
Zimmerman was a professor of political science. Two years later he became the university's president on June 4, 1928, and held that position until 1944, when his executive assistant, Tom Popejoy, assumed that position. The first postgraduate studies in the southwest were a direct result of his efforts to continue the direction and work of the university's former presidents while never losing focus on academics.

Well known for his management style, Zimmerman's inauguration to the presidency was formally celebrated and was attended by New Mexico Governor Richard C. Dillon along with public school officials from across the state. Also in attendance was the president of Stanford University, Ray Lyman, who was the main guest speaker, who six months later became Secretary of the Interior in the cabinet of President Herbert Hoover. The first postgraduate studies in that geographical era were a direct result of his efforts to continue the direction and work of his predecessors, while never losing focus on academics.

As a historian, Zimmerman researched British impressment of American seamen during the War of 1812. His work covers three periods of failed diplomatic negotiation between the United States and Great Britain over the British assertion of the right to impress American seamen into the British Royal Navy, which is often referred to by historians in that area of study. Zimmerman explained the effect of the practice of massive and prolonged British impressment on Anglo-American relations during the administrations of Presidents John Adams and Thomas Jefferson. He was the first historian to study U.S. State Department records on impressment. His estimate of the numbers of Americans impressed is considered conservative, at 10,000. (Note: Historians who have accepted Zimmerman's estimate include Denver Brunsman, "Subjects vs. Citizens", 572; Alan Taylor, Civil War of 1812, 105; Donald Hickey, Don't Give Up the Ship: Myths of the War of 1812 (Urbana, Il: University of Illinois Press, 2004), 18–22.) His work reviews the legal and diplomatic debates surrounding the Royal Navy's impressment of American citizens since the War of 1812.

When the New Mexico Coronado Cuarto Centennial Commission was established in 1935, Zimmerman was elected its president. He joined Edgar Hewett, a longtime friend in a commemoration that lasted a year, which included the creation of Coronado State Monument at the ruins of Kuaua Pueblo, near Bernalillo. In 1940 Zimmerman published The Coronado Cuarto Centennial, in The Hispanic American Historical Review.

Zimmerman died October 20, 1944, at the age of 57 from a second heart attack after struggling with coronary thrombosis.

Zimmerman Field and Zimmerman Library at the University of New Mexico were named for him.

== See also ==
- Scholes Hall

== Sources ==
- Davis, William Eugene (2006). Miracle on the Mesa: A History of the University of New Mexico, 1889–2003. University of New Mexico Press. ISBN 9780826340160.
- Davis, William E. (2006). "James Fulton Zimmerman, Biography". University of New Mexico.
- Orr, Gwen (2020). "James Fulton Zimmerman". University of New Mexico.
- Wolf, Joshua J. (2015). "The Misfortune to get Pressed": The Impressment of American Seaman and the Ramifications of the United States, 1793–1812 (PDF) (PhD). University of Virginia Press.
- Flint, Richard; Flint, Shirley Cushing. "James Fulton Zimmerman". New Mexico State Records Center and Archives.
- Zimmerman, James Fulton (1925). Impressment of American Seamen. Columbia University.
- Zimmerman, James Fulton (February 1940). "The Coronado Cuarto Centennial". The Hispanic American Historical Review. 20 (1). Duke University Press: 158–162. doi:10.1215/00182168-20.1.158. JSTOR 2507507.
