= Carlos Vierra =

American painter

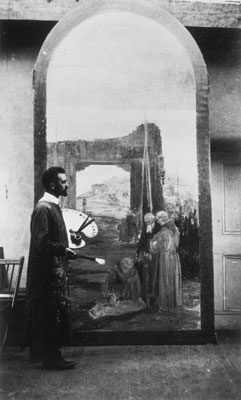
- Born: October 3, 1876; Moss Landing, California
- Died: December 19, 1937 (aged 61); Santa Fe, New Mexico
- Resting place: Fairview Cemetery (Santa Fe, New Mexico)
- Education: Mark Hopkins Institute of Art, San Francisco, California
- Known for: Painter, Illustrator, photographer
- Patrons: Frank Springer

Carlos Vierra (October 3, 1876 – 1937) was an American painter, illustrator and photographer of Portuguese descent.

== Early life ==
Carlos Vierra was born and raised in Moss Landing, California near Monterey by his father, Portuguese sailor, Cato Vierra and his mother, Maria de Fratas. Vierra went to school in Monterey, California and had a hard time deciding between a life at sea and art. He studied art at the Mark Hopkins Institute (now the San Francisco Art Institute) under Gottardo Piazzoni in the 1890s, until he was twenty-five. Wanting to further his studies, Vierra took a six-month trip around Cape Horn to New York City. Once there, he worked hard to become an illustrator, a growing artistic field. In time, his art began to comfortably sustain him, though only for a short time. In 1904, at age twenty-eight, Vierra contracted tuberculosis and, at the advice of his doctor, relocated to Santa Fe, New Mexico. Vierra decided to live in a remote, small cabin along the Pecos River. When his health was not improved, he was forced to get help from the Sanitarium.

== New Mexico ==
Vierra was Santa Fe's first non-Indigenous resident artist and was one of the first three "members" of the Santa Fe Art Colony. He was a strong advocate for preserving landmark buildings and for making sure that new buildings were in the style that is so unique to Santa Fe. That style is now known as the Pueblo Revival Style architecture. It was at the Sunmount Sanatarium, a restorative institution for tubercular consumption, where Vierra met architect John Gaw Meem and others who influenced each other and made sure the Pueblo Revival style of Santa Fe was preserved. The first houses in 1925 and 1926 that John Gaw Meem designed show a clear debt to his mentor, Carlos Vierra. In 1909, the School of American Archaeology's director, Edgar Lee Hewett appointed Vierra to manage the building of the New Mexico Museum of Art (formerly the Museum of Fine Arts). Hewett also allowed him to have an influential role in restoring the Palace of the Governors, the oldest capitol building in the United States. Additionally, he painted three murals in the St. Francis Auditorium. In 1914, Frank Springer commissioned Vierra to paint each of the pueblo mission churches. These and other paintings would show both Spanish and Pueblo traditional New Mexico architecture. In 1918, after he wrote, "'See Santa Fe First.' There is a reason [to do so] in our rare climate, in our wonderful surroundings and in what is left of historic Santa Fe. Are we going to destroy what is left…or are we going to build in keeping with it?" Vierra began construction on a Pueblo revival style home for his family on Old Santa Fe Trail. The home was funded by Frank Springer, who was a patron of the arts.

== Other achievements ==
Vierra was commissioned and executed Six murals of Mayan cities for the 1915 Panama–California Exposition in San Diego. The 35mm reproductions of his murals can be seen on an interior wall of the Museum of Man, Balboa Park, San Diego. In addition to his illustrating and painting, Vierra opened his own photography studio on the west side of the Santa Fe Plaza, which he purchased for $280 from J.B. Aylsworth on November 27, 1905. In the 1920s he became involved in aerial photography and documented archeological sites from the sky. Vierra was also a captain in the New Mexico National Guard.

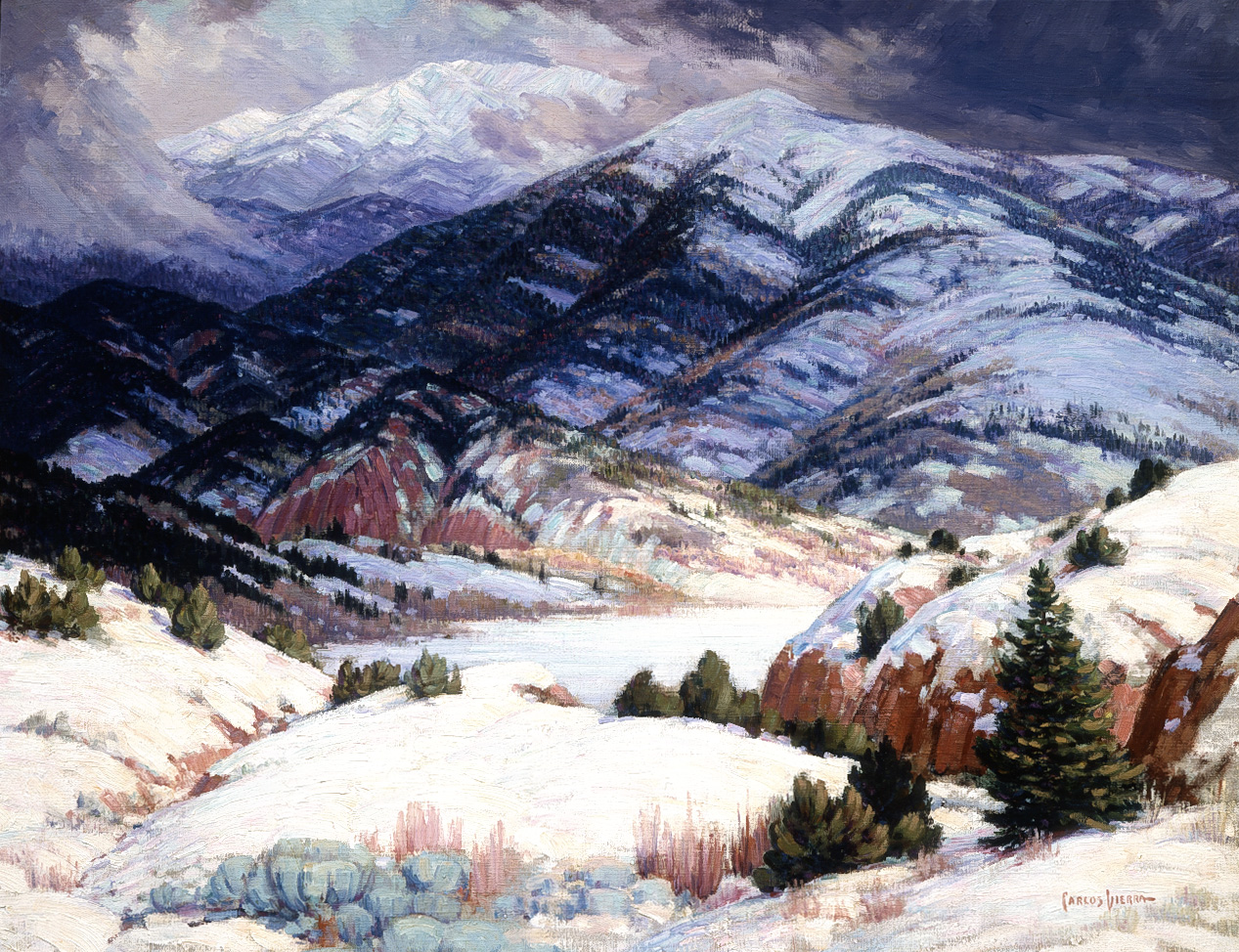
Northern New Mexico in Winter by Carlos Vierra, 1922

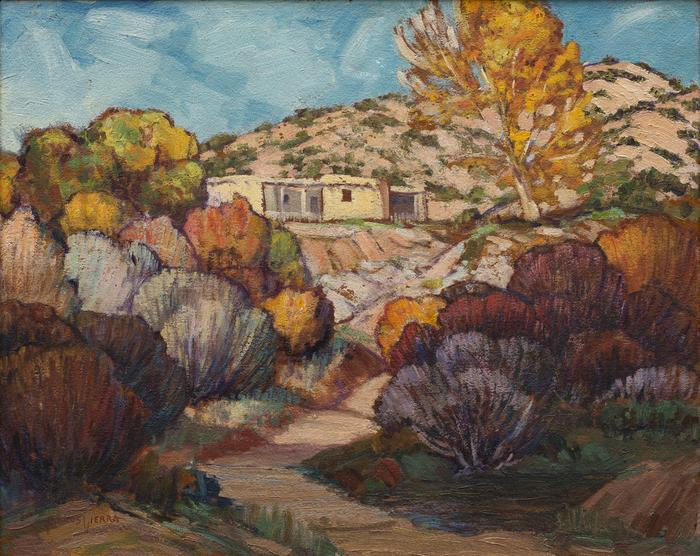
Cerro Gorgo, Santa Fe by Carlos Vierra, c. 1920
