= Zimmerman Library =

Historic building in New Mexico, United States

- U.S. National Register of Historic Places
- NM State Register of Cultural Properties
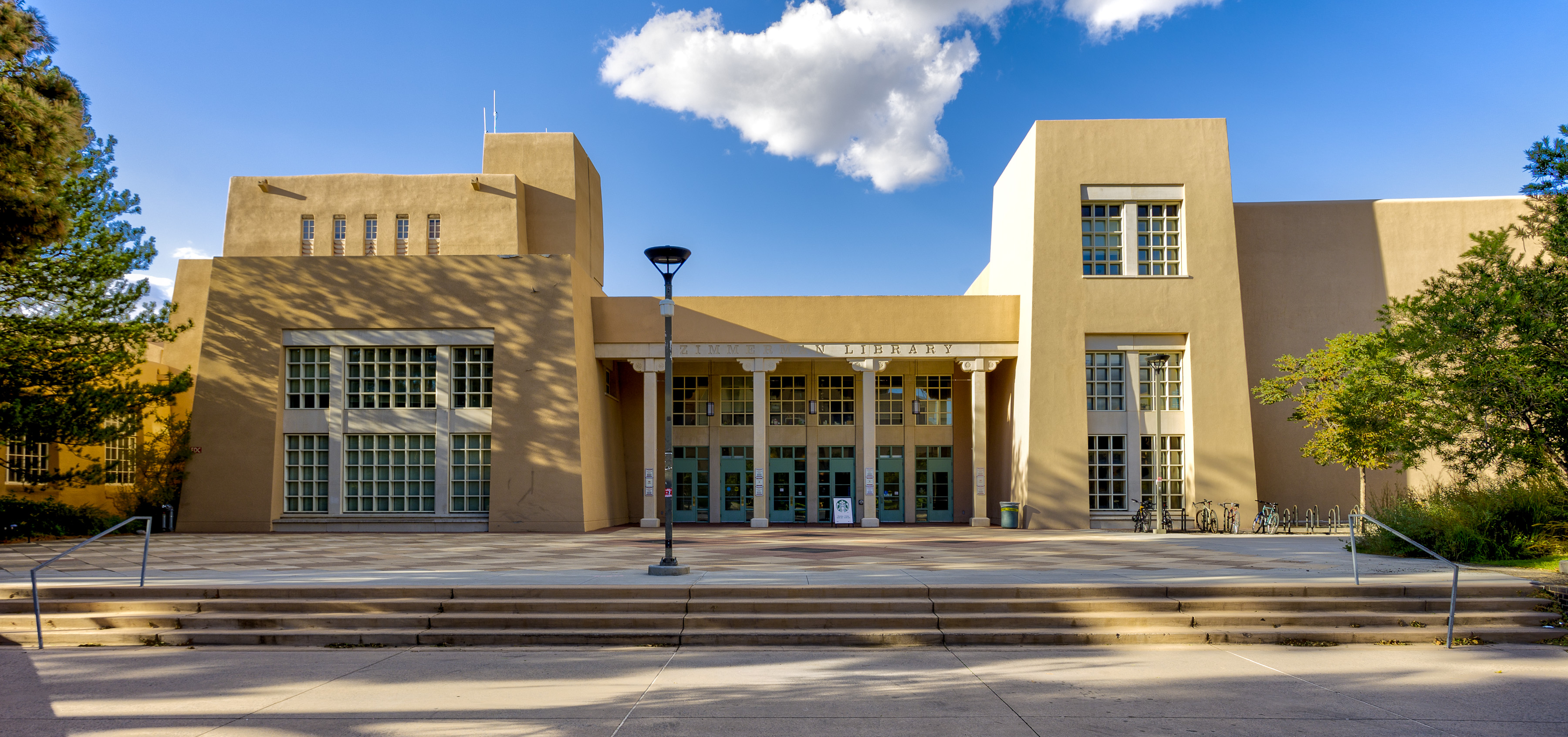
- Zimmerman Library, 2024

- Location within New Mexico Location within the United States
- Location: 1900 Roma Ave. NE, Albuquerque, New Mexico
- Coordinates: 35°5′9″N 106°37′17″W
- Built: 1936–38
- Architect: John Gaw Meem
- Architectural style: Pueblo Revival
- NRHP reference No.: 16000549
- NMSRCP No.: 2026

Significant dates
- Added to NRHP: August 22, 2016
- Designated NMSRCP: June 10, 2016

Zimmerman Library is the historic main library of the University of New Mexico, located near the center of the university campus in Albuquerque, New Mexico. It is one of the largest and most notable buildings designed by New Mexico architect John Gaw Meem and is the centerpiece of the UNM Libraries, the largest library system in New Mexico with almost 4 million print volumes. It was built in 1936–38 with funding from the Public Works Administration and Works Progress Administration, with further additions completed in 1966 and 1973. The building was named for former university president James Fulton Zimmerman in 1961. It was added to the New Mexico State Register of Cultural Properties and the National Register of Historic Places in 2016.

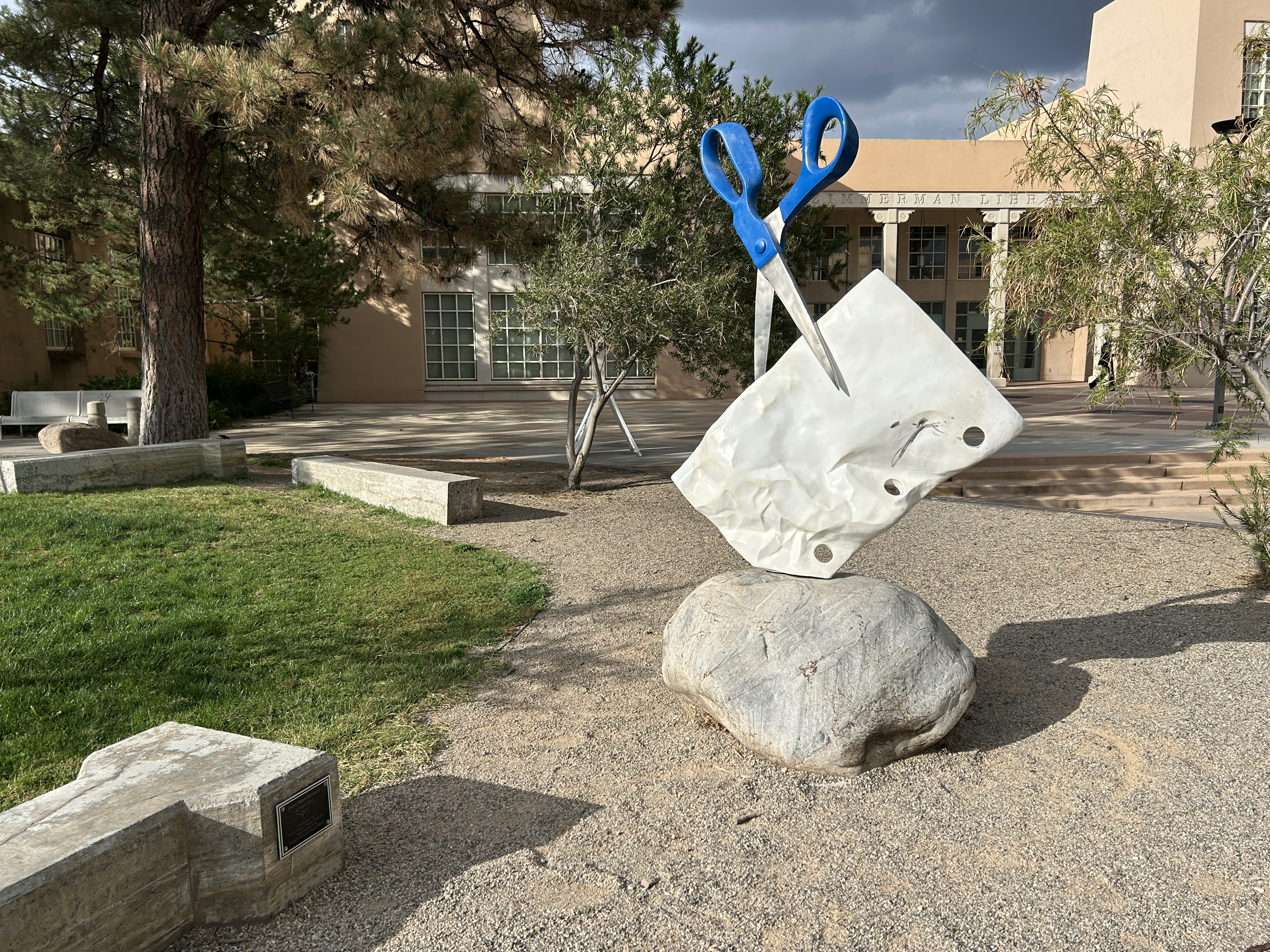
"Stone Paper Scissors" by Kevin Box, outside the library

The library is a nine-story, Pueblo Revival style building constructed from reinforced concrete, brick, and structural clay tile. The original 1938 section of the library consists of a great hall, five reading rooms, and the central nine-story stack tower, which was designed to hold 225,000 volumes. The interior trim and furnishings were handmade by local artisans employed by the WPA, including hand-carved corbels, vigas, and heating register covers, wrought-iron banisters, door handles, and gates, and punched-tin light fixtures. Four murals in the great hall were created by Kenneth Miller Adams. To the east of the original section are two additions, completed in 1966 and 1973 respectively, which brought the total size of the library to approximately 224,000 square feet (20,800 m^{2}).

== Zimmerman Library Fire ==
On April 30, 2006, a fire in the basement of the building triggered the fire alarms and alerted staff and patrons to evacuate the building quickly. Although the Albuquerque Fire Department arrived within minutes, the fire destroyed 30,000 bound periodicals and melted light fixtures and shelves. The incident caused smoke damage throughout the entire library, and the efforts in putting out the fire caused even more damage to the materials, prompting the removal of water-damaged materials beyond repair. Investigators on the scene suspected arson as the cause and confirmed that an accelerant was used to start the fire.

In the days following the disaster, the University Libraries (UL) staff relied on their emergency plans and developed protocols with the intent to recover as much of the material as possible. Because of the damage from the fire, the basement at Zimmerman Library was promptly redesigned to be more patron-friendly and incorporate more study areas. The remodel also included the installation of fire suppression sprinklers, which Zimmerman did not have when the disaster occurred.
