= John Gaw Meem =

American architect

- Born: November 17, 1894; Pelotas, Brazil
- Died: August 4, 1983 (aged 88); Phoenix, Arizona, U.S.
- Education: Virginia Military Institute (BS, 1914)
- Occupation: Architect
- Spouse: Faith Bemis (m. 1933)

John Gaw Meem IV (November 17, 1894 – August 4, 1983) was an American architect based in Santa Fe, New Mexico. He is best known for his instrumental role in the development and popularization of the Pueblo Revival Style and as a proponent of architectural Regionalism in the face of international modernism. Meem is regarded as one of the most important and influential architects to have worked in New Mexico.

== Biography ==
=== Early life ===
Meem was born in 1894 in Pelotas, Brazil, the eldest child of parents who were missionaries of the Episcopal Church. In 1910 he traveled to the United States to attend Virginia Military Institute, where he obtained a degree in civil engineering. After graduating, he worked briefly for his uncle's engineering firm in New York before being called up for military service. Having spent the duration of World War I at a training camp in Iowa, Meem was hired by the National City Bank of New York and sent to Rio de Janeiro.

=== Architectural career ===
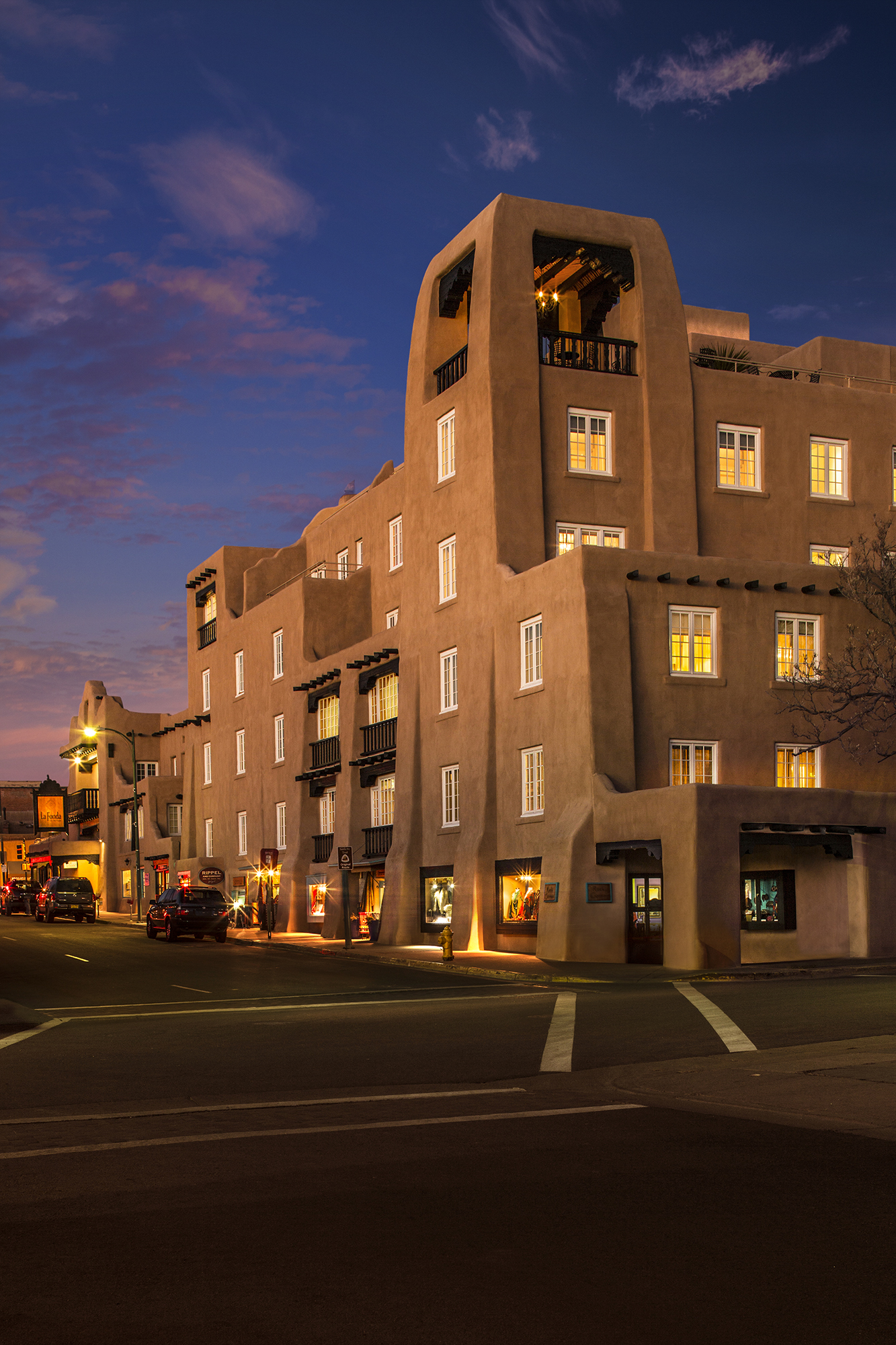
La Fonda hotel, Santa Fe, expansion and remodel

Soon after arriving in Brazil he was diagnosed with tuberculosis. Like many other tuberculosis patients of his time, Meem decided to seek the cure in the dry desert climate of New Mexico. He arrived at the Sunmount Sanatorium in Santa Fe in the spring of 1920. While at Sunmount, Meem gradually developed an interest in architecture. His initial curiosity was fueled by members of the nascent art community that was studying and preserving the adobe buildings of not only the ancient inhabitants of pueblos but also the Spanish missionaries in New Mexico. In particular he gravitated to the painter Carlos Vierra, who was a fellow patient at Sunmount. Both men found inspiration in the landscape and buildings of the old southwest. Meem also developed an interest in the preservation of historic buildings, a pursuit that would occupy him throughout his career.

In 1922, having recovered sufficiently to spend time away from the sanatorium, he spent fifteen months working for the firm of Fisher & Fisher in Denver. In the evenings he attended the Atelier Denver, a studio affiliated with the Beaux-Arts Institute of Design in New York. This constituted Meem's only formal training in architecture. Informally, Meem studied the Spanish churches and missions and was inspired by their simple forms. He would later write about creating an "old new architecture" that combined modern planning with adobe forms.

Upon Meem's return to Sunmount in 1924, he and fellow patient Cassius McCormick opened their own architecture practice, using one of the sanatorium's spare buildings as a studio. Meem handled the design work, while McCormick managed the business side of the enterprise. Their first commission was the renovation and expansion of a house belonging to Hubert Galt, yet another fellow patient. Another of his earliest commissions was the home of Tex Austin at the Forked Lightning Ranch. The home is now part of the Pecos National Historic Park. More significant were his houses for Cyrus McCormick, Jr. and Amelia Hollenbeck. Both incorporated traditional adobe construction techniques and domestic typologies, later becoming models for dozens of "Santa Fe style" residences in the area.

McCormick returned to his home state of Indiana in 1928, dissolving the partnership. Meem's most significant work during this period was his remodeling of the La Fonda Hotel in Santa Fe, which called upon him to respect the vernacular forms of the original while updating the building for contemporary uses. He proved adept at this balancing of preservation with new design, leading to other work with old buildings in the area. Meem was head of the Historic American Buildings Survey in New Mexico from 1934 until 1955.

Between 1928 and the beginning of World War II, Meem's office remained small, employing only a handful of drafters, though his reputation was growing. In 1930, he entered and won a national competition to select a design for the Laboratory of Anthropology in Santa Fe. Among his competitors was the firm of Fisher & Fisher, where he had been apprenticed just a few years earlier. Then in 1933, he was selected as the official architect of the University of New Mexico in Albuquerque, a position he would hold until his retirement. His best-known work at the University was the iconic Zimmerman Library, completed in 1938. Later that year, Meem achieved international recognition for the monumental Colorado Springs Fine Arts Center, which is generally regarded as his masterpiece. It was while working on this project that he met his wife Faith, whom he married in 1933.

The war kept Meem's firm occupied with a large number of military and government commissions, and his staff at one point reached 35 employees. Hugo Zehner, who had been with Meem since 1930, was promoted to partner in 1940. Another partner, Edward O. Holien, joined in 1944, making the firm Meem, Zehner, Holien and Associates. During this period Holien became the firm's primary designer, with Meem mainly handling public relations work. The post-war years were the firm's most productive period, with a number of buildings designed for the University of New Mexico, Santa Fe Public Schools, Southern Union Gas Company, and many other clients.

=== Retirement ===
Following a gradual transfer of power to Holien, Meem retired in 1956. He remained associated with the successor firm of Holien and Buckley, serving as an architectural consultant. Meem continued to accept scattered commissions through the 1960s, and in later life published occasional articles in architecture journals. He was a benefactor and supporter of Santa Fe Preparatory School, where a campus building is named for him. He died in 1983 at the age of 89.

== A Regional Architecture for the Southwest ==
Meem was one of the first architects to be associated with the Regionalism that would increasingly influence American painting, literature and architecture during the 1920s and 1930s. He gained an extensive knowledge of Pueblo and Spanish Colonial building techniques through his volunteer work with the Committee for the Preservation and Restoration of New Mexico Mission Churches (CPRNMMC) during the 1920s and 1930s. Unlike many previous eclectic architects, however, Meem used architectural forms such as battered walls, vigas, and stepped parapets in combination with modern building techniques and materials to evoke the past without imitating it directly. He explained in a 1966 article that he used symbolic forms to "evoke a mood without attempting to produce an archaeological imitation."

Meem's finest works all found resonance with the soft, earthbound forms and materials that were part of the vernacular architecture of the Old Southwest. As the architect for the bishop and Archdiocese of Santa Fe from 1934 to 1944, he designed new churches in a number of styles evoking Hispanic precedents. He was a planner of note, stewarding the development of the University of New Mexico for several decades and working to ensure the preservation of the historic plaza and adobes in Old Santa Fe. Indeed, his name became synonymous with Santa Fe as a historic and artistic nexus during its 20th century reawakening.

Meem was known for his attention to detail, and his seemingly simple forms were actually the product of meticulous study and design based upon knowledge of precedents. His plans for Zimmerman Library included no fewer than 41 vertical wall sections and 21 parapet drawings illustrating exactly how he wanted the finished walls to appear. He also personally supervised their construction, ordering their reworking on more than one occasion.

As his designs matured, Meem found the means to extend the vocabulary of Southwest regional forms. Comparing the Zimmerman Library (1933–37) with the Colorado Springs Fine Arts Center (1936–40) shows how a similar aesthetic could be rendered in different materials while maintaining a connection to type forms that are centuries old. In this extraordinary synthesis, Meem showed that modern architecture need not hew to the cold, anonymous vocabulary of the International Style, but might rather pursue direct connections to local building materials and traditions.

== Legacy ==
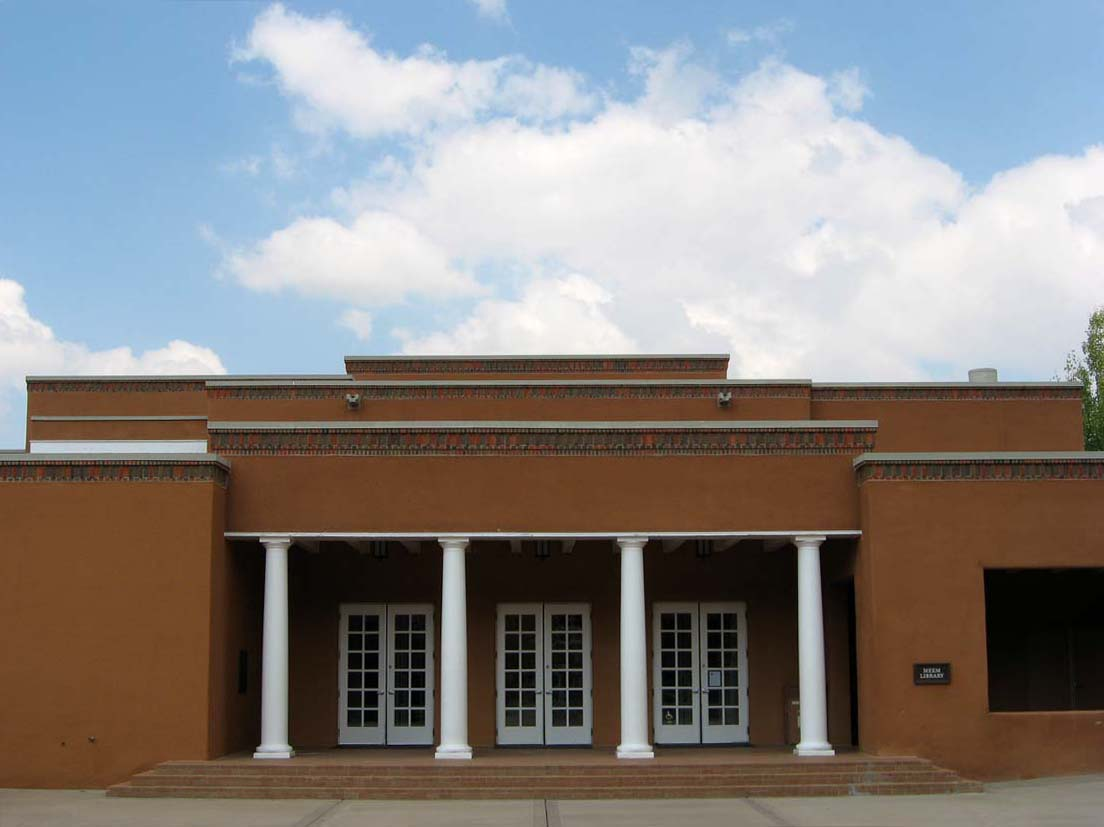
Meem Library (1990; David Perrigo, architect) on the St. John's College, Santa Fe campus was named in Meem's honor

Meem's influence on the city of Santa Fe was manifold. Not only did he design a large number of the city's most memorable buildings, he also headed the committee which authored the 1957 Historical Zoning Ordinance. This influential law ensured that all future buildings in central Santa Fe would adhere to the vernacular idioms and materials of the old quarter. Allowable design specifications were spelled out in considerable detail, guiding the development of the downtown for decades. With this, the city led the way toward sensitive preservation of historic districts throughout the United States. Though such strict adherence to one building tradition drew criticism, Meem's design sensibilities continue to influence new construction in Santa Fe today.

Meem also left a significant mark on the University of New Mexico campus, where his firm designed a total of 25 buildings between 1933 and 1959. He also served as a consultant on two later projects by Holien and Buckley. Two of the university buildings, Scholes Hall and Zimmerman Library, are regarded as some of Meem's most important works, and the library in particular is considered to be a masterpiece of southwestern architecture.

Most significantly, John Gaw Meem was an early advocate for an architecture of place instead of an architecture of machine-like standardization. He saw both the advantages and perils of Modernism, and strove always to ground his buildings in the rich tradition of southwest art and culture that were developed by Native Americans and extended by the Spanish. He saw his work not as historical replication but as a fresh, new interpretation of age-old methods of building in a hot, arid climate.

A number of Meem's works are listed on the U.S. National Register of Historic Places.

The library at St. John's College, Santa Fe is named after Meem.

== Works ==
Meem's office completed a total of 654 commissions, though some of these were not built and others, such as the commission for UNM, included dozens of individual buildings. Following is a list of some of Meem's most important works, which are located in Santa Fe unless otherwise noted.

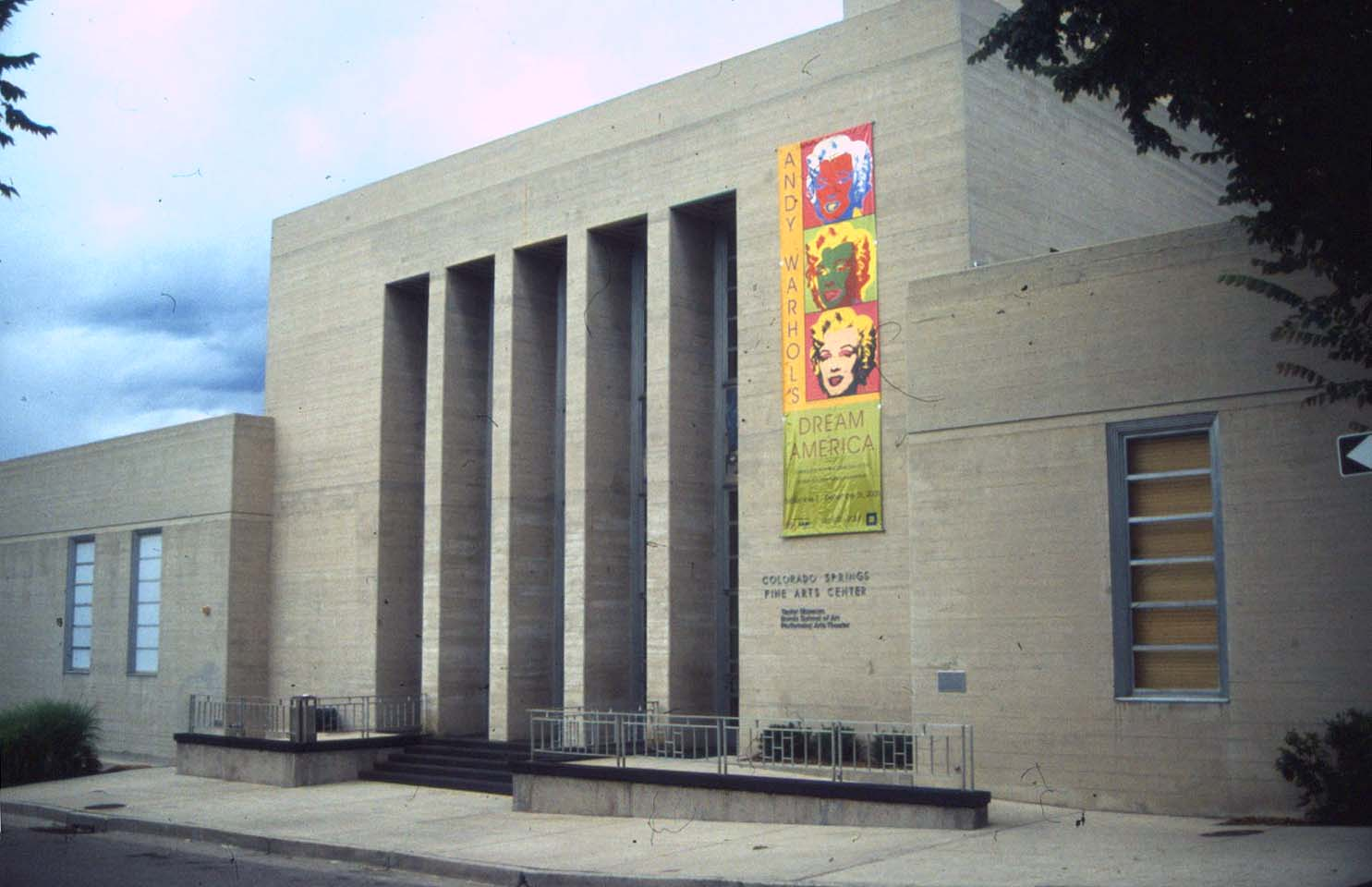
Colorado Springs Fine Arts Center

1924-28 Meem & McCormick

- San Estevan del Rey Mission Church, Acoma Pueblo (restoration, 1924–29)
- Hubert Galt Residence, Santa Fe (1924)
- Meadors/Staples/Anthony Residence, Santa Fe (1925)
- Daniel T. Kelly Residence, Santa Fe (1925)
- "Forked Lightning Ranch", Tex Austin/Fogelson-Garson Ranch, Pecos (1925–26)
- Mission Church at Santa Ana Pueblo (restoration, 1927)
- Palen Parish Hall, Holy Faith Episcopal Church, Santa Fe (1927)
- Mary Vilura Conkey Residence, Santa Fe (1927)
- Douglas Avenue School, Las Vegas, NM (1927)

1928-41 John Gaw Meem, Architect

- Fuller Lodge, Los Alamos Ranch School, Los Alamos, NM (1928)
- La Fonda Hotel, Santa Fe (expansion & remodel, 1929)
- Taylor Memorial Chapel, Colorado Springs (1929)
- Maj. Robert Hunter Clarkson Residence, Tesuque (1929)
- Laboratory of Anthropology & Director's Residence, Santa Fe (1930)
- Bandelier Hall, UNM, Albuquerque (1930)
- Cathedral House, Cathedral Church of St. John (Episcopal), Albuquerque (1930)
- San Jose de Gracia Church, Las Trampas (restoration, 1931–32)
- Fountain Valley School, Colorado Springs (1931–36)
- "Las Acequias", Cyrus McCormick Jr. Residence, Nambe (1931)
- Fray Angelico Chavez Library, Santa Fe (1932–33)
- "Los Poblanos", Simms Residence, Gardens by Rose Greely, Los Ranchos (1932)
- Santa Fe Indian School expansion & remodel, Santa Fe, Supervising Architect under Mayers Murray & Phillip (1933-34. demolished)
- Santa Maria Mission Church, McCartys, Acoma Pueblo (1933)
- "La Quinta" Pavilion at "Los Poblanos", Los Ranchos (1934)
- Scholes Hall, UNM, Albuquerque (1934)
- Rodgers Library (Rodgers Hall), NMHU, Las Vegas, NM (1934)
- Margaret Mary Mission Church, Paraje, Laguna Pueblo (1935)
- Colorado Springs Fine Arts Center, Colorado Springs (1936)
- Sacred Heart Church, Mesita, Laguna Pueblo (1936)
- Student Union (now Anthropology Building), UNM, Albuquerque (1936)
- Albuquerque Little Theatre, Murals by Dorothy Stewart, Albuquerque (1936. subsequently remodeled)
- Fine Arts Center, Colorado Springs (1936)
- Graham Gymnasium, WNMU, Silver City (remodel, 1936)
- Tatum Residence, Santa Fe (1937)
- Santa Fe Plaza remodel, Santa Fe (1937-54. Won competition sponsored by 1930 Cyrus McCormick Jr.)
- Robert Nordhouse Residence, Albuquerque (1935)
- Saint Thomas Church, Abiquiu (1935)
- Bernardinelli Building, (Main Branch, Santa Fe Public Library) (1936)
- Sandia School, Albuquerque (1938)
- Santa Fe County Courthouse, Santa Fe (1938)
- Zimmerman Library, Murals by Kenneth Adams, UNM, Albuquerque (1938)
- Maisel's Indian Trading Post, Albuquerque (1939)
- Cristo Rey Church, Santa Fe (1939)
- First Presbyterian Church, Santa Fe (1939)
- Kenneth Adamas Residence, Albuquerque (1939)
- Visitor Center, Coronado Historic Site (Kuaua Pueblo), Bernalillo (1939)
- St. Anne's Mission Church, Acomita, Acoma Pueblo (1940)
- Dodge-Bailey Residence, Santa Fe (1940)

1941-44 Meem & Zehner

1944-56 Meem Zehner & Holien

- Biology Annex, UNM, Albuquerque (1948)
- Immanuel Lutheran Church, Santa Fe (1948)
- Immanuel Presbyterian Church, Albuquerque (1949)
- Maestro John Crosby Residence, Santa Fe (1949)
- Raymond Jonson Residence and Gallery, UNM, Albuquerque (1949)
- St. James Episcopal Church, Clovis (1949)
- Cathedral Church of St. John (Episcopalian), Albuquerque (1950–52)
- Southern Union Gas Company Building, Albuquerque (1951)
- Clark Hall, UNM, Albuquerque (1951)
- Bishop Everett Jones Residence, Santa Fe (1951)
- Museum of International Folk Art, Galleries by Alexander Girard, Santa Fe (1953)
- Agnes Moya Canning Residence, Santa Fe (1953)
- Holy Faith Episcopal Church, reredos by Gustave Baumann (1945), Santa Fe (expansion & remodel, 1953)
- Good Shepherd Mission Church, Ft. Defiance, AZ (1955)
- Alumni Memorial Chapel, UNM, Albuquerque (1959–62)

== Gallery ==
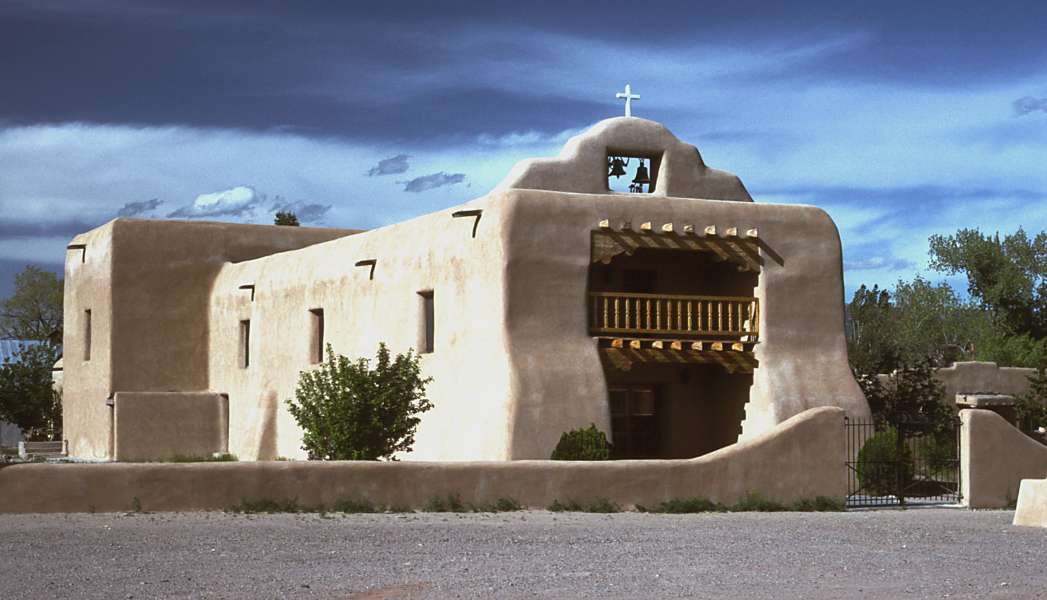
Santo Tomás Church, Abiquiu, NM

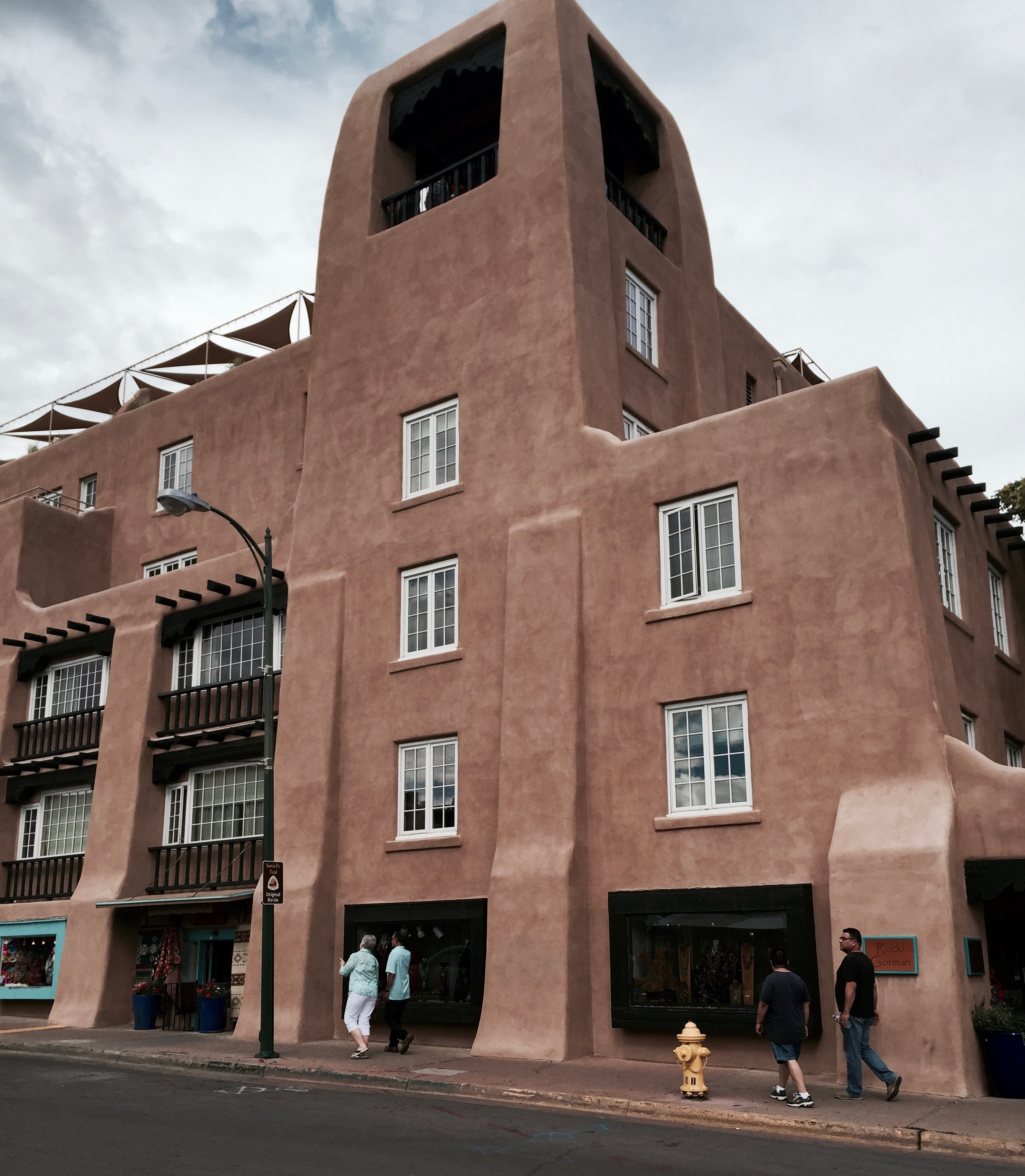
La Fonda on the Plaza Hotel, Santa Fe, NM

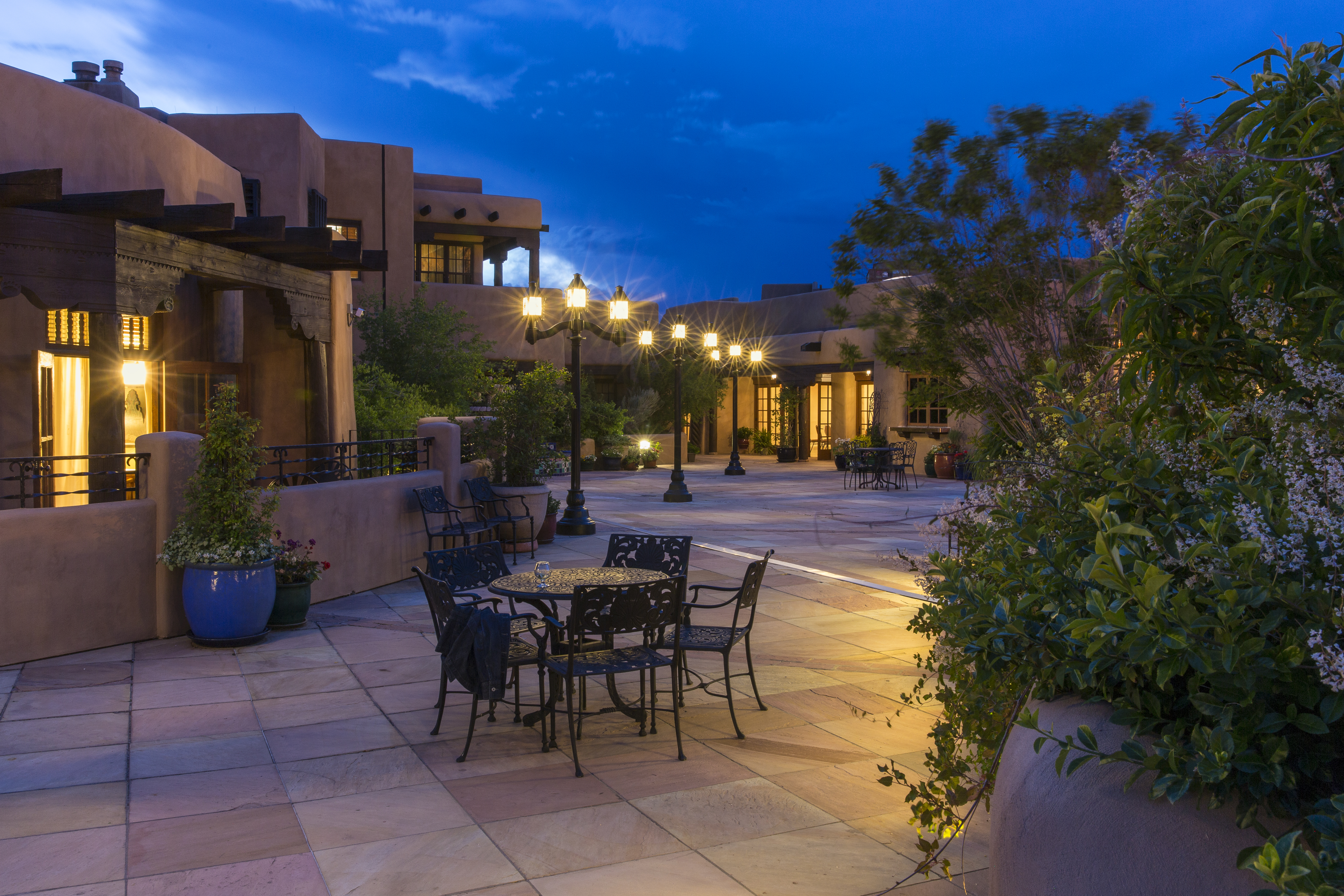
La Fonda terrace

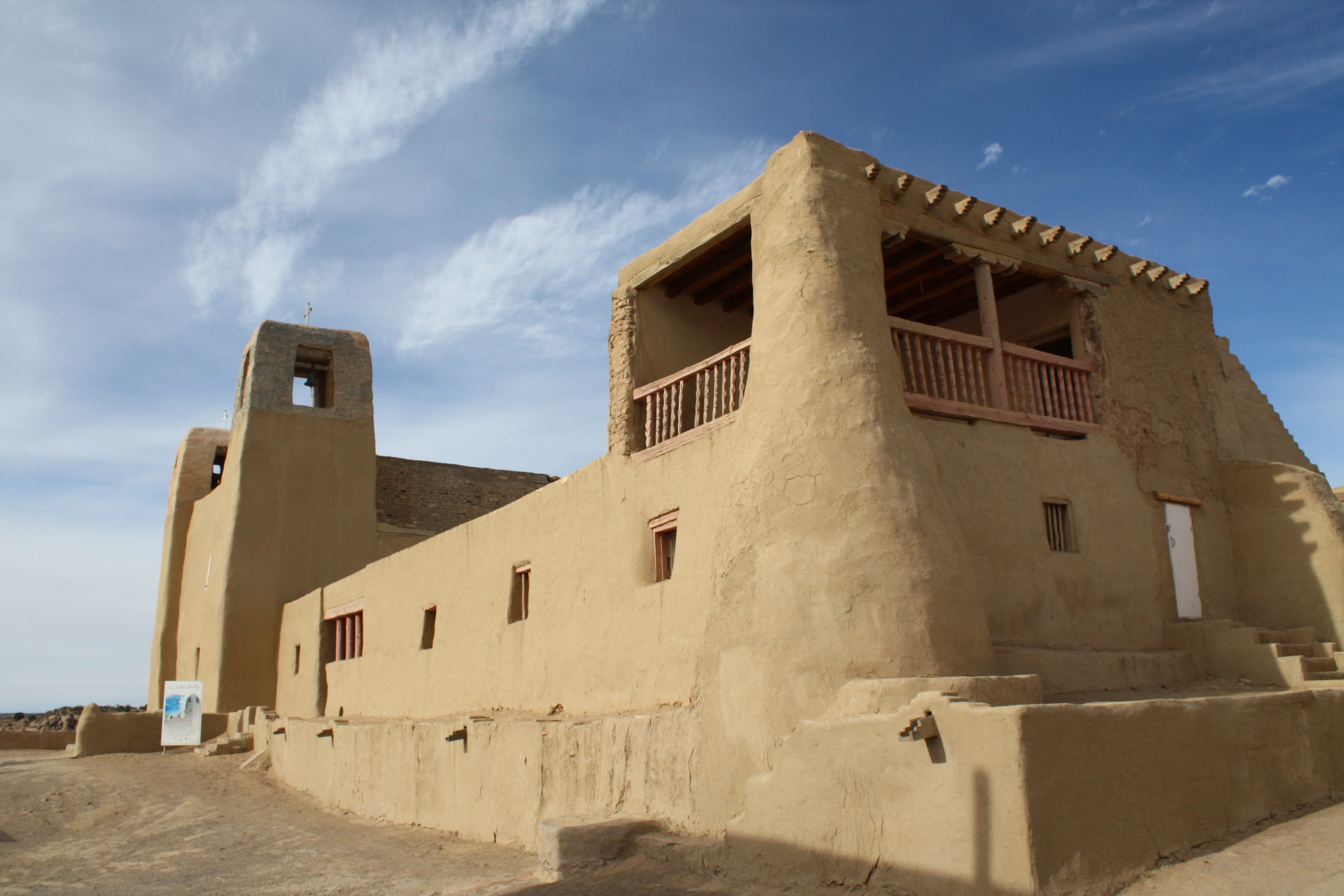
St Stephens Church at Acoma Pueblo, restoration Meem & McCormick

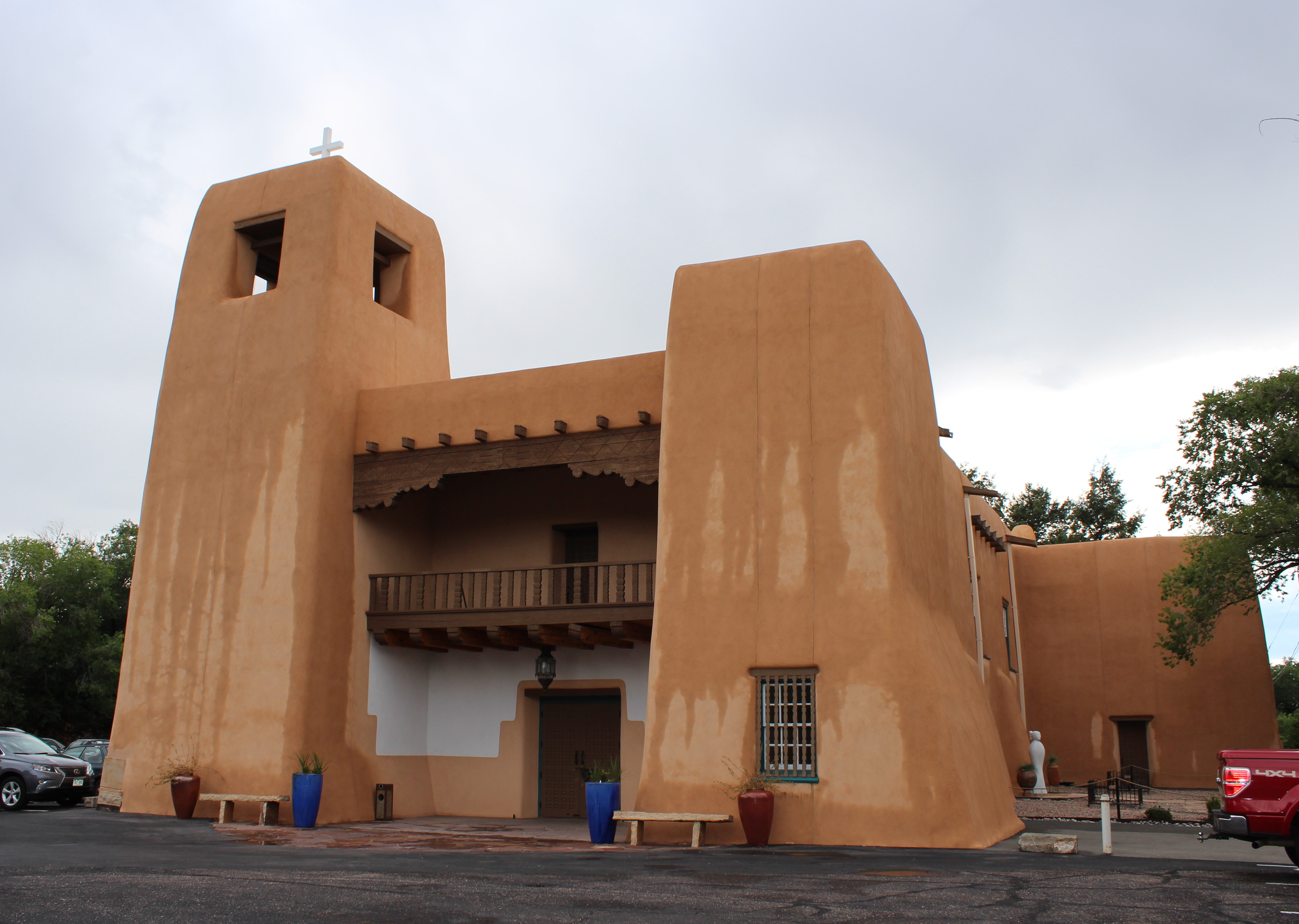
Cristo Rey Church, Santa Fe, NM

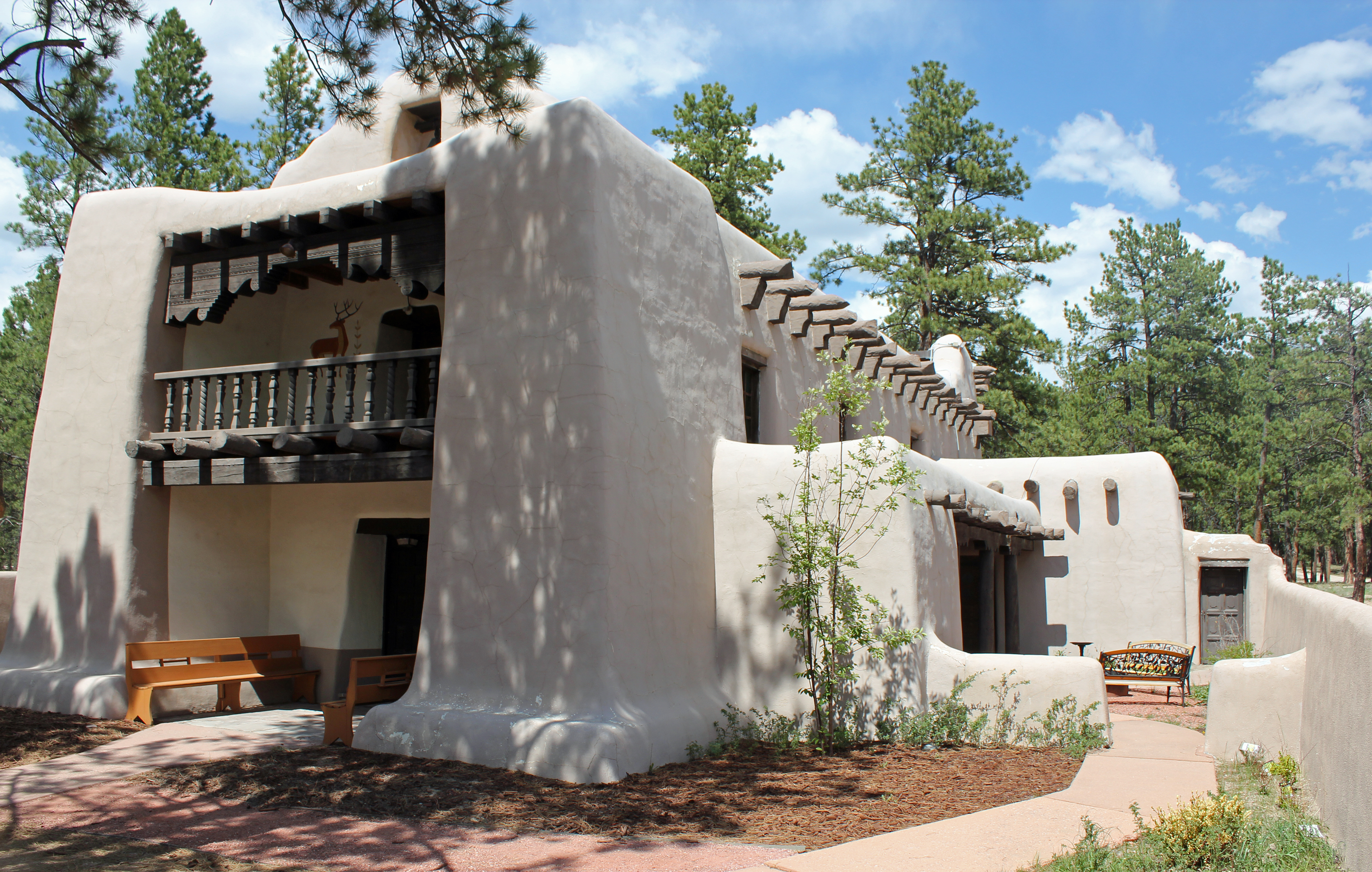
Taylor Memorial Chapel, Colorado Springs, CO

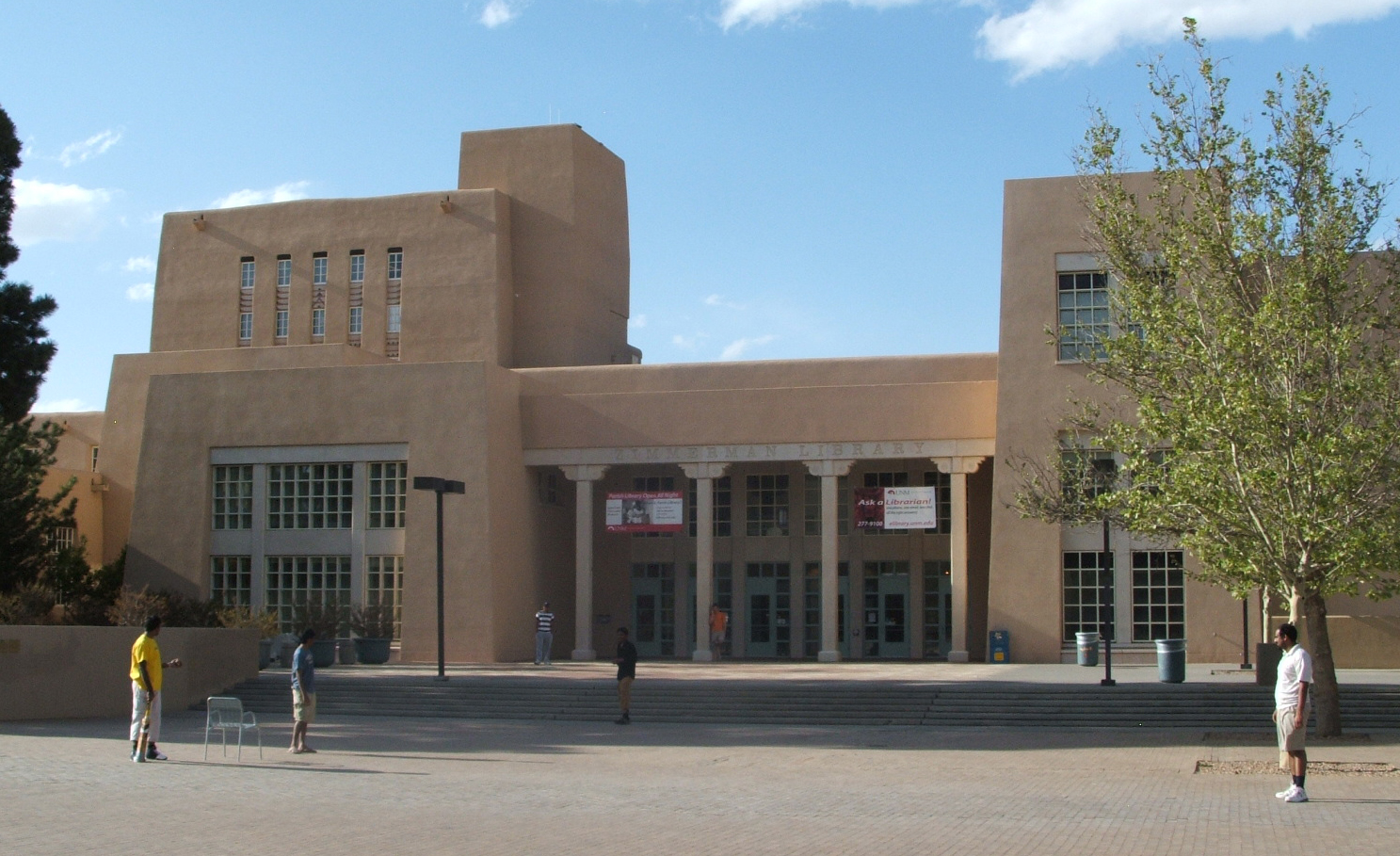
Zimmerman Library, University of New Mexico, Albuquerque

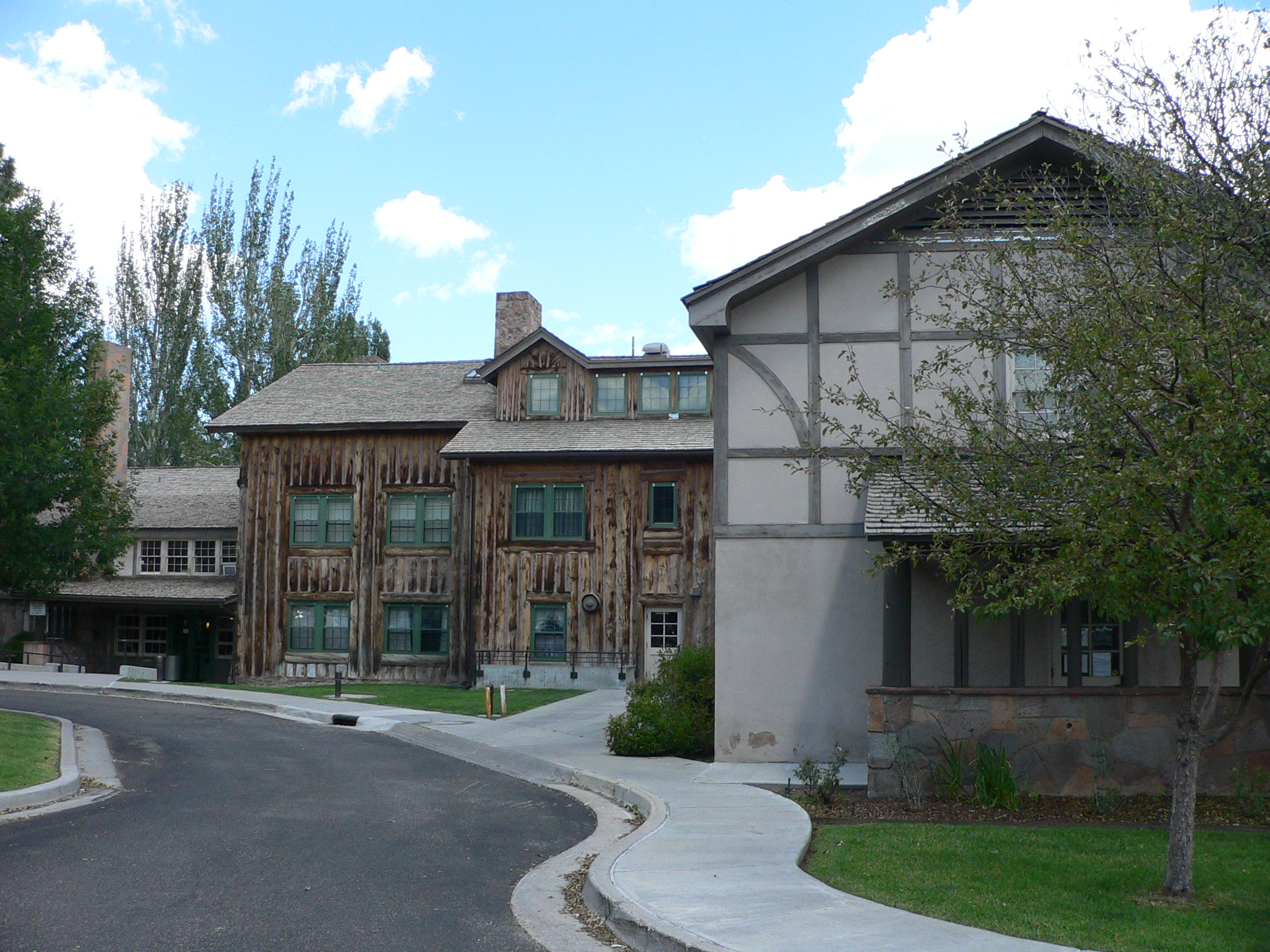
Fuller Lodge, Los Alamos, NM

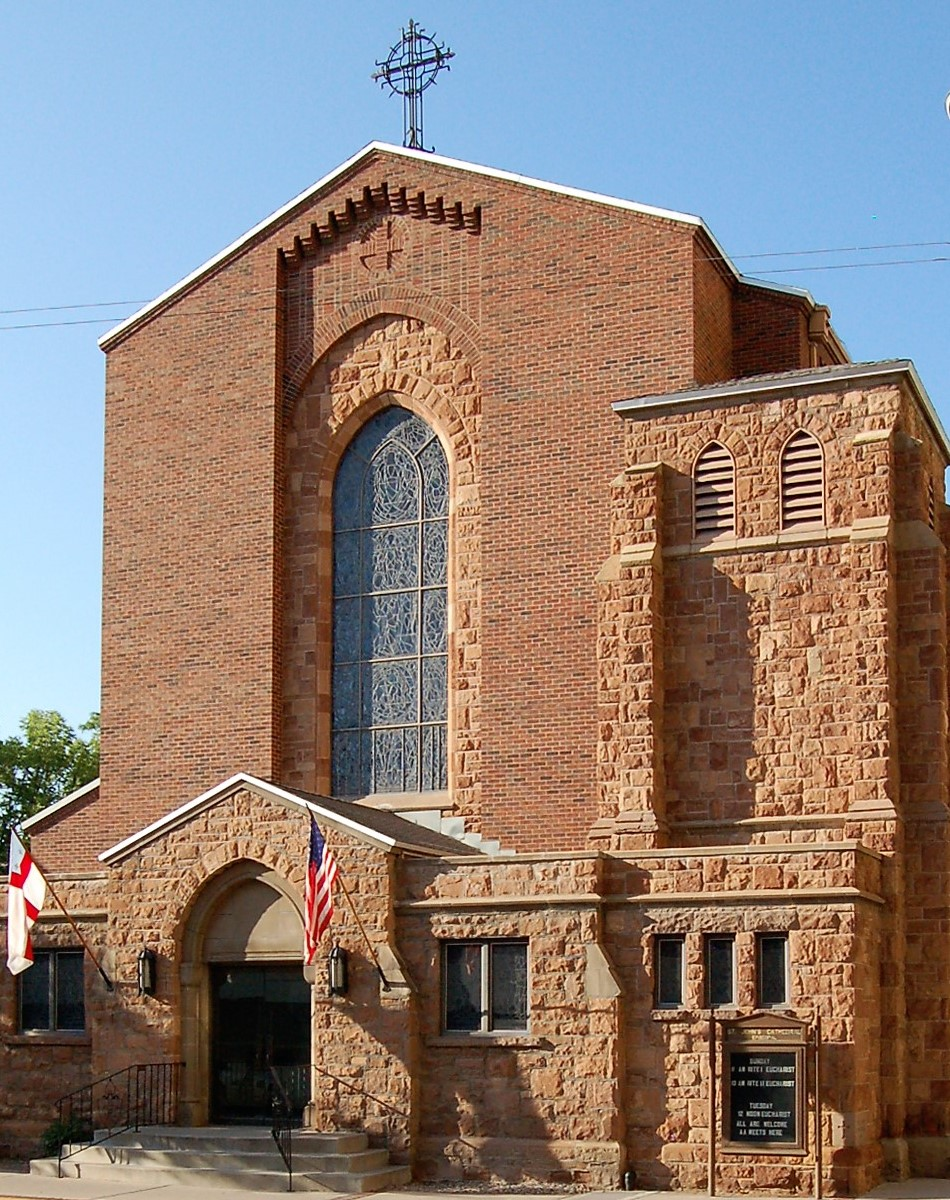
Cathedral Church of St. John Albuquerque

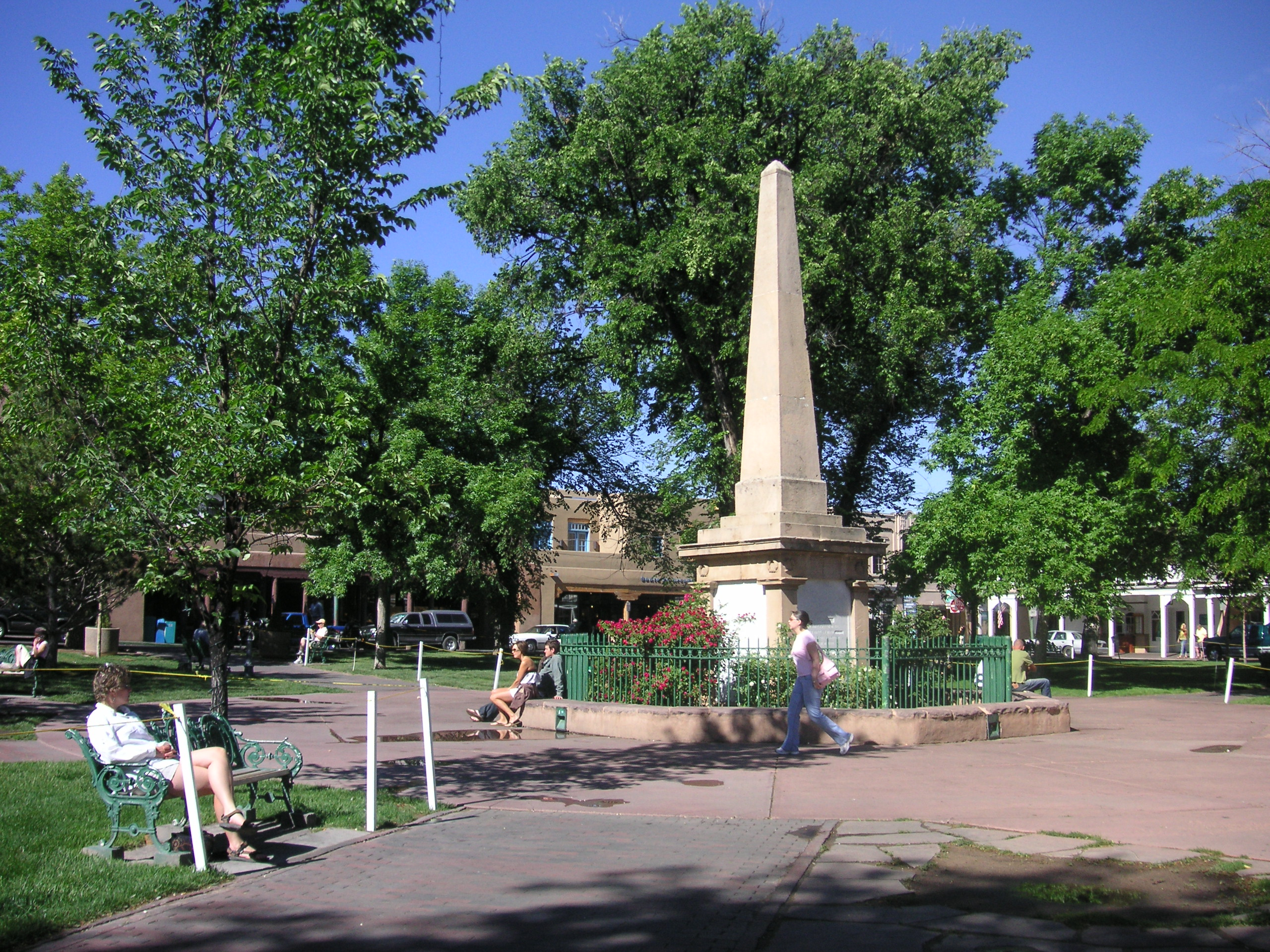
Santa Fe Plaza, remodel

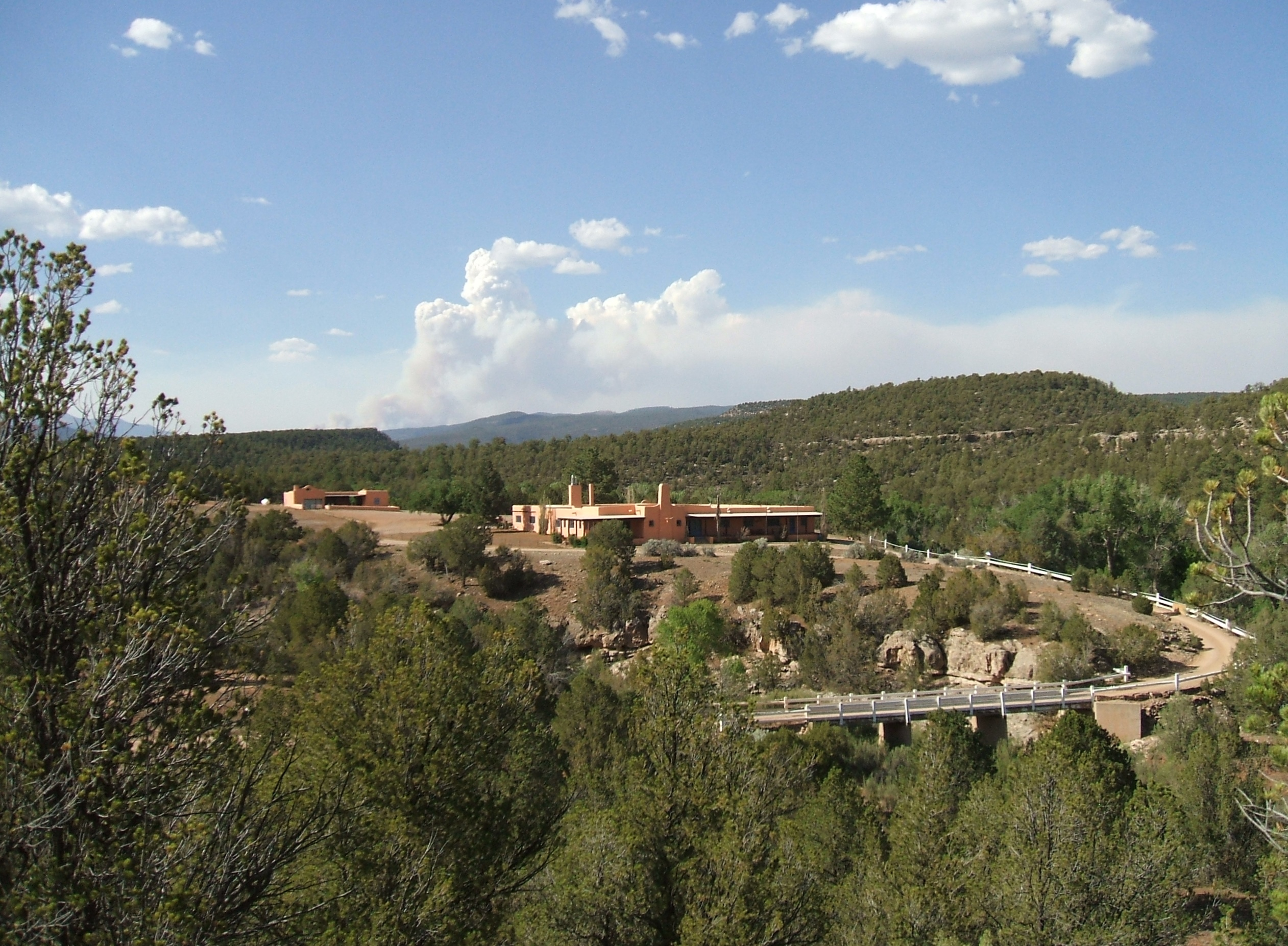
Forked Lightning Ranch Residence, Pecos National Historical Park

== See also ==
- Regionalism (art)
- Pueblo Revival architecture
- Mission Revival Style architecture
- Spanish Colonial Revival architecture
- Territorial Revival architecture
- Pueblo Deco architecture
- New Mexico
- Santa Fe
- Carlos Vierra
- Willard C. Kruger
- T. Charles Gaastra
- William Lumpkins

== Notes ==
1. Bunting (1983), preface
2. Bunting (1983), p. 14
3. Irish (1999) n.p.
4. Bunting (1983), pp. 145–154
5. Bunting (1983), pp. 14–21
6. Meem, John Gaw (September 1966). "Development of Spanish Pueblo Architecture in the Southwest." Mountain States Architecture, pp. 19–21
7. Bunting (1983), pp. 86–106
8. Harris (1997), pp. 18–21
9. Bunting (1983), p. 86
10. Bunting (1983), pp. 91–94
11. Hooker (2000)
12. Huddy, John T. (July 25, 2004). "Architect: SF Needs New Look." Albuquerque Journal.
13. Harris (1997), pp. 3–6
14. Bunting (1983), p. 20
