= List of presidents of the University of New Mexico =

This is a list of University of New Mexico presidents includes all permanent and interim presidents from the beginning of instruction in 1892 to the present.

No.	Image	President	Term start	Term end	Refs.
1		Elias S. Stover	1891	1897	
2		Clarence L. Herrick	1897	1901	
3		William G. Tight	1902	1909	
4		Edward D. M. Gray	1909	1912	
5		David R. Boyd	1912	1919	
6		David S. Hill	1919	1927	
7		James Fulton Zimmerman	1927	1944	
8		John Philip Wernette	1945	1948	
9		Thomas L. Popejoy	1948	1968	
10		Ferrel Heady	1968	1975	
11		William E. "Bud" Davis	1975	1982	
12		John Perovich	1982	1984	
13		Tom Farer	1985	1986	
14		Gerald May	1986	1990	
15		Richard Peck	1990	1998	
16		William C. Gordon	1999	2002	
17		F. Chris Garcia	2002	2003	
18		Louis Caldera	August 1, 2003	January 25, 2006	
19		David W. Harris	January 25, 2006	May 31, 2007	
20		David J. Schmidly	June 1, 2007	May 31, 2012	
21		Robert G. Frank	June 1, 2012	December 31, 2016	
22		Chaouki T. Abdallah	January 1, 2017	February 28, 2018	
23		Garnett S. Stokes	March 1, 2018	June 30, 2026	
24		Steve A. N. Goldstein	July 1, 2026	present	
