= Universities Research Association =

Consortium of research-oriented universities and colleges

- Formation: 1965
- Headquarters: Washington, D.C., United States
- Locations: United States; Italy; Japan; United Kingdom
- Members: 90
- Council of Presidents, Chair: Garnett S. Stokes (2023); President, University of New Mexico
- President and CEO: John C. Mester
- Website: URA

The Universities Research Association (URA) is a non-profit association of more than 90 research universities, primarily but not exclusively in the United States. It has members also in Japan, Italy, and the United Kingdom. It was founded in 1965 at the behest of the President's Science Advisory Committee and the National Academy of Sciences to build and operate Fermilab, a National Accelerator Laboratory.

== History ==
The President's Science Advisory Committee and a sister group of the United States Atomic Energy Commission joined forces in 1962 to "assess the future needs in high-energy accelerator physics." The panel's recommendations, issued in 1963, included the need to immediately commence design and construction on 200 GeV proton accelerators. An additional recommendation called for a new administrative construct.

On January 17, 1965, the National Academy of Sciences addressed the last recommendation by sponsoring a meeting of presidents from 25 research universities to discuss the management of the accelerator facility that would later become the Fermi National Accelerator Laboratory (Fermilab). The meeting eventually resulted in the decision to form the Universities Research Association, with 34 original members, to build and manage the new accelerator facility. URA filed its articles of incorporation on June 21, 1965. J. C. Warner, president of the Carnegie Institute of Technology, served as URA's first president.

== Projects ==
URA has helped develop the Tevatron at Fermilab. Its early activities are related to the Superconducting Supercollider, the Pierre Auger Observatory, the Long-Baseline Neutrino Facility (LBNF), and the associated Deep Underground Neutrino Experiment (DUNE), and involvement in the Honeywell International-led National Technology and Engineering Solutions at Sandia (NTESS) that manages and operates Sandia National Laboratories. Current major projects of the association include supporting Fermilab through a partnership with the University of Chicago and coordinating U.S. support of the Pierre Auger Cosmic Observatory.

== Members ==
=== United States ===
==== Alabama ====
- University of Alabama

==== Arizona ====
- Arizona State University
- University of Arizona

==== California ====
- California Institute of Technology
- University of California, Berkeley
- University of California, Davis
- University of California, Irvine
- University of California, Los Angeles
- University of California, Riverside
- University of California, San Diego
- University of California, Santa Barbara
- Stanford University

==== Colorado ====
- Colorado State University
- University of Colorado Boulder

==== Connecticut ====
- Yale University

==== Florida ====
- Florida State University
- University of Florida

==== Georgia ====
- Georgia Institute of Technology

==== Illinois ====
- University of Chicago
- Illinois Institute of Technology
- University of Illinois at Chicago
- University of Illinois at Urbana-Champaign
- Northern Illinois University
- Northwestern University
- Southern Illinois University Carbondale

==== Indiana ====
- Indiana University
- University of Notre Dame
- Purdue University

==== Iowa ====
- Iowa State University
- University of Iowa

==== Kansas ====
- Kansas State University

==== Kentucky ====
- University of Kentucky

==== Louisiana ====
- Louisiana State University
- Tulane University

==== Maryland ====
- Johns Hopkins University
- University of Maryland, College Park

==== Massachusetts ====
- Boston University
- Harvard University
- Massachusetts Institute of Technology
- Northeastern University
- Tufts University

==== Michigan ====
- Michigan State University
- University of Michigan
- Wayne State University

==== Minnesota ====
- University of Minnesota, Twin Cities

==== Mississippi ====
- University of Mississippi

==== Missouri ====
- Washington University in St. Louis

==== Nebraska ====
- University of Nebraska–Lincoln

==== New Jersey ====
- Princeton University
- Rutgers University

==== New Mexico ====
- New Mexico State University
- University of New Mexico

==== New York ====
- University at Buffalo
- Columbia University
- Cornell University
- University of Rochester
- Rockefeller University
- Stony Brook University
- Syracuse University

==== North Carolina ====
- Duke University
- University of North Carolina at Chapel Hill

==== Ohio ====
- Case Western Reserve University
- Ohio State University

==== Oklahoma ====
- University of Oklahoma

==== Oregon ====
- University of Oregon

==== Pennsylvania ====
- Carnegie Mellon University
- Pennsylvania State University
- University of Pennsylvania
- University of Pittsburgh

==== Rhode Island ====
- Brown University

==== South Carolina ====
- University of South Carolina

==== Tennessee ====
- University of Tennessee
- Vanderbilt University

==== Texas ====
- University of Houston
- University of North Texas
- Rice University
- Southern Methodist University
- Texas A&M University
- Texas Tech University
- University of Texas at Arlington
- University of Texas at Austin
- University of Texas at Dallas

==== Virginia ====
- Virginia Polytechnic Institute and State University
- University of Virginia
- College of William & Mary

==== Washington ====
- University of Washington

==== Wisconsin ====
- University of Wisconsin-Madison

=== Italy ===
- University of Pisa

=== Japan ===
- Waseda University

=== United Kingdom ===
- University College London
- University of Edinburgh
- University of Liverpool
- University of Manchester
