= American School for Girls =

American School for Girls may refer to:

- The American School for Girls in Lebanon, now Lebanese American University
- American School for Girls (Iraq) in Baghdad, Iraq
