= F. Chris Garcia =

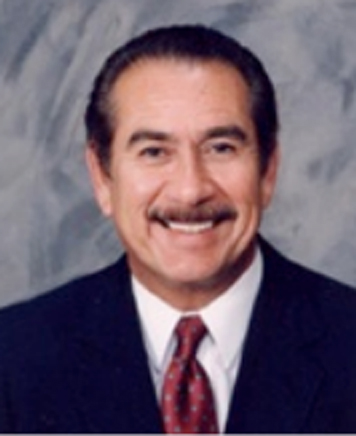

17th President of the University of New Mexico
- In office 2002–2003
- Preceded by: William C. Gordon
- Succeeded by: Louis Caldera

Personal details
- Born: April 15, 1940 (age 86) Albuquerque, NM
- Education: University of New Mexico (BA, MA); University of California, Davis (Ph.D.)

F. Chris Garcia (born April 15, 1940) is an educator, scholar, researcher, author, public opinion pollster and higher education administrator. From 2002-2003, he served as the president of University of New Mexico. Garcia was the first native New Mexican Hispanic to serve as a college dean, academic vice-president and president at the University of New Mexico. Garcia was charged and later cleared of charges of promoting prostitution, conspiracy, and tampering with evidence.[3]

== Early life and education ==
Garcia was born April 15, 1940, in Albuquerque, New Mexico. He was the first of six children born to Flaviano Perea Garcia and Crucita A. Garcia. His christened name was Flaviano Cresencio Garcia. Garcia was baptized at San Ignacio Church in Martineztown, an Albuquerque neighborhood, where his father was raised. Garcia is a 13th generation native New Mexican, descended from Juan Lopez Holguin, who came from the Extremadura community of Spain with the Juan de Oñate expedition to settle in the Santa Fe, New Mexico area in 1598. His tenth grandfather, Francisco Montez Vigil was a member of the Diego de Vargas group that re-entered Santa Fe, New Mexico, in 1692.

Garcia first attended St. Francis Catholic Xavier School on south Broadway, close to his maternal grandmother's home where he spent the first seven years of his life. In 1947, his family moved to the north valley of Albuquerque. He graduated from Valley High School in 1957.

A few days after graduating from high school, Garcia joined the New Mexico Air National Guard (NMANG) and went to eleven weeks of basic training at Lackland Air Force Base in San Antonio, Texas. He served a six-year term in the NMANG. After completing basic training, Garcia matriculated at the University of New Mexico. He was a charter member of the initial General Honors Program. As Garcia proceeded through college, his interest in human behavior channeled him toward the social sciences, and he majored in Government and Citizenship, earning a BA in 1961. Interested in education and teaching from an early age, he hoped to become a high school teacher and continued at UNM to earn a master's degree in Government and Education with a Secondary Education certificate. After doing student teaching at his alma mater high school, Garcia was encouraged to continue his education so that he could teach at the college level.

Garcia was accepted at the University of California at Los Angeles (UCLA) and began his studies in political science there in 1964. Later, he transferred to the newly instituted doctoral program in political science at the University of California at Davis (UCD) where he was awarded a Ph.D. in 1972.

== Beginning: A family and career ==
On September 2, 1967, Garcia married Sandra Dorine Galloway, also an Albuquerque native and a graduate of Valley High school and the University of New Mexico. Since Garcia had obtained a faculty position in the Political Science department at the University of New Mexicoin the fall of 1970, he and his wife moved back to Albuquerque in the summer of 1970.

Garcia began his academic career while completing his doctoral dissertation on the development of political orientations of Mexican American children in California. He was hired as an Assistant Professor of Political Science to teach courses in American Politics, Public Opinion, Political Socialization and New Mexico Government. Garcia also originated and taught courses in Politics and Education, The Politics of Ethnic Groups and Chicano Politics. Garcia initially also had an appointment as an Assistant Director at the Division of Government Research in the Institute of Social Research and Development (ISRAD).

The Garcia's first child, Elaine Louise, was born on May 18, 1971, and their second daughter, Tanya Crucita arrived on November 10, 1974.

== Professor ==
Based on his research, publications and teaching, Garcia was awarded tenure and promoted from Assistant Professor to Associate Professor in 1974. Based on his continued scholarship he was promoted to Full Professor in 1978. He is one of the pioneers researching and writing in the field of Hispanic/Latino politics. His recognition as a scholar in this area as well as in campaigns, elections and New Mexico politics led to his being sought out for commentary and analysis by local, national and international media. After many years as a productive scholar, his accomplishments as a teacher, researcher and scholar were recognized as he was awarded the title of Distinguished Professor of Political Science. He retired from full-time teaching in 2007, but continued with his scholarly writings and taught a course in US Political Cultures on a part-time basis until 2011.

While active in the political science profession he was very involved in its professional organizations. He served on several executive councils and committees of the American Political Science Association, Western Political Science Association, Western Social Science Association, Southwestern Social Science Association and American Association for Public Opinion Research. He was elected as Vice-President of the American Political Science Association (1994-1995) and President of the Western Political Science Association (1977-1978). Garcia is also a member of Phi Beta Kappa, Phi Kappa Phi, Pi Sigma Alpha and Golden Key honorary fraternities.

== Pollster ==
In 1973, he and two colleagues formed Zia Research Associates, a public opinion polling organization. This was the first full-service opinion survey research firm in the state of New Mexico. Zia Research enjoyed remarkable success as it accurately analyzed and projected the results of campaigns and elections in the state of New Mexico for the next twenty-five years. While his wife Sandy took over management of the firm, Garcia supplied political, historical and election commentary and analysis on local and national television stations as well as for the national and international press.

== Administration ==
Although one of his doctoral study fields was public administration, Garcia did not plan to enter the administrative profession, nor did he suspect that his study would be of use when he made an unplanned entry into higher education administration. In 1975, he was asked to be an Assistant Dean in the College of Arts and Sciences. A year later he was promoted to Associate Dean. After a nationwide search, he was selected as Dean of the College of Arts and Sciences, and he served in that position from July 1980 through December 1986 In that position he was the CEO and CFO of twenty academic departments and several institutes, centers and museums in the areas of the physical sciences, social sciences and humanities. Garcia was the first Hispanic American to be the Dean of the college. Garcia was persuaded to submit his application for the position of Vice-President for Academic Affairs, and after a national search, he was selected as the AVP, a position in which he served from January 1987 to July 1990. He returned to the political science faculty, but was called back to serve as an interim Provost twice—from January 1993 to July of that year and again from August 1998 to January 2000.

In 2002, a faculty petition requested that the Regents appoint Garcia to the UNM Presidency. Although reluctant to return to administration, he was honored by this demonstration of collegial support and accepted a one-year term of service, 2002-2003. He was the first Hispanic American to be president of UNM. After completing his term, and having a sabbatical, he returned to the political science department.

== Research and publications ==
Garcia is the author, co-author, editor or co-editor of more than sixty books, monographs, chapters, articles and reviews. His twelve books include: The Political Socialization of Chicano Children (1973); The Chicano Political Experience (1977); Latinos and the Political System (1988); Latino Voices: Mexican, Puerto Rican and Cuban Perspectives on American Politics (1992); Pursuing Power: Latinos and the Political System (1997); Hispanics and the US Political System: Moving into the Mainstream (2008), and four editions of New Mexico Government (1976, 1981, 1994, 2006). He has presented numerous papers and served as a discussant at many professional conferences and conventions and has been a consultant to many civic, political and educational organizations, including the Educational Testing Service.

His involvement in the most extensive research project was as Co-Principal Investigator in the first nationally representative study of the political attitudes and behaviors of Mexican Americans, Puerto Ricans and Cuban Americans—the Latino National Political Survey. The multi-year project (1987-1993) received over $2 million of grant support and involved door-to-door, in-person interviews of over 2,817 Latinos and 598 non-Latinos nationwide.

== Awards and honors ==
Garcia is the recipient of several awards and recognitions. These honors include the Silver Horizons Albuquerque Hall of Fame, 2009; Distinguished Service Award, North Central Association Higher Learning Commission, 2007; Honorary Commander, New Mexico Air National Guard, 2005-2006; Bernard S. Rodey Award for Educational Leadership, UNM Alumni Association, 2004; the State of New Mexico Governor's Distinguished Public Service Award, 2003; University of New Mexico, Mortar Board, LOBO Award, 2003; New Mexico State Senate Memorial 50, “Memorial of Appreciation Recognizing Contributions to the State of New Mexico,”46th Legislature, First Session, 2003; the American Political Science Association, Franklin J. Goodnow Award for Distinguished Service, 2001; the University of New Mexico Alumni Association Zia Award for Outstanding UNM Alumni, 1997; the University of New Mexico Regents Meritorious Service Medal, 1996; Chief Manuelito Appreciation Award, "In Recognition of Meritorious Contribution to Navajo Education," Presented by the Navajo Nation, April 15, 1986; American Political Science Association, Recognition Award, COSCP, "In Recognition of Excellence in Scholarship and Service to the Profession," August 29, 1985; New Mexico Humanities Council Newspaper Project Award for "Public Opinion Polls: An Addition to Our Political Education," January, 1983; Outstanding Alumni Award, Valley High School, Albuquerque, 1981; Literary Award, UNM Mesa Chicana, Association of Chicano Students, May 1977; inclusion in Who's Who in the World, Who's Who in America, Who’s Who in American Education, Who's Who in the West, Who's Who Among Hispanic Americans and Contemporary Authors.

== "Southwest Companions" Scandal ==
Garcia was arrested in June 2011 for his alleged role in an online prostitution ring operating through a website called "Southwest Companions" described as a private, subscription-based website that connected sex workers with clients, featuring a "trusted" tier for members and a database of escorts, with prices ranging from $200 to $10,000 per hour.

Police alleged that Garcia (then a 71-year-old professor emeritus) was a "moderator" for the site, specifically identifying him by the username "Burque Pops" and accusing him of helping to vet or recruit, and having sexual encounters with, sex workers.

The site was allegedly operated primarily by David C. Flory, a physics professor at Fairleigh Dickinson University in New Jersey.

The criminal case against Garcia fell apart when a New Mexico state district judge ruled in 2012 that the website did not constitute a "house of prostitution" under existing law. In February 2013, the New Mexico Supreme Court upheld this, and charges of promoting prostitution, conspiracy, and tampering with evidence were not prosecuted.

Following his legal clearance, Garcia argued for the reinstatement of his privileges as a professor emeritus.

Although the criminal case was dismissed, then-UNM President Robert Frank described the incident as a "significant lapse in judgment" that brought negative attention to the university.
