= Raida =

Raida may refer to

- Raido, a Proto-Germanic name
- Al-Raida (The Woman Pioneer), a Lebanese feminist journal
- Roc Raida (1972–2009), American DJ, turntablist and producer
