= Raidah =

Raidah is an Arabic word meaning leader or pioneer, sometimes used as a personal name. It can also refer to:

- Raydah, a community in Yemen
- al-Raida, a quarterly peer-reviewed feminist academic journal covering women's and gender studies
- Da Raidahs, a nickname for the Las Vegas Raiders, an American football team
