= Robert G. Frank =

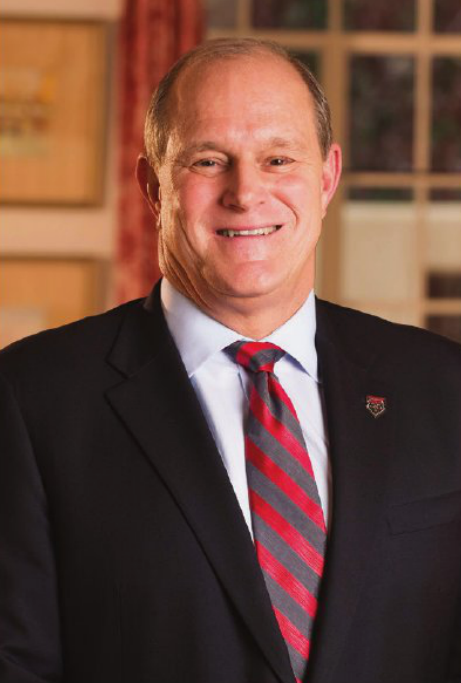

21st President of the University of New Mexico
- In office June 1, 2012 – May 31, 2017
- Preceded by: David J. Schmidly
- Succeeded by: Chaouki Abdallah

Personal details
- Born: 1952 (age 73–74)
- Spouse: Janet Frank
- Children: 2
- Education: University of New Mexico (BS, MA, Ph.D.)

Robert G. Frank (born 1952) is an American academic administrator and faculty member. He was appointed as the fifth dean of the College of Health Related Professions at the University of Florida in 1995. The name of the college changed to the College of Public Health and Health Professions while he was dean. In 2007, he was appointed as Provost and Senior Vice President for Academic Affairs at Kent State University. He then served as the 21st President of the University of New Mexico from 2012 to 2017.

== Personal and early life ==
Frank grew up in an Army family and lived in many places including France, Massachusetts, Georgia, California, Iran and New Mexico. He graduated from Mayfield High School in Las Cruces, New Mexico. During high school, he became and Eagle Scout. He also swam on the local AAU swim team. He set state records in the 100 meter breaststroke in the 15-17 and open divisions and the 200 meter breaststroke in the open division. Though Mayfield High School did not have a swimming team, in his senior year, a team including Mayfield and Las Cruces High School students was allowed to swim in the state championship meet. He placed first in the 100 yard breaststroke and set a state record. Coach John Mechem at the University of New Mexico offered him a swimming scholarship at the University of New Mexico (UNM). He went on to receive three degrees from UNM. He graduated magna cum laude with a B.S. in 1974. He lettered four times. In his senior year, he was a co-caption of the men's swimming team that placed 10th at the NCAA championship. He was named to the 1974 All-American team. He enrolled in the psychology graduate program at UNM and earned M.A. in 1977, and Ph.D. in Clinical Psychology in 1979. He is the first UNM President to hold three degrees from the university. He and his wife Janet have two adult children, Daniel and Brian and a Labrador retriever, Coach.

== Career ==
Frank first appointment was at the University of Missouri-Columbia, where he moved through the academic ranks to become the youngest professor in the School of Medicine. He was appointed as a Robert Wood Johnson Health Policy Fellow in 1991. He worked in the office of Senator Jeff Bingaman (D-NM). Returning to Missouri, he managed Governor Mel Carnahan's health reform effort working with Missouri's Secretary of Health, Dr. Coleen Kivalahan. In 1995, he was appointed the Dean of the College of Public Health and Health Professions in the University of Florida. Frank served as the Provost and Senior Vice President at Kent State University in Ohio for five years. On January 4, 2012, the University of New Mexico Board of Regents voted unanimously to name him their 21st President. He was officially inaugurated as president on November 18, 2012. During his tenure as president he led a comprehensive effort to improve retention of undergraduates. Retention improved from under 74% to over 80% during his tenure. Also, during his tenure, the university created the Honors College and the College of Population Health. He also led a collaboration with the city of Albuquerque and Bernalillo County to create an innovation district in Albuquerque. With Frank's leadership, the university built the first building in the district. The building, called the Lobo Rainforest Building, houses the university's economic development program as well as UNM's Rainforest Innovations, the university's intellectual property program. The Lobo Rainforest building includes space for start-ups and offices for organizations critical to Albuquerque'd innovation ecosystem. Sandia Labs, Air Force Research Lab, and General Atomics all are located in the building. The Lobo Rainforest Building also is home to UNM's Innovation Academy, a program created with Frank's leadership to offer classes on entrepreneurship across all the colleges in the university. He left the presidency in 2017 and joined the faculty in the College of Population Health. He directs the Center for Innovation in Health and Education. Recently, he was appointed director of the MPH program in the college. He is also leading UNM's effort to develop a health policy center serving New Mexico's Medicaid program.
