= Chaouki Abdallah =

Lebanese-American engineer and academic administrator

22nd President of the University of New Mexico
- In office January 1, 2017 – February 28, 2018
- Preceded by: Robert G. Frank
- Succeeded by: Garnett S. Stokes

Personal details
- Born: Chaouki Tanios Abdallah Lebanon
- Education: Youngstown State University (BS); Georgia Institute of Technology (MS, PhD)

Chaouki Tanios Abdallah is a Lebanese American engineer and academic administrator who currently serves as the 10th President of the Lebanese American University.

== Early life and education ==
Abdallah was born and raised in Lebanon. He began his education at the Saint Joseph University before earning a Bachelor of Science in engineering from Youngstown State University. Abdallah earned a Master of Science and PhD in electrical engineering from Georgia Tech.

== Career ==
Abdallah was active in designing international graduate programs with Latin American and European countries. In 1990, he co-founded the Ibero-American Science and Technology Education Consortium (ISTEC), which includes more than 150 universities in Latin America, Spain and the United States.

Abdallah's teaching and research speciality is systems theory, particularly related to robotic control and communications systems. He is a recipient of the Millennium Medal of the Institute of Electrical and Electronics Engineers. He has published more than 300 peer-reviewed papers and seven books, including Robot Manipulator Control: Theory and Practice (2003, with Lewis and Dawson).

He joined UNM's Electrical and Computer Engineering department, chairing the department between 2005 and 2011. He served as provost of the UNM between 2011 and 2016, after which he became president from 2017 to 2018, initially in an acting capacity. Abdallah left the University of New Mexico to serve as executive vice president for research at Georgia Tech. Abdallah left Georgia Tech in September 2024 to take up the post of president of the Lebanese American University on 1 October 2024.

Under the leadership of Dr. Chaouki Abdallah, research expenditures at the Georgia Institute of Technology saw a substantial increase, rising from approximately $850 million in 2018, when he began his term, to $1.45 billion by December 2023.
