= Salwa Nassar =

Lebanese physicist

- Born: 1913
- Died: February 17, 1967 (aged 53–54)
- Education: American University of Beirut, Smith College, University of California at Berkeley
- Occupations: Nuclear physicist, college administrator
- Organization(s): Beirut College for Women, American University of Beirut

Salwa Nassar (1913 – February 17, 1967) was the first Lebanese woman nuclear physicist.

She received her doctorate in physics from the University of California at Berkeley in 1945. In 1965, she became president of the Beirut College for Women (BCW), now the Lebanese American University (LAU).

She campaigned for equal rights for women, particularly in sciences. She was also actively involved in promoting the peaceful use of nuclear energy.

== Biography ==
=== Youth and Education ===
Salwa Chukri Nassar was born into a modest family in Dhour-el-Shweir, Lebanon. After attending elementary school in her village, she completed her secondary education at Brummana High School.

She then enrolled in the two-year program at the American Junior College for Women (which would become BCW and then LAU) thanks to the support of her parents. Convinced of her great potential, several professors helped her pursue studies at the American University of Beirut (AUB), where she became the first woman mathematics student. To finance her studies, she worked as an assistant in the chemistry lab.

After graduating with honors, she taught mathematics for three years at Beir Zeit University in Palestine, followed by a year in Iraq to raise the funds needed to continue her studies in the United States.

In 1939 she entered Smith College in Massachusetts and earned a master's degree in physics in 1940. She was then accepted at the prestigious physics department at the University of California, Berkeley. She worked with E. Lawrence on the development of the sector mass spectrometer in nuclear physics . Her inability to obtain nuclear material for her experiments led her to choose another research topic. She chose to study cosmic radiations and completed her doctorate in 1945, becoming the eighth woman to receive a physics degree from Berkeley and the first Lebanese woman to receive a Ph.D. in physics.

=== Teaching and Research ===
Salwa C. Nassar returned to Lebanon in 1945. She joined the American Junior College for Women where she taught mathematics and developed a physics curriculum.

In 1949, the University of Michigan at Ann Arbor invited her to join its ranks to set up a cloud chamber. During her trip to the United States, she participated in two physics conferences (in Italy and Basel). She was also invited to spend a month at the École Polytechnique in Paris. She then made stops at the Harwell Technology Center and the University of Bristol in England.

In 1950, she returned to Lebanon and joined the Physics Department at AUB, where she held the positions of professor and chairwoman (starting in 1952). Her academic career was divided between teaching and research in physics at AUB. Nassar's academic publications included research articles and essays on higher education, such as "The Wonders of Creativity" (1962).

In 1956, she returned to Ann Arbor for a year as a visiting professor. Her fame was such that she was listed in the 1960 "Who's Who in Atoms."

In 1965, she was appointed president of the Beirut College for Women. She was the first lebanese appointed president.

=== Various involvements ===
==== Promotion of Scientific Research ====
Throughout her career, Salwa C. Nassar was involved in the development of scientific research in general and in Lebanon. Her efforts culminated in the creation of the National Council for Scientific Research of Lebanon in 1962, of which she was a founding member.

==== Women and Education ====
A pioneering feminist in Lebanon, particularly sensitive to the plight of women in the Middle East, Salwa C. Nassar often addressed this topic during her lectures, emphasizing the importance of their full participation in the workforce and their right to all levels of education. Furthermore, she encouraged women to enter scientific disciplines.

==== Peaceful Nuclear Energy ====
Since her work at Berkeley, Salwa C. Nassar has consistently emphasized the importance of using nuclear energy for peaceful purposes in medical and industrial applications. From 1950 until her death, she represented Lebanon in more than ten international conferences on this subject, including the first three "International Conference on the Uses of Atomic Energy for Peaceful Purposes" held in Geneva (1955, 1958, 1964).

== Personal life ==
Salwa Nassar died in 1967, from leukemia, aged 54 years. The Salwa C. Nassar Foundation for Lebanese Studies was named in her memory.
