= Rose Ghorayeb =

Lebanese writer (1909–1996)

- Rose Ghorayeb
- Born: 1909; Damour, Lebanon
- Died: 2006 (97 years old)
- Occupations: Writer, Author, Professor
- Years active: 70

Rose Ghorayeb (Arabic: روز غريّب, born 1909 – died 2006) was a Lebanese writer, author, literary critic, and feminist. She was a professor of Arabic literature at the Lebanese American University and was frequently referred to as the "first female critic in Arabic literature". Regarded as a pioneer in aesthetic criticism, her literary career spanned more than 70 years and included many children stories, articles, biographies and plays.

== Biography ==
Ghorayeb was born in Damour, Lebanon in 1909. In 1932, she graduated from the American Junior College for Women in Beirut, a predecessor to the Lebanese American University. In 1948, the college renamed itself the Beirut College for Women. After graduating, she taught Arabic literature at Iraqi universities from 1937 to 1941, and then returned to Lebanon, continuing her studies at the American University of Beirut. After completing further studies in literary criticism, she taught Arabic literature at the Beirut College for Girls for more than forty years, eventually becoming the head of its Arabic literature department.

She published extensively in many regional Arabic magazines and journals from 1943 to 1980. As a women's rights activist, she regularly wrote for the Lebanese monthly magazine The Woman's Voice. She also frequently published articles in the Voice of Bahrain, Bahrain's first magazine, and this was believed to have played a role in the introduction of new social ideas in the country. Amongst her most notable works was a biography on the Lebanese-Palestinian poet May Ziadeh, who was regarded as a pioneer in Middle Eastern feminism in the early 20th century. From 1983 to 1993, she served as the editor of Al-Raida, the journal of the Lebanese American University's Institute for Women's Studies in the Arab World.

Ghorayeb received the National Cedar Medal in 1972 as well as the Lebanese Gold Medal of Achievement in 1980.

== Works ==
- Ghorayeb, Rose (December 1979). "May Ziadeh (1886–1941)". Signs: Journal of Women in Culture and Society. 5 (2): 375–382. doi:10.1086/493725.
- al-Naqd al-jamali wa atharuhu fi-l-naqd al-‘Arabi ("Aesthetic Criticism and Its Impact in Arabic Criticism"), 1952
- al-Tawahhuj wa-l-uful: Mayy Ziyada wa adabuha ("Stars Flicker and Set: Mayy Ziyada and Her Works"), 1978
- Nasamat wa a‘asir fi-l-shi‘r al-nisa’i al-‘Arabi al-mu‘asir ("Breezes and Cyclones in Contemporary Arab Women’s Poetry"), 1980
- Aswat ‘ala-l-haraka al-nisa’iya al-mu‘asira ("Voices on the Contemporary Women’s Movement"), 1988
- Aghani al-sighar ("Songs of the Young"), poetry, Beirut: Catholic Press, 1948
- Laylat al-milad ("Christmas Night"), children's literature, Beirut: Maktabat al-Mash‘al, 1957
- Khutut wa zilal ("Lines and Shadows"), short stories, Beirut: Dar al-Rayhani, 1958
- Hadiqat al-ash‘ar li-l-awlad ("The Garden of Children’s Poetry"), poetry, Beirut: Dar al-Kitab al-Lubnani, 1964
- Sunduq Umm Mahfuz ("Umm Mahfuz’s Box"), children's stories, Beirut: Bayt al-Hikma, 1970
- al-Ma‘ni al-kabir ("The Great Amir"), novel, Beirut: Bayt al-Hikma, 1971
- Nur al-nahar ("Light of Day"), short stories, Beirut: Bayt al-Hikma, 1974
- Ruwaq al-lablab ("The Ivy Curtain"), short stories, Beirut: Dar al-Fikr al-Lubnani, 1983
