= Saifi Village =

Neighborhood in Beirut, Lebanon

Coordinates: 33°53′39.46″N 35°30′29.57″E

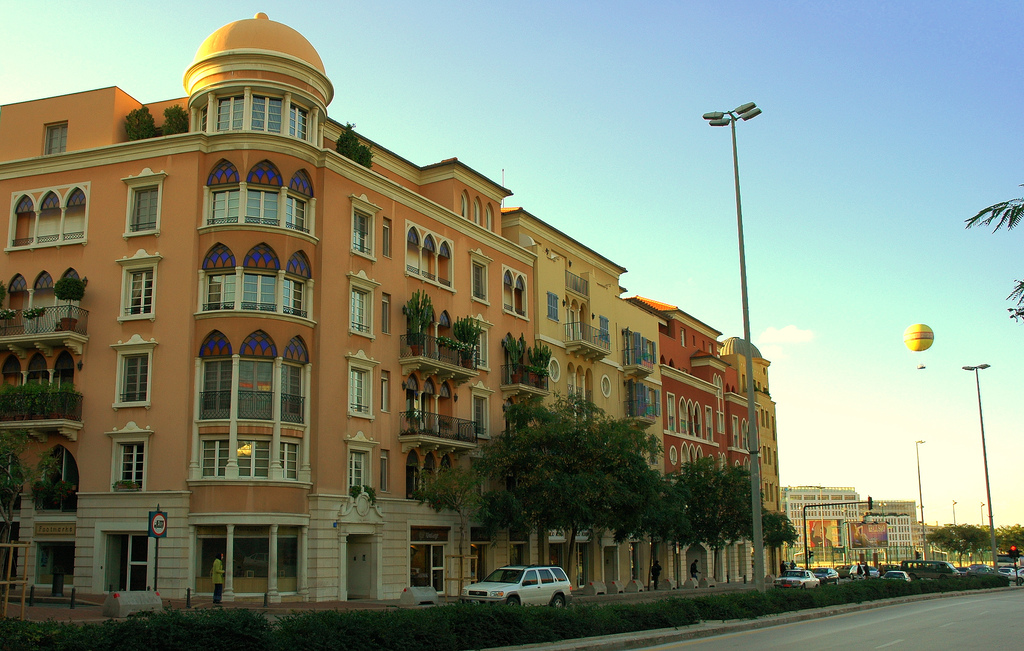
Upscale buildings in the area

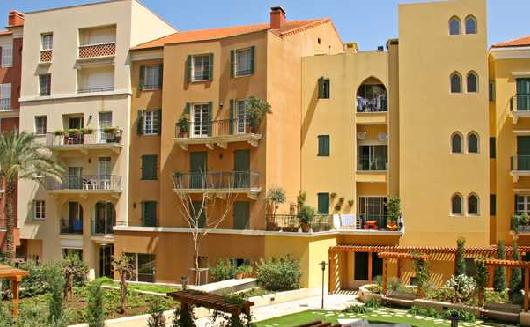
The main square of Saifi Village in Centre Ville, Beirut, Lebanon

Saifi Village is an upscale residential neighborhood in Beirut, Lebanon. Saifi Village is located at the southeastern periphery of Centre Ville. The village is bordered by Rue Charles Debbas to the south, Rue George Haddad to the east, Rue Gouraud to the north and Rue Ariss & Kanaani to the west. Its location is at the beginning of the former Green Line, which was the main frontline in Beirut during the Lebanese Civil War.

The neighborhood was completely destroyed during the Lebanese Civil War. However, private company Solidere has rebuilt the neighbourhood in a vernacular style that seeks to be somehow reminiscent of French colonial buildings. It was initially planned by French architect François Spoerry, and includes buildings by prominent Lebanese architects such as Nabil Gholam. Saifi Village is an example of a New Urbanist-style neighborhood with cobblestone streets, apartment buildings, townhouses and shops. The shops range from a combination of designer shops to car dealerships such as Ferrari. It is also the home of a few art galleries and new uprising Lebanese designer shops, including Bokja Design, Nada Debs, and Vick Vanlian Gallery. The village also includes gardens that are filled with seasonal shrubs, flowers, and trees. It is also a place for family gatherings due to the presence of children playgrounds and wooden benches and fountains for the full park experience. Extensive deployment of private security is here, however, a serious deterrent for undesired lower-income families and visitors as in other Solidere-managed development projects such as Zaytounay Bay.

Though, most recently, as of 2023, the area has seen a commercial revival in which many upper-end restaurants, coffee shops, and bars have opened. Examples of such include ROFF, Dupain, Maryool, Paname, Meat The Fish, Backburner, Malibou, Base Coffee, Vicoli, Julienne aux Vieux Quartier, BUCO, and Villa Clara.

== Demographics ==
Religion in Saifi (2014)
Religion	Percent
Christian	92.52%
Sunni Islam	3.87%
Shia Islam	1.49%
Others	2.12%

In 2014, Christians made up 92.52% and Muslims made up 5.39% of registered voters in Saifi. 30.10% of the voters were Maronite Catholics, 25.46% were Greek Catholics, 17.79% were Greek Orthodox, 5.61% were Armenian Orthodox and 5.46% were Armenian Catholics.

== Gallery ==
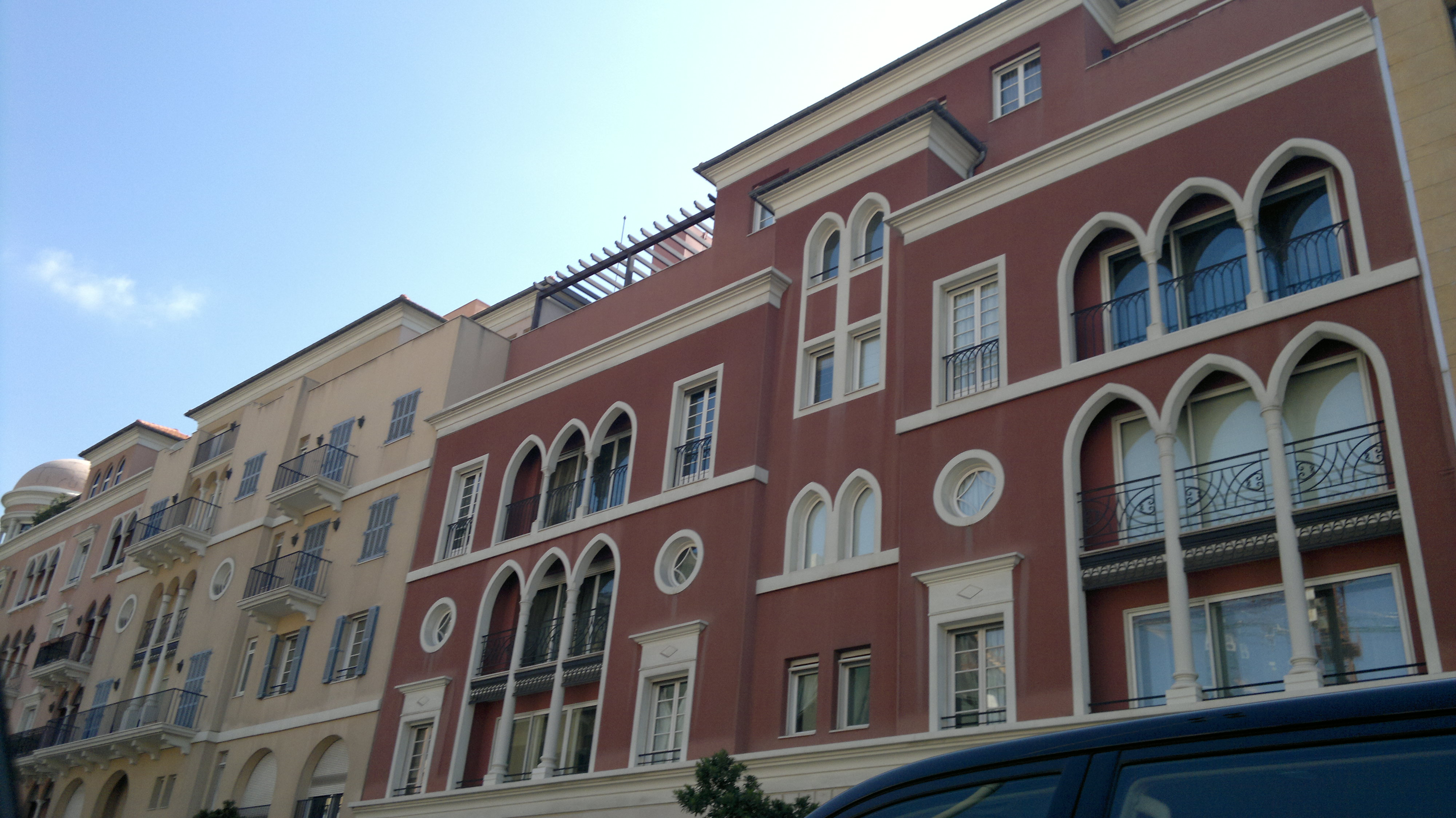

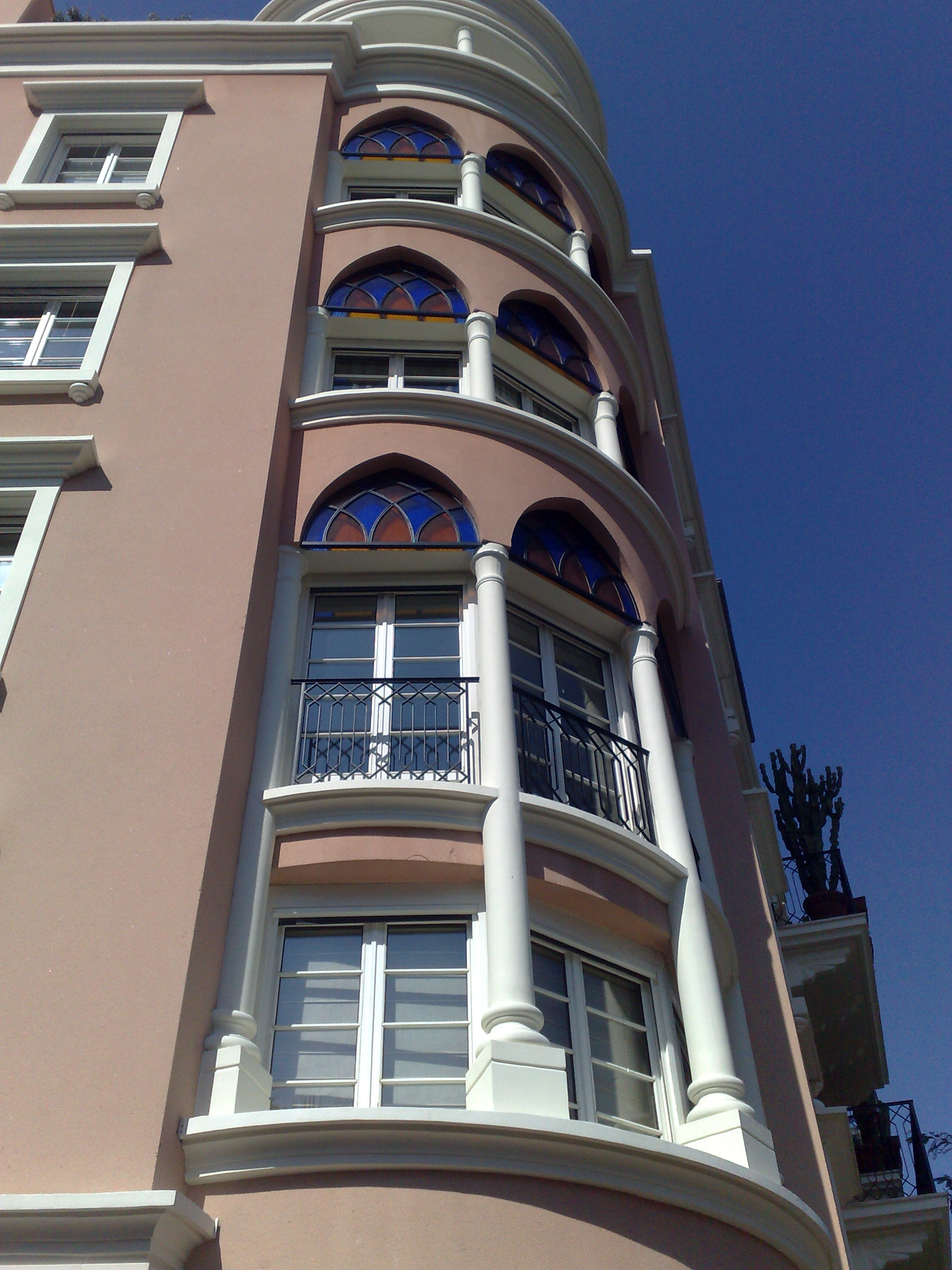

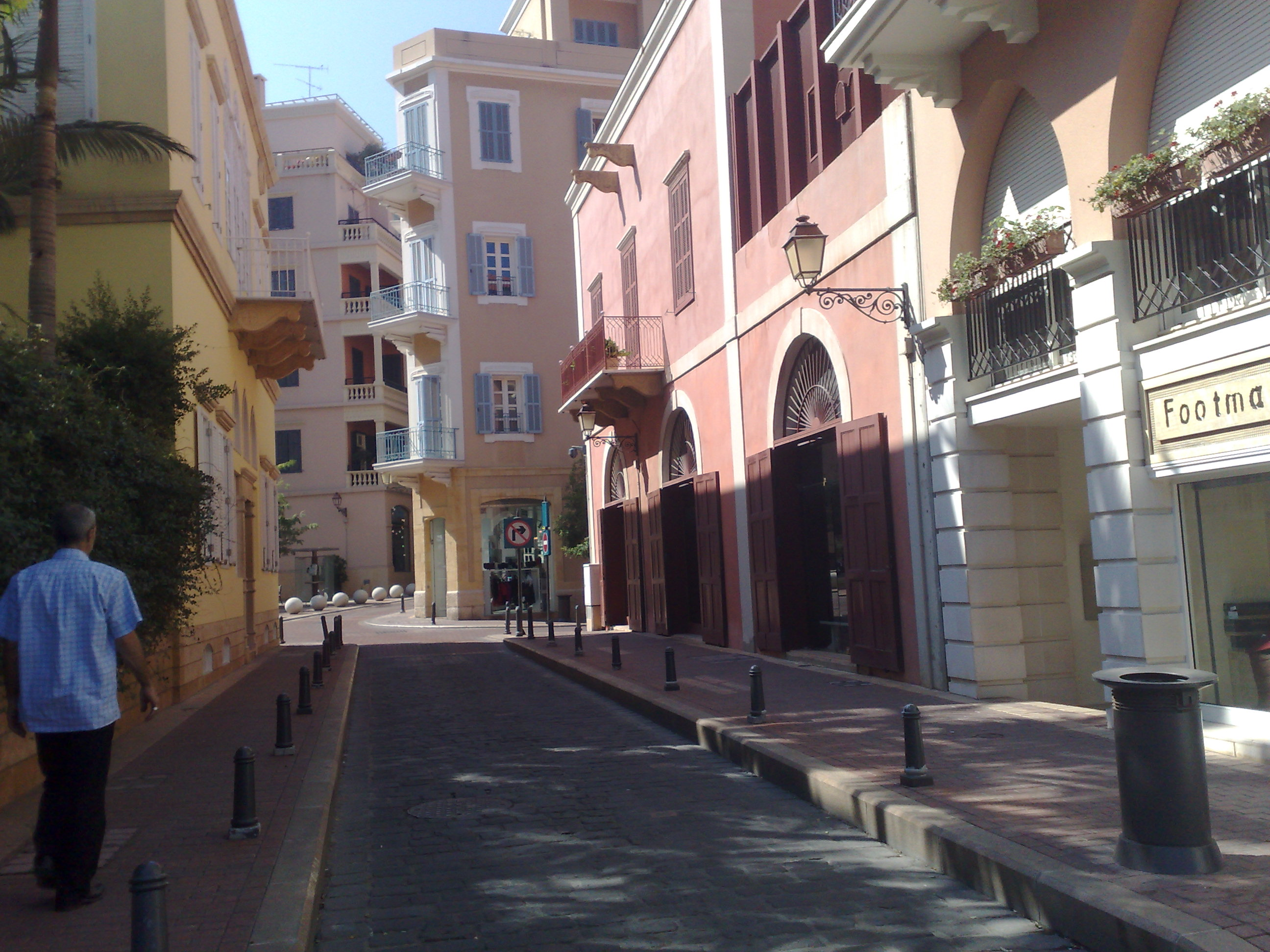
