= Nur Salman =

Lebanese writer (born 1937)

Nur Salman (born 1937) is a Lebanese writer.

She was born in Beirut and received a BA in Arabic literature from the Beirut College for Girls, a MA in comparative literature from the American University of Beirut and a state doctorate in Arabic literature from Saint Joseph University. She is a professor of Arabic literature at the Lebanese University.

Salman is a member of the board for the National Conservatory. She is also a member of the Lebanese Women's Council and the Lebanese Child Care Association.

== Selected works ==
- Fadahikat ("And She Laughed") novel (1960)
- Yabqa al-bahr wa-I-sama' ("The Sea and Sky Remain") short stories (1966)
- al-Shi'r al-suji("Sufi Poetry") literary criticism (1980)
- al-A dab al-Jaza'iri ji rihab al-rafd wa-I-tahrir ("Algerian Literature in the Broad Expanses of Rejection and Liberation") literary criticism (1981)
- al-Lughat al-Samiya wa-I-Iugha al-'Arabiya ("Semitic Languages and Arabic") non-fiction (1981)
- Madkhal ila dirasat al-shi'r al-ramzi ji-I-adab al-hadith ("Introduction to the Study of Symbolic Poetry in Modern Literature") literary criticism (1981)
- Adwa' 'ala-I-tasawwuf al-Islami ("Illuminating Sufism") non-fiction (1982)
- Ila rajullam ya 'ti ("To a Man Who Did Not Come") poetry (1986)
- al- 'Ayn al-hamra' ("The Red Eye") short stories (1991)
- Li-fajr yashuqq al-hajar ("Toward a Rocksplitting Dawn") poetry (1994)
- Lan utji' al-wajd ("I Will Not Snuff Out Love") poetry (1997)
