= Vick Vanlian =

Lebanese-Armenian designer (1977-2017)

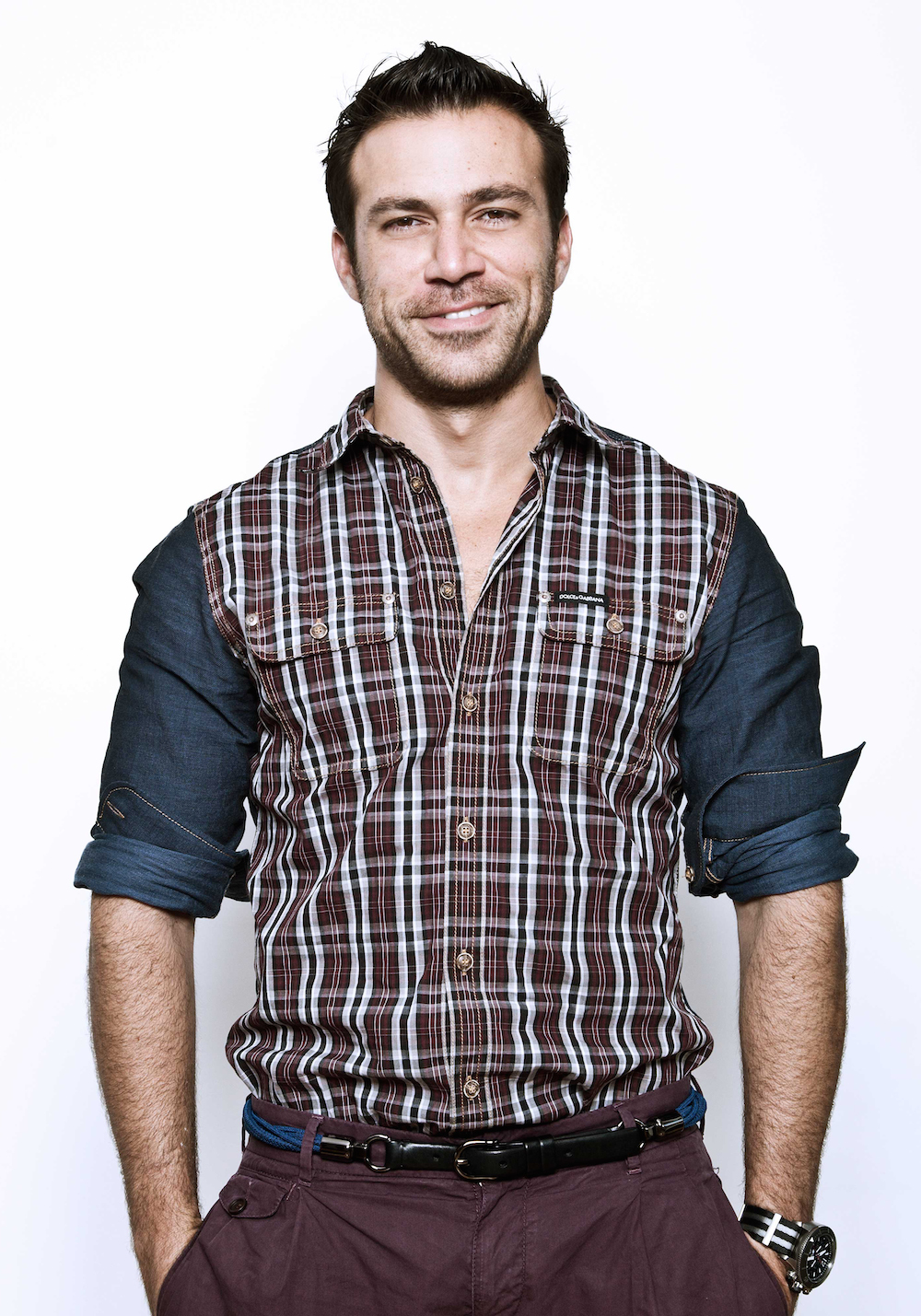
- Born: Vicken Vanlian; 1977 (age 48–49); Lebanon
- Died: September 2017; Beirut
- Education: Lebanese American University
- Known for: Furniture, Interiors, Architecture
- Website: www.vickvanlian.com

Vick Vanlian (1977 – September 2017) was a Lebanese-Armenian designer and the founder of interior design company Vick Vanlian / V World. He was famed for his upbeat personality and his quirky, boundary-pushing interior designs.

== Education ==
Vanlian graduated with high distinction in 2000 with a degree in Interior Architecture from the Lebanese American University in Beirut. During his time in university, Vanlian began working on design projects at his father's furniture shops, leading to his career in interior design.

== Design philosophy ==
Vanlian claimed that his design philosophy is “Be bold! Design without Fear”. He uses four of the five senses: touch, smell, sight and sound, which he finds to be part of experiencing a certain space, both in interiors or architecture.

Vanlian was known for his use of different materials and styles, his eccentric designs, in addition to his bold show of colours, textures and patterns materialized in a big density of decors. Materials like bike tires, pipes and pedals are some materials used in his work, along with Geometric shapes, bold pop colors and classical elements.

== Exhibitions ==
According to Harper's Bazaar Interiors, Vanlian was one of the "fastest growing names in interiors in the Middle East," showcasing in international design shows including Milan and Paris.

His first furniture collection, V World, was launched in 2012 at the Milan Furniture Fair. He now showcases a minimum of four to five items twice a year at the fair.

Vanlian also hosted various international exhibitions at Vick Vanlian Boutique, local and international artists.

== Work ==
Vanlian's first project was in his second year of university and was a chalet in the Lebanese mountains. Shortly after he graduated, he designed an 800-square-metre Jeddah palace for a member of the Saudi royal family.

Vanlian had signed interiors and special furniture for members of Royal families in the Middle East and for various Middle Eastern pop singers, including Haifa Wehbe and Ragheb Alama.

Among his other commissions, Vanlian has designed a 350.000 euro gem-set leather sofa for a Lebanese celebrity and a private sex room. In March 2017, Vick Vanlian partnered with Zuhair Murad.

== Stores ==
The family name of the Vanlian brand had been established in 1963, with Vanlian Frères and Gallerie Vanlian being the first to launch the name.

In 2004, Vanlian opened Envy Interiors, a Middle East firm in bespoke interiors for residential, business and retail clients.

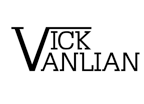
Official Logo

On September 7, 2012, Vanlian opened a 170 square-meter boutique and gallery in Saifi Village's Quartier Des Arts, where Vanlian displays and sells his experimental designs and his lifestyle collection. Launched at the Milan Furniture Fair, The Vick Vanlian brand is supported by a network of in-house architects, interior architects, concept designers and project managers. Today, Vick Vanlian is one of the Middle East's leading interior design firms known for their "daring take on design".

The boutique includes the ‘Black Room,’ a space dedicated to Vanlian's own furniture and accessories selections, created by some of the World's most recognized artists and brands.

== Influences ==
With his first savings punctuate, Vanlian bought a Salvador Dalí piece. In addition to Dalí, Takashi Murakami is one of his favorite artists, claiming that "[the Japanese artist] epitomises Japanese pop culture". French architectural designer Philippe Starck and American designers Charles and Ray Eames are among his favourite designers, Starck for his play of proportions and the Eames for being ahead of their time. He is inspired by the Louis XV era in the 16th century, the 1920s art-deco scene, the 50s, the 60s futuristic scene, and the 70s.

He also credited Pierre Cardin's avant-garde work (from the sixties and the seventies) as an inspiration to his works.

Vanlian also claimed that fashion is an inspiration to his works.

== Family ==
After fleeing the Armenian genocide, and previously wealthy, Vanlian's parents found themselves bereft of their fortunes, with Bourj Hammoud their new home. Vanlian's father began constructing beds and was very successful, later establishing Vanlian Gallery. Today, Vanlian Gallery has six branches, with the one in Dora being the largest showroom in the Middle East, covering 9000 square meters.

Born into a family of Lebanese furniture entrepreneurs, Vanlian attended his first Milan Furniture Fair at the age of ten with his father. Vanlian lived between Beirut, New York and Montreal.

== Death ==
Vick Vanlian died in Beirut on September 11, 2017, after battling cancer.
