= Brummana High School =

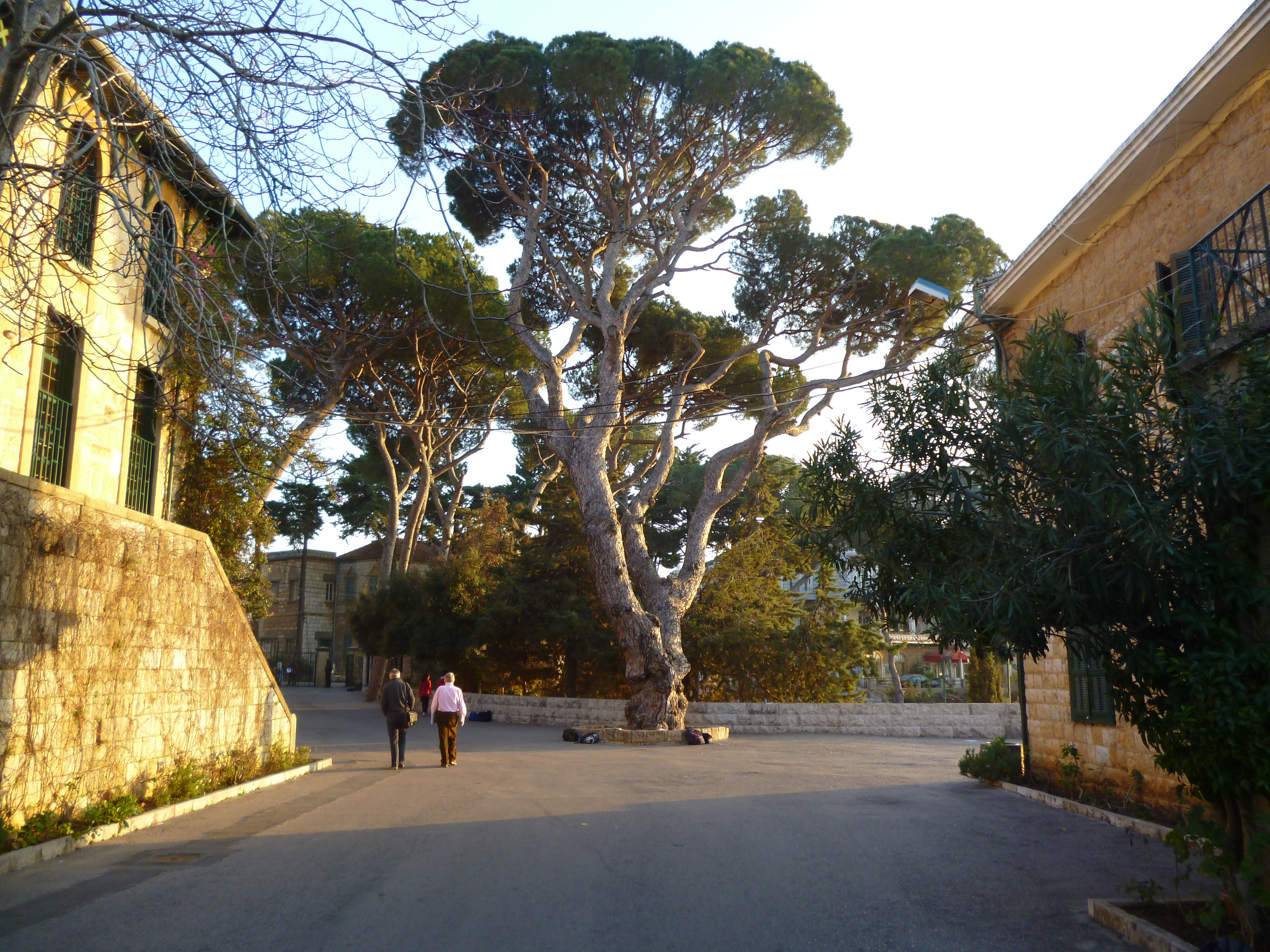

Location
- (Lebanon) Brummana; Lebanon
- Coordinates: 33°52′51″N 35°37′23″E

Information
- Type: Private
- Motto: I Serve
- Established: 1873
- Principal: David Gray
- Gender: Co-educational
- Website: Official website

Brummana High School (BHS, Arabic: مدرسة برمانا العالية) is a private school in Lebanon. It is located in the village of Brummana, situated in Metn, Mount Lebanon, 10 kilometres (6.2 mi) east of the capital city Beirut.

This school was established in 1873, by the Quaker Theophilus Waldmeier (a Swiss missionary). Historically Quakers were among the pioneers in developing a modern form of learner-centred education which prized the worth and development of the whole child and student. With other educators, Quakers recognised that schooling involved far more than academic study. Today much internationally accepted good practice in education follows these principles. BHS remains a school which aims to follow the ideals and values of its Quaker founders.

Brummana High School has been licensed and accredited by the Lebanese Ministry of Education to be a coeducational, boarding and day school for students in the classes of the infant, primary, intermediate and secondary schools in 1947.

== History ==
=== Founding (1800s) ===
Theophilus Waldmeier, a German-Swiss missionary, first came to Mount Lebanon in 1867, during the time of the Ottoman rule, and was engaged as inspector of branch schools in Beirut, the mountains, and Damascus.

Some time between 1869 and 1874, Elijah G. Saleeby opened the first school in Brummana, a remote village overlooking Beirut (three hours from Beirut on horseback), called the "Darlington Station" because it was backed with Quaker (Religious Society of Friends) subscriptions from Darlington, England.

In 1873, Theophilus Waldmeier opened a girls' school in Brummana, with money sent to him by his friends in Switzerland. Before the end of the year he was sent further money from Switzerland to open a boys' school at Brummana. Many of the buildings of Brummana date to the time period; they were made of local stone and red tile.

In 1874, Theophilus Waldmeier visited England to raise money for the school from the Society of Friends, and he himself became a Quaker. When he returned, he purchased 20,000 square yards of land called "Berket al-Ghanem" (The Pool of the Conqueror) which was a hillside of pine, fig, and mulberry trees with two fountains of water on the edge of Brummana.

The Friends' Syrian Mission (a committee of English and American Friends) approved the purchase and authorised the building of a boys' school. In this same year, Elijah G. Saleeby handed over the "Darlington Station" school to Theophilus Waldmeier.

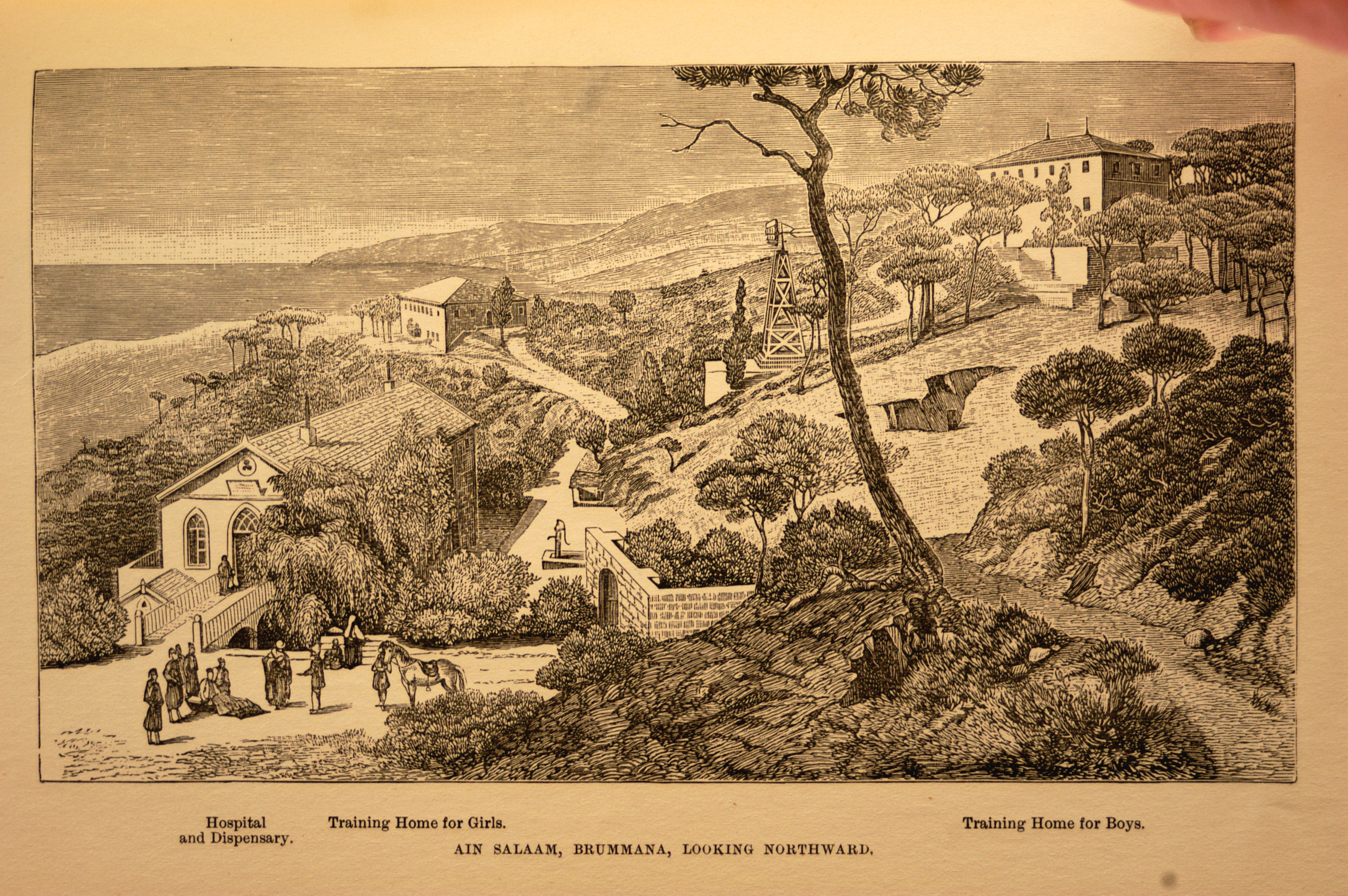
Brummana High School, circa 1886.

In 1876, the Boys' Training Home (now Brummana High School) was opened in a leased house in Brummana until the new building was ready. The land name was changed from "Berket al-Ghanem" to "Ayn al-Salam" (The Fountain of Peace). Within five years, the school had grown to 300 students, bringing literacy and new ideas to the isolated mountain area.

When in 1878 the new Boy's Training Home building came into use, it housed the only dispensary in Mount Lebanon. As the medical work increased, in 1881 alternative accommodation was found in an old silk factory which was converted into a hospital with 15 beds on the ground floor and a dispensary and outpatient accommodation in the upper storey.

In 1882, the Girls' Training Home at Brummana was opened.

Education at Brummana High School was based on the principles of the Society of Friends, which stress non-violence, equality, the spirit of service and encouragement of the pursuit of higher standards through enlightened methods.

In 1889, the village of Brummana was linked by a new carriage road down the hill to Beirut below, but many students still arrived at the school gates by foot or donkey. At the turn of the century, BHS built the first tennis court in the Middle East.

=== Boys' High School (1900s) ===
By 1902, the Boys' Training Home had adopted the name Boys' High School. During that year, BHS became co-educational. It was one of the few fully co-educational schools.

When in 1914 World War I began, the Ottomans took over the school hospital and occupied the school buildings which were not re-opened until 1919. Despite the famine relief operation set up in the school's kitchens, approximately 400 out of 2000 Brummana villagers died in the great famine of 1915-18 (compared to 50% of the population of Lebanon).

After the war, Lebanon was put under French mandate, and two decades of peace and prosperity followed. In 1928, new classrooms were constructed, in 1930, a new hospital pavilion to accommodate 36 beds was completed, and in 1936, the BHS Old Scholars Association was set up.

In 1920 Farideh Arkle joined the staff. Born in 1882 she had attended the school and later taught in several Missionary schools, including one in Damascus. She retired in 1942 having become head of the Elementary School. A Quaker she continued to run the school’s Sunday School. In the 1960’s the British Media discovered that in 1909-1910 she had taught T. E. Lawrence Arabic and had corresponded with him until his death.

World War II began in 1939, and when Hitler occupied France in 1940, Lebanon came under the Vichy Government, until the Allies freed it in 1941. The Second World War seriously affected the life of the school. The French followed by the British took over the school hospital. The British made the school their military headquarters for a year. Despite the war, the school stayed open with 22 boarders and 100 day students.

=== Post-war growth (1943–1974) ===
Lebanon became independent in 1943, and during the peace of the next three decades, the school's reputation for excellence and friendly diversity became known throughout the entire region. BHS grew to 750 students, nearly half of them boarders. The school pursued a balanced program for mind and bodies and this culminated in the following:

- 1950 – A new swimming pool
- 1952 – A new Primary block
- 1953 – The first international tennis tournament
- 1960 – A new craft block for woodwork and metal work
- 1967 – A new boarding house opened by Prince Philip, Duke of Edinburgh
- 1971 – A new health centre – Clare House
- 1973 – New science labs

Around the 1960s and 1970s the school's curriculum was mainly in the English language. The school's athletics programme placed emphasis on basketball, volleyball, track, and tennis. The students consisted of Arab and children of Western expatriates from across the Middle East, with members of the Bahraini, Jordanian, UAE and Saudi royal families, with a small smattering of American and British nationals. The parents of the America and European students worked in Lebanon. Many of the students went on to the American University of Beirut for their further studies.

=== Recent years (1975–2025) ===
In 1975, when war once again overtook Lebanon, this period of growth ended and the school lost many of its boarders, staff, and day students. In 1985, the Society of Friends totally withdrew from the School operation and handed the responsibilities to the Brummana High School Cultural Society, composed of old B.H.S. former students. For the next thirteen years the B.H.S.-C.S. was responsible for the School. In 1998, at the request of the parents, staff, and old scholars, the British Quakers resumed management of the school, working through a new local Board to begin the process of post-war development.

In 1999, the school commissioned a major educational study as the basis for a five-year development plan. The Science Block was extended to three floors, and the Science Block and Upper School Computer Laboratory were completely refurbished and fully re-equipped. In 2004, Rizkhallah House was fully refurbished to house the Infant Section and the Main Teaching Block roof was replaced. Thanks to the generous donations of old scholars, parents, and friends of the school, the process of renewal is continuing.

In October 2022, enrollment was around 1,000 students in kindergarten to 12th grade. David Gray served as principle, and had since 2019. Along with the co-ed Ramallah Friends School, BHS was one of two Quaker-run schools in the Middle East. In November 2024, the principal wrote that since the beginning September, they had lost eight school days to conflict. The school had 1270 students. In 2025, according to its website, the school had Lebanese Baccalaureate, Cambridge IGCSEs and International Baccalaureate (IBDP) programs on a 16-acre campus.

== Scouts ==
Brummana High School houses one of the oldest Scouts groups in Lebanon, Brummana One Group, or Br1, founded in 1952. Br1's mission is to contribute to the education of young people based on non-formal education.

== Notable alumni ==
- Haitham bin Tariq, the Sultan of Oman.
- Sharif Ali bin al-Hussein, leader of the Iraqi Constitutional Monarchy political party.
- Idris bin Abdullah al-Senussi, member of the Libyan royal family and a leader of the Sanussiyyah movement.
- Khaled Juffali, Saudi businessman.
- Émile Lahoud, former President of Lebanon (1998-2007).
- Omar Maani, Mayor of Amman, Jordan from 2006 to 2011.
- Salwa Nassar, physicist.
- Tammam Salam, former Lebanese Prime Minister (2014-2016).
- Dom Joly, English Comedian and writer.

== See also ==
- Education in the Ottoman Empire
- List of Friends schools
- List of international schools
- List of schools in the Ottoman Empire
- The Schools Index

== Bibliography ==
- Coll, Steve (2008). The Bin Ladens: An Arabian Family in the American Century. New York City: The Penguin Press. ISBN 978-1-59420-164-6.
- Greenwood, John Ormerod. Quaker Encounters. Volume 3. Whispers of Truth. York: Joseph Rowntree Charitable Trust 1978.
- Turtle, H.J. (1975). Quaker Service in the Middle East with a history of Brummana High School. 1876-1975. London: Friends Service Council 1975.
- Waldmeier, Theophilus. The autobiography of Theophilus Waldmeier, missionary: being ten years' life in Abyssinia; and sixteen years in Syria. London: The Orphans’ Printing Press 1886.
