= University of New Mexico–Gallup =

Community college in Gallup, New Mexico, US

- Established: 1968
- Chancellor: John Zimmerman (interim)
- Location: Gallup, New Mexico, US; 35°30′08″N 108°43′34″W
- Website: www.gallup.unm.edu

The University of New Mexico–Gallup is a branch campus of the University of New Mexico in Gallup, New Mexico, United States. It serves approximately 2,200 students, 94% of which identify as multiethnic or as a racial minorities, making it a minority-majority university. It offers 12 disciplines and 18 associate degrees.

The current chancellor is John Zimmerman, who is serving in an interim capacity.

== History ==
UNM–Gallup was founded in 1968. In 1969, the Lions Hall was donated to the university by the local Lions Club. The first official building of the university, it was remodeled to accommodate administration and classrooms, which had been previously hosted in the old Gallup High School building. The building was demolished in 2024.

In 2016, the Executive Director of UNM–Gallup, Christopher Dyer, received criticism for organizing a two-day conference on campus regarding the hunt for Bigfoot. The conference cost the public around US$7,000, which Dyer himself declared a "waste of money" as they could not find evidence due to the presence of snow.

In 2023, UNM–Gallup partnered with Gallup-McKinley County Schools to offer daycare services for school teacher and administrators as well as students.

== Arts ==
UNM–Gallup has also hosted opera performers from the University of New Mexico main campus.
