= University of New Mexico–Valencia =

Community college in Los Lunas, New Mexico, US

- Established: 1978
- Chancellor: Laura Musselwhite (interim)
- Location: 34°43′44″N 106°42′18″W
- Website: valencia.unm.edu

The University of New Mexico–Valencia is a branch campus of the University of New Mexico in Los Lunas, New Mexico, United States.

The current chancellor is Laura Musselwhite, who is serving in an interim capacity after Samuel Dosumu stepped down in March 2026. Dosumu had succeeded Alice Letteney, who had been a part of the university for 27 years.

== History ==
UNM–Valencia was founded in August 1978 as the University of New Mexico–Eastern Valencia County Satellite Center. In 1979, the State Legislative Finance Committee suggested the expansion of the center, which was accepted by the University of New Mexico in March 1981, formally beginning classes in August.

Since its founding, the college has expanded to include additional classrooms, a library, and a wellness center.

== Campus ==
UNM–Valencia has installed solar panels throughout the campus in an effort to reduce their carbon footprint and electricity bills. The campus stated their goal was to have 60% to 70% of campus electricity to come from renewables by the end of 2019. The campus has also hosted other environmentalist events.
