= Saniya Habboub =

Lebanese physician (1901–1983)

Saniya Habboub

Saniya M. Habboub (first name is also seen as Saniyeh, Sania, or Saniyya) (Arabic: سنية حبوب; 1901 — September 1983) was a Lebanese medical doctor. She was the first Lebanese woman to study medicine abroad and to graduate from the Woman's Medical College of Pennsylvania, where she earned her medical degree in 1931. Later she worked with the Lebanese Red Cross.

== Early life ==
Habboub was born in Beirut, to a Muslim family, the daughter of Moustafa Habboub, a Lebanese leather merchant, and his wife Adla al-Jazairy. Her mother was illiterate, but admired educated women, and insisted on Saniya's schooling as a priority. Saniya Habboub attended the American Junior College for Women and the American University of Beirut (AUB). Because women were not admitted to AUB's medical program at the time, she decided to pursue a medical degree in the United States instead, the first Lebanese woman to do so. "Her hair is bobbed", marveled one American newspaper writer, "and in every way she has adopted occidental ways".

Habboub finished medical school at the Woman's Medical College of Pennsylvania in 1931, the school's only Arab graduate. She stayed in the United States into 1932, for further training as an intern in gynecology and obstetrics. She endowed a scholarship at the Woman's Medical College of Pennsylvania in gratitude for the education she received there.

== Career ==
Habboub returned to Lebanon in 1932, and opened a small clinic with free services for women who could not afford her fee; she was the first woman physician trained abroad to open a practice in Beirut. Later, she worked with the Lebanese Red Cross. She worked with the Muslim Orphans' Home and the Young Women's Muslim Association, and received a "Health Medal of Merit" in 1982 from the Lebanese government to mark her fiftieth year as a medical doctor.

== Personal life ==
Habboub married Muhammad al-Naqqash, a journalist. They had two daughters. She died in 1983, aged 82 years. There is a Sania Habboub Street in the Ramlet al-Baida section of Beirut, named in her memory.
