= Garnett S. Stokes =

American academic administrator (born 1955)

Garnett Stokes

23rd President of the University of New Mexico
- In office March 1, 2018 – June 30, 2026
- Preceded by: Chaouki Abdallah
- Succeeded by: Steve Goldstein

Interim President of Florida State University
- In office February 17, 2014 – November 10, 2014
- Preceded by: Eric J. Barron
- Succeeded by: John E. Thrasher

Personal details
- Born: December 20, 1955 (age 70) Washington, D.C., U.S.
- Education: Carson-Newman University (BA); University of Georgia (MS, PhD)

Garnett Sue Stokes (born December 20, 1955) is an American academic administrator who served as the 23rd president of the University of New Mexico. She held the office from March 1, 2018 to June 30, 2026.

== Early life and education ==
Stokes was born in Washington, D.C. She earned a Bachelor of Arts degree in psychology from Carson–Newman University, followed by a Master of Science and a Ph.D. in industrial and organizational psychology from the University of Georgia.

== Career ==
Stokes served as a professor in the psychology department at the University of Georgia from 1985 until 2011, rising from assistant professor to professor. She chaired the Department of Psychology from 1999 to 2004. She served as dean of Franklin College of Arts and Sciences from 2004 until 2011.

Stokes served as the provost for Florida State University from August 2011 to January 2015. From February to November 2014, she served as the university's interim president.

Stokes served as the provost and executive vice chancellor for academic affairs at the University of Missouri from February 2015 to January 2018. She briefly served as interim chancellor in 2015.

Stokes was named the 23rd president of University of New Mexico on November 2, 2017, making her the first female president of the university.
