= Al-Raida =

- Discipline: Gender studies
- Language: Arabic, English

Publication details
- History: 1976–present
- Publisher: The Arab Institute for Women
- Frequency: Bi-annual

Standard abbreviations
- ISO 4: Al-Raida

Indexing
- ISSN: 0259-9953 (print); 2226-4841 (web)

Links
- Journal homepage

Al-Raida (English: The Woman Pioneer) is a bi-annual peer-reviewed feminist academic journal covering women's and gender studies. Established in 1976, it is published by The Arab Institute for Women at the Lebanese American University. Its mission is to "enhance networking between Arab women and women all over the world".

== History ==
The Institute for Women's Studies in the Arab World was set up in 1973 at the Beirut University College, with funding from the Ford Foundation. This later morphed under the Lebanese American University. As the college was founded by Christian American missionaries, the journal was exclusively published in English for much of its history until the fall-winter edition of 2001 when an Arabic edition was published. Al-Raida published special issues on women in Arab cinema, women and the Lebanese Civil War, women and work, and violence against women. In 2013, the journal began publishing on a bi-annual basis as an interdisciplinary peer-reviewed academic journal, containing both scholarly and non-academic articles. In 2017, all journal content was digitized and made available online.

== Reception ==
Al-Raida has been described as one of Lebanon's most successful feminist journals, recovering "a part of Lebanese feminist history that has been largely ignored".

== Notable editors ==
- Rose Ghurayeb
