= Lebanese American University =

American university based in Lebanon

- الجامعة اللبنانية الأميركية
- Former names: American Junior College for Women; Beirut College for Women; Beirut University College
- Motto: To strive, to seek, to find, and not to yield
- Type: Private university
- Established: 1924; 102 years ago (post-secondary junior college)
- Endowment: $696.3 million (2025)
- President: Chaouki Abdallah
- Provost: George Nasr
- Administrative staff: 318 full-time and 526 part-time faculty; 637 full-time and 188 part-time staff (fall 2017)
- Students: 9,084 (7,809 undergraduate, 1000 graduate, 275 doctoral-professional) (fall 2024)
- Location: Lebanon
- Campus: Beirut
- Language: English
- Other campuses: Byblos; New York
- Colours: Green • White
- Website: www.lau.edu.lb

The Lebanese American University (LAU; Arabic: الجامعة اللبنانية الأميركية) is a secular private American university with campuses in Beirut, Byblos, and New York. It is chartered by the board of regents of the University of the State of New York and is recognized by the Lebanese Ministry of Education and Higher Education. It is accredited by the New England Commission of Higher Education (NECHE). It offers 34 bachelor's degree programs and 26 master's degree programs in addition to Pharm.D. and M.D. degrees.

== Campuses ==
LAU has two main campuses, one located in Beirut and another located in the city of Byblos, 35 kilometres (22 mi) north of Beirut. LAU also has a small branch campus in New York, NY.

The Byblos campus, inaugurated in 1987, hosts the nursing, medicine, engineering, and pharmacy programs, while most of the other programs are offered in both campuses. LAU's Beirut and Byblos campuses are respectively 2.75 hectares (6.8 acres) and 31.76 hectares (78.5 acres).

LAU also operates two teaching hospitals in Lebanon. The LAU Medical Center-Rizk Hospital (LAUMC-RH), acquired in 2009 and located in Ashrafieh, Beirut, houses the only comprehensive stroke center in Lebanon. LAU Medical Center-Saint John’s Hospital, located in Jounieh, was inaugurated in 2021 and serves the Jounieh–Byblos area.

In March 2024, the university’s New York academic center was converted into a degree-granting campus.

== Accreditations, affiliations, and charters ==
The Lebanese American University is chartered by the Board of Regents of the University of the State of New York. It is accredited by the New England Commission of Higher Education.

Some of its programs are also accredited:

Accreditor	Programs
ACCP	PharmD
ABET	BE in Civil, Computer, Electrical, Industrial, and Mechanical Engineering; BS in Computer Science
Federation of Arab Engineers	BE in Civil, Computer, Electrical, Industrial, and Mechanical Engineering
CCNE	BS in Nursing
AACSB	BS in Business Studies, Economics, Business with emphasis in Hospitality and Tourism Management; Minors in Business, Data Analytics, Economics, and Hospitality and Tourism Management; Master of Business Administration (MBA), MBA in Business Analytics (online), Executive Master of Business Administration (EMBA), MBA in Global Business Administration (online), MA in Applied Economics, LLM in Business Law, Master of Studies in Law, MS in Human Resources Management, MBA in Healthcare Management (online), and MS in Data Analytics
ACPHA	BS in Hospitality and Tourism Management
ACEND	Combined program in nutrition and dietetics (BS in Nutrition and Dietetics Coordinated Program and MS in Nutrition)
TEPDAD	Doctor of Medicine
NASAD	BFA in Studio Arts, Interior Design, Graphic Design, Fashion Design; MA in Islamic Art
NAAB	Bachelor of Architecture; The Bachelor of Architecture is officially recognized as equivalent to the Diplôme d’Etat d’Architecte (DEA) by the Ministry of Culture in France.

== Schools ==
LAU has seven schools divided into several departments.

- School of Arts and Sciences
- School of Architecture and Design
- Adnan Kassar School of Business
- School of Engineering
- Gilbert and Rose-Marie Chagoury School of Medicine
- Alice Ramez Chagoury School of Nursing
- School of Pharmacy

== Rankings ==
University rankings

Global – Overall
- ARWU World: 501-600 (2024)
- QS World: =535 (2026)
- THE World: 251-300 (2025)
- USNWR Global: 761 (2024–25)

National – Overall
- ARWU National: 1 (2024)
- QS National: 4 (2025)
- THE National: 1 (2025)
- USNWR National: 2 (2024–25)

The university was ranked #251–300 in the Times Higher Education (THE) 2025 Rankings, tying it as the 5th highest ranked university in the Arab World. It was also ranked #12 in the THE Arab University Rankings 2024. LAU received a score of 91.4 in the research quality indicator. Its business and economics programs were also ranked within the #251–300 range.

In the 2024 Academic Ranking of World Universities (ARWU), LAU was placed in the #501–600 bracket globally and 8th in the Arab World. The university’s Finance program was ranked #151–200, while both Business Administration and Economics were placed in the #301–400 bracket. Additionally, the university was ranked #101–150 in Telecommunications Engineering; #201–300 in both Electrical/Electronic Engineering and Energy Science/Engineering; and #101–150 in Transportation Science and Technology.

In the THE World University Rankings by Subject, LAU ranked #101–125 in Business and Economics and #126–150 in Computer Science, while securing positions #201–250 in Engineering and Physical Sciences. Additionally, it was ranked #251–300 in Medical and Health Sciences and Social Sciences. In the QS World University Rankings by Subject, it was ranked #401–450 for Electrical Engineering and #351-400 for Business. According to U.S. News & World Report, the university’s engineering program was ranked 585th globally.

== Student life ==
=== Play Productions ===
The university has three theaters: the Gulbenkian Theater and the Irwin Hall in Beirut, and Selina Korban in Byblos. Student productions are required of certain majors and are presented throughout the academic year. The university also offers two major productions, one in the fall and one in the spring, and an annual international theater festival that attracts groups from other Middle Eastern universities.

=== Varsity Sports ===
Basketball, football, handball, volleyball, tennis, table tennis, swimming, and rugby teams participate in various local, regional and international collegiate tournaments.

=== Student Governance ===
Students can participate in the decision-making process by voting and running in elections for the Campus Student Councils and the University Student Council, as well as the Graduate Student Committees.

== Libraries ==
LAU has one library in Beirut (Riyad Nassar Library) and two in Byblos (Joseph G. Jabbra Library and Health Sciences library). The New York campus also has its own library.

The Riyad Nassar Library in Beirut has 419,010 print books and 725,850 e-books. It also hosts special collections related to women’s studies, education, Islamic art, and architecture, as well as children’s books.

The Joseph G. Jabbra Library in Byblos, inaugurated in November 2018, is home to thousands of books and records and houses study rooms and library equipment.

== The Arab Institute for Women (AiW) ==
In 1973, LAU established the Arab Institute for Women (AiW), previously known as the Institute for Women’s Studies in the Arab World (IWSAW), with a mission to promote women’s empowerment and gender equality in, and for, the Arab world. The institute works on five key areas: education, research, development projects, outreach, and LAU engagement.

== People ==
=== Presidents ===
- Frances Irwin 1924 – 1935
- Winifred Shannon 1935 – 1937
- William A. Stoltzfus 1937 – 1958
- James H. Nicol 1941 – 1943
- Rhoda Orme 1954 – 1955
- Grace Loucks Elliot 1958 – 1959
- Frances M. Gray 1959 – 1965
- Salwa Nassar 1965 – 1967
- Cornellius B. Houk 1967
- Marie Sabri 1967 – 1969
- William H. Schechter 1969 – 1973
- Albert Y. Badre 1973 – 1982
- Riyad F. Nassar 1982 – 2004
- Joseph G. Jabbra 2004 – 2020
- Michel Mawad (2020 - 2024)
- Chaouki Abdallah (2024 - )

=== Alumni ===
==== Alumni chapters ====
LAU has over 54,000 alumni and 44 chapters around the world.

==== Notable alumni ====
- Lamis Mustafa Alami, Minister of Education in the Palestinian Authority
- Joseph Aoun, commander of the Lebanese Armed Forces, President of Lebanon
- Wael Arakji, basketball player
- Wijdan Ali, art historian, educator, author, diplomat
- Rola Bahnam, architect and TV presenter
- Mario Bassil, actor
- Saloua Raouda Choucair, Lebanese painter and sculptor
- Sethrida Geagea, member of the Lebanese Parliament
- Rose Ghurayeb, Lebanese writer and professor of Arabic literature
- Saniya Habboub, first Lebanese woman to study medicine abroad
- Mona Hatoum, British-Palestinian multimedia and installation artist
- Alain Hakim, former Lebanese minister of economy and trade
- Rima Karaki, TV journalist and presenter
- Toufic Kreidieh, founding partner and CEO of Brands for Less
- Jomana Karadsheh, CNN International Correspondent
- Lina Khoury, director
- Anissa Rawda Najjar, Lebanese feminist and women’s right activist
- Toufic Jaber, Lebanon ambassador to Serbia, Macedonia, Montenegro, Bosnia, Croatia, Slovenia, and Kosovo
- Ricardo Karam, Lebanese television presenter and producer
- Zaven Kouyoumdjian, Lebanese talk show host, television personality, media consultant, and author
- Rima Maktabi, TV journalist and presenter
- Emily Nasrallah, Lebanese novelist
- Salwa Nassar, nuclear physicist
- Octavia Nasr, journalist
- Nadine Wilson Njeim, Miss Lebanon 2007, actress, and TV presenter
- Nur Salman, academic, activist and author
- Tania Saleh, Lebanese singer-songwriter and visual artist
- Fatima Sharafeddine, children’s books author
- Selim El Sayegh, former Lebanese minister of social affairs
- Mounira Solh, founder of Al Amal Institute for the Disabled and one of the first Lebanese women running for parliament
- Vick Vanlian, founder of interior design company Vick Vanlian / V World SAL

== See also ==
- List of American universities and colleges outside the United States
