= University of New Mexico =

Public university in Albuquerque, New Mexico, U.S.

Coordinates: 35.08389°N 106.61861°W

- Motto: Lux Hominum Vita (Latin)
- Motto in English: "Light the Life of Man"
- Type: Public research university
- Established: February 28, 1889; 137 years ago
- Accreditation: HLC
- Academic affiliations: ORAU; URA; USU; Space-grant
- Endowment: $887 million (2025)
- President: Steve A. N. Goldstein
- Students: 25,441 (fall 2021)
- Undergraduates: 19,010 (fall 2021)
- Postgraduates: 6,431 (fall 2021)
- Location: Albuquerque, New Mexico, United States
- Campus: 769 acres (3.11 km^{2}); Large city
- Other campuses: Gallup; Los Alamos; Rio Rancho; Taos; Los Lunas
- Newspaper: Daily Lobo
- Colors: Cherry and silver
- Nickname: Lobos
- Sporting affiliations: NCAA Division I FBS – Mountain West
- Mascot: Lobo Louie & Lobo Lucy
- Website: www.unm.edu

The University of New Mexico (UNM; Spanish: Universidad de Nuevo México) is a public research university in Albuquerque, New Mexico, United States. Founded in 1889 by the New Mexico Territorial Legislature, it is the state's second oldest university, the flagship university of the state, and the largest by enrollment, with 22,630 students in 2023.

UNM comprises twelve colleges and schools, including a medical school and the only law school in New Mexico. It offers 215 degree and certificate programs, including 94 baccalaureate, 71 master, and 37 doctoral degree programs. The main campus spans 800 acres (320 ha) in central Albuquerque, with branch campuses in Gallup, Los Alamos, Rio Rancho, Taos, and Los Lunas.

UNM is classified among "R1: Doctoral Universities - Very high research activity". According to the National Science Foundation, it spent over $243 million on research and development in 2021, ranking 103rd in the U.S. UNM is classified as a Hispanic-Serving Institution (HSI) by the U.S. Department of Education, with nearly half its students being Hispanic.

UNM's 16 varsity sports programs, known as the Lobos, compete in NCAA Division I (FBS for football) and are members of the Mountain West Conference; the school has won national championships in skiing and cross country running. UNM's official colors are cherry and silver. The school has approximately 200,000 alumni worldwide.

== History ==
=== Founding ===
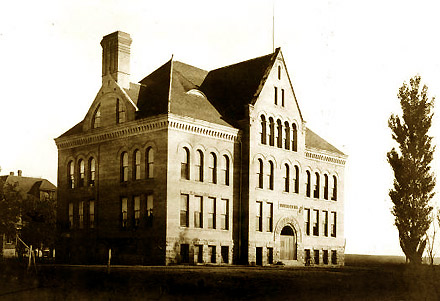
Hodgin Hall, the first building on campus. The facade has changed, and the building is now used by the Alumni Association.

The University of New Mexico was founded on February 28, 1889, with the passage of House Bill No. 186 by the Legislative Assembly of the Territory of New Mexico, which stipulated that:

Said institution is hereby located at or near the town of Albuquerque, in the county of Bernalillo within two miles north of railroad avenue in said town, upon a tract of good high and dry land, of not less than twenty acres suitable for the purposes of such institution.

The act also provided that UNM was "intended to be the state University when New Mexico shall [be] admitted as a state into the Union". Bernard Shandon Rodey, a judge of the territory of New Mexico, pushed for Albuquerque as the location of the university and was one of the authors of the statute that created UNM, earning him the title of "Father of the University". Two years later, Elias S. Stover became the first president of the University and the following year the university's first building, Hodgin Hall, opened.

=== Early growth ===
William Tight

The third president of UNM, William G. Tight, who served from 1901 to 1909, introduced many programs for students and faculty, including the first fraternity and sorority. Tight introduced the Pueblo Revival architecture for which the campus has become known. During Tight's term, the first Pueblo Revival style building on campus, the Estufa, was constructed, and the Victorian-style Hodgin Hall was plastered over to create a monument to Pueblo Indian culture. However, Tight was vilified for his primitivism and was removed from office for political reasons, though history would vindicate him as the Pueblo Revival style became the dominant architectural style on campus.

Under David Ross Boyd, the university's fifth president, the campus was enlarged from 20 to 300 acres (1.2 km^{2}) and a 200,000-acre (810 km^{2}) federal land grant was made to the university. In 1922, the university was accredited by the North Central Association of Colleges and Schools. During this time, more facilities were constructed for the university, but it was under the tenure of James F. Zimmerman, the university's seventh president, that the university underwent its first major expansion. Under Zimmerman, many new buildings were constructed, student enrollment increased, new departments were added, and greater support was generated for scientific research. Among the new buildings constructed were Zimmerman Library, Scholes Hall, the first student union building (now the anthropology complex), the university's first gymnasium and its first stadium. John Gaw Meem, an architect based in Santa Fe, was contracted to design many of the buildings constructed during this period and is credited with imbuing the campus with its distinctive Pueblo Revival style.

=== World War II and beyond ===
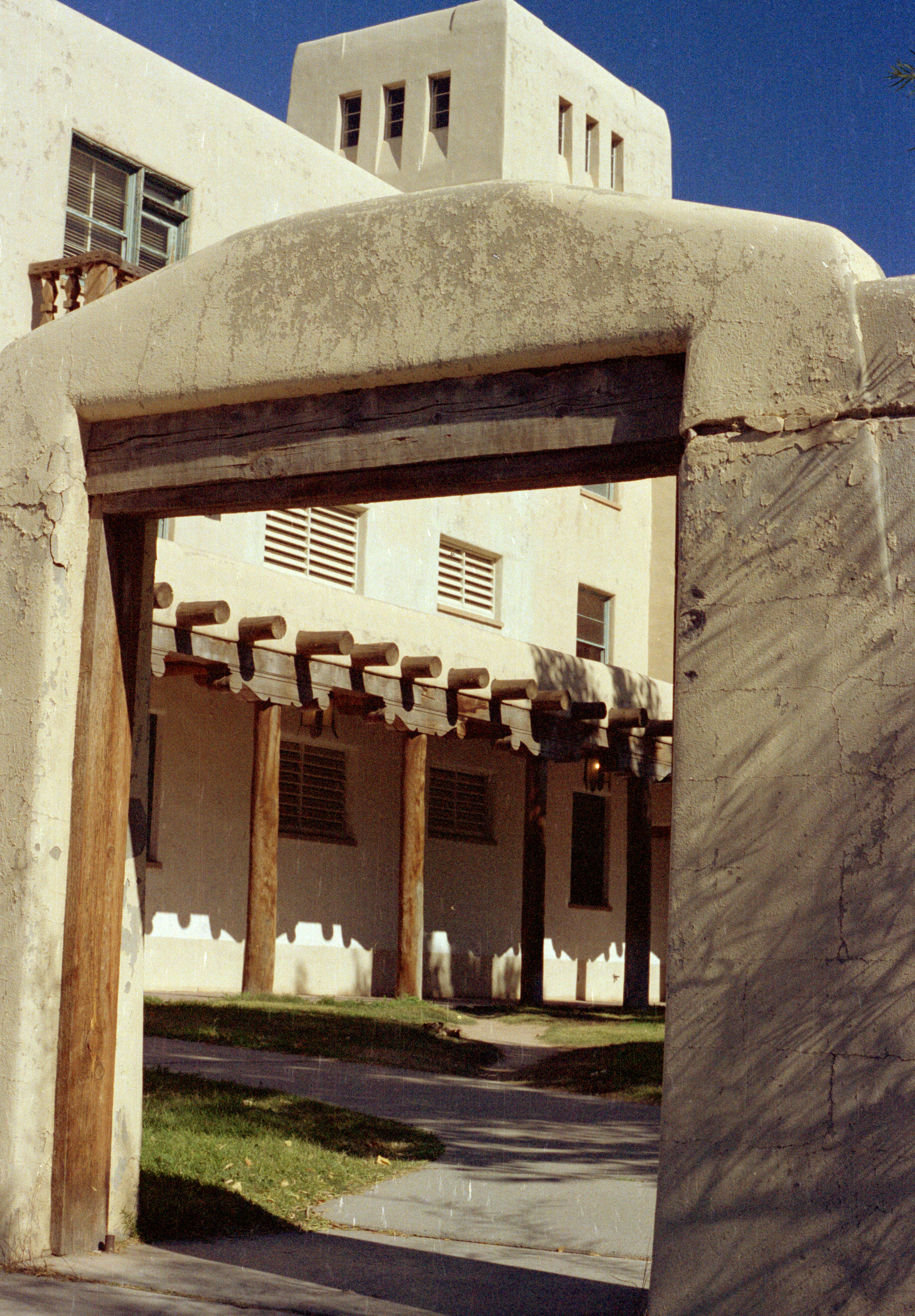
Mesa Vista Hall

During World War II, UNM was one of 131 U.S. colleges and universities that took part in the V-12 Navy College Training Program, which offered students a path to a Navy commission.

In 1945, the university hired John Philip Wernette to be its eighth president. Upon arrival, Wernette focused on improving the university's faculty, programs, and services. He instituted an eighteen-point program of procedures for the selection of new faculty and appointed a committee to ensure better teaching candidates for faculty members. He also developed a program for faculty advancement. Offices of the General Placement Bureau, Veterans Assistance, and Testing and Counseling Services were formed to assist students and Wernette required all seniors in 1946 to take the Graduate Record Examinations test to provide the school with a measurement of how well it was educating its students. The university started the Law School and School of Business Administration during his tenure.

In 1947, Wernette came into conflict with the Board of Regents over the hiring of two faculty members he thought were unqualified. His contract was not renewed by the Board the following year. Thomas L. Popejoy was appointed in 1948 as Wernette's successor, being the first native New Mexican to serve as university president. Holding his position for the next twenty years, Popejoy presided over a period major growth for the university. During this time, enrollment jumped from nearly 5,000 to more than 14,000; new programs such as medicine, nursing, dental, and law were founded; and numerous new facilities were constructed, including Mesa Vista Hall, Mitchell Hall, Johnson Gymnasium, new dormitories, the current student union building, the College of Education complex, the business center, the engineering complex, the Fine Arts Center, the Student Health Center, University Stadium, University Arena (now officially known by its nickname of The Pit), and North Campus. This period also saw the foundation of UNM's branch facilities in Los Alamos and Gallup and the acquisition of the D.H. Lawrence Ranch north of Taos.

During the early 1970s, two sit-in protests at UNM led to a response from law enforcement officers. On May 5, 1970, protestors against the Vietnam War and the Kent State massacre occupied the Student Union Building. The National Guard was ordered to sweep the building and arrest those inside; eleven students and journalists were bayonetted when those outside did not hear the order to disperse given inside. On May 10, 1972, a peaceful sit-in protest near Kirtland Air Force Base led to the arrest of thirty-five people and was pushed back to UNM, leading to eight more arrests. The following day, tear gas was used against hundreds of demonstrators on campus and the situation continued to deteriorate, leading the university to declare a state of emergency.

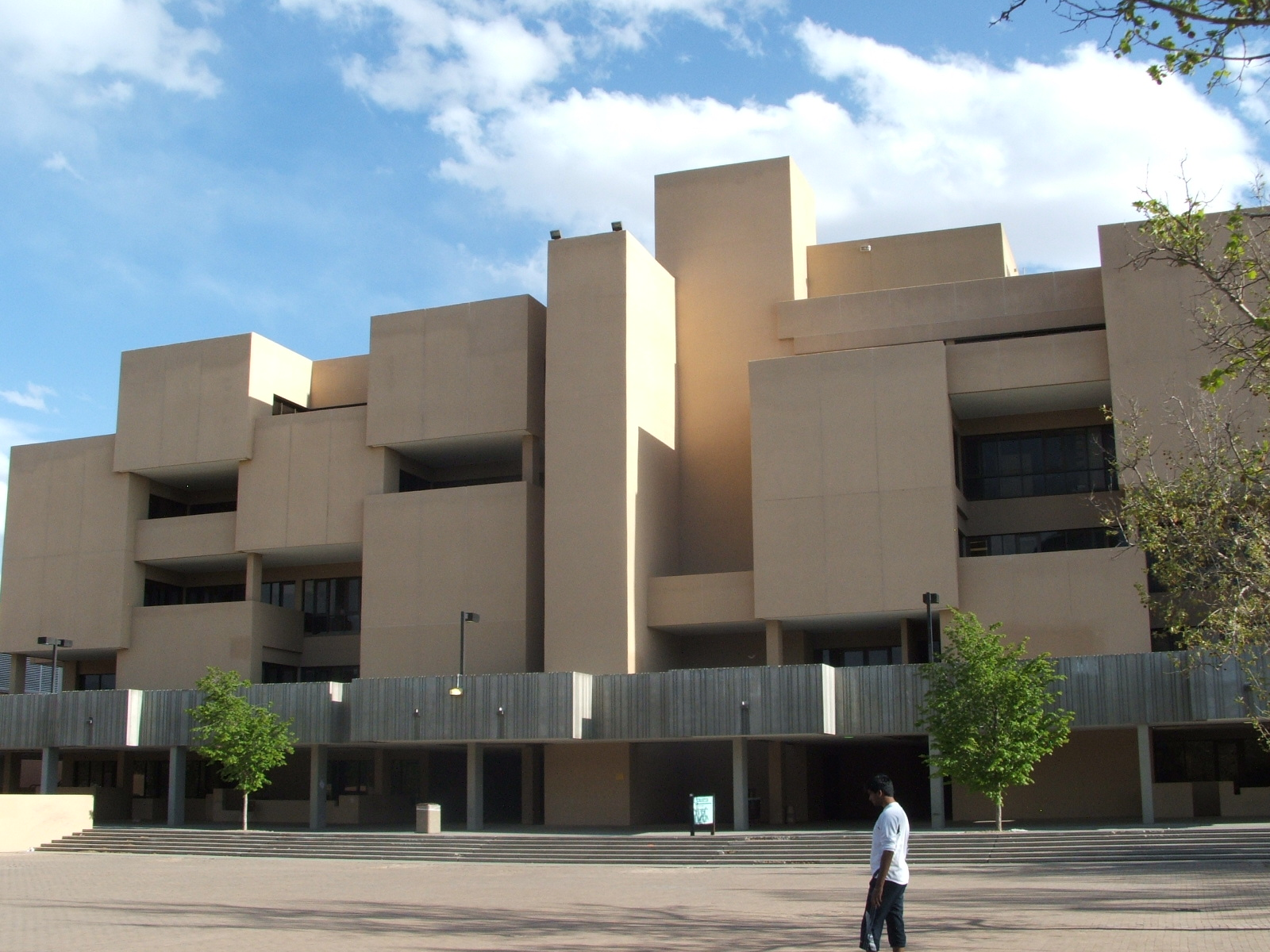
Humanities Building, added in 1970

New programs and schools were created in the 1970s and the university gained control over the hospital on North Campus. New facilities for the medical and law schools were constructed on North Campus and new Main Campus buildings were constructed on the site of the now demolished Zimmerman Field, including Ortega Hall, Woodward Hall, the Humanities building, and the Art building. The campus also underwent a new landscaping plan, which included the construction of the duck pond west of Zimmerman Library and the conversion of many streets to pedestrian malls in order to make a more pedestrian-friendly campus.

At the end of the decade, the university was implicated in a recruiting scandal dubbed "Lobogate" by the press. An FBI wiretap on the phone of a prominent Lobo booster recorded a conversation in which basketball head coach Norm Ellenberger arranged with assistant coach Manny Goldstein to transfer bogus credits from a California junior college to the office of the UNM registrar. Subsequent investigation turned up a manufactured college seal from Mercer County Community College in New Jersey, along with blank transcripts and records of previous forgery. Further investigation uncovered alleged incentives like cars and apartments doled out to prime players and exposed a vast network of sports gambling. The scandal forced Ellenberger to resign and defined the term of William E. Davis, UNM's eleventh president.

=== Recent history ===
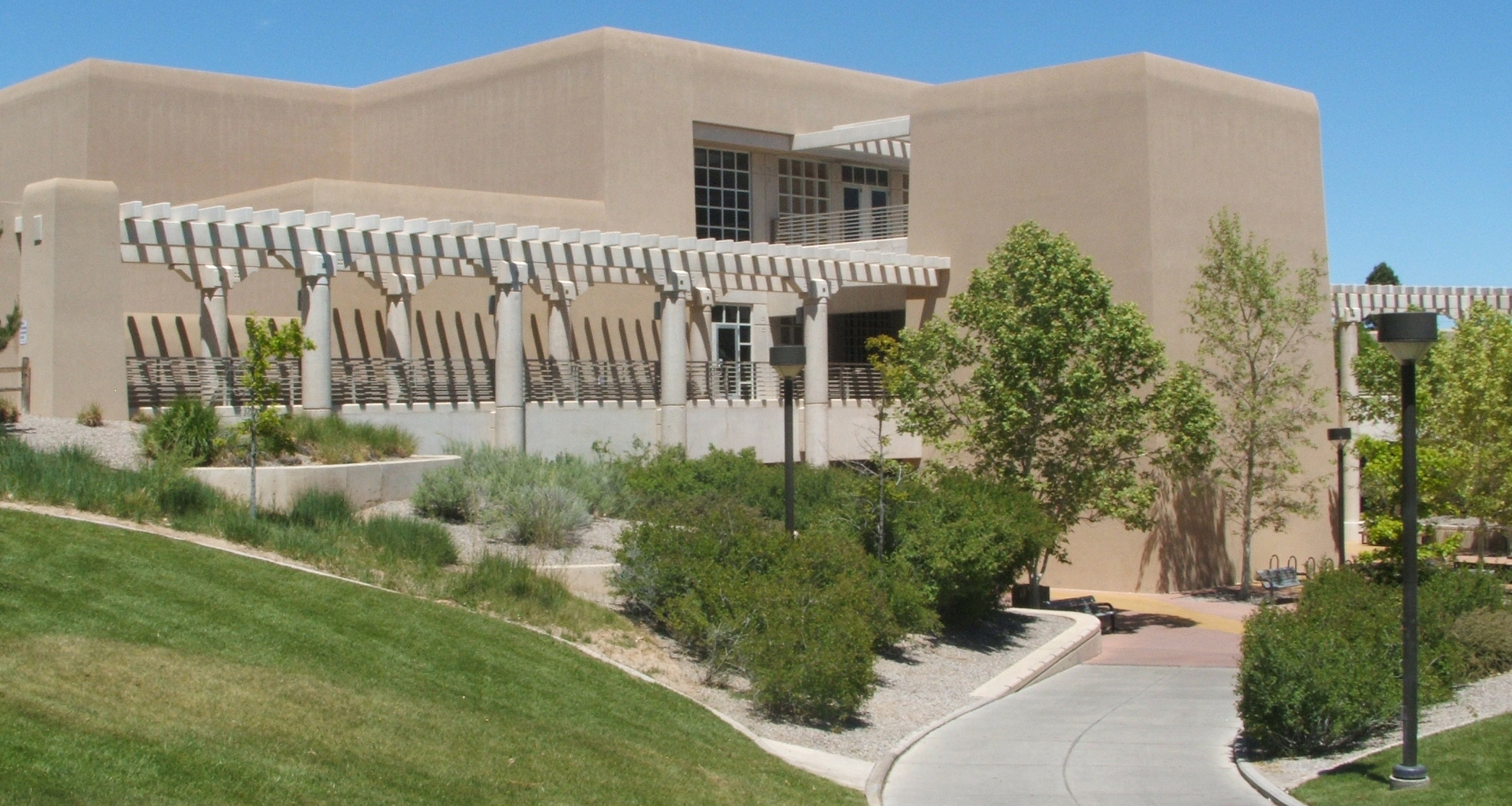
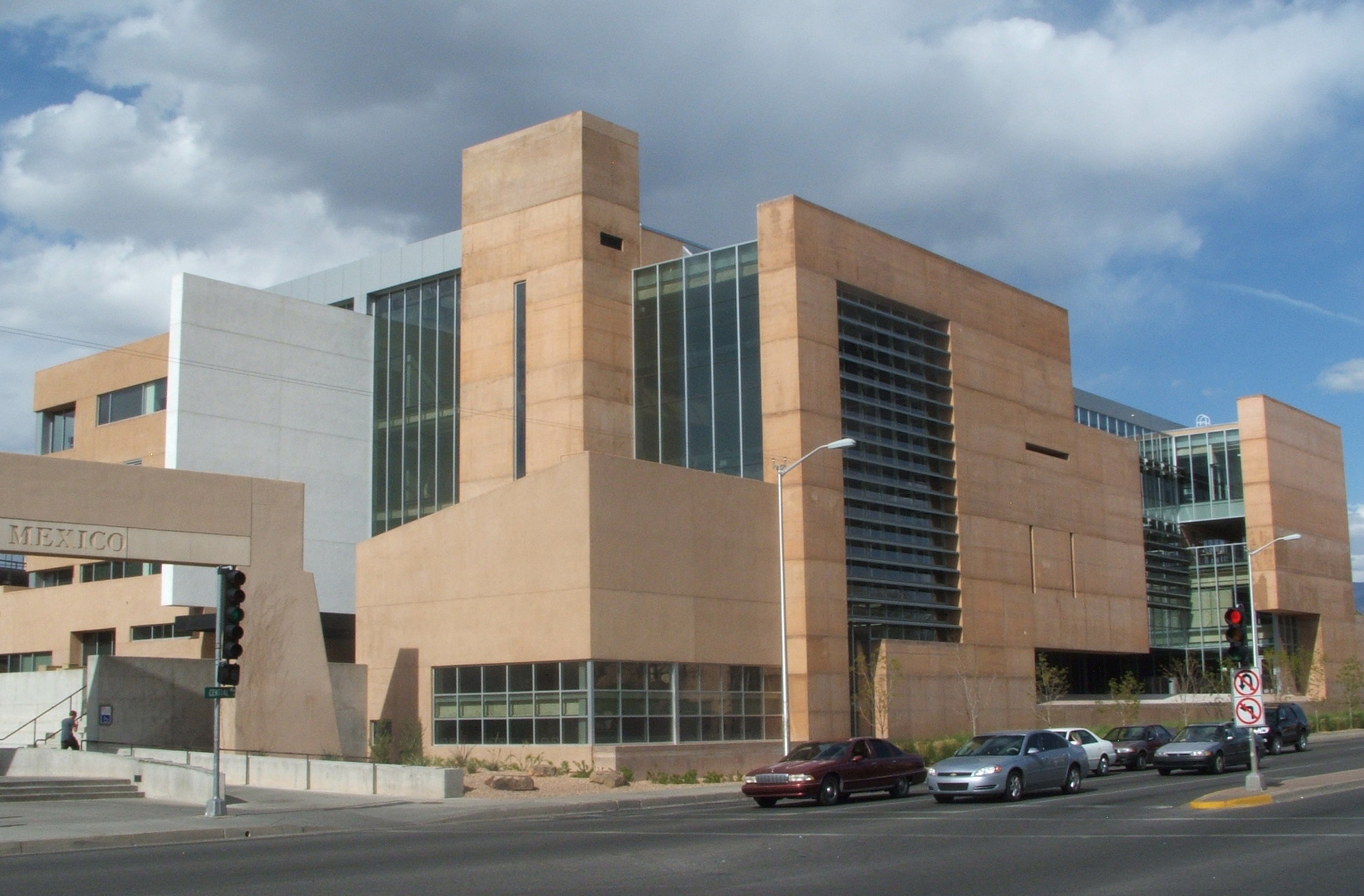
Dane Smith Hall, built in 1999 (above),
George Pearl Hall, built in 2006 (below)

The university has continued to grow, with expanding enrollment and new facilities. In the 1980s, dramatic expansion occurred at the medical center, business school, and engineering school. The Centennial Library was also constructed. During the 1990s, an Honors College was founded, and the university completed construction of a new bookstore and Dane Smith Hall. The Research Park at South Campus was also expanded.

By this point, the university had one of the largest student and faculty populations of Hispanics and Native Americans in the country. A study released in 1995 showed that the number of full-time Hispanic faculty at UNM was four times greater than the national average and the number of Native American teachers five times greater. The schools of law and business had some of the largest Hispanic student populations of any university in the country.

In the first decade of the 2000s, major expansion began on medical facilities on North Campus. The current visitor center, a new engineering center, and George Pearl Hall were constructed. Renovations and expansions were undertaken on several buildings on Main Campus, along with the creation of a branch campus in Rio Rancho. This wave of construction is continuing at present with more projects ongoing.

In 2016, UNM was the first university in the country to launch a Signature School Program with the Central Intelligence Agency, which enables students to interact with analysts and learn how to join the CIA once they graduate.

In 2017, the campus became smoke and tobacco free, with the exception of a few designated smoking areas located near the residence halls. The New Mexico Department of Health assisted in the effort, paying for signs and stickers around campus as well as a PSA shown during orientation.

Into the 21st century, UNM has become a major contributor to New Mexico's burgeoning bioscience sector: The university's health sciences and biomedical engineering programs have helped launch 39 health-related startups since 2013, as well as 40 tech startups during the same period. Bioscience ventures accounted for 17 of 29 companies, or 58%, that formed from UNM-based research and technology between 2019 and 2022. The school has launched several programs and initiatives aimed at fostering more technology startups, often in collaboration with local, state, and federal agencies as well as other southwestern universities. In 2021, the Directed Energy Center at UNM became established hrough a cooperative agreement with the Air Force Research Laboratory (AFRL).

On April 22, 2024, UNM students joined other campuses across the United States in protests and establishing encampments against the Israel–Hamas war and the genocide of Palestinians in Gaza. There was support from faculty for the protests, and Jewish participants celebrated Passover. However police were called in and made arrests, which led to injuries to students.

On July 25, 2025, a shooting inside a dormitory left one 14 year-old boy dead and a student injured. As a result of the shooting, UNM was placed under shelter-in-place.

== Campus ==
UNM's main campus is located on 800 acres (3.2 km^{2}) in Albuquerque on the heights a mile east of Downtown Albuquerque. It is split in three parts – central, north, and south. The central campus is situated between Central Avenue on the south, Girard Boulevard on the east, Lomas Boulevard on the north, and University Boulevard on the west, and is home to the main academic university. The North Campus, which includes the medical, nursing, pharmacological, and law schools as well as the University of New Mexico Hospital, is located on the north side of Lomas across from the central campus. The South campus is located a mile south of the central campus, centered around the intersection of University Boulevard and Avenida César Chavez, and includes most of UNM's athletic facilities. The central campus is noted for its unique Pueblo Revival architectural style, with many of the buildings designed by former university architect John Gaw Meem, who is credited with imbuing the campus with its distinctive Southwestern feel. The central campus is also home to the University of New Mexico Arboretum, which contains some 320 species of woody plants.

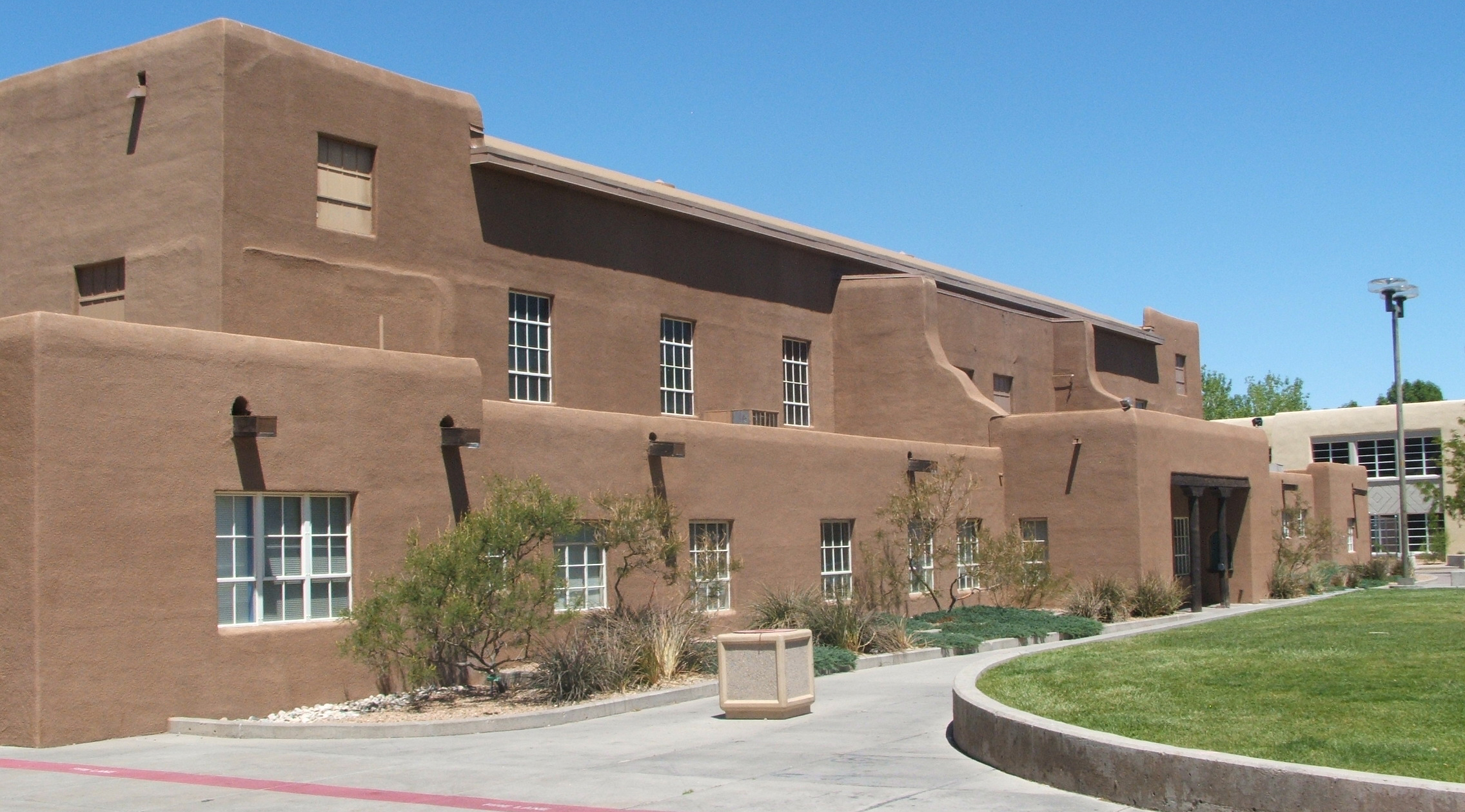
Carlisle Gymnasium

Eight university buildings are listed separately on the National Register of Historic Places, including Hodgin Hall, the university's first building, and two adjacent structures, the Art Annex and Sara Reynolds Hall. The Estufa, one of the first Pueblo Revival style structures in the country and the first on campus, is also on the list. Other structures on the registry are Carlisle Gymnasium, Jonson Gallery, Scholes Hall, and the University House.

The central campus is home to four museums: the Maxwell Museum of Anthropology in the anthropology building, the Silver Family Geology Museum and the Meteorite Museum which are located in Northrop Hall, the Museum of Southwestern Biology in the CERIA building, and the University Art Museum in the Center for the Arts.

In an effort to promote sustainability and lessen the environmental impact of the campus, UNM has been reducing the campus energy usage through monitoring and retrofitting cooling, heating, water, and lighting technologies. Due to these efforts, the university's grade on the College Sustainability Report Card 2009 improved from a "C" to a "B" according to the Sustainable Endowments Institute. Since 2008, following an executive order that all new state buildings over 15,000 sq ft (1,400 m^{2}) must meet LEED silver at minimum, all new construction on campus has been registered for LEED status. So far, an expansion of Castetter Hall and the Technology and Education Center are the only LEED-certified buildings on campus, with a Gold and Platinum rating respectively. Several other buildings are currently registered for LEED status.

=== Libraries ===
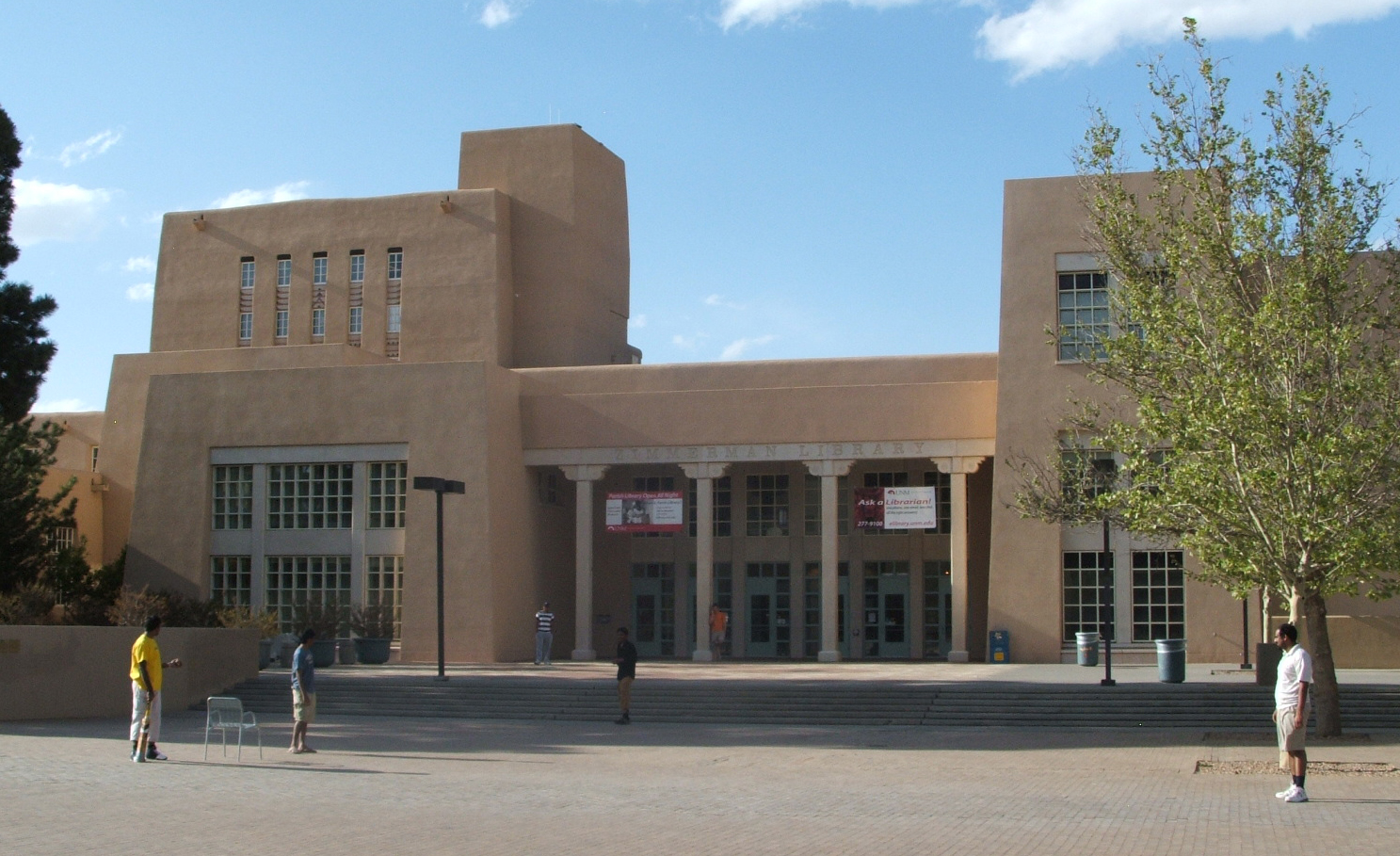
Zimmerman Library

The primary UNM library units are the Health Sciences Library and Informatics Center, the Law Library, and the University Libraries, which consists of:

- Centennial Science and Engineering Library
- Center for Southwest Research (special collections and archives—housed in Zimmerman Library)
- Fine Arts and Design Library
- Parish Memorial Business and Economics Library
- Zimmerman Library (for humanities and social sciences)

== Academics ==
The University of New Mexico offers more than 215 degree and certificate programs, including 94 baccalaureate, 71 masters and 37 doctoral degrees, through 12 colleges and schools:

- Anderson School of Management
- College of Arts & Sciences
- College of Education
- College of Fine Arts
- College of Nursing
- College of Pharmacy
- College of Population Health

- School of Architecture and Planning
- School of Engineering
- School of Law
- School of Medicine
- School of Public Administration
- University College

=== Rankings ===
Academic rankings

National
- Forbes: 567
- U.S. News & World Report: 242 (tie)
- Washington Monthly: 141
- WSJ/College Pulse: 401–500

Global
- ARWU: 501-600
- QS: 751-760
- THE: 551–600
- U.S. News & World Report: 445 (tie)

National program rankings
Program	Ranking
Biological Sciences	98
Chemistry	106
Clinical Psychology	88
Computer Science	75
Earth Sciences	46
Education	123
Engineering	87
English	85
Fine Arts	64
History	69
Law	99
Mathematics	86
Medicine: Primary Care	52
Medicine: Research	81
Nursing–Doctorate	104
Nursing–Master's	87
Nursing–Midwifery	11
Occupational Therapy	42
Pharmacy	43
Physical Therapy	137
Physician Assistant	108
Physics	83
Political Science	81
Psychology	131
Public Affairs	101
Public Health	102
Sociology	80
Speech–Language Pathology	72

Global program rankings
Program	Ranking
Arts & Humanities	198
Biology & Biochemistry	318
Chemistry	284
Clinical Medicine	299
Engineering	623
Environment/Ecology	238
Geosciences	226
Materials Science	410
Molecular Biology & Genetics	236
Neuroscience & Behavior	172
Oncology	201
Physics	281
Plant & Animal Science	307
Psychiatry/Psychology	141
Social Sciences & Public Health	208
Space Science	225

In its list of "Best Colleges" in the U.S. for 2022, U.S. News & World Report ranked UNM as tied for 212th among national universities, tied for 107th among public universities, and tied at 90th for "Top Performers on Social Mobility". Several graduate programs are highly ranked nationally, including family medicine (7th), graduate clinical training (8th), nuclear engineering (14th), and primary care (16th); among the graduate programs in the top 100 nationwide are electrical engineering (63), computer engineering (69), chemical engineering (77), and physics (77).

UNM ranks 8th in the "Military Friendly" rating, which denotes institutions that excel in accommodating, aiding, and retaining students who are military veterans.

=== Undergraduate admissions ===
Fall freshman statistics
	2014	2013	2012	2011	2010
Applicants	12,574	11,995	11,467	11,410	11,220
Admits	5,706	6,799	7,405	7,288	7,459
% Admitted	45.4	56.7	64.6	63.9	66.5
Enrolled	3,132	3,518	3,424	3,341	3,604
Average GPA	3.40	3.37	3.39	3.18	3.29
SAT Range*	965–1240	950–1220	940–1210	940–1190	960–1240
ACT Range	20–25	19–25	19–25	19–25	19–25
* SAT out of 1600

Undergraduate admission to UNM is rated "selective" by U.S. News & World Report, with an acceptance rate of 65% according to The Princeton Review. For Fall 2019, the school received 12,181 freshmen applications, of which 5,973 were admitted (49.0%) and 2,594 enrolled. The average GPA of enrolled freshmen was 3.44, while the middle 50% range of SAT composite scores were 1000–1290, 520–640 for evidence-based reading and writing, and 520–630 for math. The middle 50% range of the ACT Composite score was 19–25.

== Athletics ==
UNM's NCAA Division I program (FBS for football) offers 18 varsity sports. The teams are known as the Lobos, who compete in the Mountain West Conference. Two human mascots, referred to as Louie Lobo and Lucy Lobo, rouse crowds at New Mexico athletic events. The official school colors are cherry and silver. The Lobos have won national championships in skiing and cross country running.

=== Rivalries ===
UNM maintains strong athletic rivalries with New Mexico State University. The UNM-NMSU rivalry is called the Rio Grande Rivalry, a competitive series based on points awarded to the winners of head-to-head competitions between the two universities in every sport. A rotating trophy is granted to the winning university for a period of one year, until the award presentation the following year. The rivalry is celebrated at UNM by the Red Rally, a large bonfire that takes place the Thursday before the UNM-NMSU football game.

=== Basketball ===
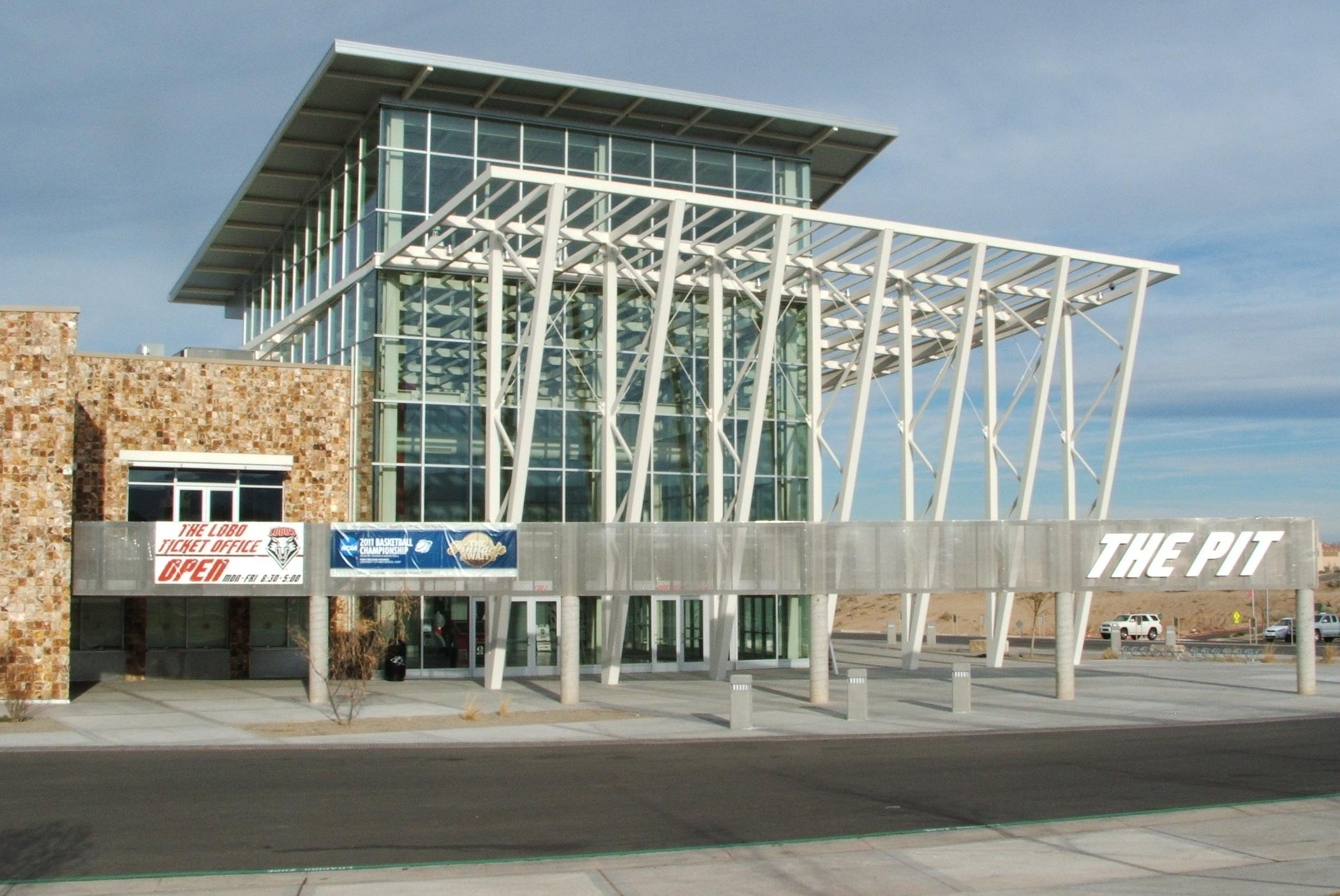
The Pit

The Lobo men's basketball team is famous for its venue, The Pit. It may be best known as the site of the 1983 NCAA basketball championship, in which North Carolina State University, coached by Jim Valvano, upset the University of Houston.

The UNM women's basketball team has won the Mountain West championship for four of the past five years, and have gone to the NCAA Tournament for the past six consecutive years.

=== Cross country ===
The UNM women's cross-country team won the NCAA championship in 2015 and 2017. Lobo Ednah Kurgat also won the individual title in 2017, and UNM's Weini Kelati won in 2019.

=== Football ===
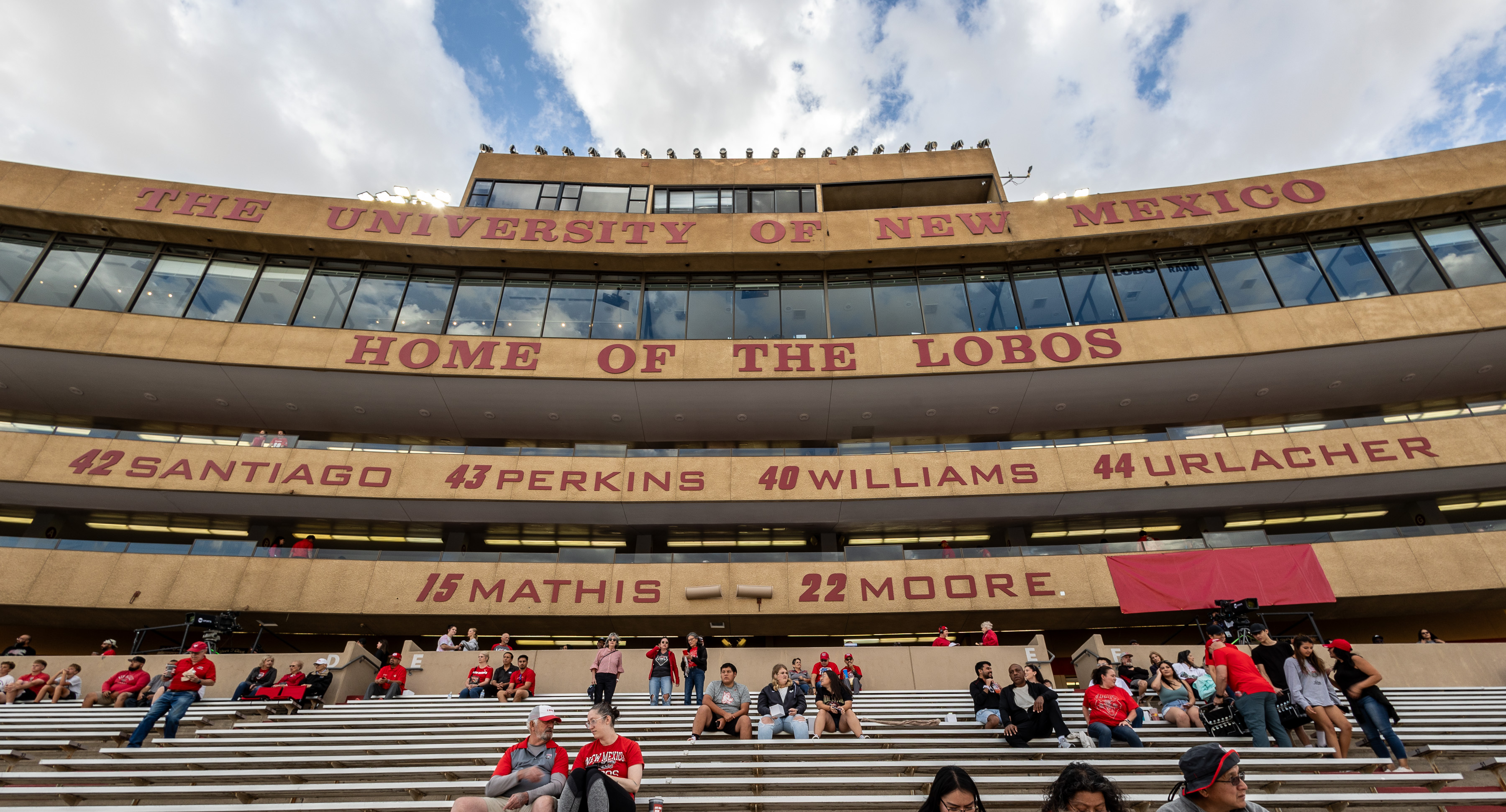
University Stadium

The Lobo football team plays at University Stadium which is located across the street from The Pit.

The team has been to six bowl games since 1997 after a 35-year bowl drought. Placekicker Katie Hnida made history in the 2003 Las Vegas Bowl when she became the first woman to play in an NCAA Division I-A game, attempting but missing an extra point in the Lobos's 27–13 loss to UCLA. She later attempted and made two extra points in UNM's 72–8 victory over Texas State.

New Mexico also lost its 2003 and 2004 bowl games, making its record in bowl games 2–8–1. The football team went to the first year of the New Mexico Bowl in 2006 and lost to San Jose State University 20–12. In 2007, the Lobos finished the regular season 8–4 and were invited to the New Mexico Bowl for the second straight season. The Lobos shut out the favored Nevada Wolf Pack 23–0 to win their first bowl game since the 1961 Aviation Bowl.

== Student life ==
Undergraduate demographics as of Fall 2023
Race and ethnicity	Total
Hispanic	51%
White	29%
American Indian/Alaska Native	6%
Asian	4%
Two or more races	4%
Black	3%
International student	2%
Unknown	1%
Economic diversity
Low-income (Note: The percentage of students who received an income-based federal Pell grant intended for low-income students.)	37%
Affluent (Note: The percentage of students who are a part of the American middle class at the bare minimum.)	63%

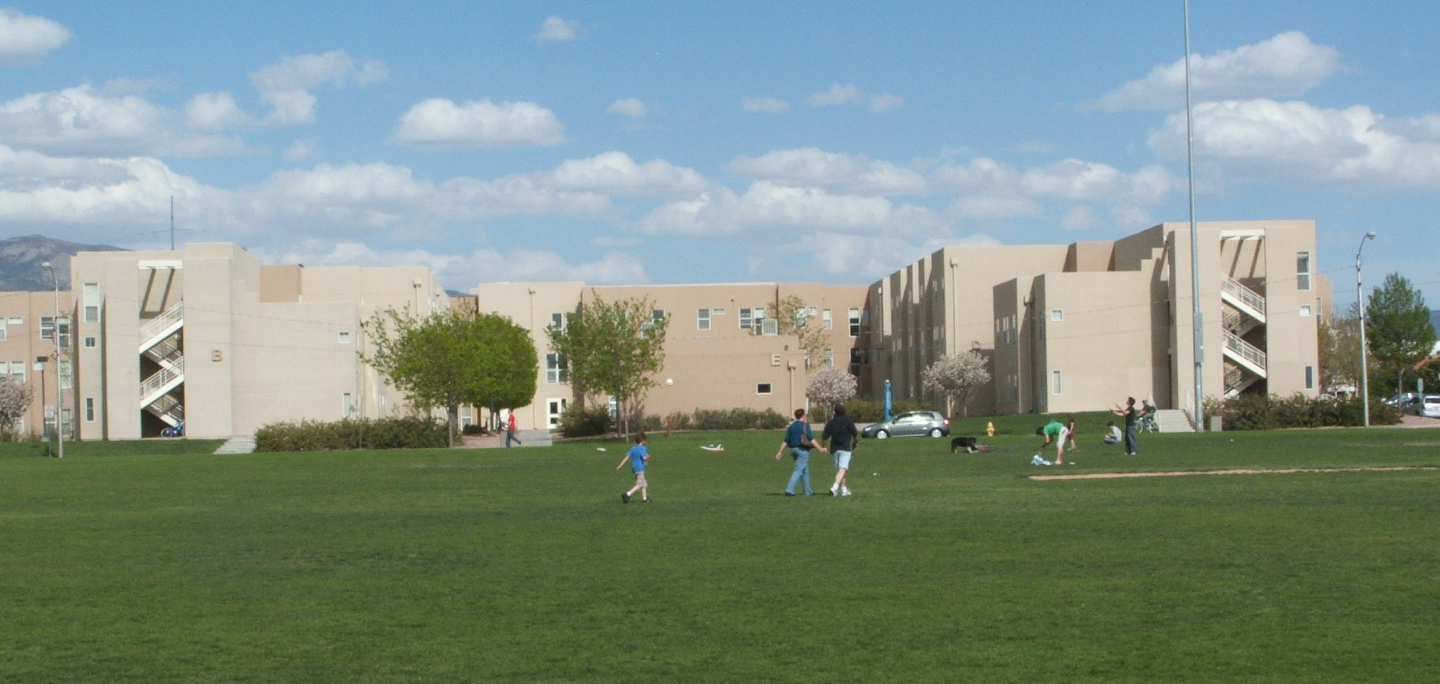
Redondo Village, a Residence Hall at UNM

The main university campus is located in the lower Heights of Albuquerque just east of Downtown Albuquerque and is the focal point for the neighborhoods surrounding it; the neighborhoods to the immediate south and west are home to a large population of students. However, the vast majority of UNM's student population live off-campus around the Albuquerque metropolitan area, with only just over 2,000 living in on-campus housing.

The Student Union Building (SUB) is a major activity center for students on-campus, with a food court, a movie theater, event facilities, student government and organization offices, student services, and recreation areas. Another major hotspot for students is the popular Frontier Restaurant, a late-night eatery located across Central Avenue from main campus and a popular meeting spot for students. The Duck Pond is a popular relaxation spot for students and local residents, particularly in the warmer months.

=== Student organizations ===
There are over 400 student-run organizations on campus, which include academic, athletic, ethnic, honorary, political, religious, and service groups, as well as fraternities and sororities.

==== Student government ====
===== ASUNM =====
The Associated Students of the University of New Mexico (ASUNM) is the undergraduate student government of UNM, with an elected student body president, vice-president, student court, and 20 senators. Senators are elected to two-semester terms. There are two elections each school year; in each, 10 senators are elected. Many candidates run in slates. There are different agencies within ASUNM, such as Lobo Spirit and Community Experience.

===== GPSA =====
The Graduate and Professional Student Association (GPSA) is the graduate student government of UNM, led by an elected president and a representative council from the different schools of study on campus since 1969.

=== Greek life ===
The University of New Mexico is home to several fraternities and sororities; on-campus sources claim that around 5% of the UNM student body is involved in Greek life.

=== Traditions ===
- Homecoming Week is held each fall to welcome back alumni. Over the course of the week, the student body elects a Homecoming King and Queen and six attendants (three male and three female) to serve as the homecoming court.
- Lobo Day is a celebration for the founding date of the university on February 28, 1889.
- Red Rally is a rally held before the football match with UNM's rival, New Mexico State University.

=== Media ===
UNM owns and operates KUNM-FM, one of two National Public Radio stations in Albuquerque. In 2008, KUNM-FM won 16 Associated Press awards, including Station of the Year. UNM also owns and operates the University of New Mexico Press, its publishing arm established in 1929. With Albuquerque Public Schools, UNM also operates New Mexico PBS, Albuquerque's public television station which currently broadcasts in High Definition Digital on two channels, English and Spanish. The Daily Lobo is UNM's student-run daily newspaper and is a publication serving the metro area.

== See also ==
- List of colleges and universities in New Mexico
- University of New Mexico–Gallup
- University of New Mexico–Los Alamos
- University of New Mexico–Taos
- University of New Mexico–Valencia
- University of New Mexico–West
