= List of University of New Mexico buildings =

This list of University of New Mexico (UNM) buildings catalogs structures owned and operated by the university.

Building numbering corresponds to those on Maps of the UNM Campuses, Office of the University Architect, 1989 (periodically updated)

== Albuquerque metropolitan area ==
Buildings in the sortable table below reside within the Albuquerque metropolitan area, the home of the university's main campus; initially listed alphabetically.

=== Central Campus ===
Named after Central Avenue, which passes by the campus.

Image	Name	Built	Architect	Bldg. #	Location	Usage	Awards & Designations
	Alumni Memorial Chapel	1960	Holien and Buckley	25	35°05′06″N 106°37′28″W	Chapel	
	Alvarado Hall	1965	William E. Ellison	157	35°05′05″N 106°36′53″W	Residence Hall	
	Anderson Graduate School of Management	1987	Hutchinson, Brown and Partners	87	35°05′12″N 106°37′14″W	Anderson School of Management, Parish Library	AIA Albuq. Chapter: Award of Merit 1969
	Anderson School of Management	1968 (west wing demolished in 2017)	John Reed	76	35°05′11″N 106°37′11″W	Anderson School of Management	
	Anthropology	1937 (Maxwell Museum addition 1972)	John Gaw Meem, 1972:McHugh and Kidder	11	35°05′07″N 106°37′29″W	Anthropology, Maxwell Museum of Anthropology	
	Anthropology Annex	1937 (1982 remodelling)	John Gaw Meem, 1982:Patrick McClernon	12	35°05′01″N 106°37′27″W	Anthropology	
	Army ROTC	1931		175	35°05′20″N 106°37′22″W	Army ROTC	
	Art	1977	Antoine Predock	84	35°04′57″N 106°37′17″W	Art	
	Art Annex	1926	Trost and Trost / Elson H. Norris	105	35°04′53″N 106°37′29″W	Art studios	National Register of Historic Places; New Mexico State Register of Cultural Properties 1497
	Bandelier Hall East	1930	George M. Williamson and Co. (Miles Brittelle, designer)	8	35°05′03″N 106°37′27″W	Geography	
	Bandelier Hall West	1941	John Gaw Meem / Hugo Zehner and Assoc.	16	35°05′04″N 106°37′29″W	Geography	
	Biology Annex	1948	John Gaw Meem / Hugo Zehner	19	35°04′58″N 106°37′25″W	Biology	
	Bookstore	1996		102	35°04′53″N 106°37′13″W	Bookstore	
	Bureau of Business	1940		168	35°05′14″N 106°37′14″W	Economic Research Data Bank	
	Carlisle Gymnasium	1928	Gaastra, Gladding and Johnson	4	35°05′01″N 106°37′22″W	Gymnasium	National Register of Historic Places; New Mexico State Register of Cultural Properties 1453
	Casas del Rio	2012		91–94	35°05′05″N 106°36′57″W	Residence Hall (American Campus Communities)	LEED Green (Pending)
	Castetter Hall	1951 (expansions in 1963, 2009, and 2011)	Meem, Zehner and Holien, 1963: Flatow, Moore, Bryan, and Fairburn	21	35°04′56″N 106°37′22″W	Biology	NM Society of Architects Honor Award 1970; LEED Gold (2009 addition)
	Centennial Engineering Center	2008	VHGArchitects, Shepley Bulfinch	112	35°05′00″N 106°37′32″W	School of Engineering Administration, Civil Engineering, Biomedical Engineering, Environmental Engineering, Engineering Labs	
	Center for the Arts	1963 (expansions in 1966, 1970, and 1973)	Holien and Buckley, 1973: William R. Buckley	62	35°04′56″N 106°37′13″W	Fine Arts, Keller Hall, Popejoy Hall, Art Museum	
	Center for Science, Technology, and Policy	1995		185	35°05′17″N 106°37′25″W		
	Clark Hall	1951 (expansion in 1969)	Meem, Zehner and Holien, 1969: Ferguson, Stevens, Mallory and Pearl	22	35°05′01″N 106°37′25″W	Chemistry	AIA Albuq. Chapter: Award of Merit 1969
	Collaborative Teaching and Learning Building	2013		55	35°05′09″N 106°37′11″W	College of Education	LEED Silver
	Communication and Journalism	1949 (renovated 2007)	John Gaw Meem / Hugo Zehner and Assoc.	115	35°04′53″N 106°37′22″W	Communication, Journalism	
	Consortium for Environmental Research, Informatics & Art (CERIA)	1974 (renovated 2000)	Holmes and Gianinni	83	35°05′00″N 106°37′18″W	Biology, Cinematic Arts, Art Technology Center (originally UNM Bookstore)	NM Society of Architects: Honor Award 1975
	Coronado Hall	1959	Shaefer, Merrill and Assoc.	155	35°05′02″N 106°36′53″W	Residence Hall	
	Counseling, Assistance and Referral Service			184	35°05′18″N 106°37′26″W		
	Crystal Growth Facility	1986		331	1000 University Blvd SE		
	Dane Smith Hall	1998		48	35°05′10″N 106°37′23″W	Classrooms	
	DeVargas Hall	1969	Ernest J. Kump and Assoc. / William W. Ellison	75	35°05′10″N 106°37′01″W	Residence Hall	
	Dispute Resolution	1938		29	35°05′11″N 106°37′26″W		
	Economics	1952	Meem, Zehner, Holien and Assoc.	57	35°05′10″N 106°37′14″W	Economics, Sociology	
	Electrical and Computer Engineering / Centennial Library	1986	Dean, Hunt and Assoc.	46	35°04′59″N 106°37′29″W	Electrical Engineering, Computer Engineering, Science & Engineering Library	
	Engineering & Science Computer Pod	1916	Francis Barry Byrne / J.S. LaDriere	2	35°04′58″N 106°37′28″W	Computer Station (original Chemistry Building, later arts annex, later architecture)	New Mexico State Register of Cultural Properties 417; City of Albuquerque Historic Landmark
	Equal Opportunity Programs	1948		42	35°05′10″N 106°37′28″W		
	Estufa	1908	Edward Buxton Cristy	47	35°05′02″N 106°37′33″W	Fraternity meeting room	National Register of Historic Places; New Mexico State Register of Cultural Properties 1412
	Extended University			187	35°05′15″N 106°37′26″W		
	Farris Engineering Center	1969 (renovated in 2018)	Flatow, Moore, Bryan, and Fairburn	119	35°04′56″N 106°37′31″W	Computer Science, Chemical and Nuclear Engineering	
	Ford Utilities Center	1948 (expansions in 1975 and 1979)	John Gaw Meem / Hugo Zehner and Assoc.	116	35°05′02″N 106°37′31″W	Utilities	
	George Pearl Hall	2007	Antoine Predock	195	35°04′53″N 106°37′08″W	Architecture & Planning, Landscape Architecture, Fabrications Lab, Fine Arts Library	
	Physics & Astronomy and Interdisciplinary Science Center	2019			Main campus	Physics & Astronomy	
	Redondo Village	2001		193A–E	Main Campus	Residence Hall	
	Regener Hall	1972	Pacheco and Graham	35	Main Campus	Physics	AIA Western Mountain Region: Commendation 1972
	Santa Clara Hall	1964	William W. Ellison	61	Main Campus	Residence Hall	
	Sara Raynolds Hall	1920	Arno K. Leupold / E.B. Cristy	104	Main Campus	Classrooms	National Register of Historic Places; New Mexico State Register of Cultural Properties 1455
	Scholes Hall	1936 (renovated 2007)	John Gaw Meem	10	35°05′07″N 106°37′25″W	Administration	National Register of Historic Places; New Mexico State Register of Cultural Properties 388
	Science and Mathematics Learning Center	2010		14	Main Campus		LEED Gold
	Simpson Hall	1963	Flatow, Moore, Bryan, and Fairburn	66	Main Campus	Counseling & Family Services	AIA Albuq. Chapter: Honor Award 1965
	Social Sciences	1987	Hutchinson, Brown and Partners	78	Main Campus	Sociology, Political Science	
	Student Health Center	1968	Holien and Buckley	73	Main Campus	Health Center, University College	
	Student Residence Center	1991	John Reed	88–90	Main Campus	Residence Hall	
	Student Union Building	1959 (alterations 1976, renovated 2004)	Meem, Holien and Buckley, 1976: Antoine Predock	60	Main Campus	Student Government, Student Activities Center	
	Tamarind Institute	1960 (renovation in 2010)		162	2500 Central Ave SE	Tamarind Institute: Lithography	AIA Albuq. Chapter: Honor Award 1965; LEED Silver (pending)
	Technology and Education Center	1963 (expansion in 2010)	Flatow, Moore, Bryan, and Fairburn (original)	64	Main Campus	College of Education	LEED Platinum (2010 addition)
	The White House	1950		44	35°05′12″N 106°37′28″W	Title V & Mentoring Institute	
	Travelstead Hall	1963	Flatow, Moore, Bryan, and Fairburn	65	Main Campus	College of Education	AIA Albuq. Chapter: Honor Award 1965
	University Advisement & Enrichment Center	1984		85	Main Campus	Admissions, Bursars, Recruitment Services, Career Services	
	University Club	1940		160	35°05′14″N 106°37′12″W	Faculty & Staff Club	
	University House	1930	George M. Williamson and Co. (Miles Brittelle, designer)	51	Main Campus	University President's House	National Register of Historic Places; New Mexico State Register of Cultural Properties 1454
	Welcome Center	2004		198	Main Campus	Welcome Center, Visitor Parking	
	Woodward Hall	1973	W.C. Kruger and Assoc.	82	Main Campus	Classrooms, Media Technology, Testing Center	
	Yale Parking Structure	2010	Dekker/Perich/Sabatini	144	Main Campus	Parking	
	Zimmerman Library	1937 (expansions in 1965 and 1974)	John Gaw Meem, 1965: Ferguson Stevens Mallory and Pearl, 1974: Dean Hunt and Assoc.	53	Main Campus	Main Library	
	Hibben Center	2002		15	35°05′05″N 106°37′31″W	Anthropology	
	High Performance Computing	1960	William Burk, Jr.	126	1601 Central Ave. NE; 35°04′55″N 106°37′39″W	Art, Research, Tech & Science Lab	
	Hodgin Hall	1892 (remodeled in 1908 and 1932, renovated 2011)	Jesse M. Wheelock (original), E. B. Cristy (1908 remodeling)	103	35°04′54″N 106°37′31″W	Alumni Center	National Register of Historic Places; New Mexico State Register of Cultural Properties 336
	Hokona Hall	1957 (residence hall section renovated in 2010)	Meem, Zehner, Holien and Assoc.	58	35°05′11″N 106°37′06″W	Residence Hall, Education, Campus Police	
	House Of Prevention Epidemiology	1953		191	35°05′15″N 106°37′23″W		
	HSC Public Affairs	1950		221	1000 Stanford NE	Health Sciences Public Affairs	
	Huber House	1959		140	35°05′08″N 106°36′51″W	Real Estate	
	Information Assurance Center	1942		149	35°05′14″N 106°37′14″W		
	Information Technologies	1949 (expansions 1968, 1970, 1977)	John Gaw Meem / Hugo Zehner and Assoc., 1968-77: William R. Buckley	153	Main Campus		
	Institute for Social Research	1941		150	35°05′14″N 106°37′16″W		
	Internal Audit	1938	John Gaw Meem	20	35°05′09″N 106°37′26″W		
	John and June Perovich Business Center	2005		183	35°05′22″N 106°37′29″W	Human Resources, Speech and Hearing	
	Johnson Center	1958 (expansions in 1961, 1971, and 1984)	Meem, Zehner, Holien and Assoc., 1971: Buckley, Luna and Merker, 1984: Dorman-Nelson	59	35°04′57″N 106°37′06″W	Physical Education, Recreation	
	Jonson Gallery	1949	John Gaw Meem / Hugo Zehner and Assoc.	152	35°05′14″N 106°37′17″W	Center for Health Policy	National Register of Historic Places
	Kiva Lecture Hall	1963	Flatow, Moore, Bryan, and Fairburn	69	35°05′05″N 106°37′08″W	Classroom	AIA Albuq. Chapter: Honor Award 1965
	La Posada Dining Hall	1969 (remodeled in 2017)	Ernest J. Kump and Assoc. / William W. Ellison	77	35°05′08″N 106°36′59″W	Cafeteria	
	Laguna Hall	1969	Ernest J. Kump and Assoc. / William W. Ellison	74	35°05′09″N 106°37′01″W	Residence Hall	
	Latin American Database and Outreach	1938		182A–C	35°05′18″N 106°37′20″W		
	Latin American/Iberian Institute	1950		165	35°05′16″N 106°37′20″W		
	Logan Hall	1972	Flatow, Moore, Bryan, and Fairburn	34	35°04′56″N 106°37′27″W	Psychology	
	Lomas Parking Structure	1985 (Expansion 1990)	Stevens, Mallory, Pearl and Campbell	172	35°05′13″N 106°36′59″W	Parking	
	Manzanita Center	1963	Flatow, Moore, Bryan, and Fairburn	70	35°05′05″N 106°37′06″W	Counselor Education	AIA Albuq. Chapter: Honor Award 1965
	Marron Hall	1931 (expansion in 1941)	John Gaw Meem / Hugo Zehner and Assoc.	9	35°04′55″N 106°37′23″W	Offices, Daily Lobo	
	Masley Hall	1963	Flatow, Moore, Bryan, and Fairburn	68	35°05′06″N 106°37′08″W	Art Education	AIA Albuq. Chapter: Honor Award 1965
	Mattox Sculpture Center	1964		123		Art Studios	
	McKinnon Center for Management	2018	BORA Architects	54	Main Campus	Anderson School of Management	
	Mechanical Engineering	1978	Pacheco and Graham	122	35°04′56″N 106°37′34″W	Mechanical Engineering	
	Mesa Vista Hall	1950	John Gaw Meem / Hugo Zehner and Assoc.	56	35°05′02″N 106°37′09″W	Administration, History, Ethnic Studies, Financial Aid, Accessibility Resource Center, TRIO-SSS & McNair (originally residence hall & dining hall)	
	Mitchell Hall	1950 (renovated 2009)	Meem, Zehner, Holien and Assoc.	23	35°05′03″N 106°37′23″W	Classrooms	LEED Silver (LEED Gold pending)
	Naval Science	1941	John Gaw Meem	151	35°05′16″N 106°37′18″W	Navy ROTC	
	Northrop Hall	1953	Meem, Zehner, Holien and Assoc.	24	35°04′59″N 106°37′22″W	Geology	
	Office of Research	1930	University of New Mexico Press offices	26	35°05′10″N 106°37′28″W	Research Compliance	
	Oñate Hall	1964	William W. Ellison	156	35°05′04″N 106°36′49″W	KUNM (originally a residence hall)	
	Ortega Hall	1971	Ferguson, Stevens, Mallory and Pearl	79	35°05′02″N 106°37′18″W	Foreign Languages	
	Parking Services			125	Main Campus	Parking and Transportation	

=== North Campus ===
Image	Name	Built	Architect	Bldg. #	Location	Usage	Awards & Designations
	Automotive	1968		216		Physical Plant	
	Barbara and Bill Richardson Pavilion	2007	Studio Southwest Architects	286		UNM Hospital	
	Basic Medical Sciences	1967	W.C. Kruger and Assoc.	211		School of Medicine, Classrooms	
	Biomedical Research	1982	W.C. Kruger and Assoc.	253		Health Sciences	
	Bratton Hall	1968 (expansion in 2003)	George Wright, 2003:Edward Mazria	218		Law School and Library	
	Cancer Research Facility	1997	Dekker-Perich and Assoc.	229		Health Sciences	
	Carrie Tingley Hospital	1959		270	North Campus	Hospital	
	Casita de Milagros	1993		279	North Campus		
	Center for Wildlife Law			280	North Campus		
	Championship Golf Course Clubhouse	1968 (expansion in 1996)	John Reed		3601 University Blvd SE		AIA Albuq. Chapter: Honor Award 1967; AIA Western Mountain Region: Award of Merit 1968
	Child Care Center	1991	Van Dorn Hooker	277, 281	North Campus; 35°05′45″N 106°37′32″W		
	Children's Psychiatric Center	1975	Barker, Bol and Assoc.	236–245, 254	North Campus		
	Clinical & Translational Science Center	1972	Flatow, Moore, Bryan, and Fairburn	227	North Campus	Health Sciences	
	Continuing Education	1969 (expansion in 1998)		259	North Campus		
	Contract Archeology	1964		273	North Campus	Archeology	
	Diabetes Control and Complications Trial	1986		264	North Campus		
	Domenici Center for Health Sciences Education	2006 (expansion in 2009)		200	North Campus	Health Sciences, Bookstore	LEED Gold
	Family Health Clinic	1968		271	North Campus		
	Family Practice Center	1977	Dale Crawford and Assoc.	248	North Campus		NM Society of Architects: Honor Award 1979
	Health Sciences and Services	1988	Holmes, Sabatini, Smith and Eeds	266	North Campus		
	Health Sciences Center University Counsel	1940		232	North Campus		
	Health Sciences Library and Informatics Center	1976	Harvey Hoshour	234	North Campus		NM Society of Architects: Honor Award 1977
	Information Technologies North	2004		255	North Campus		
	Institute for Ethics	1940		225	North Campus		
	KNME Store and Development	1971		265	North Campus	Public TV Offices and Store	
	KNME-TV Studio	1970		217	North Campus	KNME-TV Public TV Studio	
	Mental Health Center			299A–D	North Campus	Psycho Social Rehab	
	Multidisciplinary Research Facility	2008		215	North Campus	Health Science Programs	
	New Mexico Law Center	1974	Robert Walters	230	North Campus		
	North Golf Course Clubhouse	1951	John Gaw Meem	206	North Campus	Clubhouse	
	Novitski Hall	1978	Holmes and Gianinni	249	North Campus	Dental	
	Nursing and Pharmacy	1975	Flatow, Moore, Bryan, and Fairburn	228	North Campus	Nursing and Pharmacy	
	Observatory	1956		208	North Campus		
	Outpatient Surgery and Imaging	2003		283	North Campus		
	Patti Howard Office Building	2001			3500 University Blvd SE		
	Pete and Nancy Domenici Hall	1986	Westwork Architects	260	North Campus	Biomedical Research, Neuroscience	NM Society of Architects: Award of Excellence 1987
	Pharmacy Programs	1940		247	North Campus		
	Planning and Campus Development	1950		203	North Campus		
	Psychiatry	1940		268	North Campus; 35°05′25″N 106°36′52″W		
	Psychology Clinic			192	1820 Sigma Chi Rd NE	Agora Crisis Center	
	Research Incubator Building	2004		205	North Campus		
	Robert Hartung Building	1966 (renovation in 2010)	George Wright and Assoc.	158	2414 Central Ave SE	Film, Digital Media & Theater (originally Architecture)	
	Safety and Risk Services	1975		233	North Campus	Occupational safety	
	School of Medicine Building No.2	1950		201	North Campus	Medical Sciences	
	Service Building	1949		204	North Campus	Physical Plant	
	Southwest Hispanic Research Institute	1955		171	1829 Sigma Chi Rd NE		
	Student Family Housing	1975	Robert Torres	317–329	921-961 Buena Vista SE	Married & Family Housing for students, including graduate students and post-docs	
	Surge Building	1973		226	North Campus	Physician Assistance	
	Telemedicine Program	1953		263	North Campus		
	University of New Mexico Hospital	1954 (additions 1974, 1983, 1991)	Ferguson and Stevens, 1974: Flatow, Moore, Bryan, and Fairburn, 1983: W.C. Kruger and Assoc., 1991: Dean-Kreuger and Assoc.	235	North Campus	University of New Mexico Hospital	
	University Services (Records Management)	1962		262	North Campus; 35°05′37″N 106°37′28″W	Records, postal services, surplus property	
	University Services (Surplus Property)			267	North Campus; 35°06′06″N 106°37′35″W	Recycling & Surplus Property	
	UNM Cancer Center	2009		284	North Campus		LEED Gold
	UNM Dental Clinic	2011		288	North Campus		LEED Gold
	UNM Golf Team Practice Facility				3601 University Blvd SE		
	UNM Hospital Ambulatory Care Center	1989		269	North Campus	UNM Hospital	
	UNM Mental Health Center Programs	1940		246	North Campus		
	UNMH Parking Structure	1995		202	North Campus	Patient parking	
	UNMH Patient Financial Services			278	North Campus	Patient Financial Services, Satellite Coffee	

=== South Campus ===
Image	Name	Built	Architect	Bldg. #	Location	Usage	Awards & Designations
	AIMS@UNM & Hospital Operations			345	35°04′16″N 106°38′00″W		
	Baker Memorial Building	1985		314		Athletic offices	
	Center for High Tech Materials	1997		338		Electronics, Nanotechnology	
	Colleen J. Maloof Administration Building	1966	Joe Boehning	307	35°03′56″N 106°37′46″W	Athletic offices	
	Indoor Practice Facility			354		Athletics	
	Lobo Tennis Club	1981		311		Tennis	
	Lobo Village	2011				Upper Classmen student housing (American Campus Communities)	LEED Green
	Manufacturing Technology and Training Center	1997		341			
	NM Regional Computer Forensics Laboratory	1992		333	35°04′18″N 106°37′54″W		
	Park Center	1992		332		Science and Technology	
	Park North	1995		339		Office and Light Lab Facility	
	Science and Technology Parking Structure	1996		340	35°04′21″N 106°38′00″W	Parking	
	Softball Home Team Facility	1990		343		Softball	
	Student Support and Services Center			346			
	Technology Commercialization Center	1992		334			
	The Pit (originally University Arena)	1966 (expansion in 1975, renovation in 2010)	Joe Boehning	302		Basketball	AIA Albuq. Chapter: Honor Award 1967; AIA Western Mountain Region: Citation 1976; NM Society of Architects Special Award 1977; LEED Silver
	Tow Diehm Athletic Facility	1993		308		Athletics	
	University Stadium	1960 (expansions in 1976 and 2001)	W.C. Kruger and Assoc.	301A–X		Football, Track & Field	
	UNM Press			344		UNM Press	
	UNM/SNL Advanced Materials Laboratory	1992		337			

=== West Campus ===
Image	Name	Built	Architect	Bldg. #	Location	Usage	Awards & Designations
	West Campus Phase I	2009			West Campus (Rio Rancho, New Mexico)	Classrooms	

== Future buildings ==
Building	Estimated completion	Location	Usage	Notes
Center for Collaborative Arts & Technology	2026	Main Campus	Fine Arts	Under construction
Humanities & Social Sciences Center	2028	Main Campus	Humanities	Will replace the old Humanities Building, which is currently being demolished

== Former buildings ==
Image	Building	Built	Demolished	Architect	Bldg. #	Location	Usage
	Aerospace Studies	1940	2023		159	35°05′14″N 106°37′18″W	Air Force ROTC
	Civil Engineering Research Lab	1919	2006	Arno K. Leupold	106	Main Campus	Civil Engineering
	Education Classrooms	1963	2024	Flatow, Moore, Bryan, and Fairburn	67	Main Campus	Education
	Engineering Annex	1937	2006	John Gaw Meem	107	Main Campus	Engineering
	Faculty Club	1930	1997		27	Main Campus	
	Faculty Office Building	1963	2004	Flatow, Moore, Bryan, and Fairburn	63	Main Campus	Education
	Hadley Hall	1900	1910	Edward B. Cristy		Main Campus	Science
	Heating Plant	1905	1979	Edward B. Cristy	80	Main Campus	Utilities
	Hokona Hall	1906	1952	Edward B. Cristy		Main Campus	Residence Hall
	Humanities Building	1974	2025	W. C. Kruger and Associates	81	Main Campus	Humanities, Mathematics
	Kwataka Hall	1906	1957	Edward B. Cristy		Main Campus	Residence Hall
	Parsons Hall	1928	1984	Gaastra, Gladding and Johnson	3	Main Campus	Biology
	Physics and Astronomy	1952	2021	Meem, Zehner and Holien	207	North Campus	
	Rodey Hall	1908	1971	Edward B. Cristy	101	Main Campus	Auditorium
	Santa Ana Hall	1965	2011	William W. Ellison	71	Main Campus	Residence Hall
	Tapy Hall	1954	2008	Meem, Zehner, Holien and Assoc.	118	Main Campus	Civil Engineering
	Wagner Hall	1949	2006	John Gaw Meem / Hugo Zehner and Assoc.	117	Main Campus	Engineering Labs
	Yatoka Hall	1928	1984	Gaastra, Gladding and Johnson	7	Main Campus	Dormitory, Business Administration
	Zimmerman Stadium	1934	1969	John Gaw Meem	52	Main Campus	Football, Track & Field
