= Old St. Joseph Hospital =

- U.S. National Register of Historic Places
- NM State Register of Cultural Properties
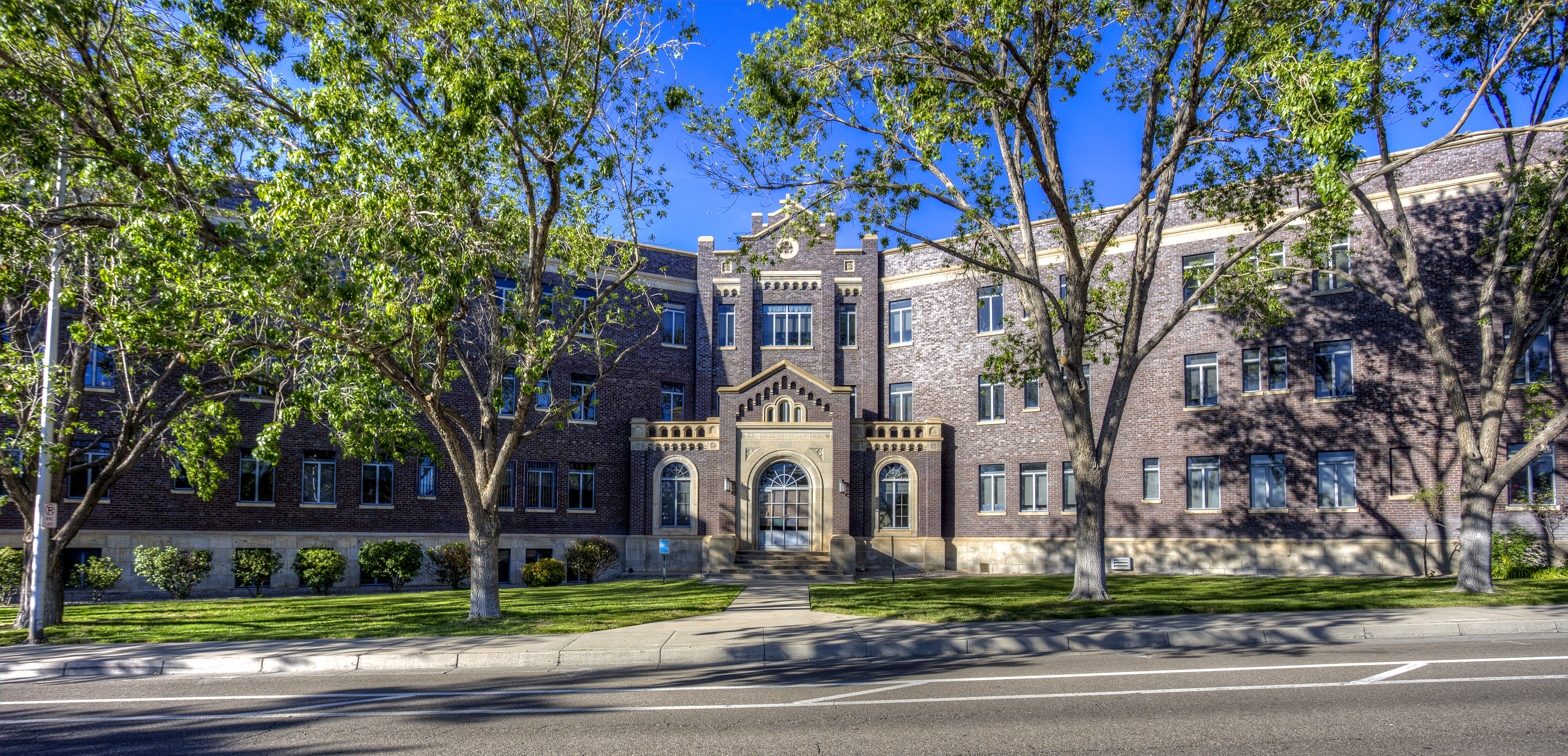
- The hospital in 2024

- Location within New Mexico Location within the United States
- Location: 715 Dr. Martin Luther King Jr. Ave. NE, Albuquerque, New Mexico
- Coordinates: 35°5′9″N 106°38′19″W
- Built: 1929–30
- Architect: W. Miles Brittelle
- Architectural style: Romanesque Revival
- NRHP reference No.: 82003316
- NMSRCP No.: 854

Significant dates
- Added to NRHP: May 27, 1982
- Designated NMSRCP: March 12, 1982

The Old St. Joseph Hospital is a historic hospital building in Albuquerque, New Mexico. It was built in 1929–30 as an expansion of the original St. Joseph Hospital, which opened in 1902. The hospital was run by the Sisters of Charity of Cincinnati and continued to grow with a new 11-story building completed in 1968 that replaced the original 1902 building. In 2002, the hospital was sold due to financial problems and is now part of the Lovelace Health System called Lovelace Medical Center Downtown. The 1930 hospital building was added to the New Mexico State Register of Cultural Properties and the National Register of Historic Places in 1982.

The hospital is a four-story, Y-shaped Romanesque Revival style building constructed from concrete and brown brick. It was designed by local architect W. Miles Brittelle, who at the time was working for the firm of George M. Williamson. Brittelle's other works include the President's House at UNM and the Springer Building, among others. The building was reportedly modeled after a recently completed wing at the Good Samaritan Hospital in Cincinnati, which was also run by the Sisters of Charity. The hospital boasted the latest medical technology, including New Mexico's first baby incubator, and had four operating rooms on the fourth floor along with an emergency operating room on the ground floor. The building also had a specially constructed penthouse for safe storage of x-ray film, intended to prevent another deadly disaster like the Cleveland Clinic fire of 1929.
