= List of colleges and universities in New Mexico =

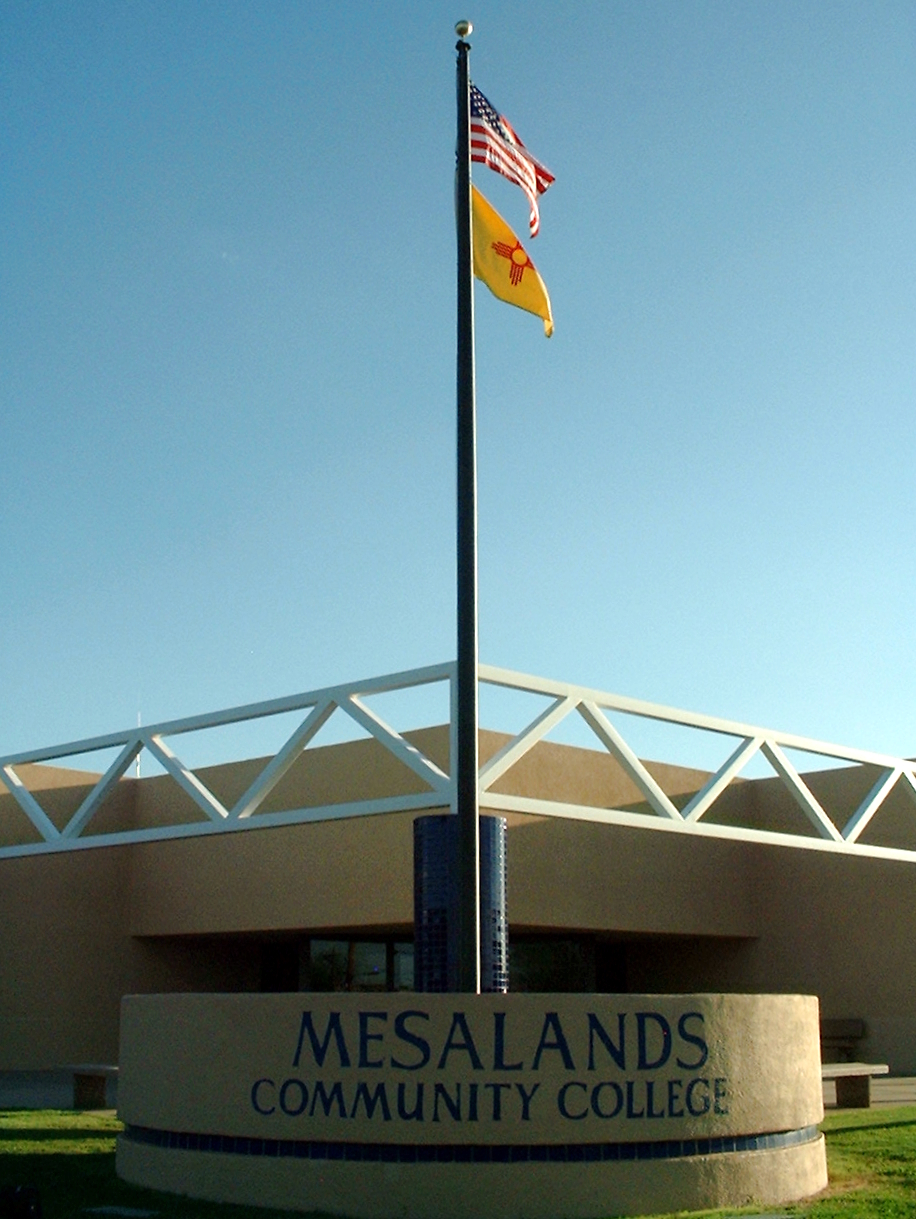
Mesalands Community College in Tucumcari

The U.S. state of New Mexico is home to a variety of public and private colleges and universities. The largest institution is the University of New Mexico (UNM) in Albuquerque, which serves as the state's flagship public university. New Mexico State University (NMSU) in Las Cruces is the state's land-grant university and the New Mexico Institute of Mining and Technology in Socorro specializes in science and engineering. The state's public institutions are overseen by an independent board of regents rather than a single governing system. In addition to these universities, New Mexico has several regional universities and a network of community colleges that provide associate degrees and vocational training.

== Institutions ==
List of colleges and universities in New Mexico
| School | Location(s) (Note: Includes only locations in New Mexico.) | Control | Type | Enrollment (Note: Includes only students enrolled at campuses in New Mexico.) (Fall 2024) | Established (Note: Date founded in New Mexico, moved to New Mexico, or first established a branch campus in New Mexico.) | History |
|---|---|---|---|---|---|---|
| University of New Mexico | Albuquerque (Main): Gallup; Health Sciences Rio Rancho; Los Alamos; Taos; Los Lunas (Valencia) | Public | Research university | 26,977 | 1889 | |
| New Mexico State University | Las Cruces (Main): Alamogordo; Doña Ana; Grants | Public | Research university | 24,514 | 1888 | Las Cruces College (1888–1889); New Mexico College of Agriculture and Mechanic Arts (1889–1960) |
| New Mexico Institute of Mining and Technology | Socorro (Main) | Public | Research university | 1,622 | 1889 | New Mexico School of Mines (1889–1951) |
| University of the Southwest | Hobbs (Main) | Private (Non-denominational) | Doctoral university | 1,130 | 1956 | Hobbs Baptist College (1956–1958); New Mexico Baptist College (1958–1962); College of the Southwest (1962–2008) |
| New Mexico Highlands University | Las Vegas (Main): Farmington; Rio Rancho; Roswell; Santa Fe | Public | Master's university | 2,704 | 1893 | New Mexico Normal School - Las Vegas (1893–1902); New Mexico Normal University (1902–1941) |
| Eastern New Mexico University | Portales (Main): Roswell; Ruidoso | Public | Master's university | 8,580 | 1934 | Eastern New Mexico Junior College (1934–1940); Eastern New Mexico College (1940–1949) |
| Western New Mexico University | Silver City (Main): Deming; Gallup; Lordsburg (Hidalgo Learning Center); Truth or Consequences (Gardner Learning Center) | Public | Master's university | 3,531 | 1893 | New Mexico Normal School - Silver City (1893–1923); New Mexico State Teachers College (1923–1949); New Mexico Western College (1949–1963) |
| Institute of American Indian Arts | Santa Fe (Main) | Tribal | Master's university | 947 | 1962 | |
| Navajo Technical University | Crownpoint (Main): Kirtland Instructional Site; Zuni Instructional Site | Tribal (Navajo Nation) | Master's university | 1,704 | 1979 | Navajo Skill Center (1979–1985); Crownpoint Institute of Technology (1985–2006); Navajo Technical College (2006–2013) |
| St. John's College | Santa Fe (Note: Main campus or headquarters are located outside of New Mexico.) | Private | Master's university | 467 | 1964 | |
| Northern New Mexico College | Española (Main): El Rito | Public | Baccalaureate college | 1,425 | 1909 | Spanish-American Normal School (1909–1953); Northern New Mexico State School (1953–1959); Northern New Mexico College (1959–1970); New Mexico Technical-Vocational School (1970–1976); Northern New Mexico Community College (1976–2005) |
| Brookline College | Albuquerque | Private (for-profit) | Baccalaureate college | 560 | 2002 | |
| Central New Mexico Community College | Albuquerque (Main): Rio Rancho | Public | Associate's college | 19,342 | 1964 | Technical Vocational Institute (1964–2006) |
| Clovis Community College | Clovis (Main) | Public | Associate's college | 2,342 | 1991 | Clovis Branch of Eastern New Mexico University (1969–1991) |
| Luna Community College | Las Vegas (Main): Mora; Santa Rosa; Springer | Public | Associate's college | 743 | 1969 | Luna Area Vocational Technical School (1969–2000) |
| Mesalands Community College | Tucumcari (Main) | Public | Associate's college | 563 | 1979 | Tucumcari Area Vocational School (1979–1994); Mesa Technical College (1994–2001) |
| New Mexico Junior College | Hobbs (Main) | Public | Associate's college | 2,235 | 1965 | |
| San Juan College | Farmington (Main): Aztec (East Campus); Kirtland (West Campus) | Public | Associate's college | 6,452 | 1982 | Farmington Branch of New Mexico State University (1956–1958); San Juan Branch of New Mexico State University (1958–1982) |
| Santa Fe Community College | Santa Fe (Main) | Public | Associate's college | 4,469 | 1983 | |
| Southeast New Mexico College | Carlsbad | Public | Associate's college | 1,431 | 1950 | New Mexico State University Carlsbad |
| Southwestern Indian Polytechnic Institute | Albuquerque (Main) | Public (Bureau of Indian Affairs) | Associate's college | 215 | 1971 | |
| Carrington College | Albuquerque | Private (for-profit) | Associate's college | 357 | 1967 | |
| New Mexico Military Institute | Roswell (Main) | Public | Military junior college | 463 | 1891 | Goss Military Institute (1891–1893) |
| Southwestern College | Santa Fe (Main) | Private | Special-focus institution | 289 | 1976 | Quimby College (1976–ca. 1980) |
| Pima Medical Institute | Albuquerque: Rio Rancho (Albuquerque West) | Private (for-profit) | Special-focus institution | 562 | 1972 | |
| Burrell College of Osteopathic Medicine | Las Cruces (Main) | Private (for-profit) | Special-focus institution (Medical school) | 841 | 2013 | |

=== Other institutions ===
- Diné College
- Southern Methodist University, Taos campus
- Trinity Southwest University

== Former institutions ==
List of former colleges and universities in New Mexico
| School | Location(s) | Control | Type | Established | Closed (Note: Date closed in New Mexico, left New Mexico, or closed last branch campus in New Mexico.) | History |
|---|---|---|---|---|---|---|
| National American University | Albuquerque (Albuquerque East) (Note: Main campus or headquarters were located outside of New Mexico.); Rio Rancho (Albuquerque West). | Private (for-profit) | Doctoral university | ca. 1975 | 2019 | |
| University of Albuquerque | Albuquerque (Main) | Private (Archdiocese of Santa Fe) | Master's university | 1920 | 1986 | St. Francis Summer College (1920–1940); Catholic Teachers' College of New Mexico (1940–1950); College of St. Joseph on the Rio Grande (1950–1966) |
| ITT Technical Institute | Albuquerque | Private (for-profit) | Master's university | | 2016 | |
| College of Artesia | Artesia (Main) | Private | Baccalaureate college | 1966 | 1971 | |
| Santa Fe University of Art and Design | Santa Fe (Main): Albuquerque (Note: Operated during the College of Santa Fe on the former campus of the University of Albuquerque.) | Private (for-profit) (Note: Operated in for-profit status as the Santa Fe University of Art and Design.) | Baccalaureate college | 1859 | 2018 | St. Michael's College (1859–1966); College of the Christian Brothers of New Mexico (fl. 1874); College of Santa Fe (1966–2010) |
| International Business College | Alamogordo; Albuquerque; Las Cruces | Private (for-profit) | Associate's college | | 2007 | |
| Western Business Institute | Alamogordo (Note: Operated as a companion institution to Western Technical Institute in El Paso, Texas.) | Private (for-profit) | Associate's college | 1994 | 1996 | |
| Insight University | Santa Fe (Main) | Private | Special-focus institution | 2011 | 2017 | |
| Albuquerque Bible College and Graduate Theological Institute | Albuquerque (Main) | Private (Non-denominational) | Special-focus institution (Bible college) | 1988 | 2003 | |
| Artesia Christian College | Artesia (Main) | Private (Non-denominational) | Special-focus institution (Bible college) | 1975 | 1985 | |
| Albuquerque Business College | Albuquerque (Main) | | | 1903 | ca. 1980 | |
| Anamarc College | Santa Teresa | | | | 2014 | |
| ATI Career Training Center | Albuquerque | Private (for-profit) | | | 2012 | |
| Brown Mackie College | Albuquerque | Private (for-profit) | | 2010 | 2017 | |
| AAA Colleges (Note: Also operated as AAA Business College in Albuquerque.) | Albuquerque | Private (for-profit) | | | 1984 | |
| Collins College (Note: Known as Al Collins Graphic Design School when operated in New Mexico.) | | Private (for-profit) | | | 1995 | |
| Southwest University of Visual Arts | Albuquerque | Private | Master's university | 1983 | 2020 | |

== See also ==
- List of University of New Mexico buildings
- Higher education in the United States
- List of American institutions of higher education
- List of college athletic programs in New Mexico
- List of colleges and universities
- List of colleges and universities by country
- List of recognized higher education accreditation organizations
- List of tribal colleges and universities
