= Central Receiving Building =

- U.S. National Register of Historic Places
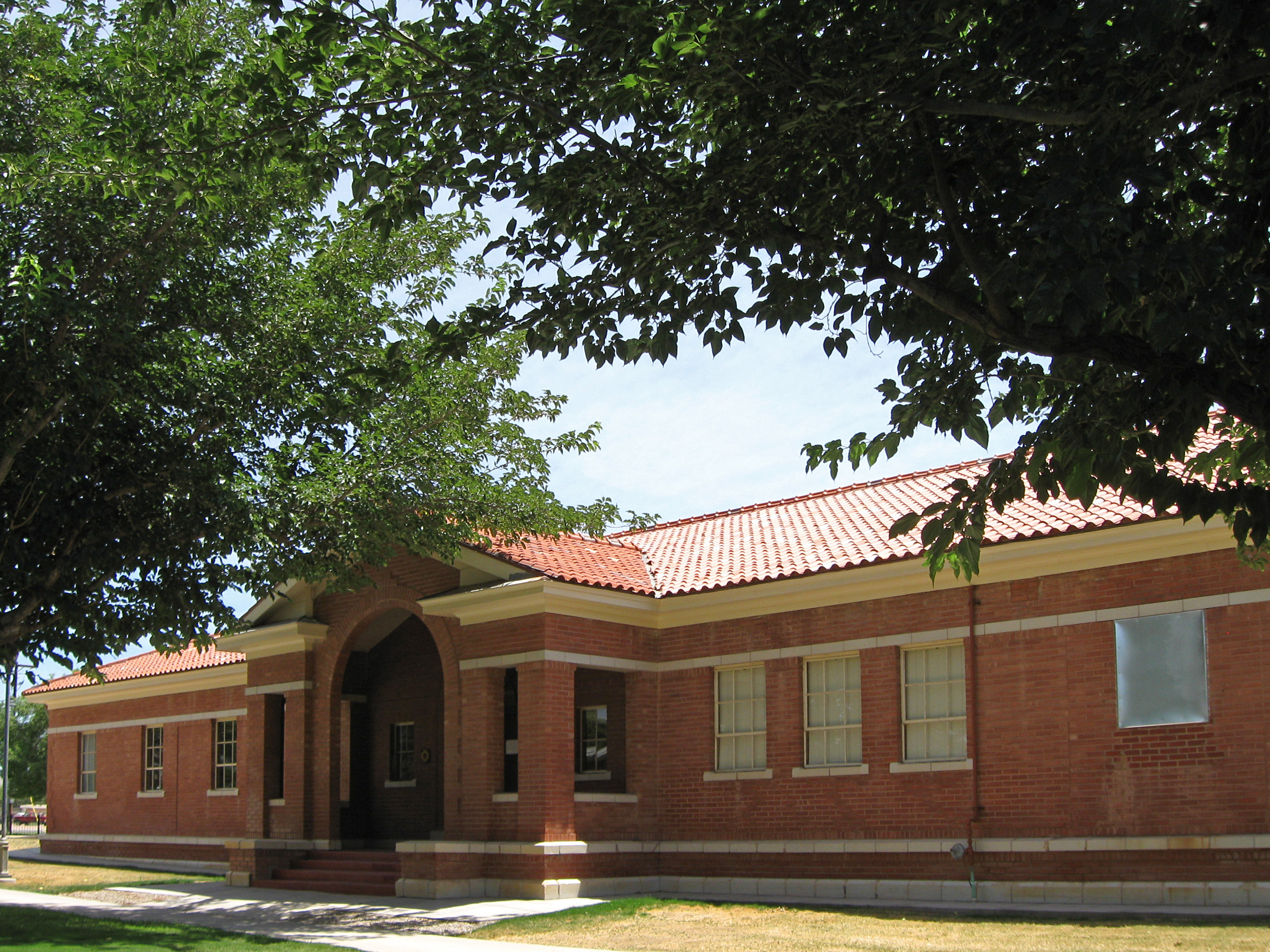

- Location within New Mexico
- Location: 1900 N. White Sands Blvd., NMSVH, Alamogordo, New Mexico
- Coordinates: 32°54′51″N 105°57′29″W
- Area: 0.2 acres (0.081 ha)
- Built: 1938
- Architect: Brittelle and Ginner
- Architectural style: Decorative Brick
- MPS: New Mexico Campus Buildings Built 1906--1937 TR
- NRHP reference No.: 88001566
- Added to NRHP: May 16, 1989

The Central Receiving Building of the New Mexico School for the Blind and Visually Impaired, at 1900 N. White Sands Blvd., in Alamogordo, New Mexico, was built in 1938. It was listed on the National Register of Historic Places in 1989.

It was designed by Brittelle and Ginner. Per its nomination: "The Central Receiving Building is one of three buildings on the campus of NMSVH constructed in the Decorative Brick style between 1930 and 1938. Not found on other New Mexico campuses, this style had been employed in 1930 by George Williamson for the nominated Auditorium and Recreation building. As used on this campus the style is closely related to the Mediterranean-style designs of Trost and Trost exemplified by the nominated Administration building, and represents a continuation of Williamson's interpretation of the pattern set for the campus by Trost. Like the 1936 Infirmary, this building represents a continuity of architects in that both Brittelle and Ginner worked for Williamson, and Brittelle had been in business with Trost. The building originally housed a swimming pool which may have been the first indoor pool in New Mexico."
