= Brown Hall =

Brown Hall may refer to:

- Brown Hall (Georgia Tech), Atlanta, Georgia
- Brown's Hall-Thompson's Opera House, Pioche, Nevada, listed on the National Register of Historic Places in Nevada
- Brown Hall (Socorro, New Mexico), listed on the National Register of Historic Places in Socorro County, New Mexico
- Brown Hall (Barnard, South Dakota), listed on the National Register of Historic Places in Brown County, South Dakota

== See also ==
- Williamsburg Bray School in Virginia, called Brown Hall after 1920s
