= Jay Kinsbruner =

American historian of Latin America (1939–2007)

Jay Kinsbruner (1939–2007) was a professor and professor emeritus of history at Queens College, City University of New York.

Kinsbruner worked initially on early national Chile, but subsequently studied Latin American independence processes with a comparative approach.

== Publications ==
- Diego Portales: Interpretative Essays on the Man and Times (Martinus Nijhoff, 1967)
- Bernardo O'Higgins (Twayne Publishers, 1968)
- The Spanish-American Independence Movement (Dryden Press 1973)
- Chile: A Historical Interpretation (Harper & Row, 1974)
- Independence in Spanish America: Civil Wars, Revolutions, and Underdevelopment (University of New Mexico Press, 1994)
- Petty Capitalism in Spanish America: The Pulperos of Puebla, Mexico City, Caracas, and Buenos Aires (Westview Press, 1987)
- Not of Pure Blood: The Free People of Color and Racial Prejudice in Nineteenth-Century Puerto Rico (Duke University Press, 1996)
- The Colonial Spanish-American City: Urban Life in the Age of Atlantic Capitalism (University of Texas Press, 2005)

He also edited the second edition of the Encyclopedia of Latin American History and Culture, with over 3,000 articles.
