= Miles Brittelle =

American architect

William Miles Brittelle (April 13, 1894 – January 7, 1970) was an American architect who practiced in Albuquerque, New Mexico, including with John J. Ginner as part of Brittelle & Ginner.

At least three of his works are listed on the National Register of Historic Places (NRHP).

== Biography ==
Brittellle was born in Imperial, Nebraska, on April 13, 1894, and later moved to Colorado. He served in World War I with the 115th Trench Mortar Battery. After the war, he trained as an architect, working in firms in Denver and Pueblo, Colorado. In 1926, he moved to Albuquerque, New Mexico.

In Albuquerque, Brittelle worked in the firm of George M. Williamson, then formed a local partnership with the El Paso based firm Trost & Trost from 1931 to 1932. His most notable work with Trost & Trost was the El Fidel Hotel in Albuquerque, which opened in 1932.

In 1931, when New Mexico started requiring licensing for architects, Governor Arthur Seligman appointed Brittelle to the first Board of Architectural Examiners in New Mexico and he was elected chairman. He held New Mexico architect license number 2. He also served as president of the New Mexico chapter of the American Institute of Architects.

In 1933, he started his own firm, Brittelle & Wilson, which became Brittelle & Ginner in 1934. Brittelle and Ginner were "among the earliest architects working in the Modernist movement" in Albuquerque.

Brittelle died on January 7, 1970, in Albuquerque, New Mexico, and was buried in Sunset Memorial Park in Albuquerque.

== Works ==
Works include (with shared attribution indicated):

- With George M. Williamson:
  - Old St. Joseph Hospital (1930), Albuquerque. NRHP-listed.
  - President's House (1930), University of New Mexico, Albuquerque. NRHP-listed.
  - Springer Building (1930), Albuquerque. NRHP-listed.
- With Trost & Trost:
  - El Fidel Hotel (1932), Albuquerque
- Brittelle & Wilson:
  - Occidental Life Building reconstruction (1934), Albuquerque. NRHP-listed.
- Brittelle & Ginner:
  - Fitch Hall (1937), New Mexico Institute of Mining and Technology, Socorro, New Mexico. NRHP-listed.
  - Central Receiving Building (1938), New Mexico School for the Blind and Visually Impaired, Alamogordo, New Mexico. NRHP-listed.
  - Sunset Mausoleum (1961), Albuquerque

The papers of the firm are archived with the Center for Southwest Research, at the University of New Mexico, as "Brittelle, Ginner and Associates Architectural Drawings and Plans".

== See also ==
- List of American architects
