= Emma Estabrook =

US author and academic

Emma Franklin Estabrook (1865 – January 24, 1962) was a scholar and writer who wrote on Native American subjects including the Pueblo. Her book Givers of Life was published by the University of New Mexico Press. The Autry Museum of the American West has a collection of her papers.

She was involved in discussions of how Native American dance rituals were described.

Her 1932 book was unfavorably welcomed in one review. Another review was more favorable.

== Bibliography ==
- Givers of Life: The American Indians as Contributors to Civilization (1932) University of New Mexico Press, illustrated
- The American Desert (1946)
- The American Desert, and songs of light (1952) poetry
- My Life in Two Centuries (1955)
- Ancient Lovers of Peace (1959)
