= Fitch Hall =

- U.S. National Register of Historic Places
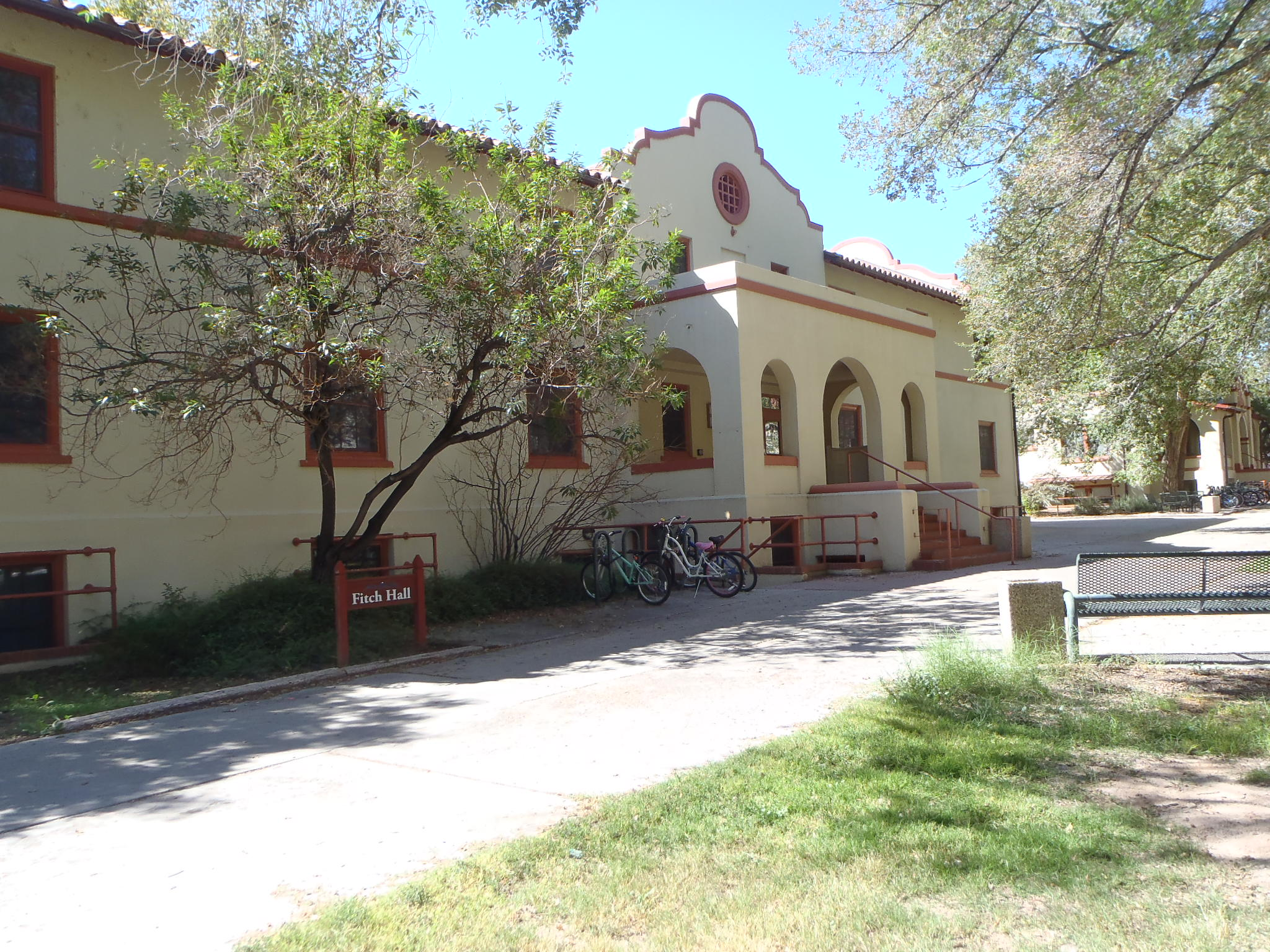

- Location within New Mexico
- Location: New Mexico Institute of Mining and Technology, Socorro, New Mexico
- Coordinates: 34°03′55″N 106°54′15″W
- Area: 0.1 acres (0.040 ha)
- Built: 1937
- Architect: Brittelle & Ginner
- Architectural style: Mission/spanish Revival, California Mission Revival
- MPS: New Mexico Campus Buildings Built 1906--1937 TR
- NRHP reference No.: 88001551
- Added to NRHP: May 16, 1989

Fitch Hall, at the New Mexico Institute of Mining and Technology in Socorro, New Mexico, was built in 1937. It was listed on the National Register of Historic Places in 1989.

It is a dormitory built of stuccoed masonry. It is rectangular with, projecting from the front, a one-story entry porch that has a flat roof and arched openings. It is California Mission Revival in style. It has curvilinear gables at the buildings' sides. Its roof is covered with mission tile.

It was designed by architects Brittelle & Ginner Brittelle and Ginner

Architecture: Mission/Spanish Revival architecture, California Mission Revival architecture

It was built to serve as a dormitory and was still being used as such in 1987. It now houses the offices of the institute's Department of Communication, Liberal Arts, and Social Sciences as well as the Writing and Communication Lab.
