= Connor Hall (Santa Fe, New Mexico) =

Historic building

- U.S. National Register of Historic Places
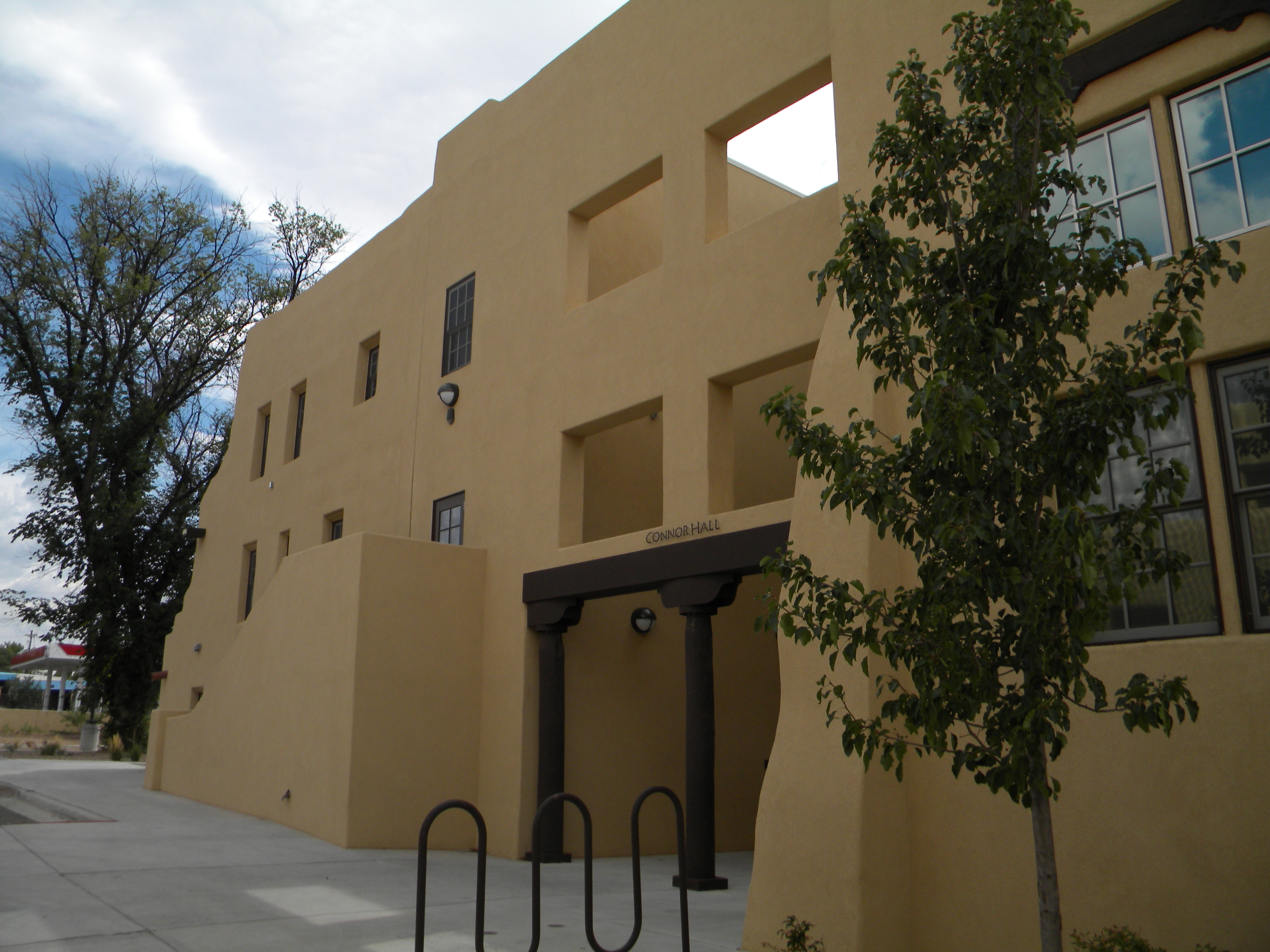

- Location within New Mexico Location within the United States
- Location: 1060 Cerrillos Rd., NMSD, Santa Fe, New Mexico
- Coordinates: 35°40′34″N 105°57′25″W
- Area: 0.7 acres (0.28 ha)
- Built: 1927-28, 1956-57, 1978
- Architect: George M. Williamson, Charles Nolan
- Architectural style: Pueblo Revival
- MPS: New Mexico Campus Buildings Built 1906--1937 TR
- NRHP reference No.: 88001561
- Added to NRHP: September 22, 1988

Connor Hall in Santa Fe, New Mexico is a Pueblo Revival-style building which was constructed in 1927 and 1928. Located at 1060 Cerrillos Rd., New Mexico School for the Deaf, it was listed on the National Register of Historic Places in 1988.

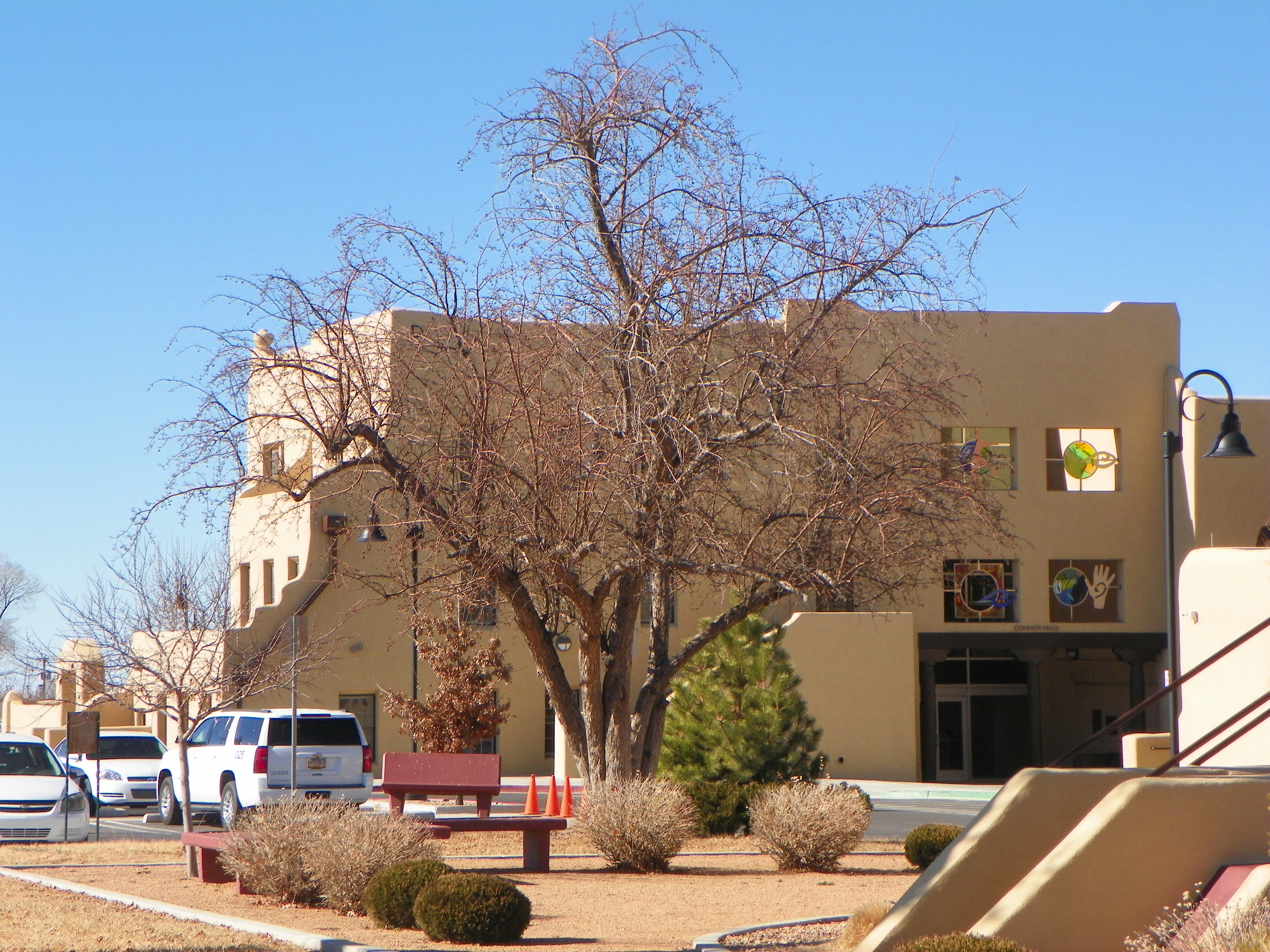

It was designed by architect George Williamson as an L-shaped building to serve as a dormitory. It is a three-story masonry and stucco building. It has "with irregular stepped massing, recessed fenestration, a flat roof and rounded parapets," and a recessed entryway "under a buttressed mission-like arch." Its bricks were made at the New Mexico State Penitentiary in Santa Fe.

The building was expanded to the rear in 1956 and 1957. It underwent a complete renovation in 1978 to plans by architect Charles Nolan.

The building was in use as a dormitory in 1987.
