= Mesalands Community College =

Public community college in Tucumcari, New Mexico, U.S.

Coordinates: 35.1704°N 103.7356°W

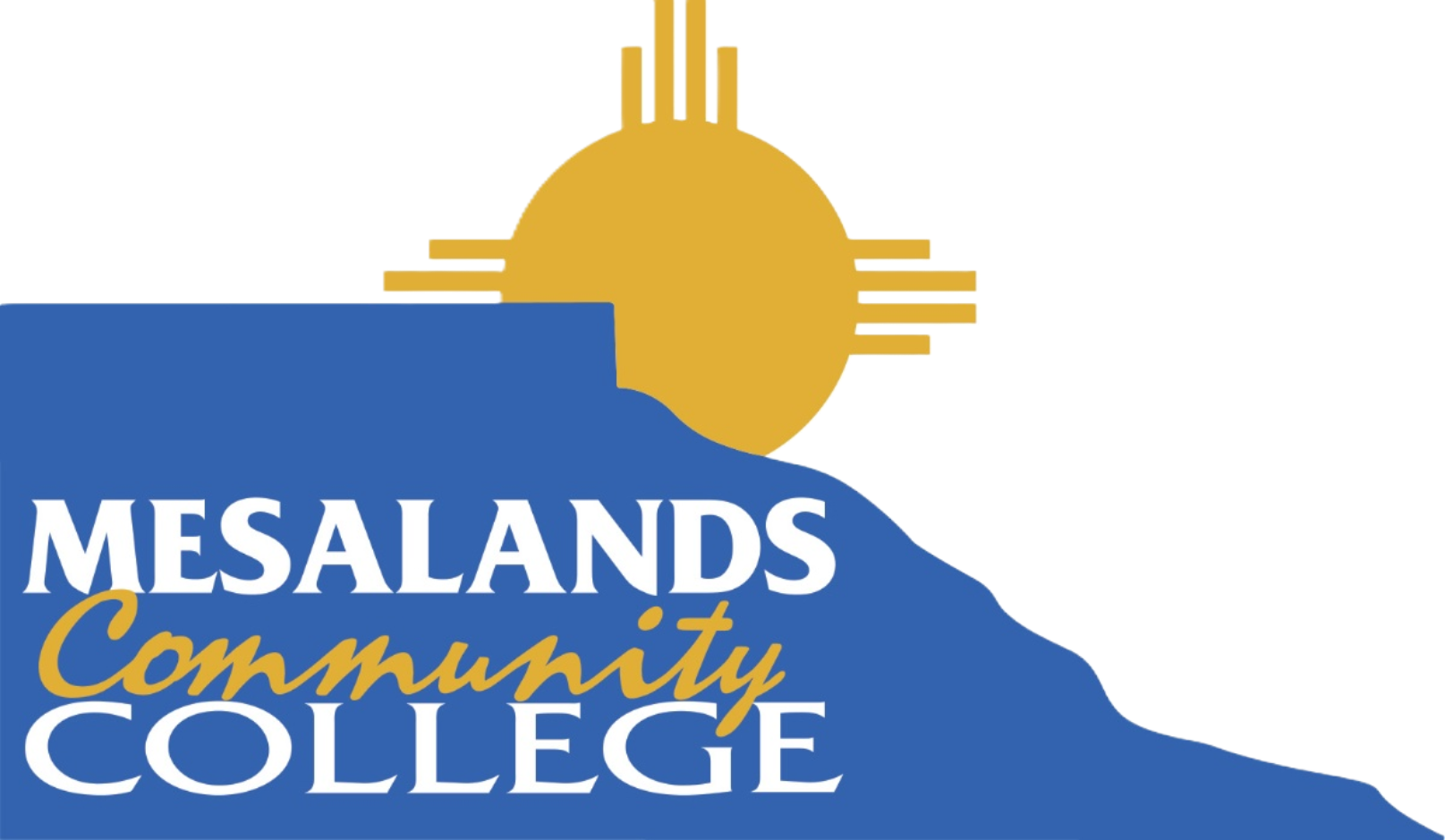
- Type: Public community college
- Established: 1979
- Students: 1,700
- Location: Tucumcari, New Mexico, U.S.
- Nickname: Stampede
- Mascot: Petey (Bull)
- Website: www.mesalands.edu

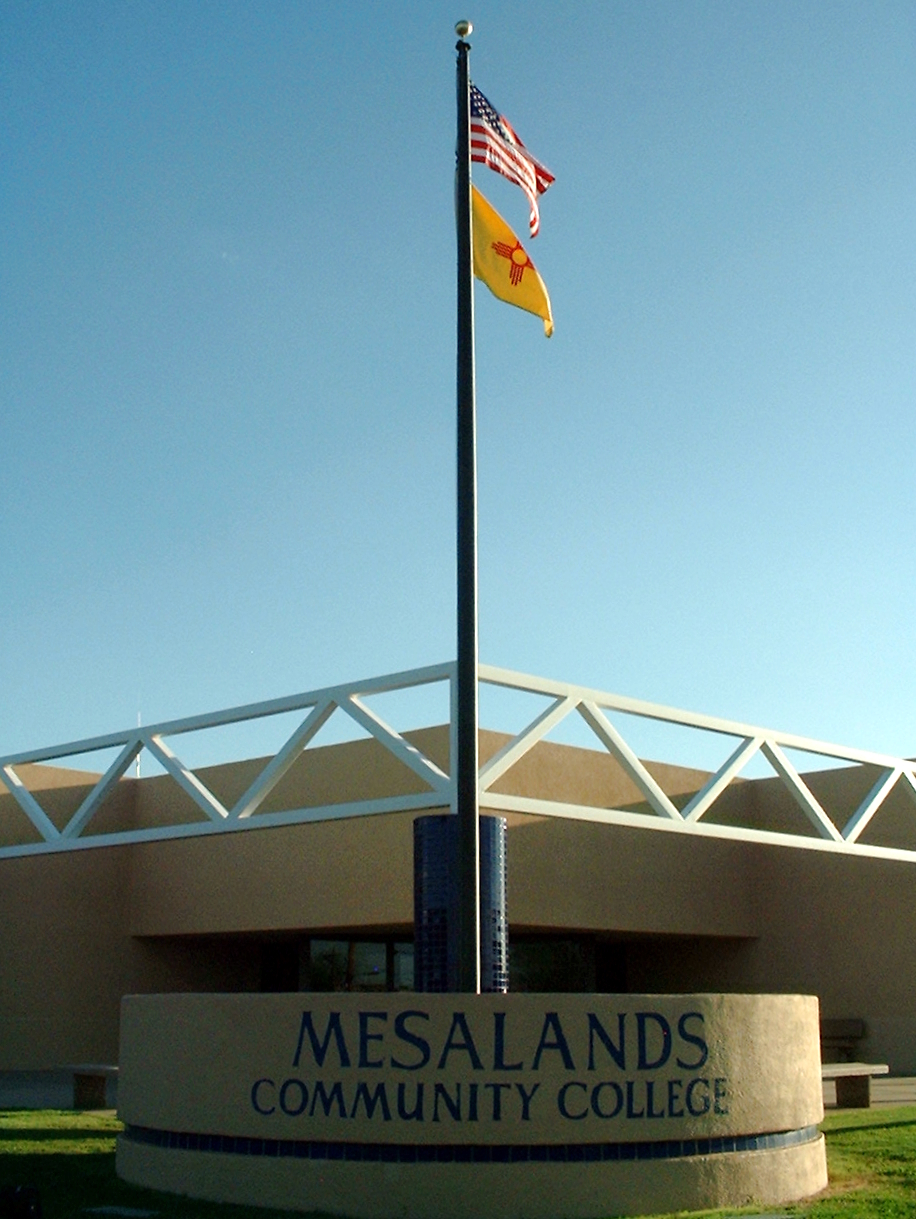
Mesalands Community College main building

Mesalands Community College, is a public community college in Tucumcari, New Mexico. It is also the home of the North American Wind Research and Training Center and the Mesalands Stampede Intercollegiate Rodeo Team.

Originally known as Tucumcari Area Vocational School, it was established in 1979.

Although the college is accredited by the Higher Learning Commission, it was placed on probation in February 2024 for not meeting HLC criteria related to ethical behavior and financial management.

== Collaboration with Sandia National Laboratories ==
On April 14, 2009, Mesalands Community College and Sandia National Laboratories signed a memorandum of understanding allowing the college's North American Wind Research and Training Center and the lab to collaborate on such projects as turbine operations and maintenance, reliability of turbine components, and repair methods. It is the first memo of its kind between a national laboratory and a two-year college.

== Gallery ==
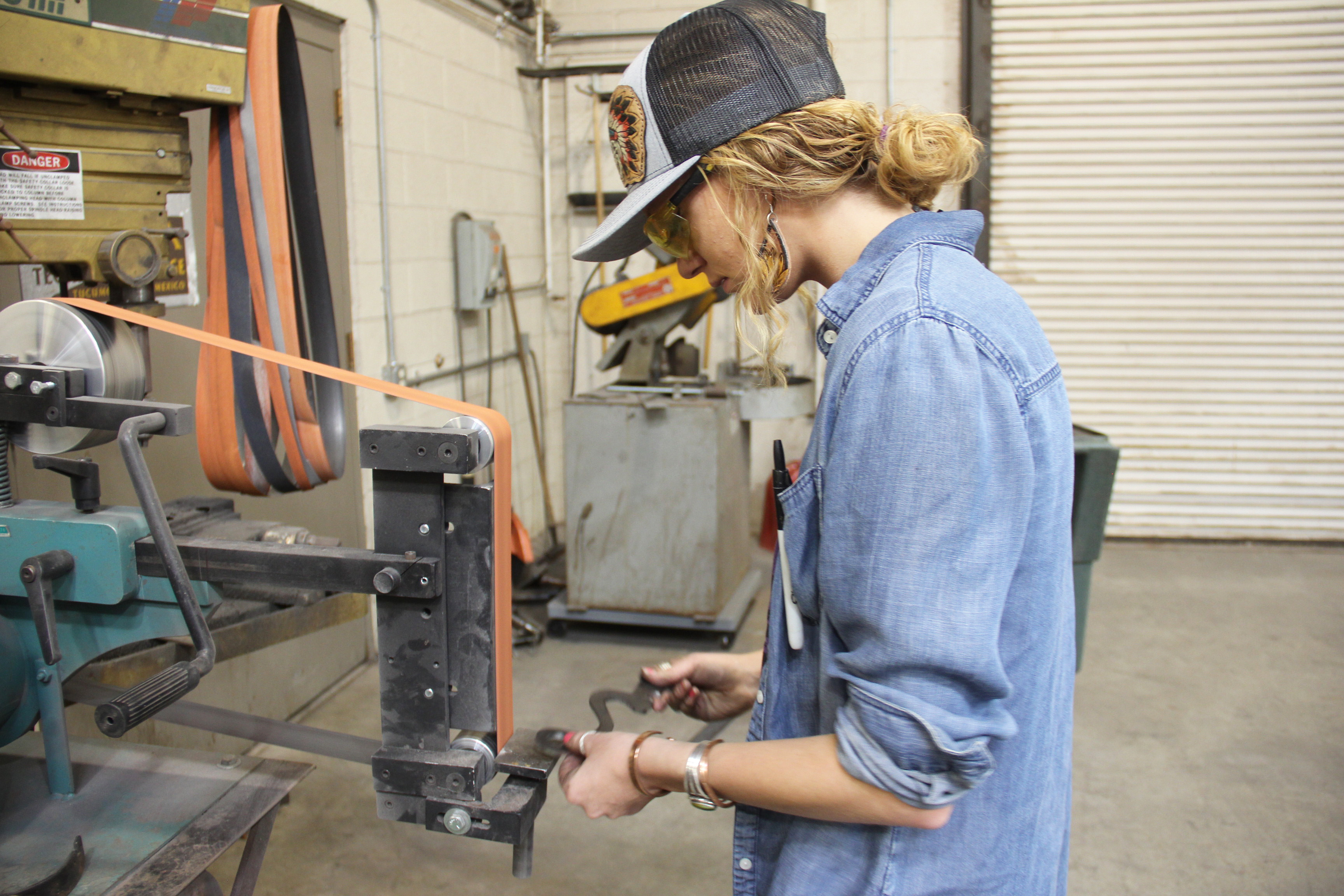

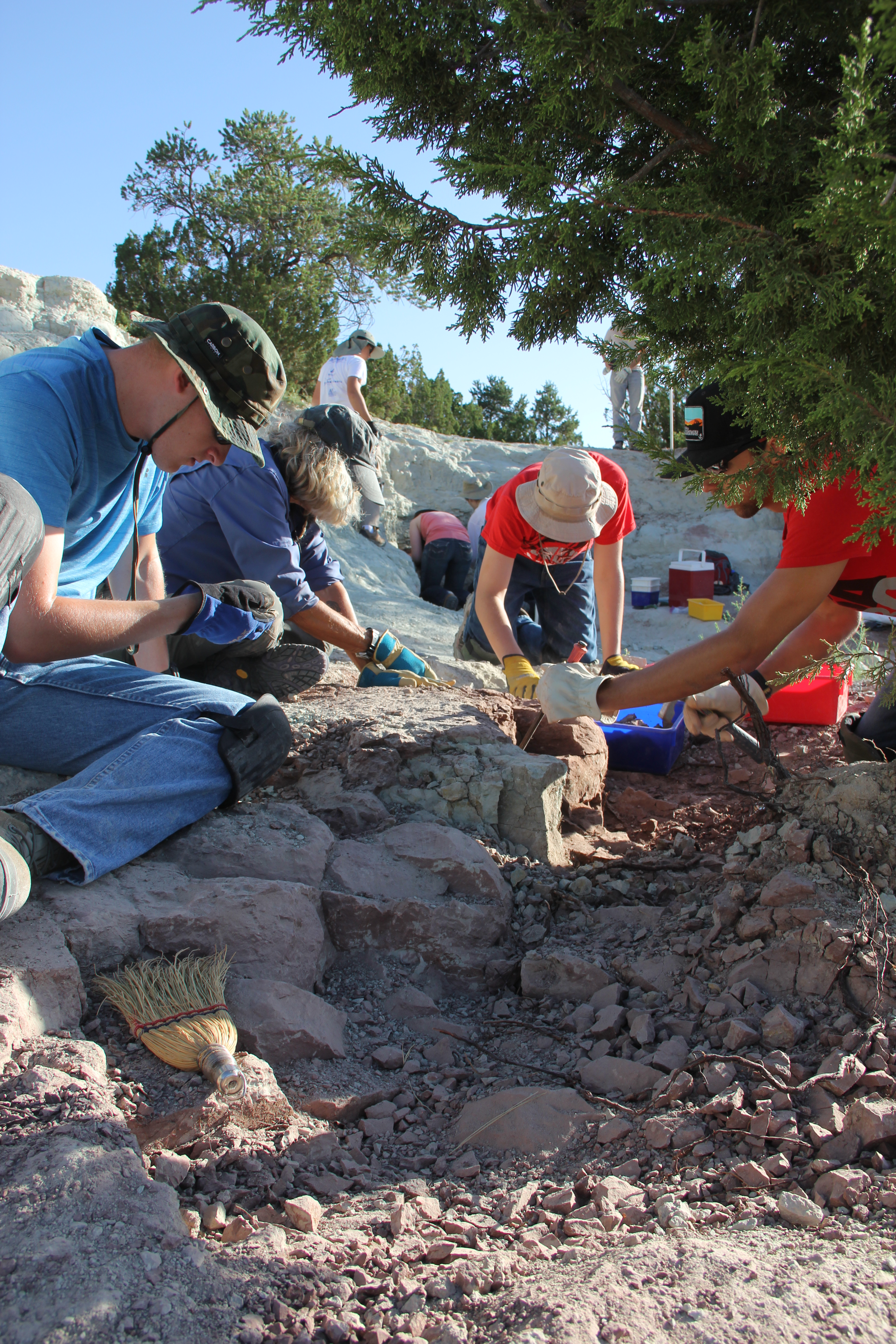

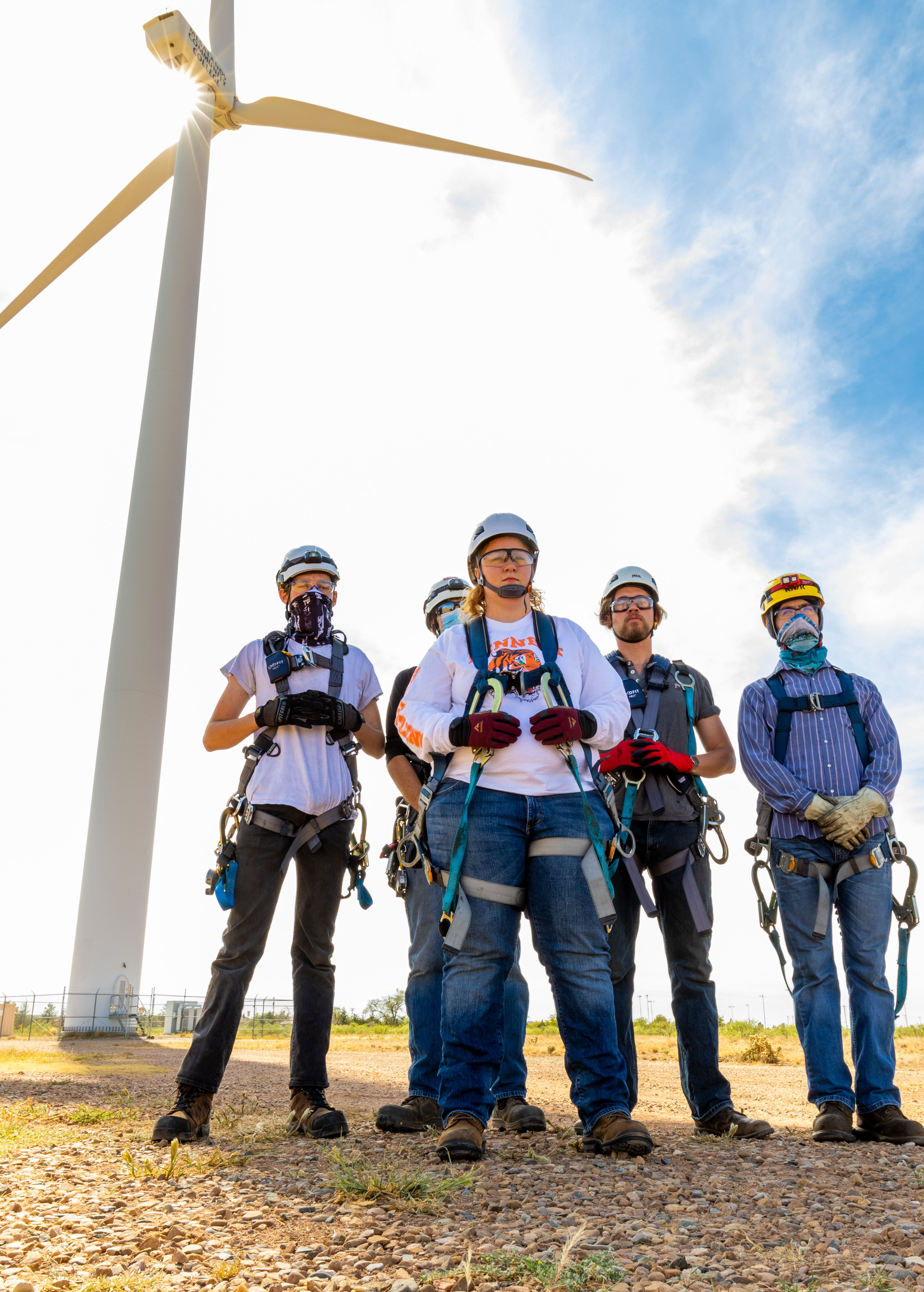
