= Springer Building =

- U.S. National Register of Historic Places
- NM State Register of Cultural Properties
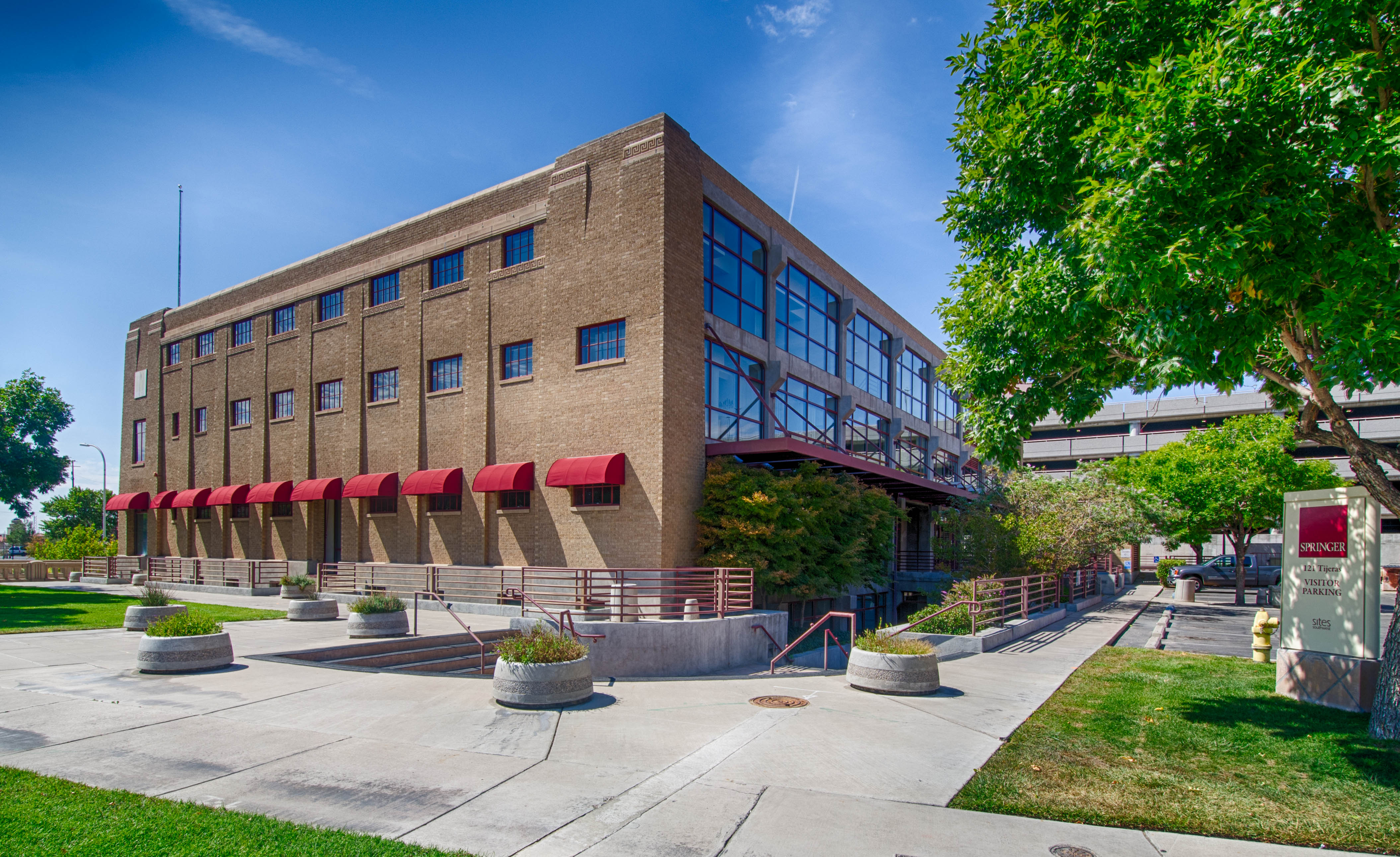

- Location within New Mexico Location within the United States
- Location: 121 Tijeras Ave., NE, Albuquerque, New Mexico
- Coordinates: 35°5′9″N 106°38′43″W
- Area: less than one acre
- Built: 1929-30
- Architect: Miles Brittelle, Sr.
- Architectural style: Mayan Temple
- NRHP reference No.: 80002547
- NMSRCP No.: 785

Significant dates
- Added to NRHP: November 18, 1980
- Designated NMSRCP: September 16, 1980

The Springer Building is a historic building in Albuquerque, New Mexico. It was built during 1929–30 and was listed on the National Register of Historic Places in 1980.

It was designed by the Springer Transfer Company, including architect Miles Brittelle, Sr. Another architect, George M. Williamson, designed a different office and storage facility for the Springer Transfer Company, with access to the Santa Fe railway line.

The architect took advantage of massing and structure required to give the Springer Building, with slight adjustments, a Mayan architecture motif.
