= University of New Mexico Press =

University press publisher of the University of New Mexico

- Parent company: University of New Mexico
- Founded: 1929
- Country of origin: United States
- Headquarters location: Albuquerque, New Mexico
- Distribution: Simon & Schuster(United States); Codasat (Canada); Eurospan Group (EMEA)
- Publication types: Books, Printed and Digital
- Official website: unmpress.com

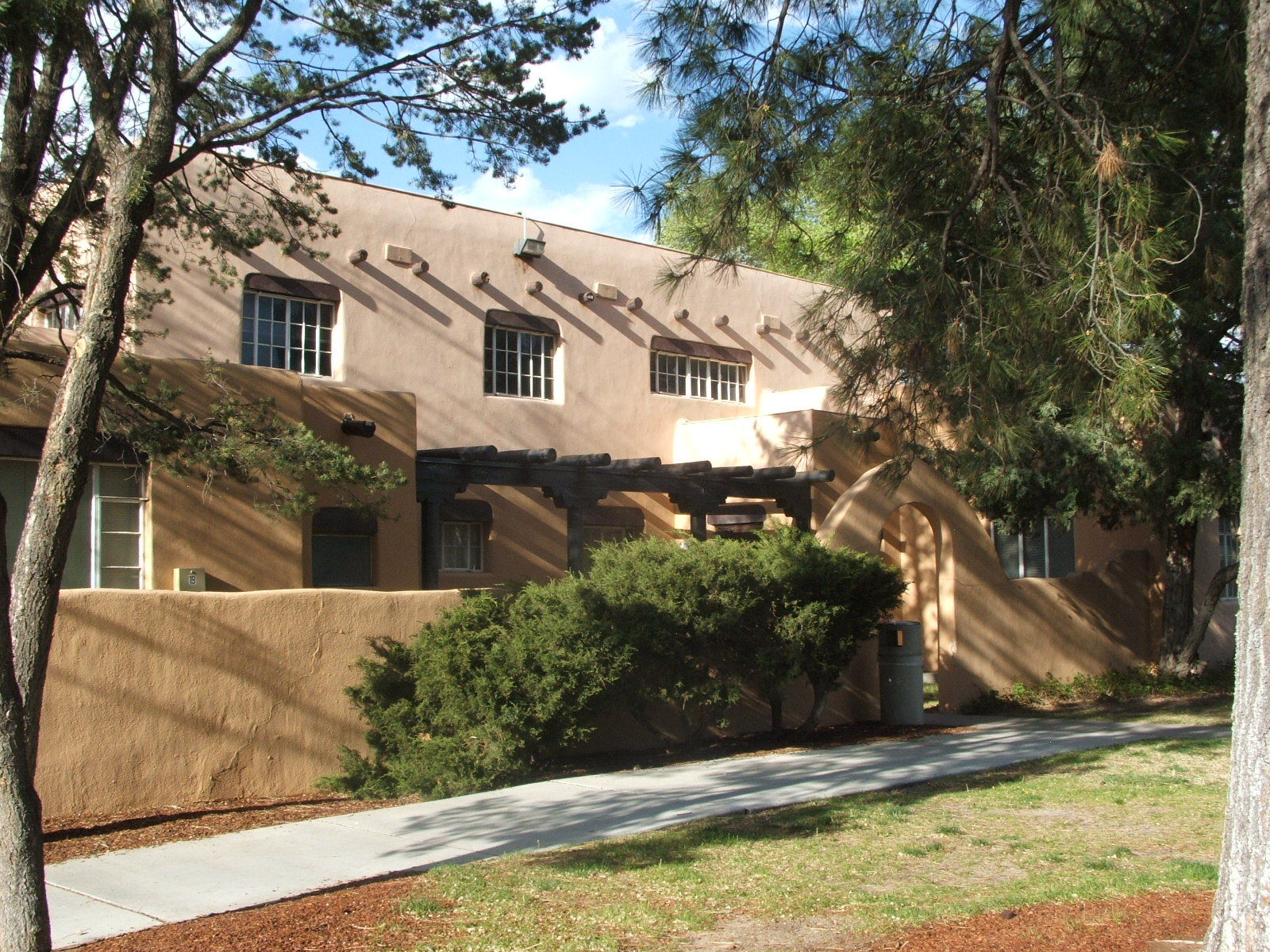
The Office of Research, which houses the administrative offices

The University of New Mexico Press (UNMP) is a university press at the University of New Mexico. It was founded in 1929 and published pamphlets for the university in its early years before expanding into quarterlies and books. Its administrative offices are in the Office of Research (Building 26), on the campus of UNM in Albuquerque.

The University of New Mexico Press specializes in scholarly and trade books on subjects including Southwestern and Western American history and literature, archaeology and anthropology, Latin American and border studies, Native American studies, travel and recreation, and children's books. UNM Press publishes the Dialagos Series in Latin American Studies, the Mary Burritt Christiansen Poetry Series, and the Barbara Guth Worlds of Wonder Science Series for Young Readers.

== The early years ==
On June 1, 1929, the Board of Regents of the University of New Mexico unanimously approved the establishment of the University of New Mexico Press (UNMP). At the time, the university enrolled about 1,000 students. The inaugural publications produced by the press were pamphlets. It does not appear that when the press was founded the Regents had plans other than for the press to serve the university community by printing and distributing pamphlets, reports, and journals. The university printing plant and publishing arm were one entity, and for its first three years, UNMP was a printing facility for the university.

On July 15, 1930, Stanford-educated Paul A.F. Walter Jr., son of Santa Fe newspaperman Paul A. F. Walter Sr. became the first director of UNMP. Leaving his post as editor of the Roswell Morning Dispatch, Walter moved to Santa Fe, where he was also assistant director of the Museum of New Mexico and the School of American Research. The School of American Research and UNM jointly paid his salary for his cooperative job assignment. In August 1930, at the annual meeting of the boards of the Museum of New Mexico and the School of American Research, Walter was authorized to move his father's printing plant for the periodical El Palacio to UNM campus. On August 13, 1930, the machinery was moved. In 1930, four publications were issued; in 1931, the number increased to ten, and in 1932, seven. These booklets were part of the "Bulletins Series", and featured studies by archaeology, education, geology, and engineering faculty at UNM, among others. The booklets sold for $.25 per copy, and UNMP housed stock and filled orders, though no marketing was done for these publications. Because early publications were printed by the UNMP plant, the copyright page often listed "University of New Mexico Press" as the publisher. The first hardcover, bound full-length book, was New Mexico History and Civics, by Lansing Bloom and Thomas Donnelly was published in September, 1933. The first book from UNMP printing facilities was Givers of Life by Emma Estabrook, though the first book considered a UNMP book (advertised, cataloged, and distributed) is New Mexico History and Civics.

In its early years, the press published the New Mexico Quarterly, a literary publication, and the New Mexico Historical Review. It continued to publish Walter's El Palacio.

== The Great Depression and war years ==
Fred E. Harvey was hired as director in 1933, as Walter left to complete his Ph.D. and become the founding faculty member of UNM's sociology department. Under Harvey, the press began publishing its first hardcover books. The best-seller for this era was Practical Spoken Spanish by Arthur L. Campa and F.M. Kercheville, published in 1934, and still in print today.

The first press minutes on file are from the Committee on Publications meeting of April 20, 1937. The committee consisted of "Bloom, Brand, Harvey, Pearce, Seyfried, John D. Clark, Popejoy, and Hammond" and was the editorial board of the press. The committee received, discussed, and sent manuscripts out for critical review. The board also set the production budget. For the fiscal year 1937–1938, the printing budget was $6,000 and covered printing six University course catalogs and twelve faculty Bulletins, in addition to UNMP books. Also in 1937, UNMP joined the organization now known as the Association of University Presses. During at least one year of the Depression era, no funds were available to pay press employees during the summer months. Director Harvey told the Albuquerque Journal that the staff had agreed to work without pay until enough books were sold to compensate them. Harvey himself filled his car with books and sold them to bookstores and schools throughout New Mexico during these tough times.

In 1940, the press was involved in celebrating the four hundredth anniversary of the Coronado expedition to New Mexico. A statewide commission was set up to handle the celebration, and the Coronado Historical Fund, with federal and state moneys was established. Two series of books, later published by UNMP, were planned. The first—the Coronado Historical Series—consisted of ten titles authored by notable historians like Herbert E. Bolton, George P. Hammond, and Frances V. Scholes. The second series was an anthropological series that contained a two-volume set titled Pioneers in Anthropology.

At the start of World War II the university was still relatively small. In the fall of 1943, university president Zimmerman, in assessing the work of various departments at UNM, asked Joseph A. Brandt, then director of the University of Chicago Press, to visit UNMP and submit suggestions for improvement. Brandt had been prime in launching the University of Oklahoma Press in 1928, and was a dynamic figure in university press publishing during this period. Brandt wrote a four-page letter to Zimmerman in June 1944, praising the university for its press. He recommended a larger staff and subsidy and better equipment for the printing plant. Other suggestions included a focus on furthering the understanding of New Mexico citizens and their history and economics; a publishing schedule of six to ten new books to be published in two seasons each year; and a publishing proposal to accompany each book with reports from a qualified reader, a market estimate, and a financial plan. Many of Brandt's recommendations were incorporated into the publishing procedures still followed by UNMP.

In 1945, Professor Dudley Wynn of the English department was made Director of UNMP. The printing plant continued as part of the press but was made a separate division with Fred Harvey in charge. UNMP continued to print New Mexico Quarterly and also the Southwest Journal of Anthropology, New Mexico Historical Review, and New Mexico Business Review. Throughout the life of the press, occasional subsidies or grant money helped offset publishing costs. In 1945, one of the first major grants was accepted when the Carnegie Corporation offered $1,500 for publication of It Happened in Taos, an educational study by J. T. Reid. By 1945, the press had issued sixty-five books, employed a staff of twenty, and operated without a university subsidy. During the period of 1944–1946, the press disassociated from joint publishing agreements with the School of American Research and Rydal Press, both in Santa Fe.

The Press Committee drew up what appears to be the first comprehensive outline for press operations in 1946. Budget appropriations, approval of manuscripts, qualifications of press personnel, operating procedures, and an editorial program were all covered. The Committee and Press activities would be overseen by two executives: the Editor of Publications and the Press Manager. The Editor of Publications would build the list of the press through acquisitions and the press Manager would be responsible for the printing, marketing, and sales aspects.

The editorial program at this time recognized that the press would publish two kinds of materials: scholarly works that would be included in the Publications Series and other books. The Publications Series would be fully subsidized by the university, and others would be partially subsidized or published at the press's own financial risk. Toward the end of the 1947–48 fiscal year, then-president of the university, Tom Popejoy, drew up business guidelines for UNMP. A deficit subsidy of $15,000 annually would be the university's maximum support and the press was told to strive for increased sales and self-sufficiency.

In mid-1949, Fred Harvey took a leave of absence and E. B. Mann replaced him. During this era, Mann published such writers as Ross Calvin and Frank Waters as the press was giving serious attention to developing a regional list that would appeal to a wide audience. Mann, himself an author of Western fiction, proposed a series of reprints of Southwestern fiction, but the idea was tabled in 1950. The Press also made its first foray into publishing lithographed prints during Mann's tenure but, due to the marketing structure of the press, sales for the prints were poor.

== Reorganization ==
As a move toward greater economy and efficiency, UNM president Tom Popejoy decided to combine three departments—UNM Press, the New Mexico Quarterly, and the Publications Series into one department. Printing operations moved to independent status as the University Printing Plant. As a result of this restructuring, all press staff lost their jobs on September 15, 1956. The Regents then appointed Roland Dickey director, and in December 1956, four full-time and two part-time employees oversaw press operations. In 1965, after a visit to UNMP by Frank H. Wardlaw—then Director of the University of Texas Press—Director Dickey visited the University of Oklahoma Press to study their methods under Director Savoie Lottinville.

On December 31, 1966, another reorganization of the press took place. Dickey accepted a position with the University of Wisconsin Press, and on July 1, 1967, Roger Shugg, recently retired as head of the University of Chicago Press, became director. By the end of his first year, the press had published sixteen new titles, compared to a total of nineteen over the previous three years. Sales income increased fifty-eight percent and the deficit was well below predictions. In 1969, UNMP published The Way to Rainy Mountain, N. Scott Momaday's blockbuster that has become a modern-day classic of Kiowa Indian myth, history, and personal reminiscences. The New Yorker called the book "fascinating" and "beautifully illustrated." The book is still among UNMP's all-time best-selling titles.

Around this same time, Jack D. Rittenhouse joined the press. Rittenhouse left his position as director of the Museum of New Mexico Press. The popular Zia paperback reprint series was Editor Rittenhouse's brainchild and included more than thirty-five titles, including works from Edward Abbey, Larry McMurtry, and Frank Dobie.

Roger Shugg retired in 1973, and Hugh Treadwell became director. When Treadwell resigned in early 1980, Shugg was once again brought out of retirement to act as interim director until the hiring late in the summer of 1980 of Luther Wilson, who came from the University of Oklahoma Press.

== Modern times ==
After several years of overseeing growth of the press's title output and revenue, Wilson left the press in 1985 to become director at Syracuse University Press. Beth Hadas, editor-in-chief at UNMP, became director upon Wilson's departure. Hadas was one of only six women at the helm of a university press at the time. A year after Hadas became director, UNMP published The Education of Little Tree by Forrest Carter — the press's all-time best-selling title, having sold more than two million copies. Hadas and former director Wilson acquired reprint rights in 1985 from the author's agent and his widow. The book, originally positioned as a non-fiction account of the life of a Cherokee boy, with the sub-title "A True Story", was later deemed to be fiction because of the author's misrepresentation of his past, which included affiliation with the Ku Klux Klan and speech-writing for racist Alabama Governor George Wallace. Nevertheless, the story has maintained its popularity and enjoyed success on The New York Times Bestseller Lists for both fiction and nonfiction. In 1991, the book won the first annual Abby Award from the American Bookseller's Association for the book of the year.

The press has gained national and international stature since the 1970s in fields that parallel the strengths of UNM: western history, Latin American studies, anthropology and archaeology, photography and art, and Chicano/a and Native American studies. The press also initiated distribution agreements to provide small client publishers with fulfillment and marketing services.

Luther Wilson returned to the press in 2000, after a stint at the University Press of Colorado. By the middle of the decade, list size had grown from fifty to eighty new titles a year and sales had doubled to $5 million. By 2006, turbulent downtrends associated with September 11 and the March 2003 invasion of Iraq occurred. Economic conditions necessitated a new wave of reorganization and downsizing in 2008–2009. Upon Luther Wilson's retirement in the summer of 2010, John W. Byram became director of the press.

== See also ==
- List of English-language book publishing companies
- List of university presses
