= Brown Hall (Socorro, New Mexico) =

- U.S. National Register of Historic Places
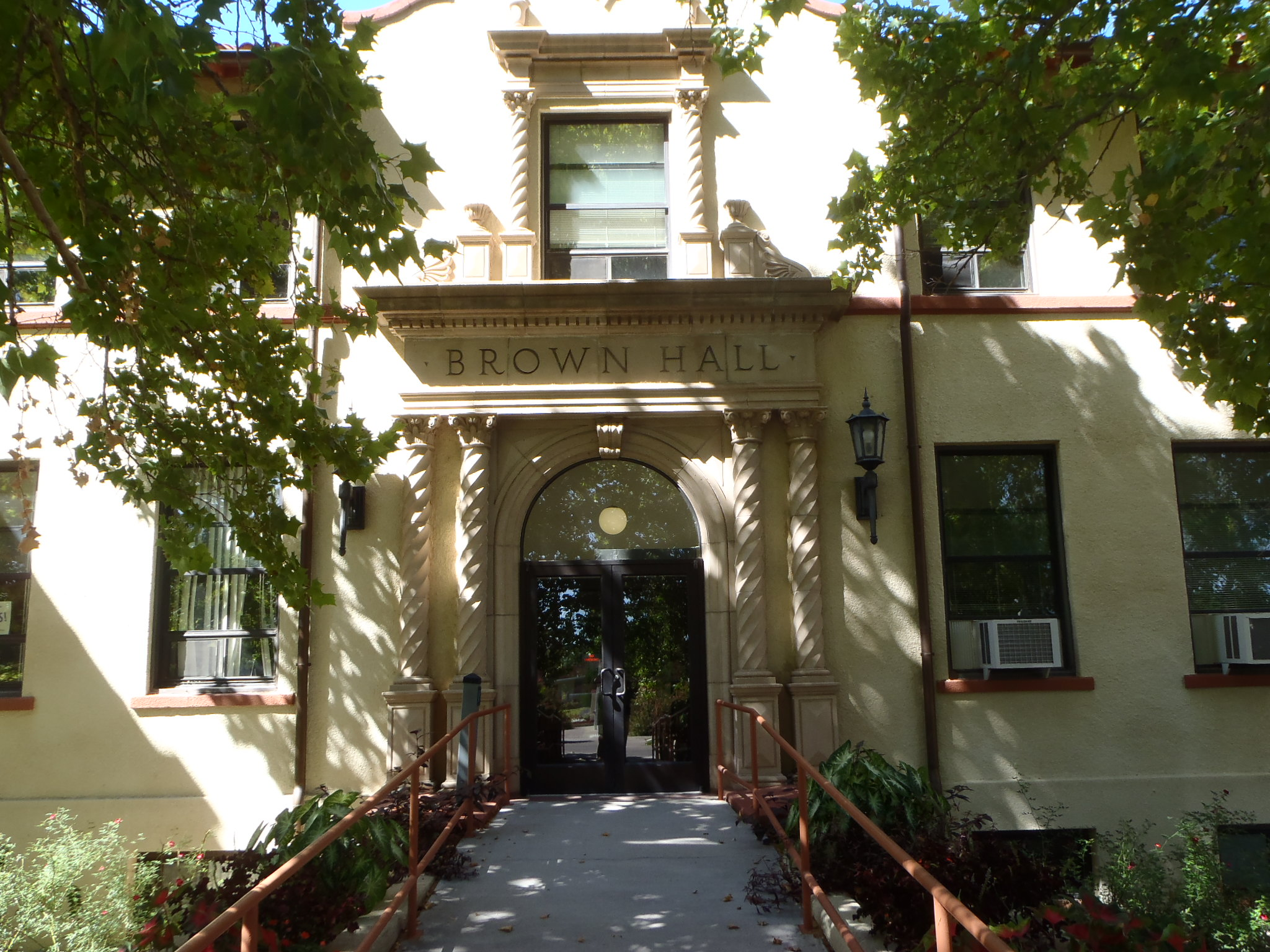

- Location within New Mexico Location within the United States
- Location: New Mexico Institute of Mining and Technology, Socorro, New Mexico
- Coordinates: 34°03′59″N 106°54′17″W
- Area: 0.5 acres (0.20 ha)
- Built: 1929; 97 years ago
- Architect: George Williamson
- Architectural style: Mission/Spanish Revival, Spanish Colonial Baroque
- MPS: New Mexico Campus Buildings Built 1906--1937 TR
- NRHP reference No.: 88001550
- Added to NRHP: May 16, 1989

The Brown Hall in Socorro, New Mexico is a New Mexico Institute of Mining and Technology campus building built in 1929. It was designed by George Williamson in Mission Revival style, with Spanish Colonial Baroque elements.

It is an I-shaped masonry and stucco building.

It was listed on the National Register of Historic Places in 1989.
