= Anderson School of Management (University of New Mexico) =

Business school of the University of New Mexico

Coordinates: 35.086°N 106.619°W

Anderson School of Management at the University of New Mexico
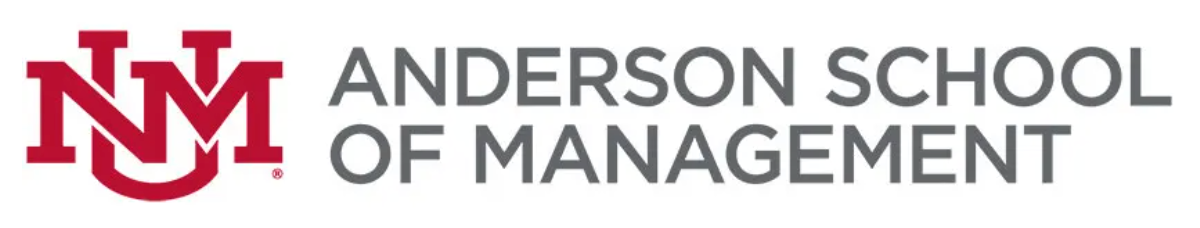
- Established: 1947
- Dean: Julie Coonrod (Interim)
- Academic staff: 103 (total); 50 (tenured and tenure-track); 53 (adjunct and non-tenure track)
- Undergraduates: 981
- Postgraduates: 474
- Location: Albuquerque, New Mexico
- Website: www.mgt.unm.edu

The Anderson School of Management (Anderson) is the business school of the University of New Mexico (UNM). Anderson was the first professional school of management established in the state of New Mexico. Anderson's current alumni base is over 24,000 graduates.

== History ==
The school was founded as the College of Business Administration in 1947 under xxx. It has been accredited by the Association to Advance Collegiate Schools of Business (AACSB) since 1975. UNM was the third university to gain professional AACSB accreditation for both their bachelor's and master's degree programs management programs. In 1974, the school was named for Robert Orville Anderson, a New Mexico oilman and longtime CEO of the Atlantic Richfield Company (ARCO). The school was the first at a state college or university in New Mexico to be named in honor of a prominent citizen.

The school has grown from 15 tenured or tenure-track faculty members when it was established to 50 tenured or tenure-track faculty members today. The current interim dean is Julie Coonrod.

== Academics ==
The Anderson School offers undergraduate Bachelor of Business Administration (BBA) degrees and four master's degree programs: The Master of Business Administration (MBA), including online, professional and executive MBA (EMBA) programs, the Master of Science in Cybersecurity and Business Analytics (MS-CBA), the Master of Science in Project Management (MS-PM), and the Master of Accounting (MACCT). BBA and MBA students may select from ten concentrations: Accounting, entrepreneurship, financial management, information assurance, international management, information systems management, management of technology, marketing management, operations management, organizational behavior/human resource management, and policy and planning. Students may also choose not to pursue a concentration.

BBA students may select from ten concentrations: Accounting, finance, human resource management, interdisciplinary film and digital media (IFDM), international management, information systems management, marketing management, operations management, entrepreneurial studies, or organizational leadership.

The Anderson School offers several dual-degree programs for students who wish to pursue a second advanced degree in conjunction with the MBA. MBA dual degree programs are offered with the Juris Doctor (JD) with the School of Law (MBA/JD), the Master of Engineering programs in manufacturing engineering and electrical or computer engineering (MBA/MEME and MBA/ME) with the School of Engineering; the MBA/Pharm.D. (MBA/Doctor of Pharmacy); and the Master of Arts in Latin American Studies (MBA/MA) with the UNM Latin American Studies Program. The School also offers a dual-degree program with the School of Law with the Master of Accounting (JD/MACCT).

Anderson's MBA program in Management of Technology was ranked in the top 10 in the U.S. in a 2004 study published in the Journal of Product Innovation Management.

The Anderson School offers several scholarships to its students. In the 2012–2013 academic year, 131 undergraduate students applied for scholarships; 53 students received awards totaling $51,500. 155 MBA/MACCT students applied for scholarships; 97 students received awards totaling $191,030.

In April 2008, the Federal Bureau of Investigation announced that was awarding the nation's 15th Regional Computer Forensics Laboratory (RCFL) to New Mexico, with the University of New Mexico as one of several partnering institutions and agencies. The New Mexico RCFL is a computer forensics laboratory and training center supporting local, state, and federal criminal investigations. The Anderson School's Center for Information Assurance Research and Education, established in 2006, is involved with the laboratory. The CIARE was designated a Center of Academic Excellence in Information Assurance by the National Security Agency and Department of Homeland Security in spring 2007.

The Anderson School is part of the UNM Interdisciplinary Film and Digital Media Program, along with the College of Fine Arts and other UNM programs.

The Anderson School's Endowed Chair in Economic Development, currently held by Dr. Suleiman Kassicieh, oversees a wide range of economic development initiatives within the school, including the UNM Business Plan Competition, with over $100,000 in annual prizes and additional venture capital funding for student teams who compose the strongest technology and entrepreneurial business plans.

The UNM Small Business Institute (SBI) at Anderson, established in 1978, connects with Albuquerque-area businesses with graduate and undergraduate students who provide free consulting work under the guidance of the faculty. The institute works with around 25 businesses a semester.

Anderson MBA marketing have won the Cadillac National Case Study Competition in 2005 and 2006, and placed second in 2007.

Senior-level BBA marketing students won Project Acceleration: The Subaru Impreza Collegiate Challenge in 2007.

=== Rankings ===
In April 2009, the Bridgespan Group ranked the Anderson School tied for third in the nation in the number of courses specifically related to managing social sector organizations. In 2007, the Aspen Institute Center for Business Education rated the Anderson School 18th in the world among business schools for demonstrating significant leadership in integrating social and environmental issues into its MBA program. In the same year, Hispanic Business magazine included Anderson School one its list of "top ten U.S. business schools for Hispanics" based on its total graduate and Hispanic enrollment, faculty, student services, retention rate and reputation. In March 2011 Anderson was, according to US News, one of the top 10 business schools with the highest three month job placement rates among full-time 2010 M.B.A. graduates. US News

== Enrollment ==
According to data reported in 2011 by U.S. News & World Report, 50.7 percent of Anderson MBA students are minorities, the 17th highest proportion of minority MBA student enrollment in the United States. Other data reported on 2011 indicates that 53.6 percent of Anderson MBA students are women.

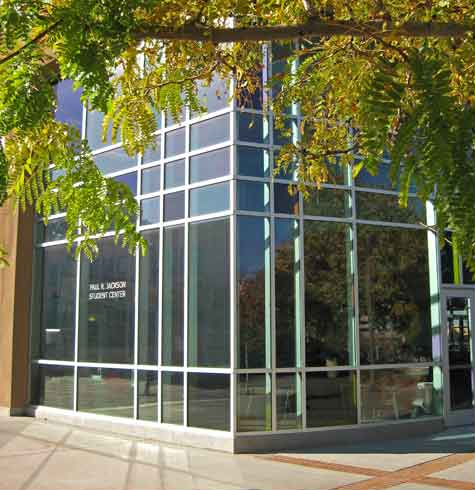
Paul R. Jackson Student Center at Anderson

== Student life ==
=== Organizations ===
Several student organizations are active at Anderson, including the Alpha Kappa Psi business fraternity (Beta Tau chapter), the American Indian Business Association (AIBA), DECA, the Association of Graduate Business Students (AGBS), the Association of Latino Professionals in Finance and Accounting (ALPFA), the Beta Alpha Psi business honor society, Delta Sigma Pi (Gamma Iota chapter), the Finance Management Association (FMA), the Graduate and Professional Association (GPSA), the Hispanic Business Student Association (HBSA), the Institute of Management Accountants (IMA), Net Impact, the Society for Human Resource Management (SHRM), and the Student Contracts Management Association.

=== Events ===
Anderson's "Distinguished CEO Lecture Series" has featured lectures from CEOs, including New Mexico native and Anderson alumnus Michael S. Gallegos Gallegos also sponsors the $25,000 first-place prize for the UNM Technology Business Plan Competition, an Anderson initiative which seeks to foster high-tech startup firms and high-wage job creation in the state.

Anderson hosted the first Albuquerque Hispano Chamber of Commerce Day in the spring 2008, where prominent Hispanic business leaders spoke.

== Alumni ==
Anderson alumni include James G. Ellis (BBA, 1968), dean of the University of Southern California's Marshall School of Business, and Gene E. Franchini (BBA, 1957), lawyer, judge, New Mexico Supreme Court Chief Justice.
