= President's House (University of New Mexico) =

Historic house in New Mexico, United States

- U.S. National Register of Historic Places
- NM State Register of Cultural Properties
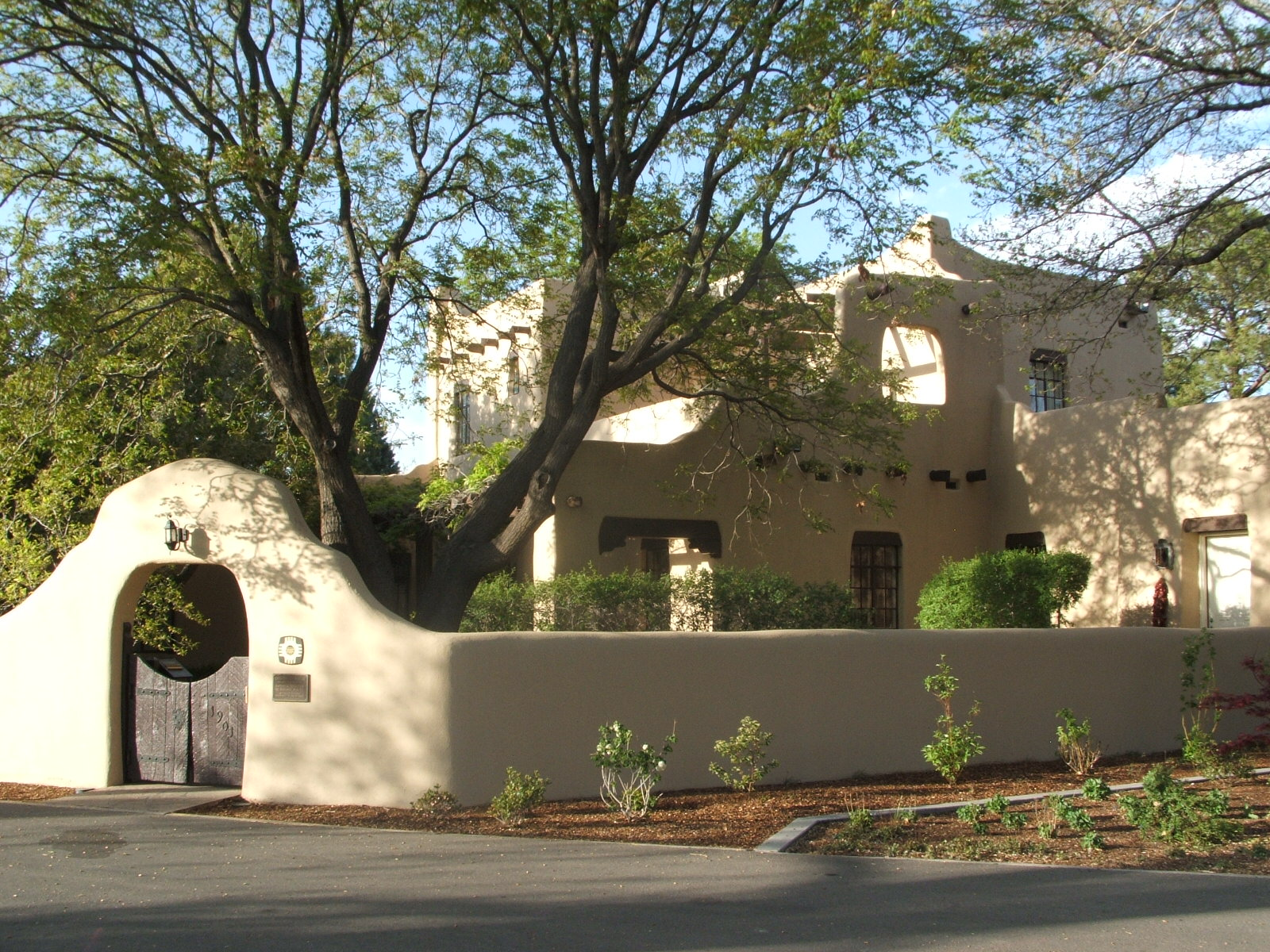

- Location within New Mexico
- Location: NE corner of Roma Ave. and Yale Blvd., UNM, Albuquerque, New Mexico
- Coordinates: 35°05′11″N 106°37′15″W
- Area: 2.1 acres (0.85 ha)
- Built: 1930, 1952
- Architect: Miles Brittelle, John Gaw Meem
- Architectural style: Mission/spanish Revival, Pueblo, Spanish Pueblo Revival
- MPS: New Mexico Campus Buildings Built 1906--1937 TR
- NRHP reference No.: 88001543
- NMSRCP No.: 1454

Significant dates
- Added to NRHP: September 22, 1988
- Designated NMSRCP: July 8, 1988

President's House, in Albuquerque, New Mexico on the University of New Mexico campus at the northeast corner of Roma Ave. and Yale Blvd., was built in 1930. It is now known as University House. It was designed by architect Miles Brittelle in Spanish Pueblo Revival style. It was listed on the New Mexico State Register of Cultural Properties and the National Register of Historic Places in 1988.

== History ==
The President's house is an adobe residence in the Spanish Pueblo Revival style. It has vertical metal casement windows with Watson wood lintels and exposed vigas in the second-story. It has a rustic second-story balcony formed by vigas and supported by a log beam and posts. This building has had several additions since its original construction in 1930. All additions were in the Pueblo style and uphold the integrity of the original building. The building was designed by Miles Brittelle and built in 1930. John Gaw Meem designed an addition to the house in 1952. The building has a shape that resembles multiple squares and rectangles.

The President's House is one of six buildings on the campus of the University of New Mexico included in this nomination. The President's House is significant because it is an excellent example of residential Spanish Pueblo Revival style architecture. The architectural quality was considered so good that the building was used as a representative example of Spanish Pueblo Revival Style architecture in a major survey of American building styles. John Gaw Meem designed an addition to the house in 1952. Although there has been various additions and renovations to the building, all additions have been true to the style and architectural integrity of the original building.
