= George M. Williamson (architect) =

American architect

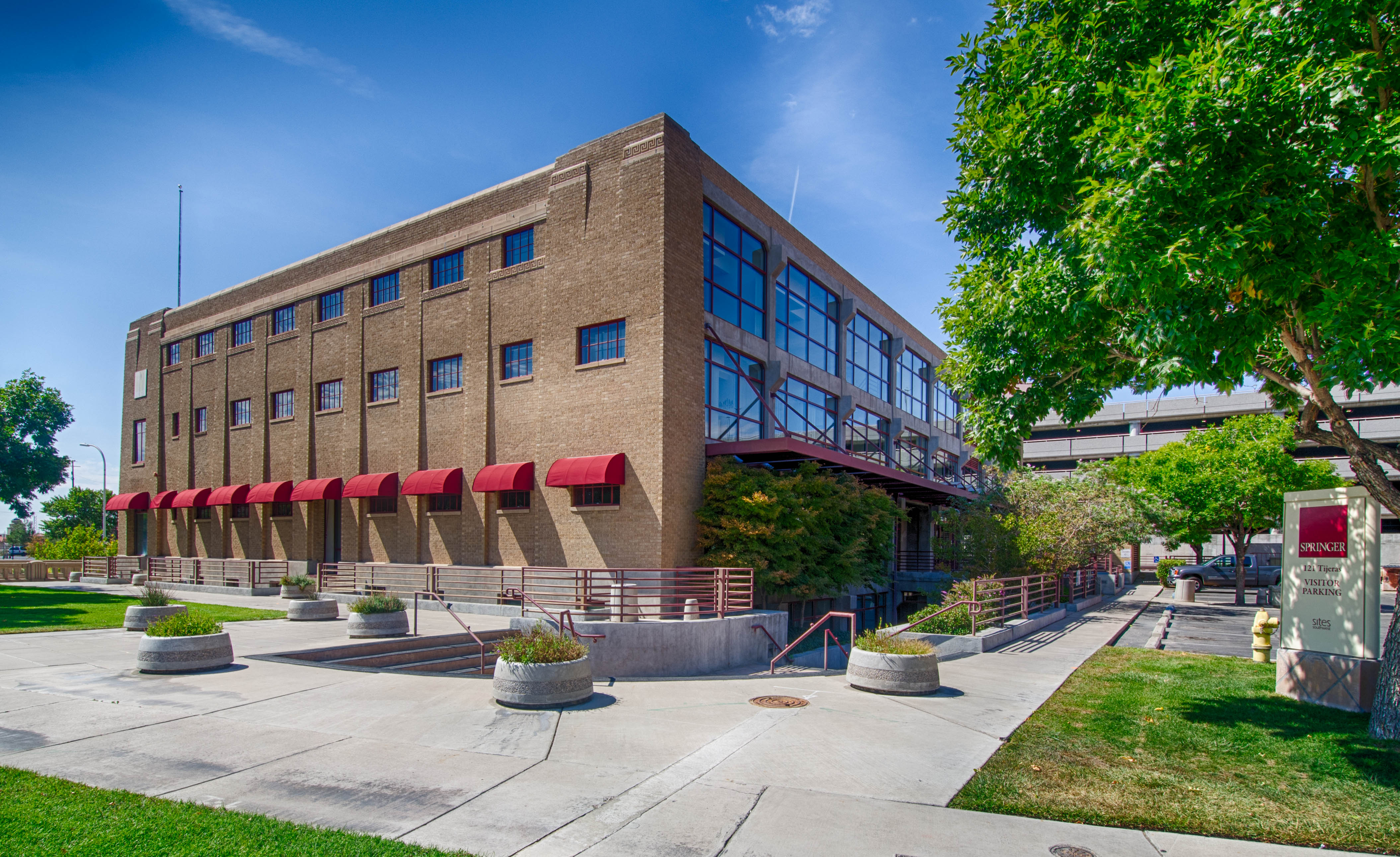
Springer Building

George Morrison Williamson (May 9, 1892 – May 19, 1979) was an American architect.

Williamson was born May 9, 1892, in Port Jefferson, New York. He studied at Cornell University with a degree in Mechanical and Electrical Engineering and worked as the Albuquerque representative for the Texas-based architectural firm Trost & Trost before starting his own firm in 1925. He died in 1979 and is interred at Arlington National Cemetery. Physicist Stirling Colgate was his son in law.

A number of his works are listed on the National Register of Historic Places.

Works include (with variations in attribution):

- Brown Hall, New Mexico Institute of Mining and Technology, Socorro, New Mexico (Williamson, George), NRHP-listed
- Connor Hall, 1060 Cerrillos Rd., NMSD, Santa Fe, New Mexico (Williamson, George), NRHP-listed
- El Raton Theater, 115 N. Second St., Raton, New Mexico (Williamson, George M.), NRHP-listed
- Grant County Courthouse, 201 N. Cooper St., Silver City, New Mexico (with W. Miles Brittelle), contributing property to NRHP's Silver City Historic District
- Kimo Theater, 423 Central Ave. NW, Albuquerque, New Mexico (with Carl Boller)
- Manual Arts Building, Albuquerque High School, Albuquerque, New Mexico
- Saint Joseph 1930 Hospital, 715 Grand, NE, Albuquerque, New Mexico (Williamson, George M.), NRHP-listed
- Springer Building, 121 Tijeras Ave., NE, Albuquerque, New Mexico (Williamson, G.M.), NRHP-listed
- Sunshine Building, 120 Central Ave SW, Albuquerque, New Mexico (Trost & Trost)

== See also ==
- George H. Williamson, also an architect, similar name
- George Williams (Idaho architect), similar name
