= Art of the American Southwest =

Visual arts of the Southwestern United States

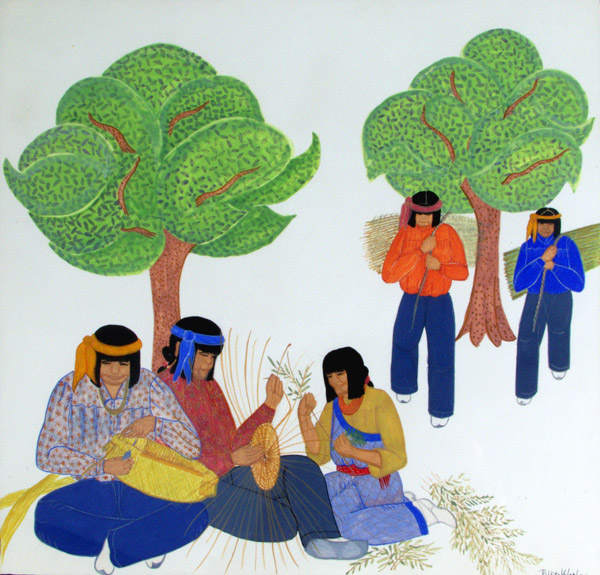
Basketmaking, c. 1940, by Pablita Velarde. Source: National Park Service

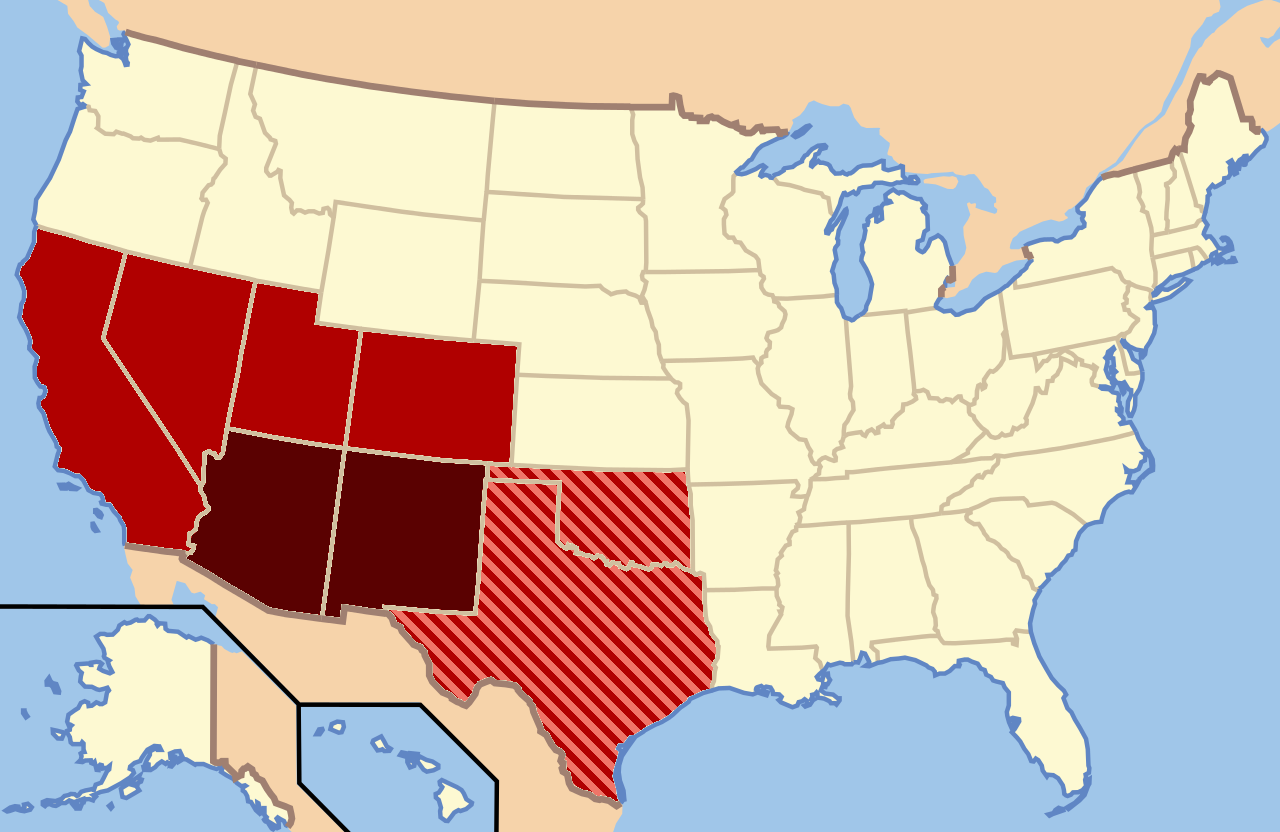
Regional definitions vary from source to source. New Mexico and Arizona (in dark red) are almost always considered the core, modern-day Southwest. The striped states may or may not be considered to be part of the same region. With the exception of Texas and Oklahoma – which are counted as part of the South – the Southwestern states are also classified as West by the U.S. Census Bureau. California is excluded from most definitions of the Southwest

Art of the American Southwest is the visual arts of the Southwestern United States. This region encompasses Arizona, New Mexico, and parts of California, Colorado, Nevada, Texas, and Utah. These arts include architecture, ceramics, drawing, filmmaking, painting, photography, sculpture, printmaking, and other media, ranging from the ancient past to the contemporary arts of the present day.

== Historic influences ==
=== Ancient Puebloan people ===
The Ancestral Puebloans, or Anasazi (up to 1400 CE) are the ancestors of today's Pueblo tribes. Their culture formed in the American Southwest after the cultivation of corn was introduced from Mesoamerica about 4,000 years ago. People of this region developed an agrarian lifestyle and lived in sedentary towns.

Common early pottery included corrugated gray ware pottery and decorated black-on-white pottery. Corrugated pottery was made from coils of clay wound into the desired shape and the clay is pinched, which created the corrugated texture. White on black evolved as a decorative pottery and was often used as a trade good for food. Sikyátki, a former Hopi village in Arizona inhabited from the 14th through the 16th centuries, is the source of polychrome pottery. Around 300 CE the Hohokam culture developed in Arizona. They are the ancestors of the Tohono O'odham and Akimel O'odham or Pima tribes. The Mimbres, a subgroup of the Mogollon culture, are especially notable for the narrative paintings on their pottery.

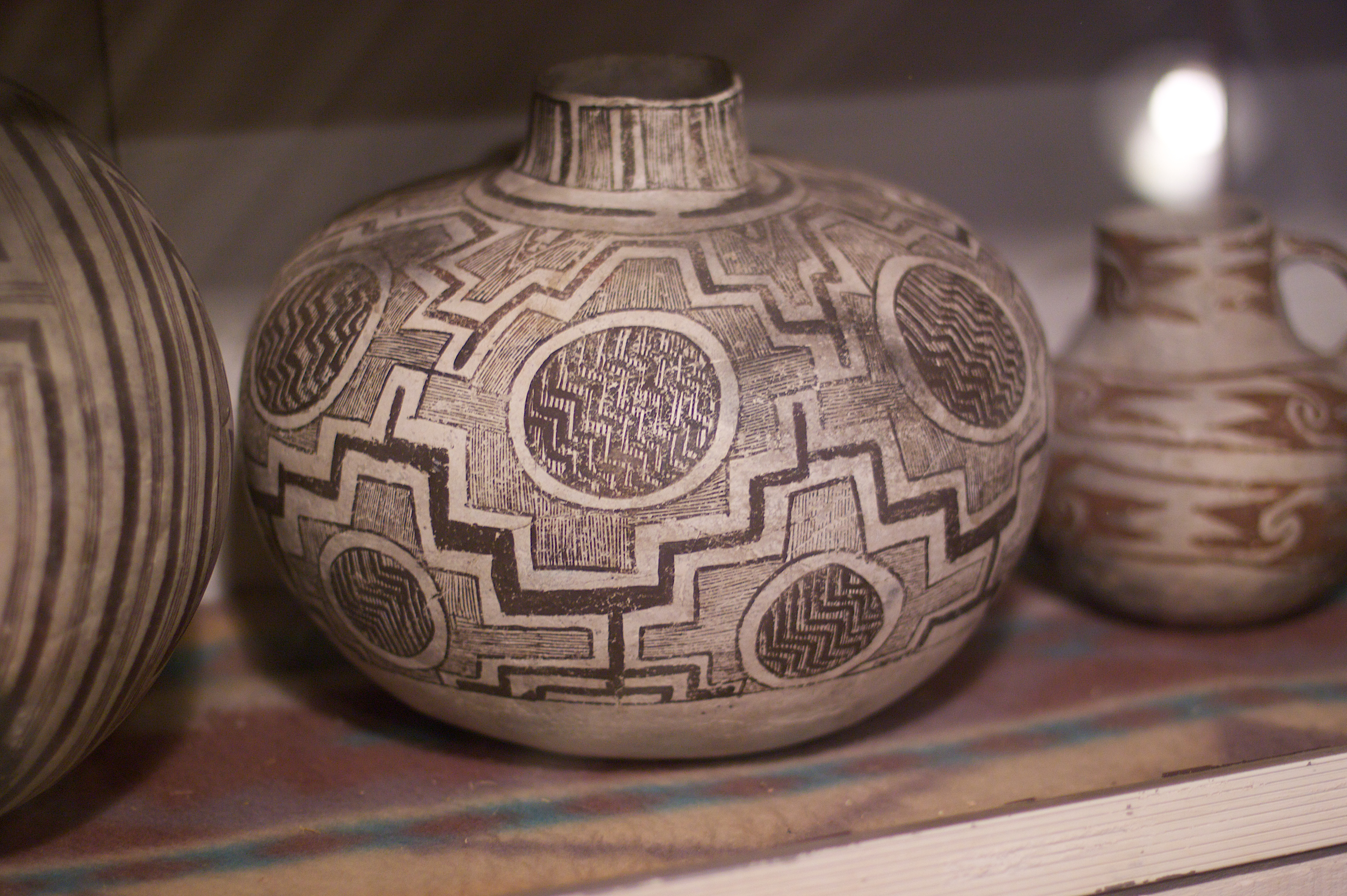
Ancestral Pueblo olla, Cibola Whiteware, northeast Arizona

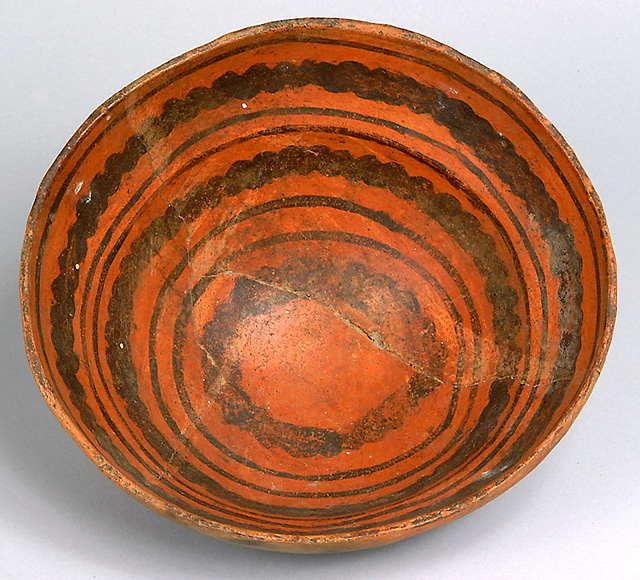
Anasazi bowl (trade ware) dating from 900-1100 AD, excavated at Chaco Culture National Historical Park

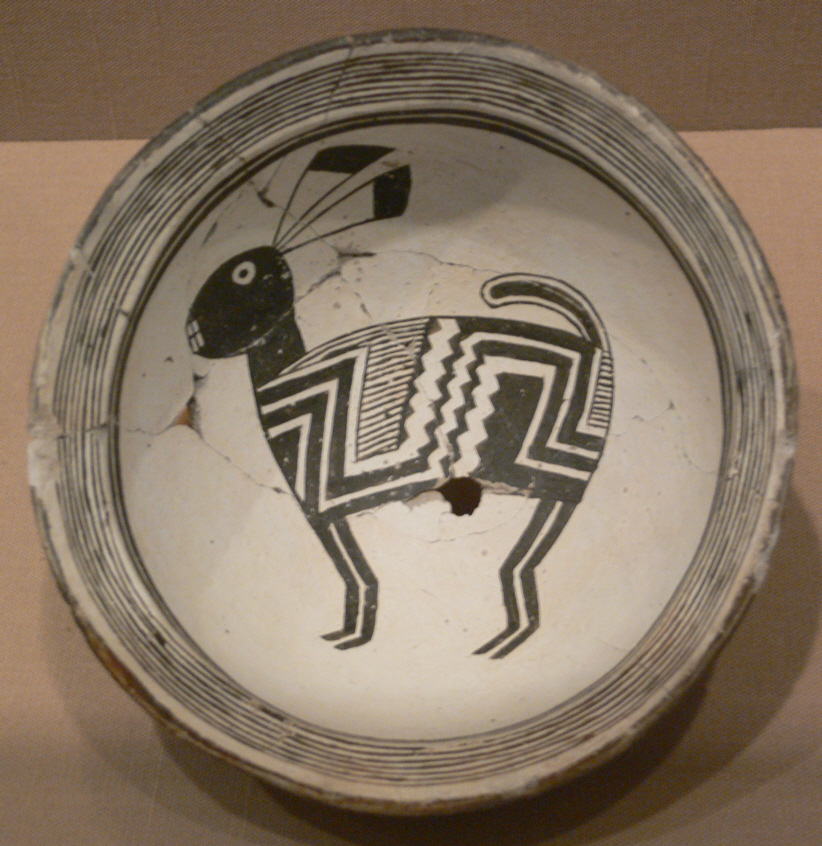
Mimbres Bowl with rabbit, AD 1000–1150

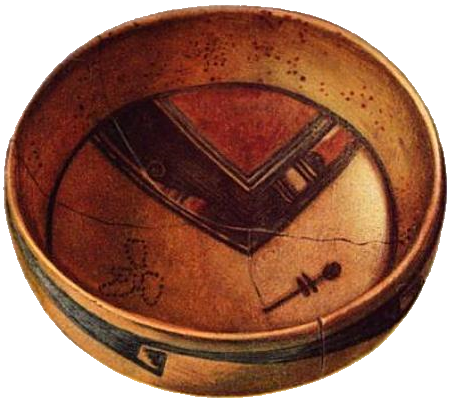
Sikyátki dragonfly bowl, about 1400-1625 AD

Turquoise, jet, and spiny oyster shell have been traditionally used by Ancestral Pueblo for jewelry, and they developed sophisticated inlay techniques centuries ago. The Ancestral Puebloans (Anasazi) of the Chaco Canyon and surrounding region are believed to have prospered greatly from their production and trading of turquoise objects.

=== Native American nations ===
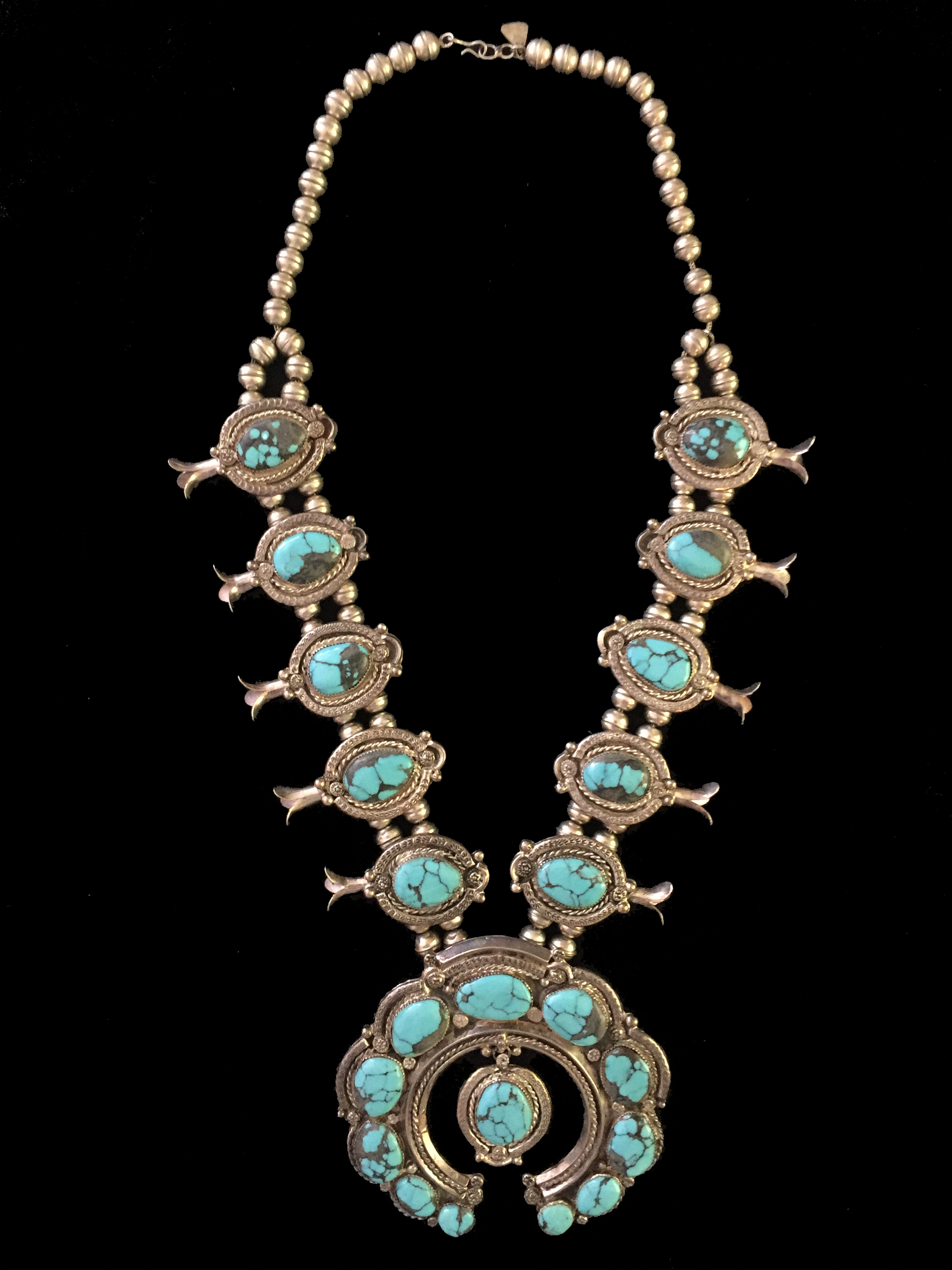
Squash Blossom Necklace by Annie Eagle

Within the last millennium, Athabaskan peoples emigrated from northern Canada in the southwest. These include the Navajo and Apache. Sandpainting is an aspect of Navajo healing ceremonies that inspired an art form. Navajos learned to weave on upright looms from Pueblos and wove blankets that were eagerly collected by Great Basin and Plains tribes in the 18th and 19th centuries. After the introduction of the railroad in the 1880s, imported blankets became plentiful and inexpensive, so Navajo weavers switched to producing rugs for trade.

Pueblo, Navajo and Apache tribes cherished turquoise for its amuletic use; the latter tribe believe the stone to afford the archer dead aim. Among these peoples turquoise was used in mosaic inlay, in sculptural works, and was fashioned into toroidal beads and freeform pendants. The distinctive silver jewelry produced by the Navajo and other Southwestern Native American tribes today is a rather modern development, thought to date from c. 1880 as a result of European influences.

=== Colonial Spanish ===
With a need to be self-sufficient, many Hispanic people woodworking, weaving, tinsmith, farming and leather work skills to create the furniture and furnishings for their homes.

=== Anglo-Americans ===
Ancient artistic traditions have been manifested in native craft for generations when Europeans began to settle in the American Southwest; an important acknowledgement for understanding the inherent aesthetic allure of this area to the Anglo-American artists.

=== Integration of influences ===
Silverworking was adopted by native Southwest artists beginning in the 1850s, when Mexican silversmiths had to trade their silverwork for cattle from the Navajo. The Zuni admired the silver jewelry made by the Navajos, such as Atsidi Sani (Old Smith), so they began trading livestock for instruction in working silver. By 1890, the Zuni had taught the Hopi how to make silver jewelry.

Native Americans were also influenced by the introduction of paintings made with oil and watercolor on canvas, where they traditionally painted objects such as hides or inside buildings, such as on the walls of a kiva. The Native American paintings provided artwork that was realistic of the Native American lifestyle in contrast to the work of Anglo-Americans romantic depictions. Traditional design elements were formalized at the Studio at the Santa Fe Indian School, defining flatstyle Native American art. The Studio was developed in 1932 by Dorothy Dunn, who taught there until 1932, and was replaced by Geronima Cruz Montoya (Ohkay Owingeh), who taught art at the Studio until its closing in 1962, when the Institute of American Indian Arts was established.

Following World War I, the completion of the Santa Fe Railroad enabled American settlers to travel across the west, as far as the California coast. New artists’ colonies started growing up around Santa Fe and Taos, the artists' primary subject matter being the native people and landscapes of the Southwest. Images of the Southwest became a popular form of advertising, used most significantly by the Santa Fe Railroad to entice settlers to come west and enjoy the “unsullied landscapes”. Walter Ufer, Bert Geer Phillips, E. Irving Couse, William Henry Jackson, Tom Lea, and Georgia O'Keeffe are some of the more prolific artists of the Southwest.

== Basketry ==
Native Americans, including those of the American Southwest, traditionally make their baskets from the materials available locally.

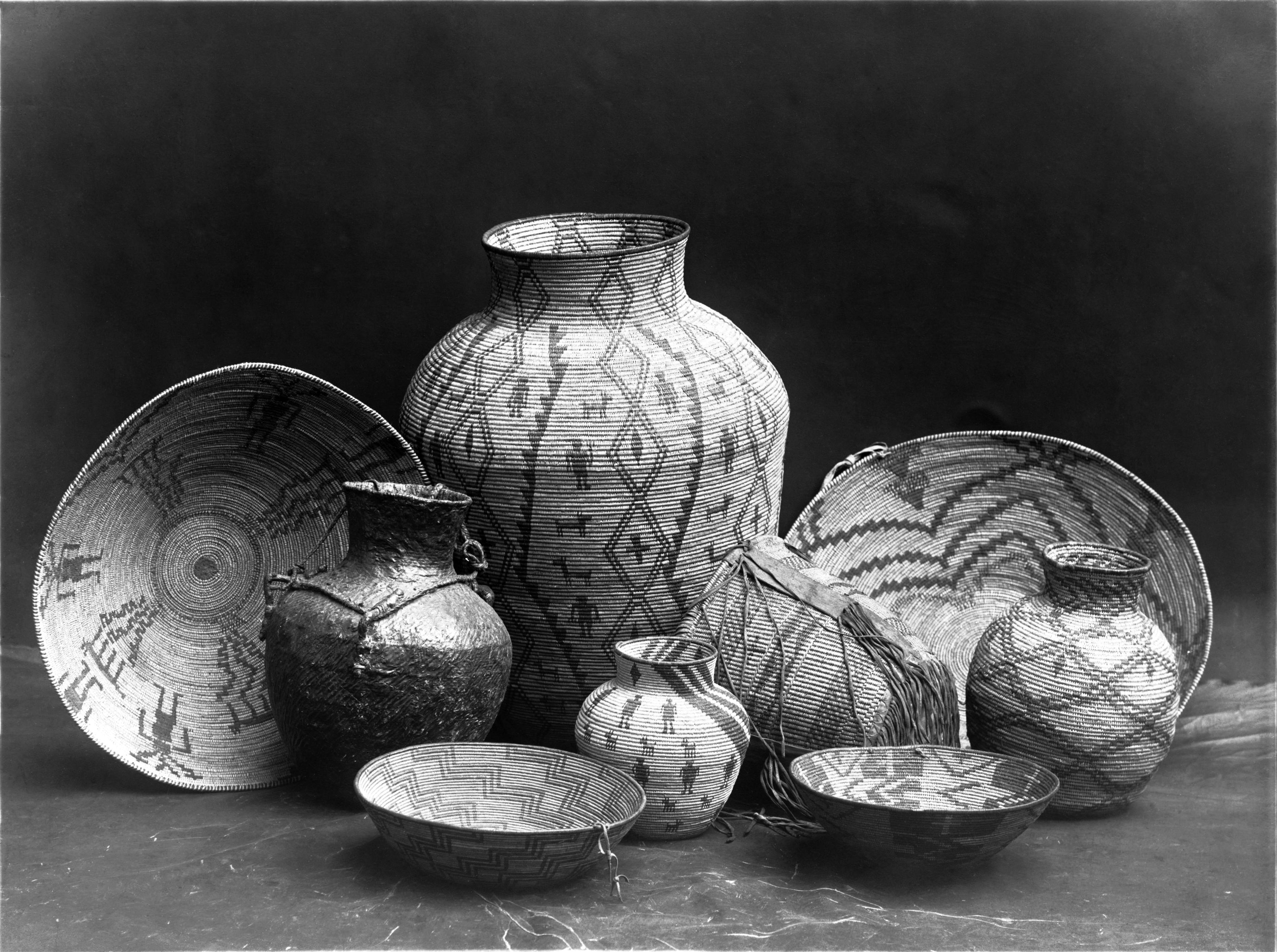
Apache basketry bowls and ollas, photo by Edward S. Curtis

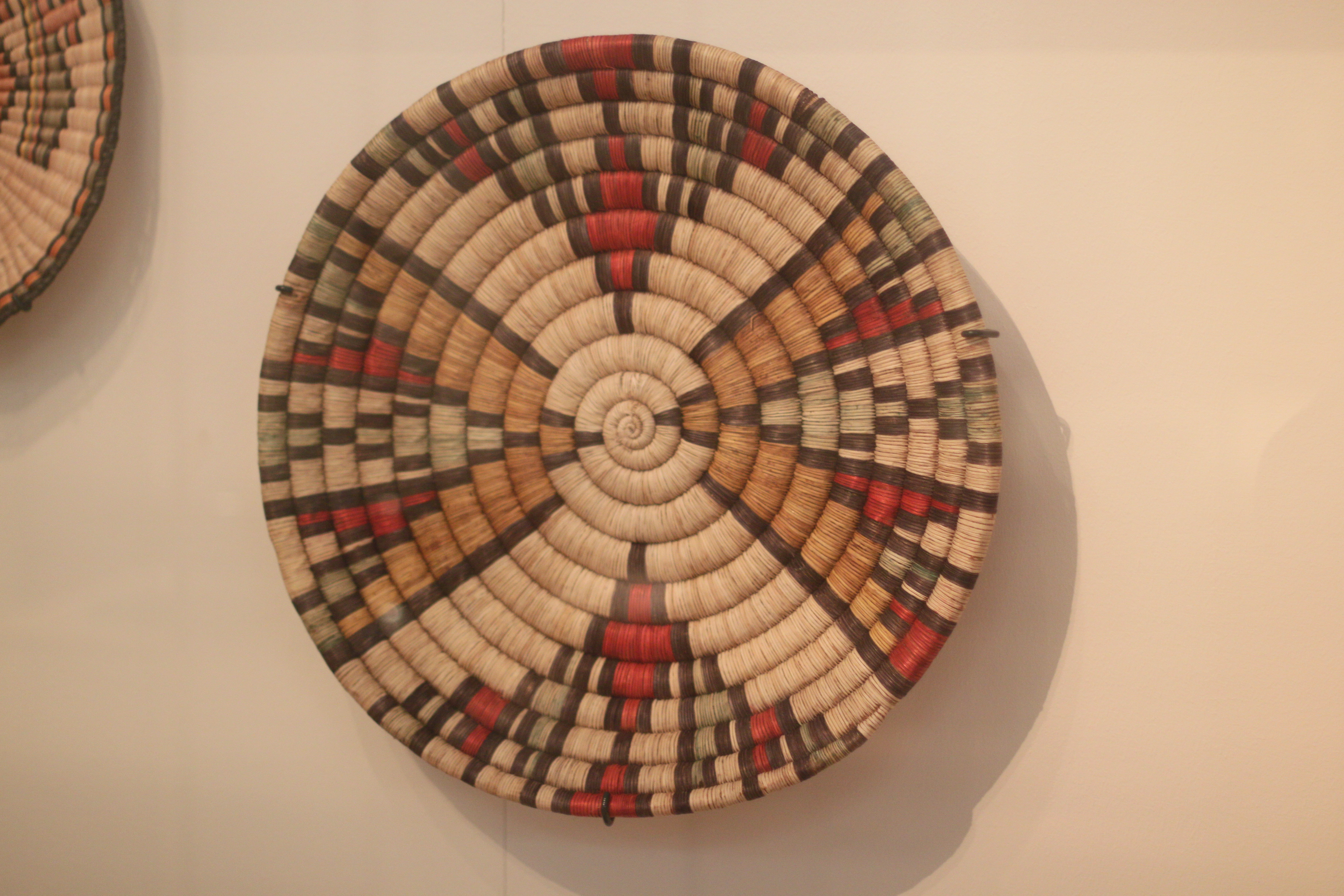
Hopi coiled basket, c. 1901, Ethnologischen Museum, Berlin-Dahlem

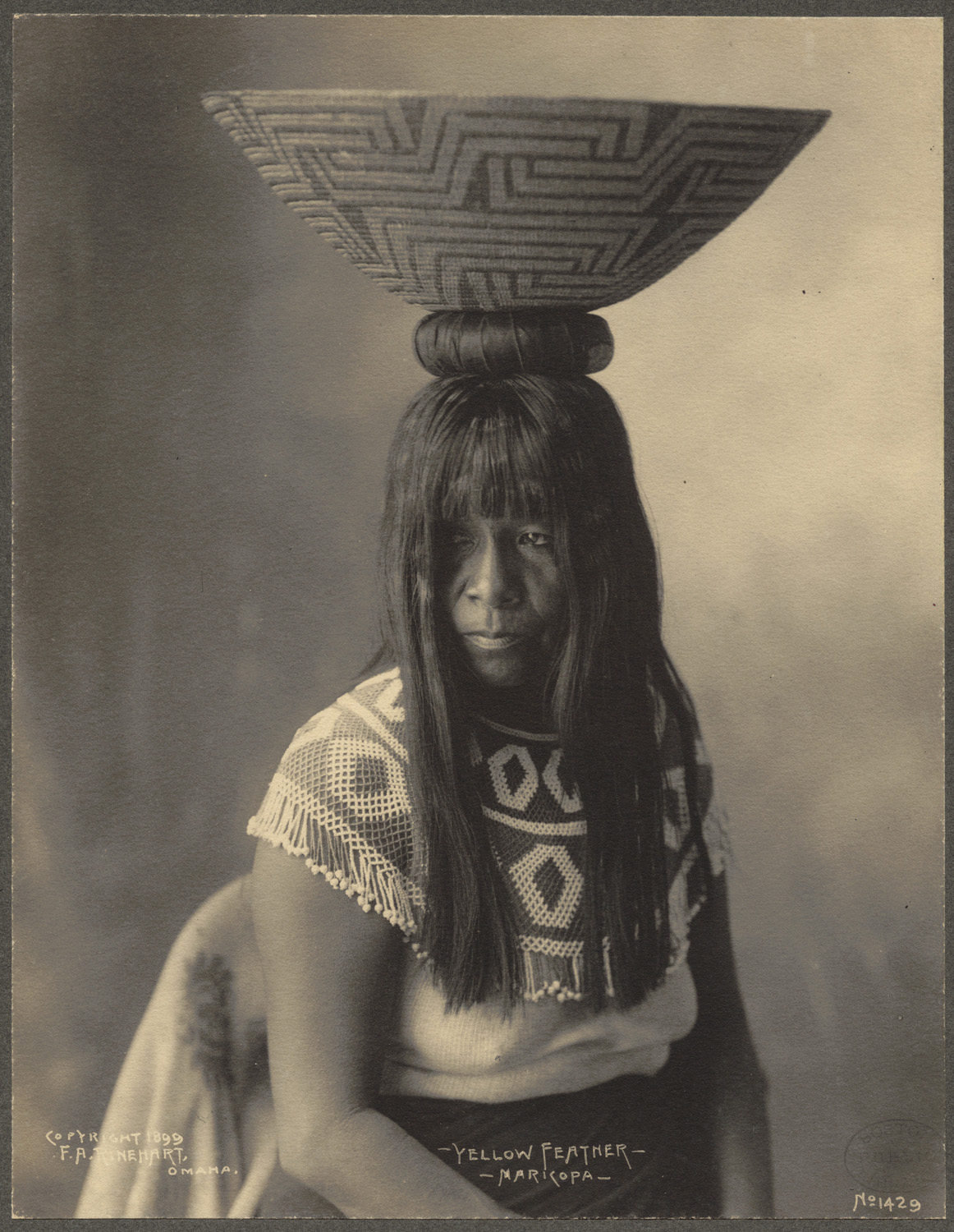
Yellow Feather (Maricopa), c. 1898, photo by Frank A. Rinehart

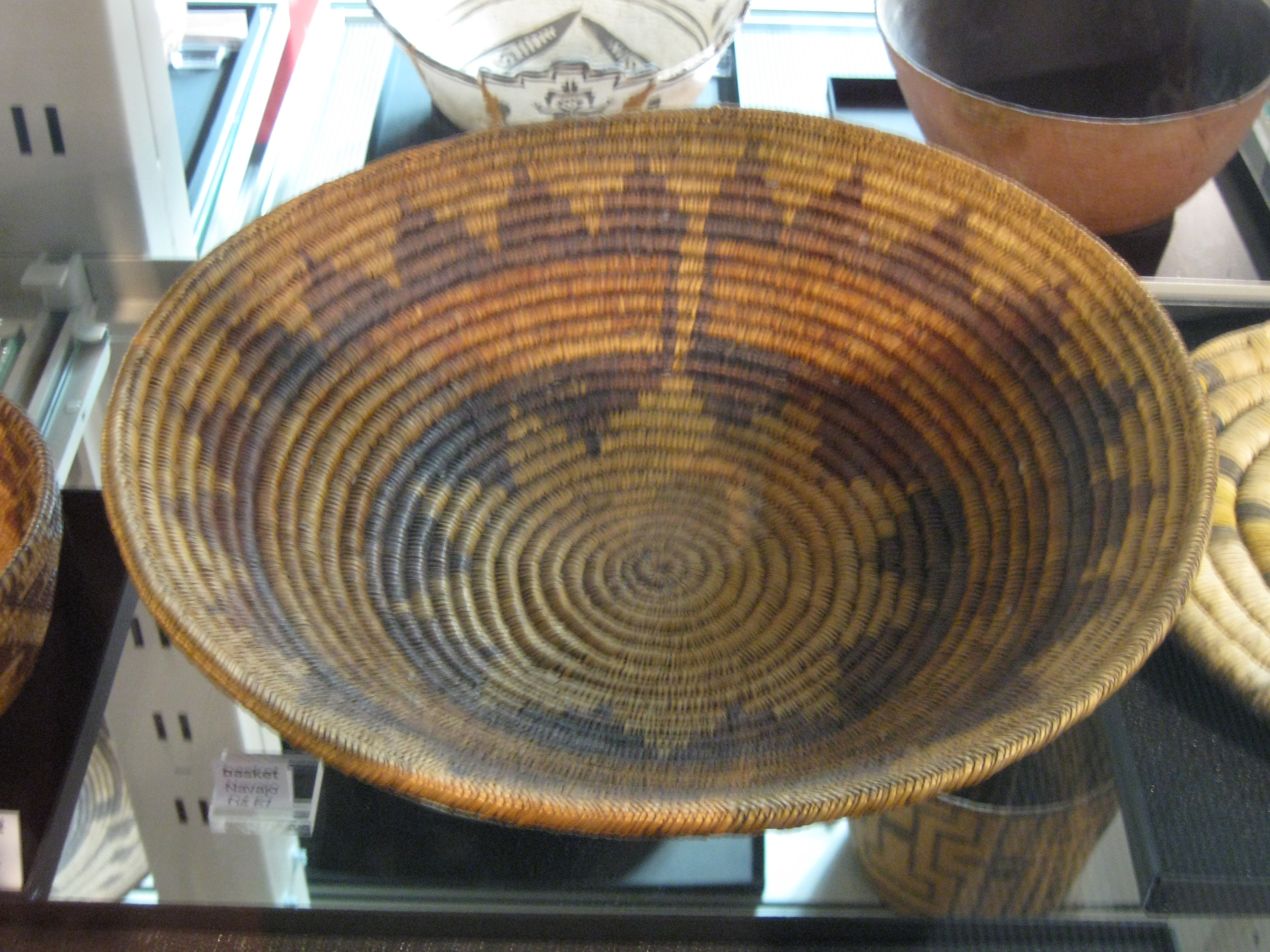
Navajo basket, Museum of Anthropology, Vancouver, BC, Canada

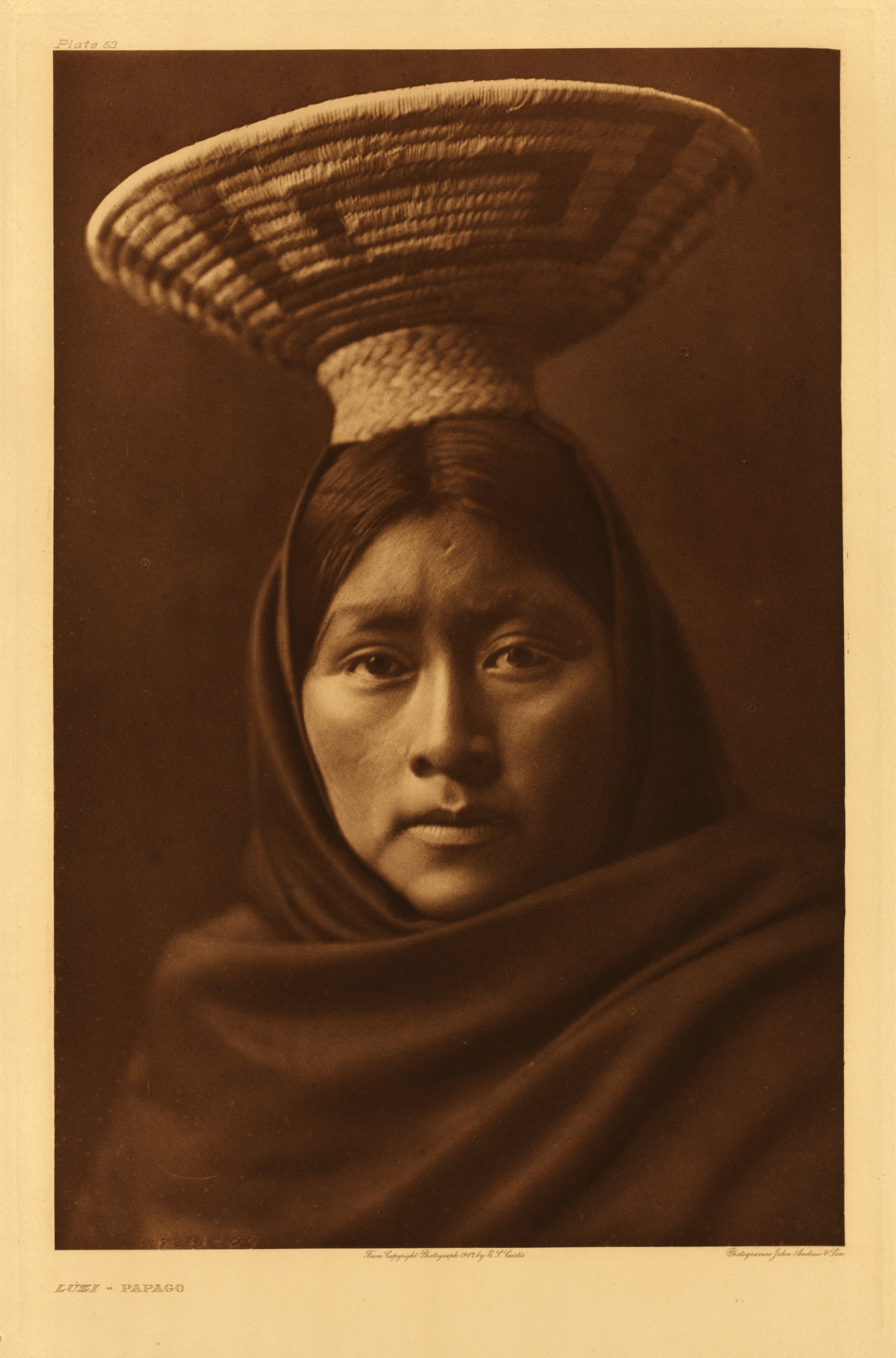
Luzi (Tohono O'odham) with coiled burden basket, with a supporting ring of yucca, photo by Edward S. Curtis

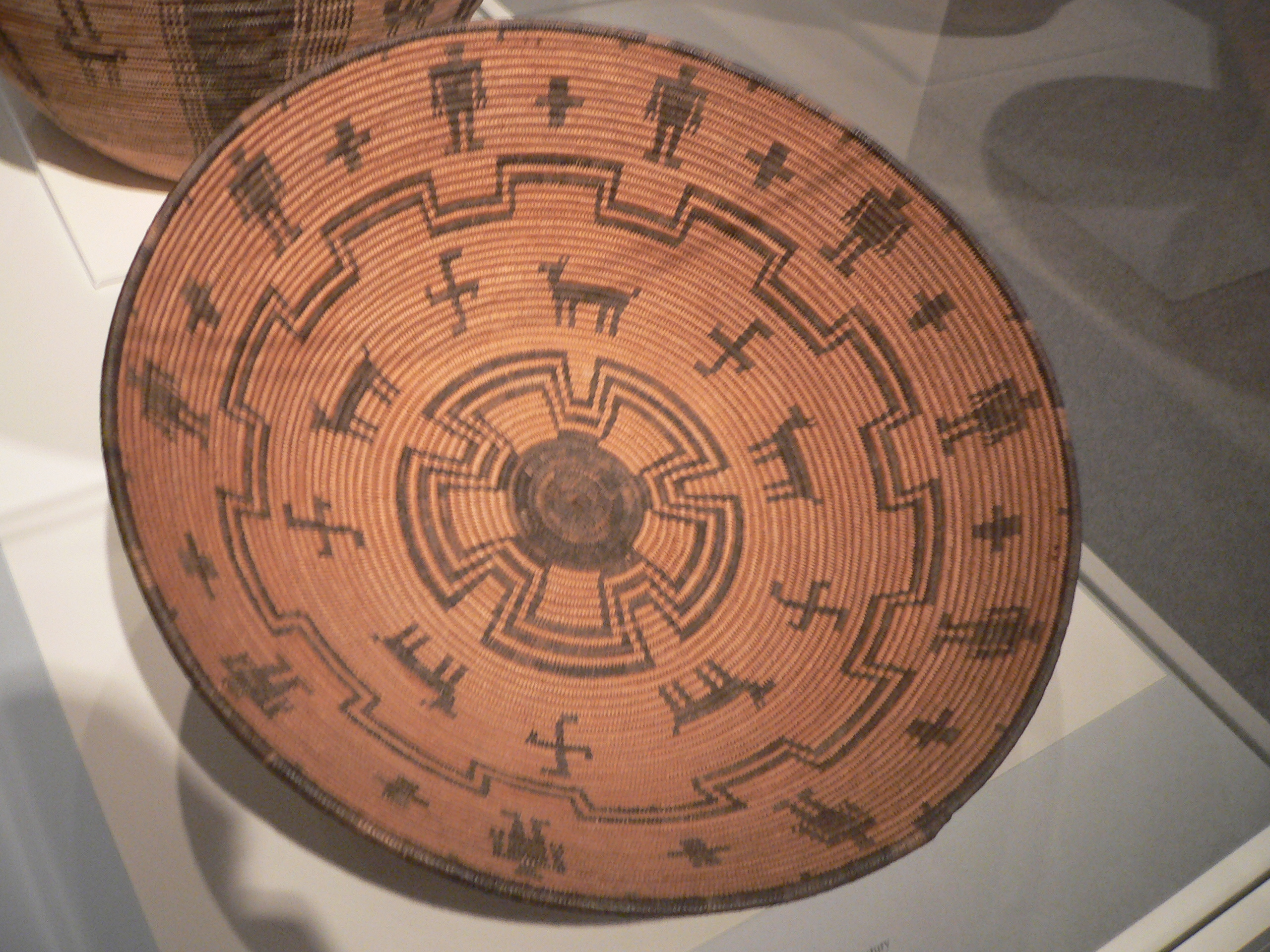
Yavapai flat, coiled willow basket, Stanford University

== Pottery ==
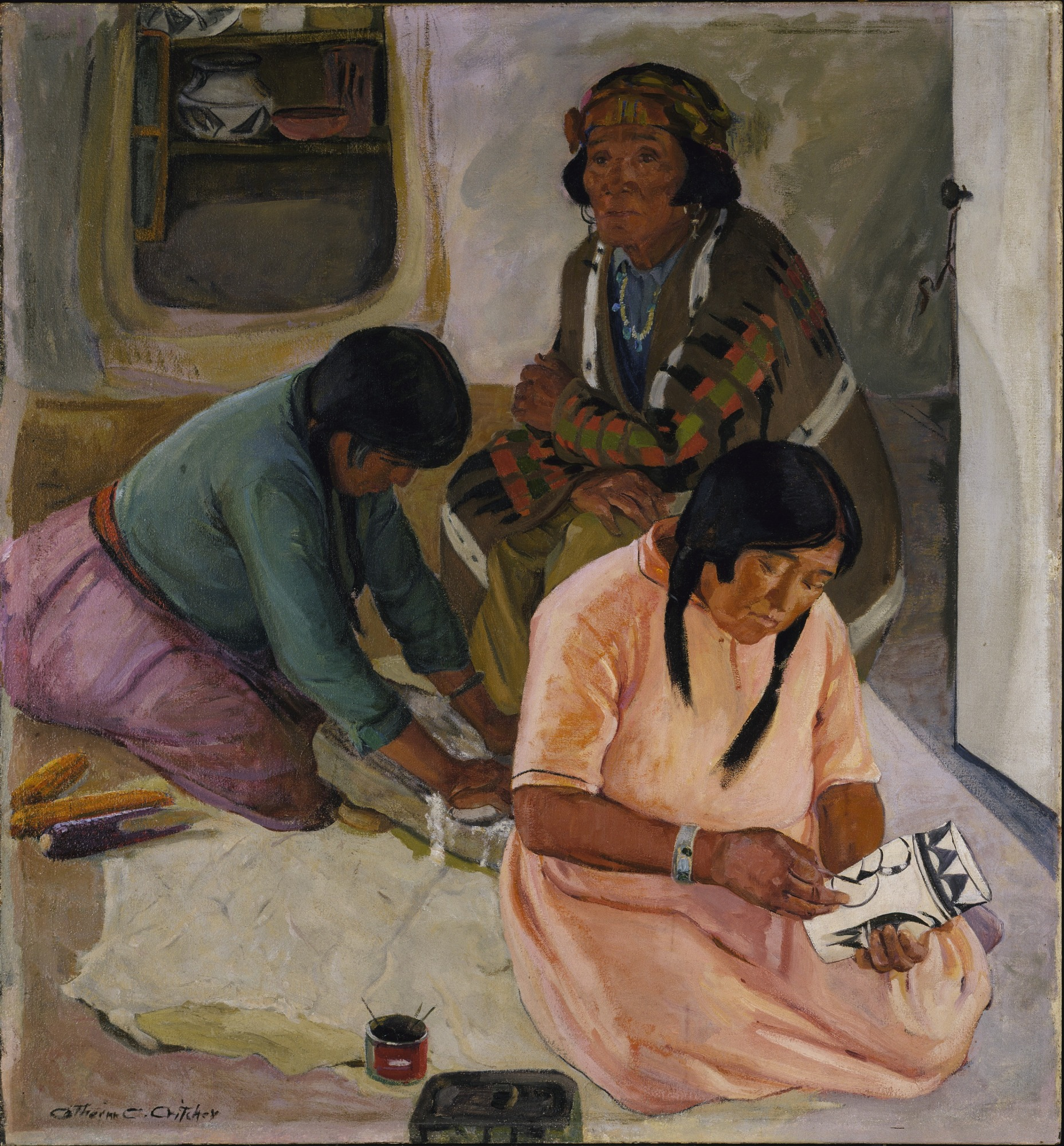
Indian Women Making Pottery by Catharine Carter Critcher, c. 1924, in the collection of the Smithsonian American Art Museum

=== Acoma pottery ===
Acoma pottery, beginning over 1,000 years ago, traditional designs include thunderbirds, geometric patterns, and rainbows. The pottery is made of fine local clay found on the pueblo to create the distinctively thin-walled pottery. The pottery is made in white and black and polychrome colors. Designs are pressed into all-white pottery with a fingernail or tool. Potters from Acoma Pueblo during the 1950s include Marie Z. Chino and Lucy M. Lewis. Vera Chino Ely, the daughter of Marie Chino, is also a well-reputed potter of Acoma pottery.

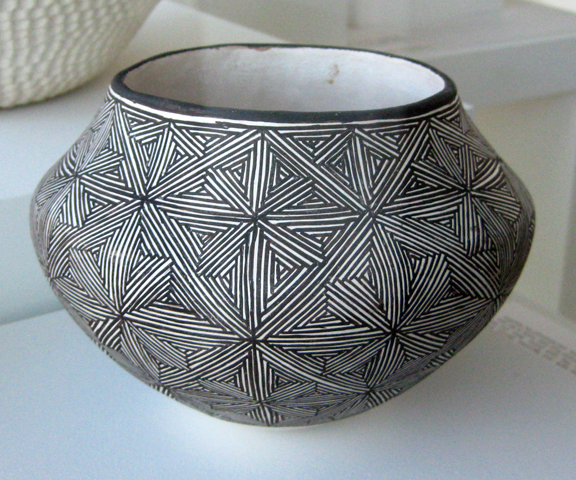
Acoma Black-on-white olla, Lucy M. Lewis, c. 1960–1970s, Fred Jones Jr. Museum of Art collection

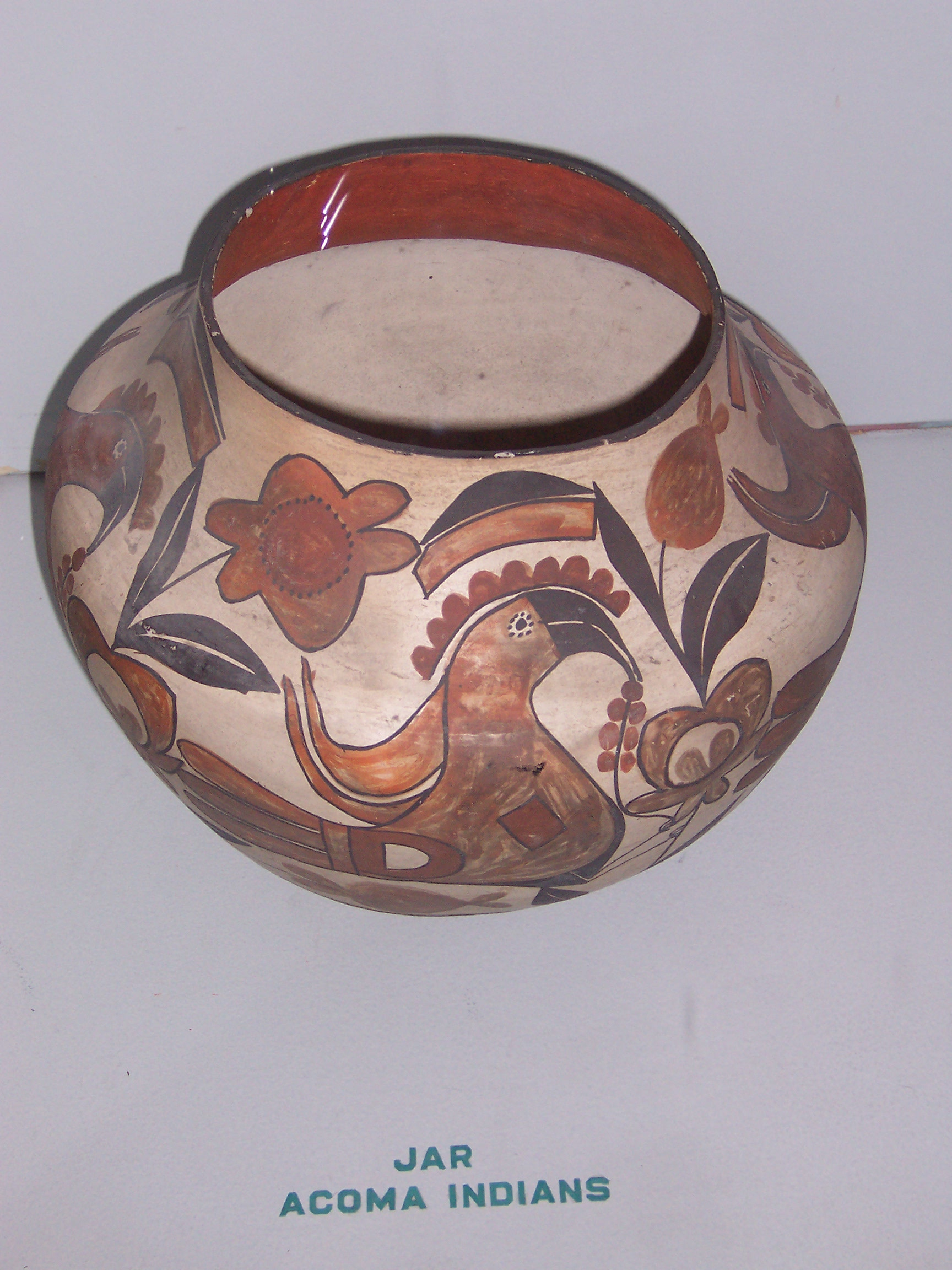
Acoma Pueblo polychrome jar, Field Museum of Natural History

=== Hopi pottery ===
In historical times, Hopi created ollas, dough bowls, and food bowls of different sizes for daily use, but they also made more elaborate ceremonial mugs, jugs, ladles, seed jars and those vessels for ritual use, and these were usually finished with polished surfaces and decorated with black painted designs. Creating pottery is a social activity for the Hopi tribe. Potters who work closely together share production skills and marketing knowledge. Children are encouraged to play with clay, but in adulthood the decision to take up pottery is a sign of "strength, maturity and patience." At the turn of the 20th century, Hopi potter Nampeyo revived Sikyatki-style polychrome pottery from the 14th to 17th centuries.

In the late 20th century, Hopi-Tewa potter Paqua Naha from First Mesa, followed by her daughter Joy Navasie, Helen Naha "Feather Woman", and their children achieved international recognition for their traditionally made Hopi pottery.

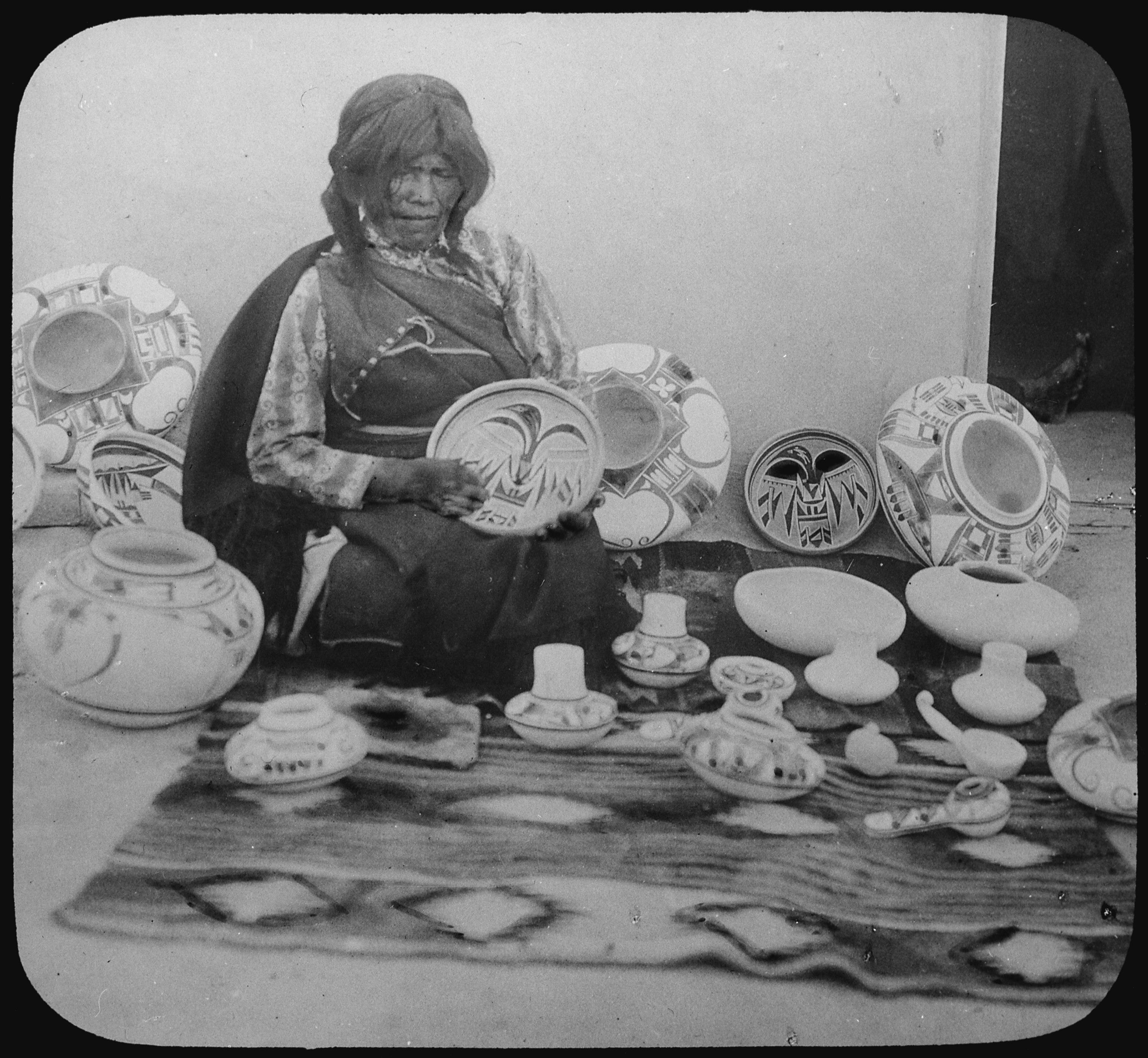
Iris Nampeyo, Hopi-Tewa potter, 1900

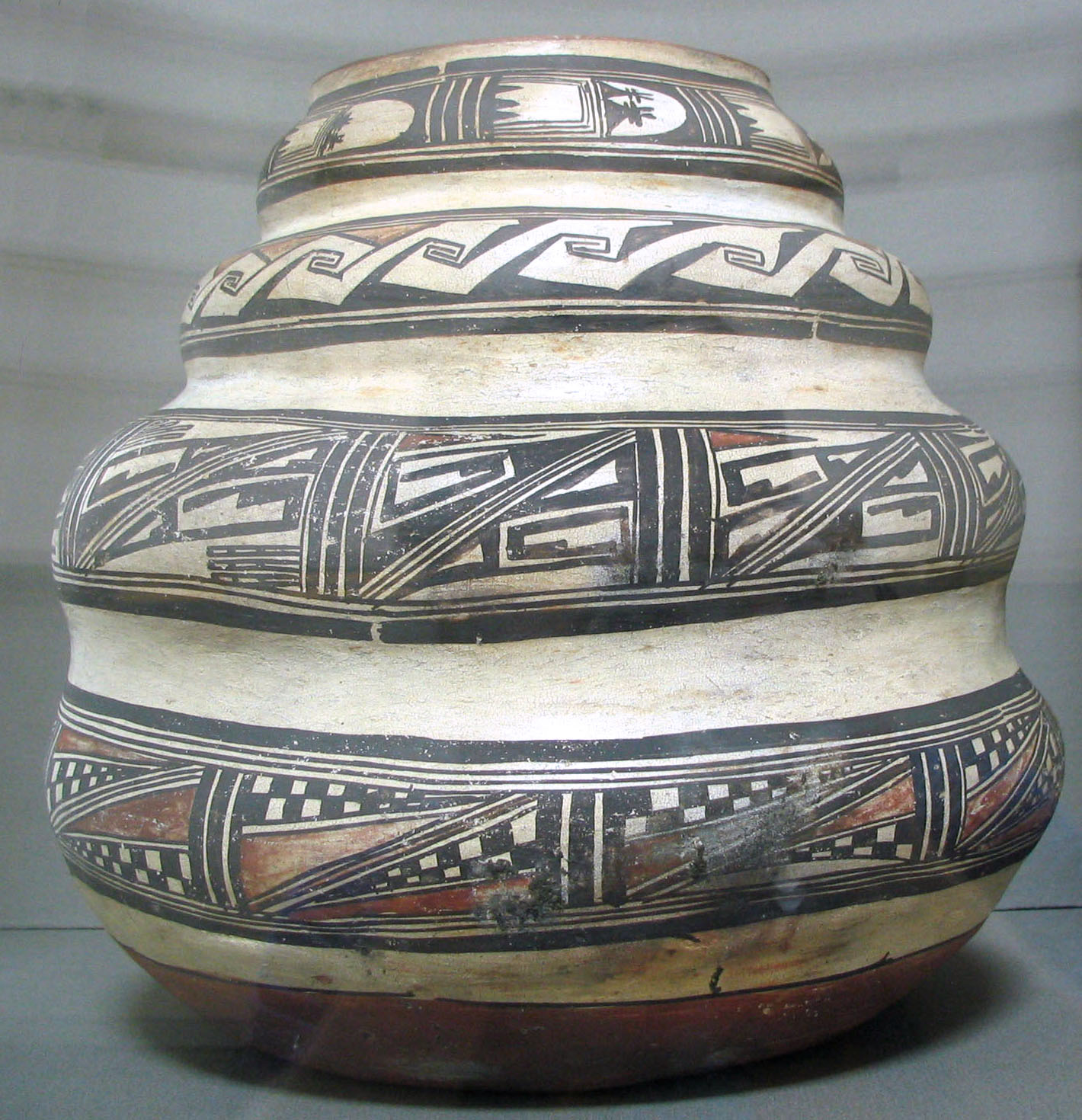
Jar made by Nampeyo about 1880

=== Santa Clara pottery ===
Santa Clara pottery is distinguished for its red polychrome and shiny black pottery. It is also known for the having designs carved into the clay when the piece has dried to "leather hard."

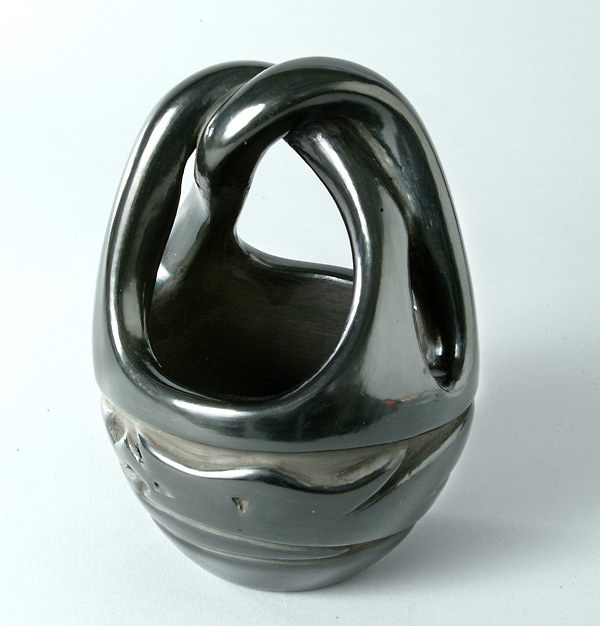
Double handed awanyu bowl. Made by Florence Browning. Source: National Park Service

=== San Ildefonso pottery ===
San Ildefonso pottery in noted for the black-on-black pottery brought to the San Ildefonso Pueblo in the early 20th century by Maria Martinez and her husband Julian Martinez when they rediscovered how to make the pottery.

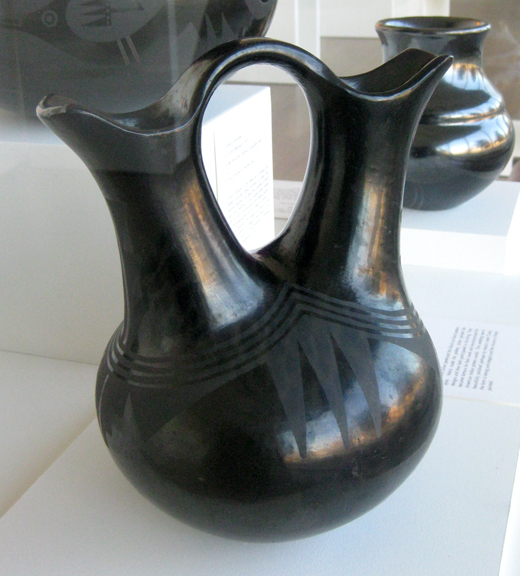
Maria and Julian Martinez matte-on-glossy blackware wedding vase, c. 1929, collection of the Fred Jones Jr. Museum of Art

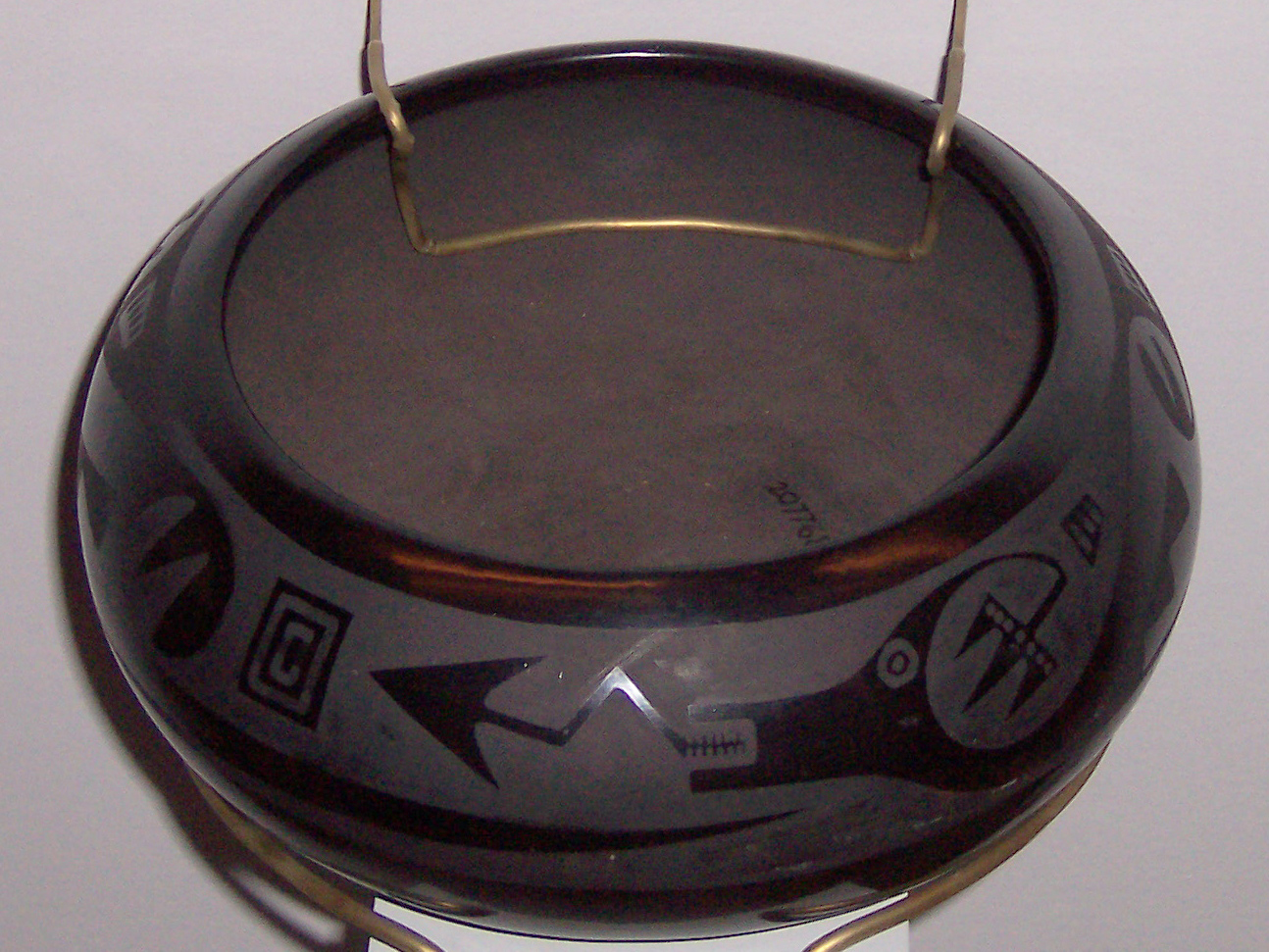
Black-on-Black pottery of the pueblo. Artifact at the Field Museum, Chicago.

=== Taos pottery ===
Juanita Suazo Dubray, a lifelong resident of Taos Pueblo, is a Native American potter who makes micaceous pottery, upholding the tradition of her mother and their ancestors. Dubray added an element of sculptural relief with icons of corn, turtles, lizards, and kiva steps in relief.

=== Zuni pottery ===
Zuni pottery is made from local clay which receives a ritualistic vow of thanks before it is gathered. It is painted with home-made organic dyes, using a traditional yucca brush. The intended function of the pottery dictates its shape and images painted on its surface. Firing of the pottery was usually a community enterprise, silence or communication in low voices was considered essential in order to maintain the original "voice" of the "being" of the clay, and the purpose of the end product. Sales of pottery and traditional arts provide a major source of income for many Zuni people today. An artisan may be the sole financial support for her immediate family as well as others.

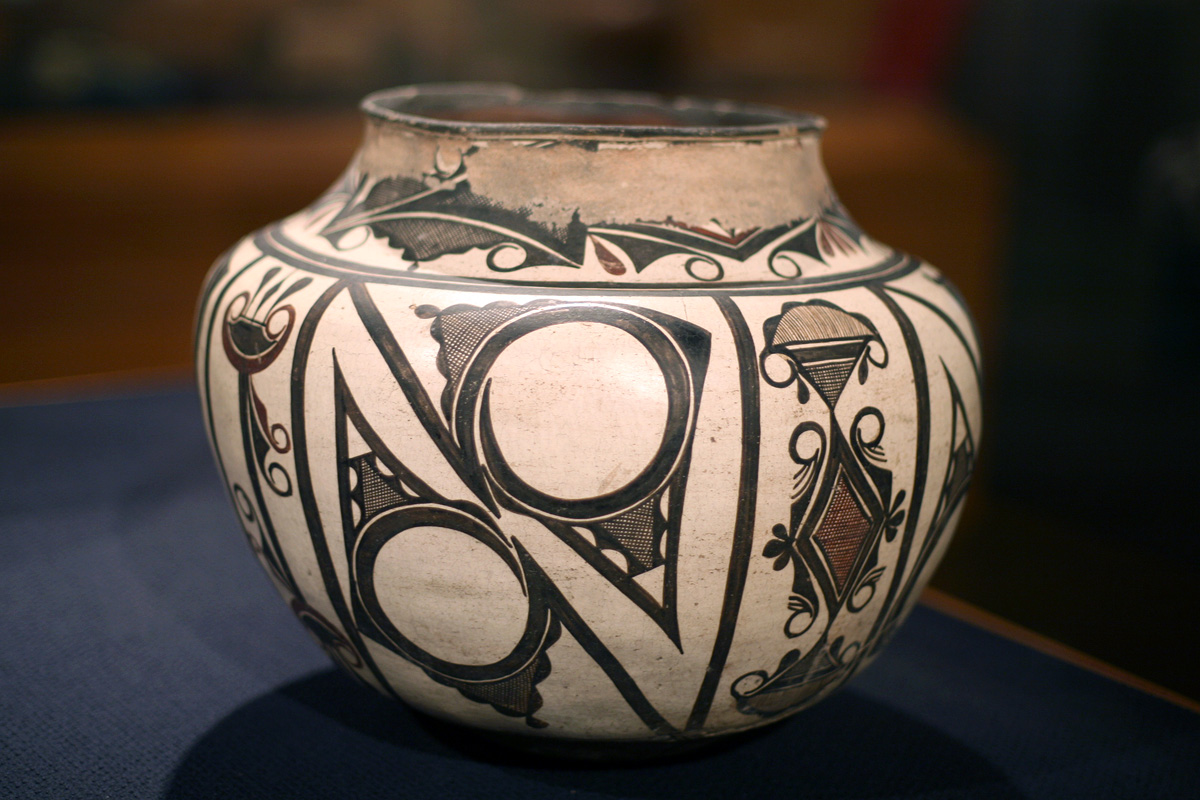
Zuni olla, late 19th or early 20th century, 12.5" high, Brooklyn Museum.

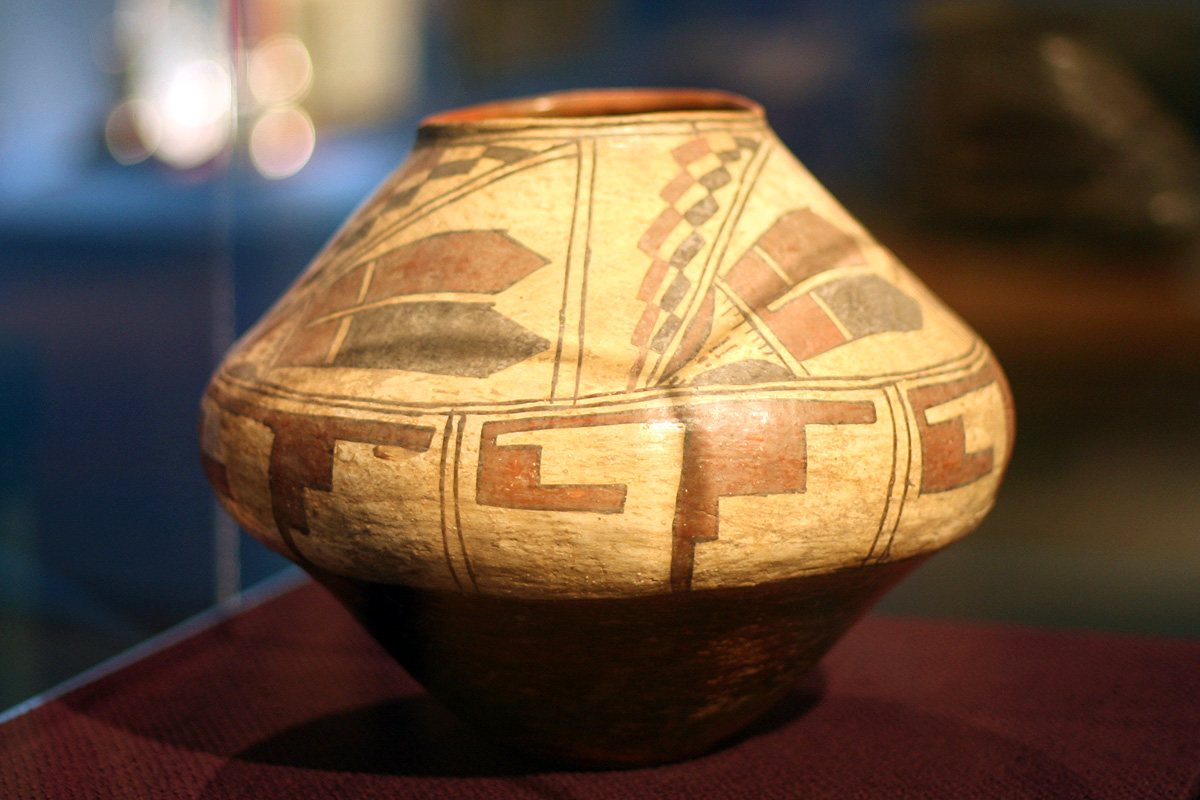
Zuni Ashiwi Polychrome Water Jar, 1700-1750, 11 1/4 x 13 1/4 x 13 1/4 in. Brooklyn Museum.

== Textiles ==
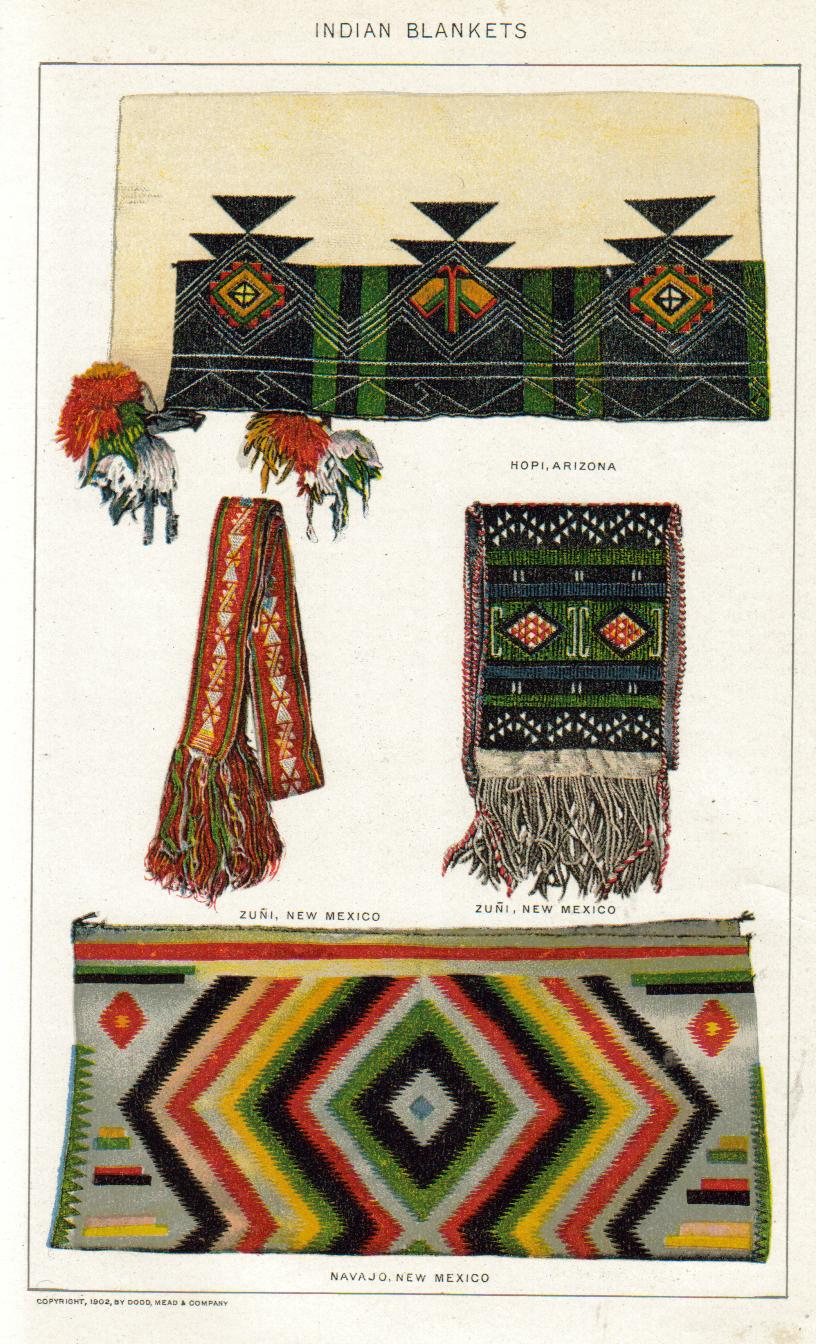
Illustration of a reversed-embroidered Hopi manta, Zuni woven sash, and Navajo loom woven blanket

Dr. Joe Ben Wheat examined thousands of 19th-century textiles, with the goal of establishing "a key for southwestern textiles identification based on the traits that distinguish the Pueblo, Navajo, and Spanish American blanket weaving traditions and provide a better way of identifying and dating pieces of unknown origin.” The years of research resulted in the "groundbreaking" publication of "Blanket Weavings in the Southwest".

=== Navajo weaving ===
Navajo textiles, such as handwoven blankets and rugs, are highly regarded, valued for over 150 years, and an important element of the Navajo economy. Navajo textiles were originally utilitarian blankets for use as cloaks, dresses, saddle blankets, and similar purposes. Toward the end of the 19th century, weavers began to make rugs for tourism and export. Typical Navajo textiles have strong geometric patterns. They are a flat tapestry-woven textile produced in a fashion similar to kilims of Eastern Europe and Western Asia, but the warp is one continuous length of yarn and does not extend beyond the weaving as fringe.

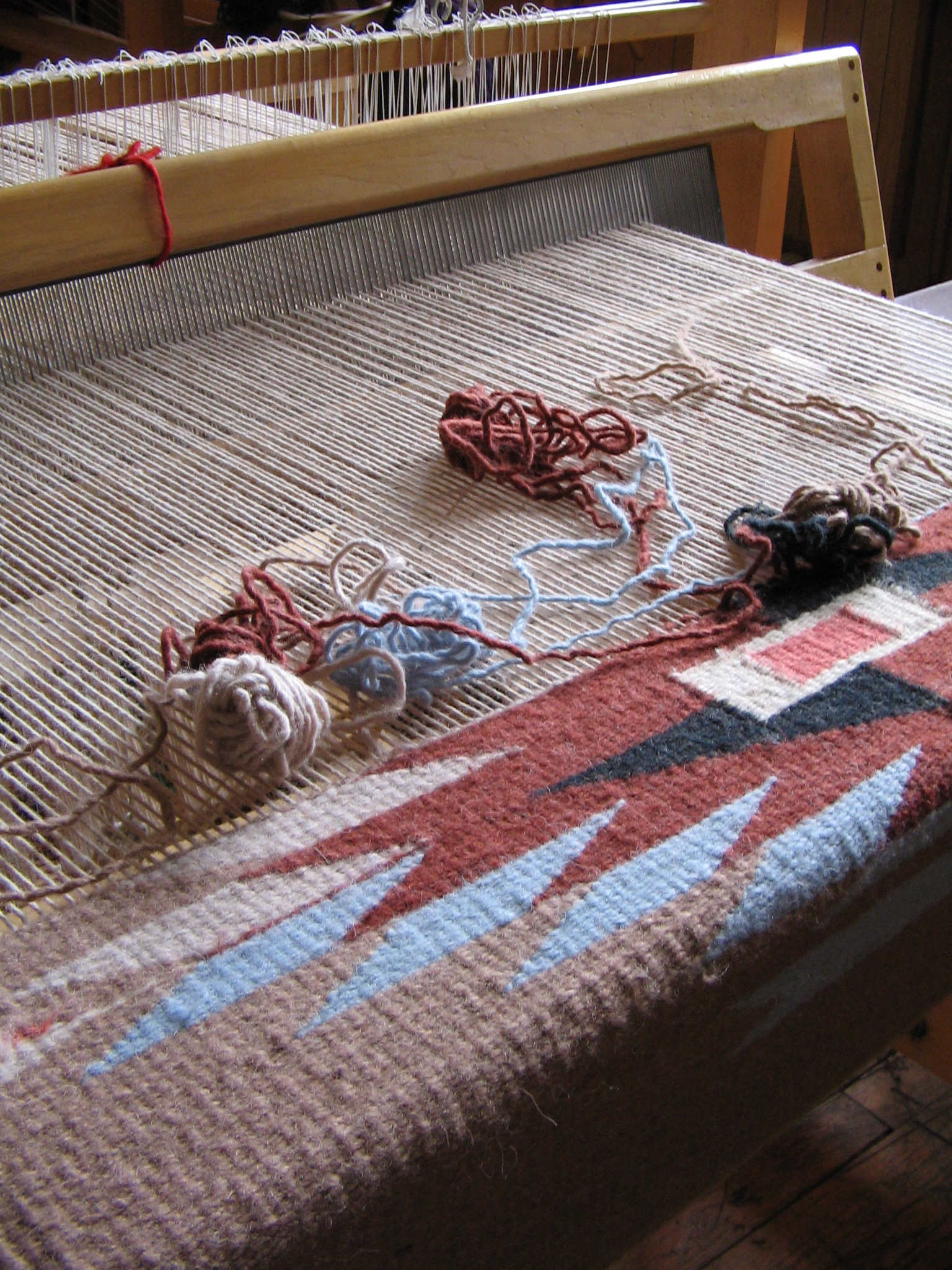
Navajo warp in progress. Source: John Hritz.

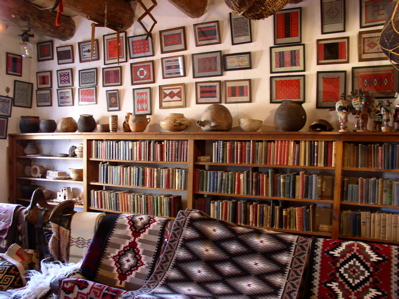
Navajo blankets in the Hubbell Trading Post National Historic Site Ganado, Arizona

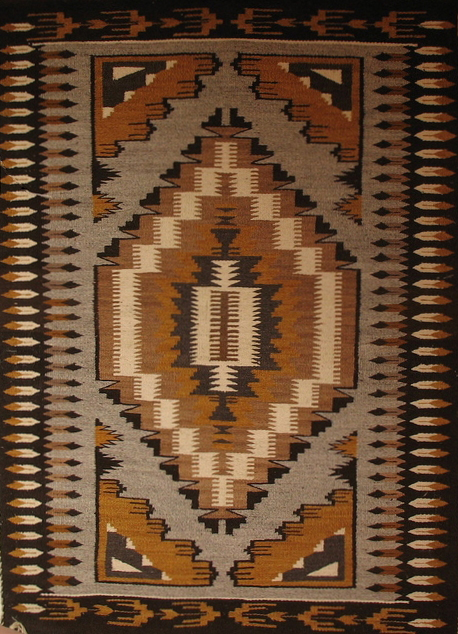
Navajo Rug Source: Teofilo

=== Hopi weaving ===
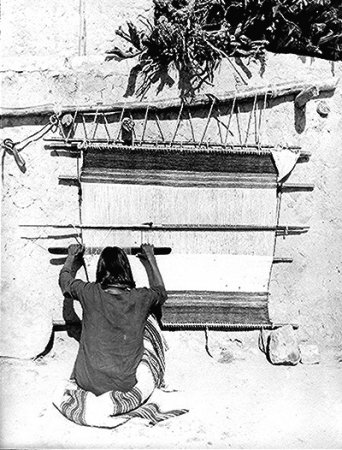
Hopi man weaving with a sley in both hands

== Figures ==
=== Bultos ===
Bultos are three-dimensional, hand-carved religious figures, often of saints, introduced by the Spanish-Mexicans.

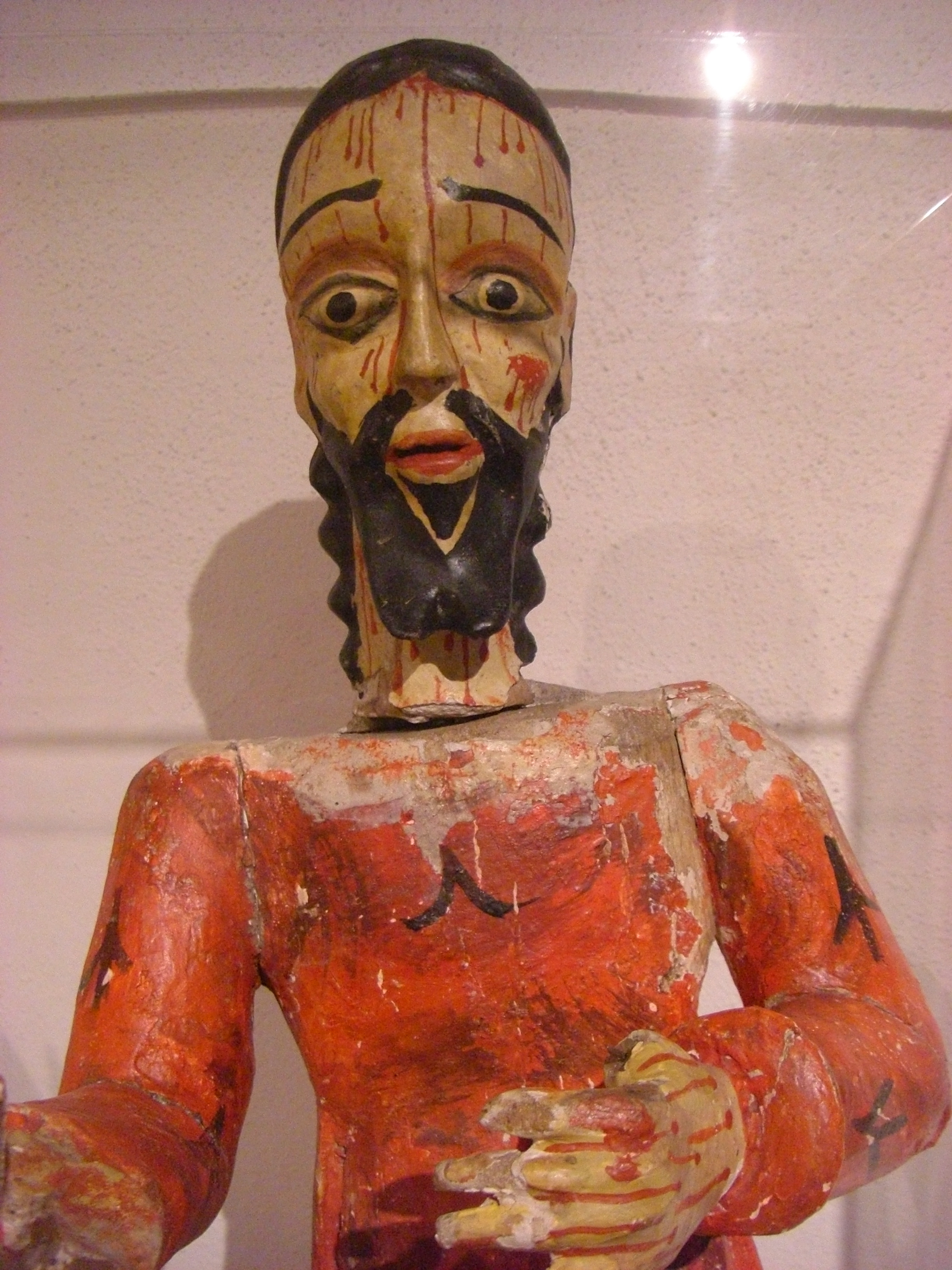
Spanish colonial bulto, Harwood Museum of Art. Source: Jay Cross.

=== Fetishes ===
Hand-carved or naturally formed fetishes that are believed to hold spiritual forces specific to certain animals and have been commonly used in Native American religion and practices. The bear represented the shaman, the buffalo was the provider, the mountain lion was the warrior, and the wolf was the pathfinder.

Frank Hamilton Cushing's publication Zuni Fetishes describes the Zuni world made up of six regions or directions. At the center of each region is a great mountain peak that is a very sacred place. Yellow mountain to the north, blue mountain to the west, red mountain to the south, white mountain to the east, the multi-colored mountain above, and the black mountain below. Each direction is represented by a "Prey God", or guardian animal each having protective or healing powers, and are listed by Cushing as follows: north - the mountain lion, south – the badger, east – the wolf, west – the black bear, the sky or upper – the multi-colored eagle, and the underground or lower – the black mole."

=== Kachina dolls ===
Kachina images appeared in murals in kivas, pictographs and petroglyphs of Puebloan people by AD 1300. The Kachina religion was foundational for modern Zuni and Hopi people.

Zuni and Hopi Kachina dolls are representations of spiritual beings. Hand carved kachina dolls are given to the young girls as gifts given by the Kachina dancers during Kachina ceremonies. 19th century dolls carved with minimum modern tools were finished with abrasive stones and polished smooth with kaolin clay and then painted with natural dyes. Zuni kachinas are believed to live in remote northeastern Arizona and bring life by giving rain and additional support, such as promote success for hunters and farmers, combat depletion of fur-bearing animals over the 19th and 20th centuries, or influence peoples' prosperity or well-being.

There are more than 400 different kachinas in Hopi and Pueblo culture. The local pantheon of kachinas varies in each pueblo community; there may be kachinas for the sun, stars, thunderstorms, wind, corn, insects, and many other concepts.

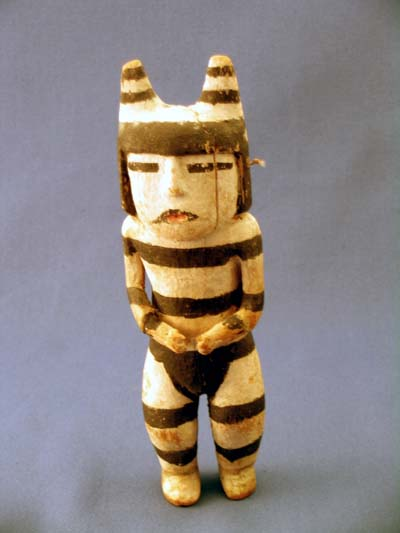
Kachina doll (fetish) of a Koshare, c. 19th century, private collection.

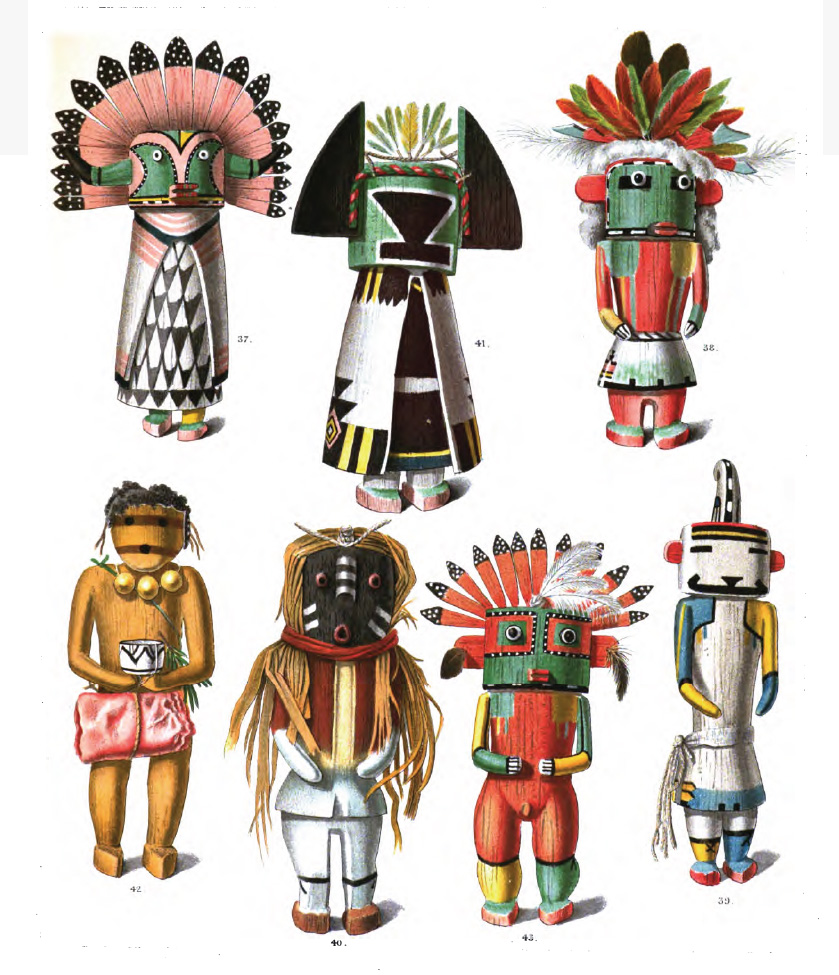
Drawings of kachina dolls, from an 1894 anthropology book.

=== Kokopelli ===
Kokopelli is a hunchbacked flute player who represents the spirit of music and is a Native American fertility deity, sometimes depicted with a phallus, who presides over childbirth and agriculture. Kokopelli is one of the most easily recognized figures found in the petroglyphs and pictographs of the Southwest, the earliest known petroglyph is dated about A.D. 1000. He is often featured in rituals relating to marriage, and Kokopelli himself is sometimes depicted with a woman called Kokopel Mana by the Hopi. Kokopelli chases away winter and brings about the warmth and rains of spring with his flute playing. Among the Hopi, Kokopelli carries unborn children on his back and distributes them to women. His image has been used in rock art, pottery, kachina dolls and more.

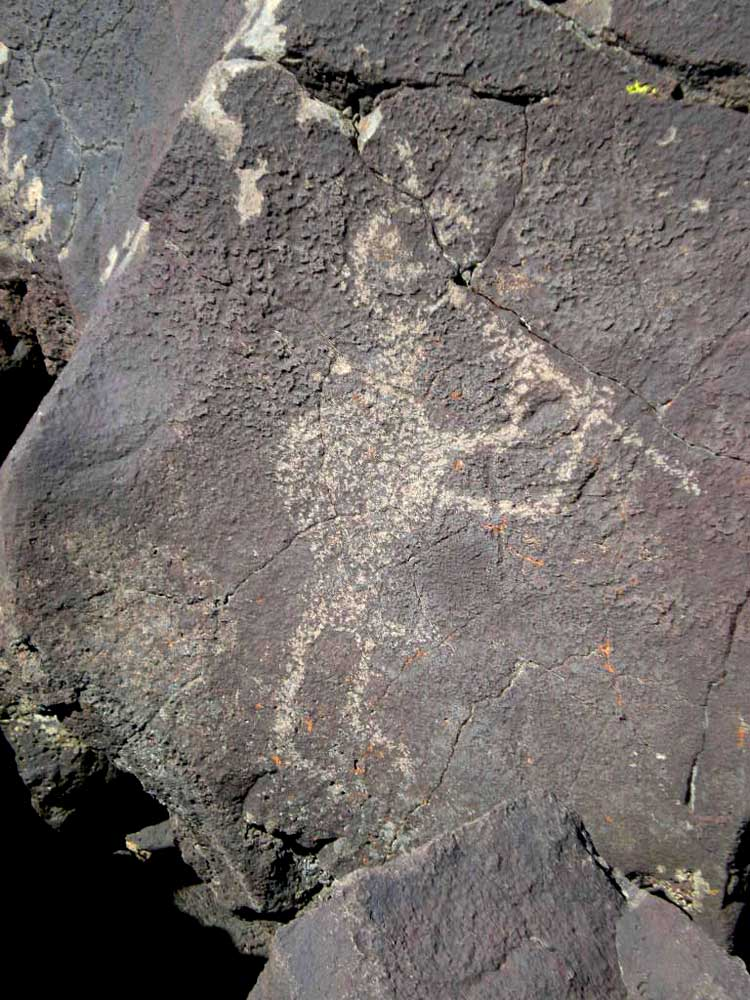
Kokopelli petroglyph, BLM land near Embudo, New Mexico.

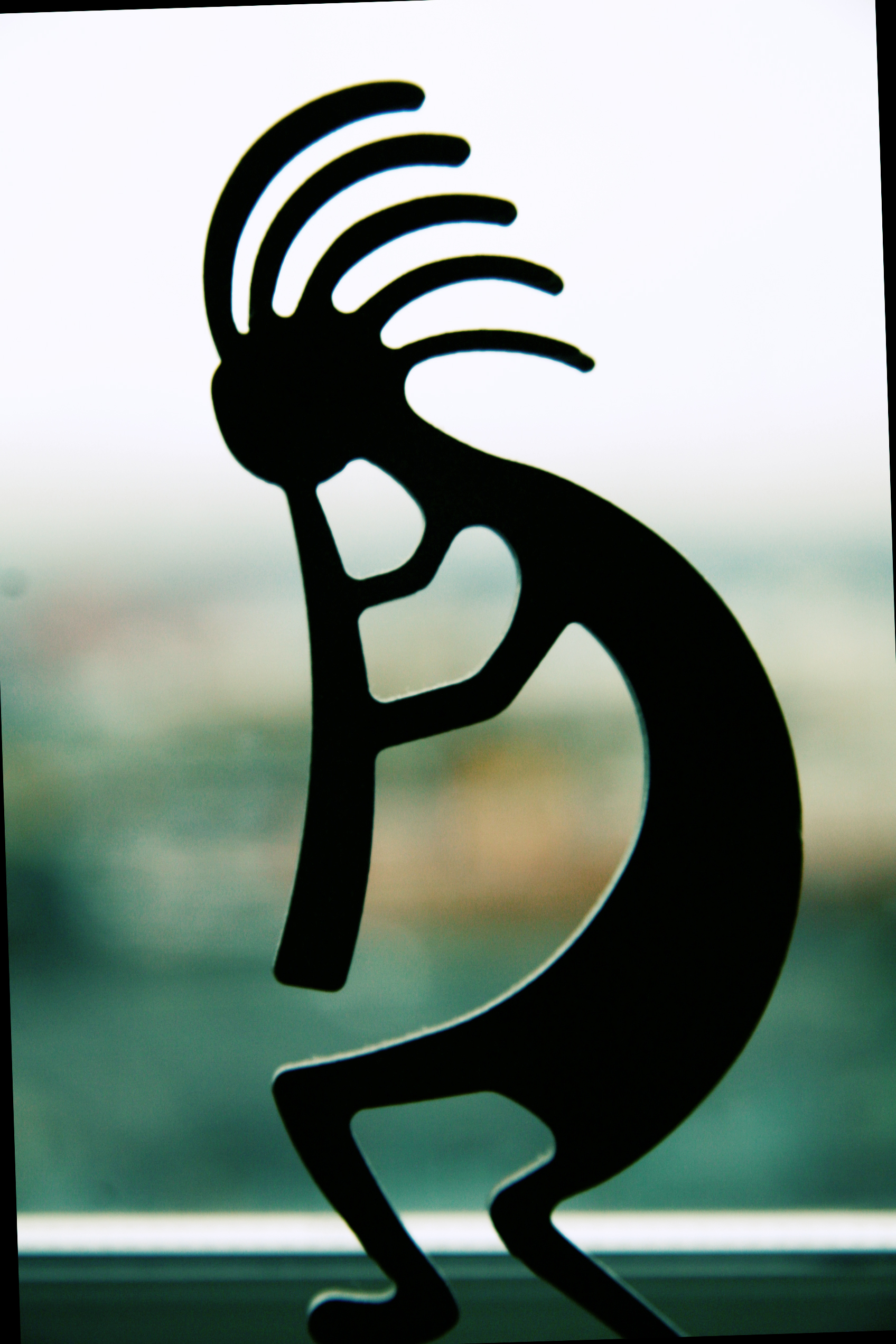
Kokopelli.

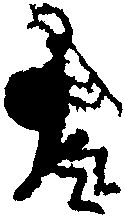
Phallic Kokopelli

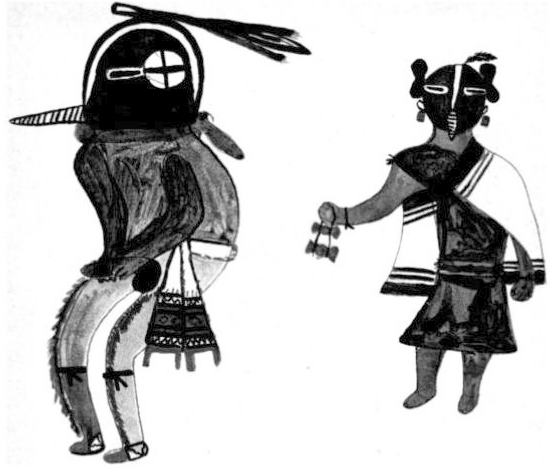
Kokopelli and Kokopelli Mana

=== Dolls and toys ===
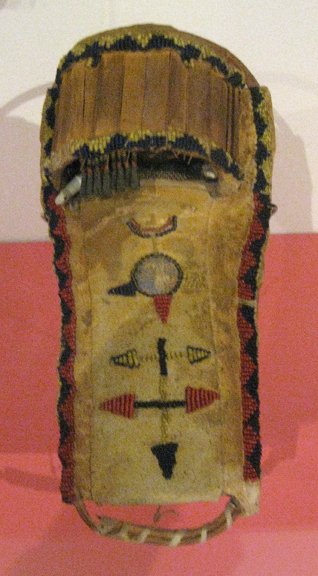
White Mountain Apache doll in toy cradleboard, mesquite, cloth, beads, tin, porcelein, yarn, Heard Museum

Navajo dolls were made by Navajo women based upon full dresses worn by east coast American women in the 1860s. Velvet was substituted for the satin and buttons were made out of nickels and dimes.

==== Storyteller dolls ====
Storyteller doll is a clay figure surrounded by figures of listening children made by the Pueblo people of New Mexico. The first storyteller doll was made by Helen Cordero of the Cochiti Pueblo to honor of her grandfather, a tribal storyteller.

== Sculpture ==
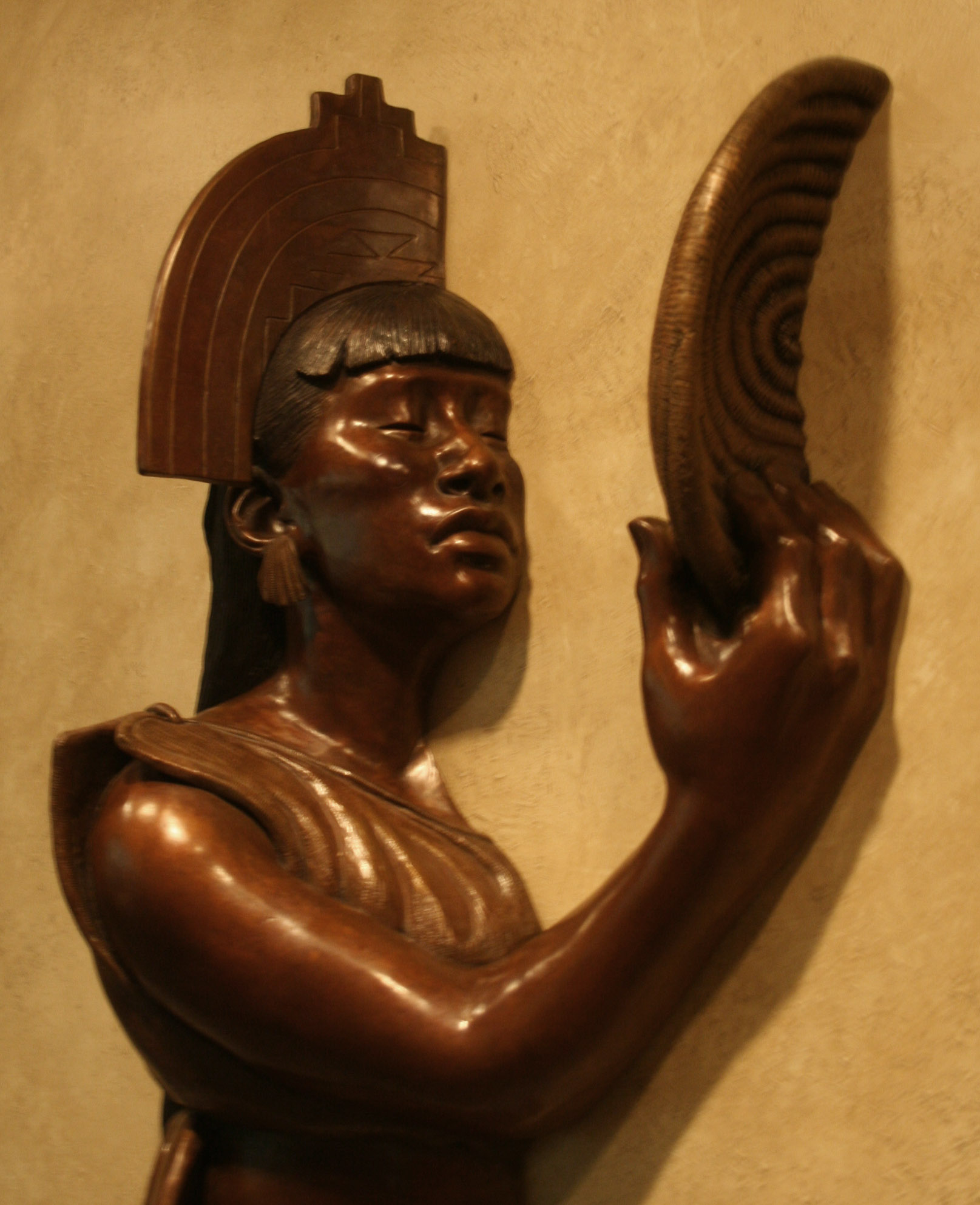
For Life in all Directions, bronze sculpture by Roxanne Swentzell (Santa Clara Pueblo), NMAI

== Jewelry ==
Turquoise, red spiny oyster, and jet have been used in jewelry in the southwest for centuries. Silverwork was introduced through trade in the 19th century, and Atsidi Sani became the Navajo silversmith around 1853. Silversmithing technologies rapidly spread to other tribes. Southwest silverwork includes designs of channel inlay, cluster, mosaic, and petite point and materials of shell, gemstones and beads. While the Navajo favored the squash blossom necklace, they often also combined turquoise, coral, and other semi-precious gemstones. Stones were set into silver scrolls, leaf patterns, and strung on cord for necklaces.

Hopi are renowned for their overlay silver work, developed in the 1940s. Zuni artists are admired for their cluster work jewelry, showcasing turquoise designs, as well as their elaborate, pictorial stone inlay in silver.

=== Beadwork ===
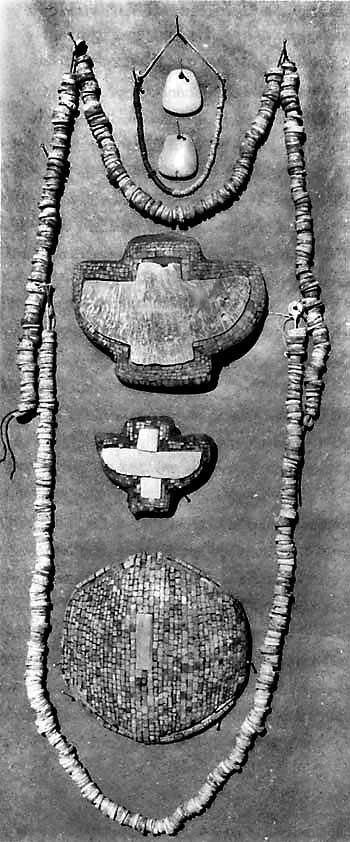
Hohokam turquoise mosaics, found in 1925 in Casa Grande Ruins National Monument, Arizona

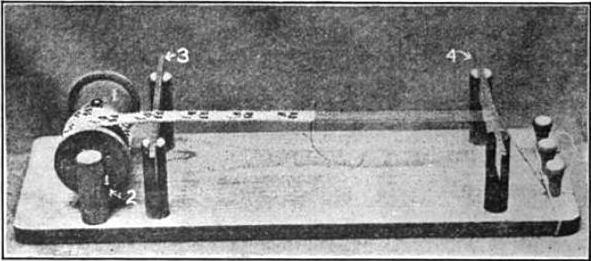
Apache beadloom

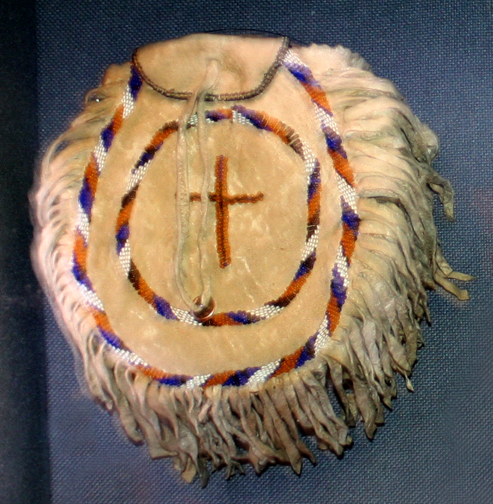
Apache beaded hide bag, Oklahoma History Center

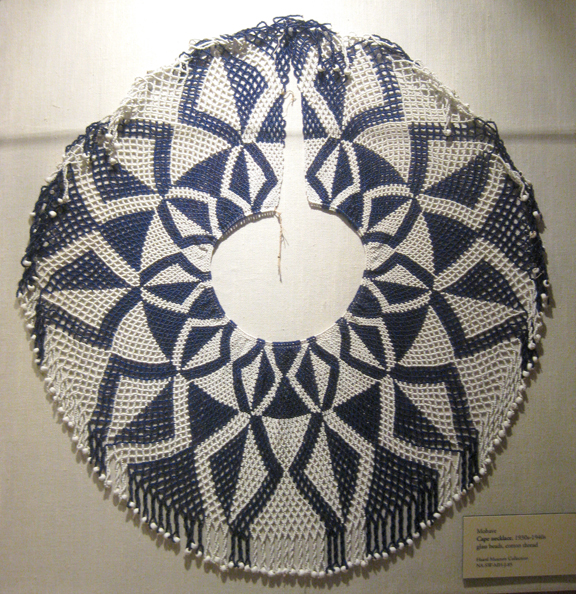
Mojave woman's beaded collar, c. 1930s–1940s, Heard Museum

=== Silverwork ===
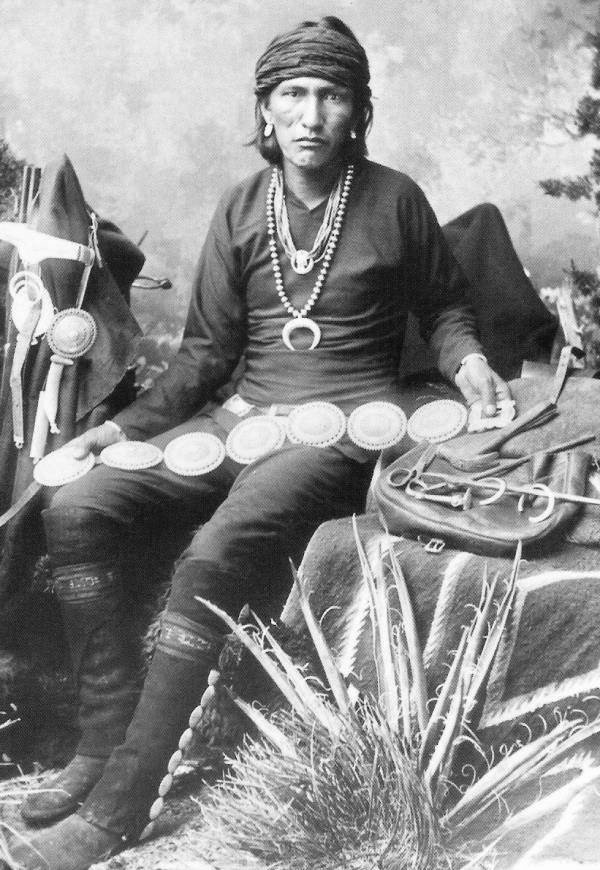
Bai-De-Schluch-A-Ichin or Be-Ich-Schluck-Ich-In-Et-Tzuzzigi "Metal Beater" (Slender Silversmith, Navajo) with silver necklaces, concho belts, and tools, 1883

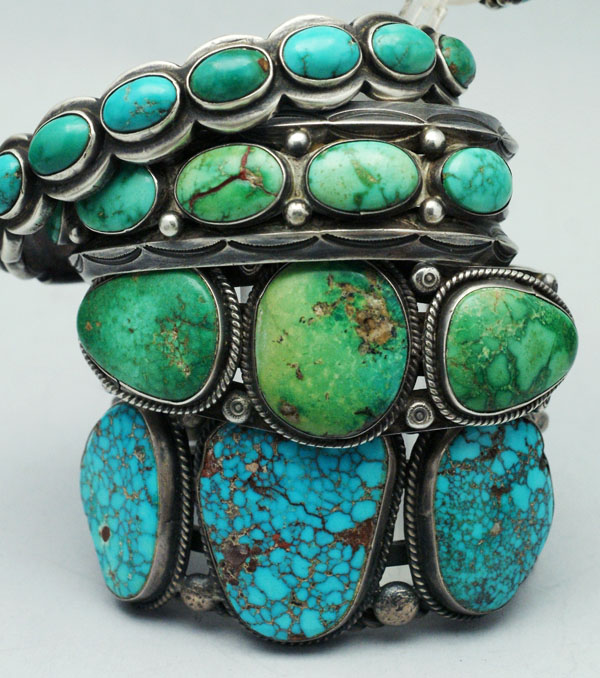
old and new Navajo bracelets with turquoise

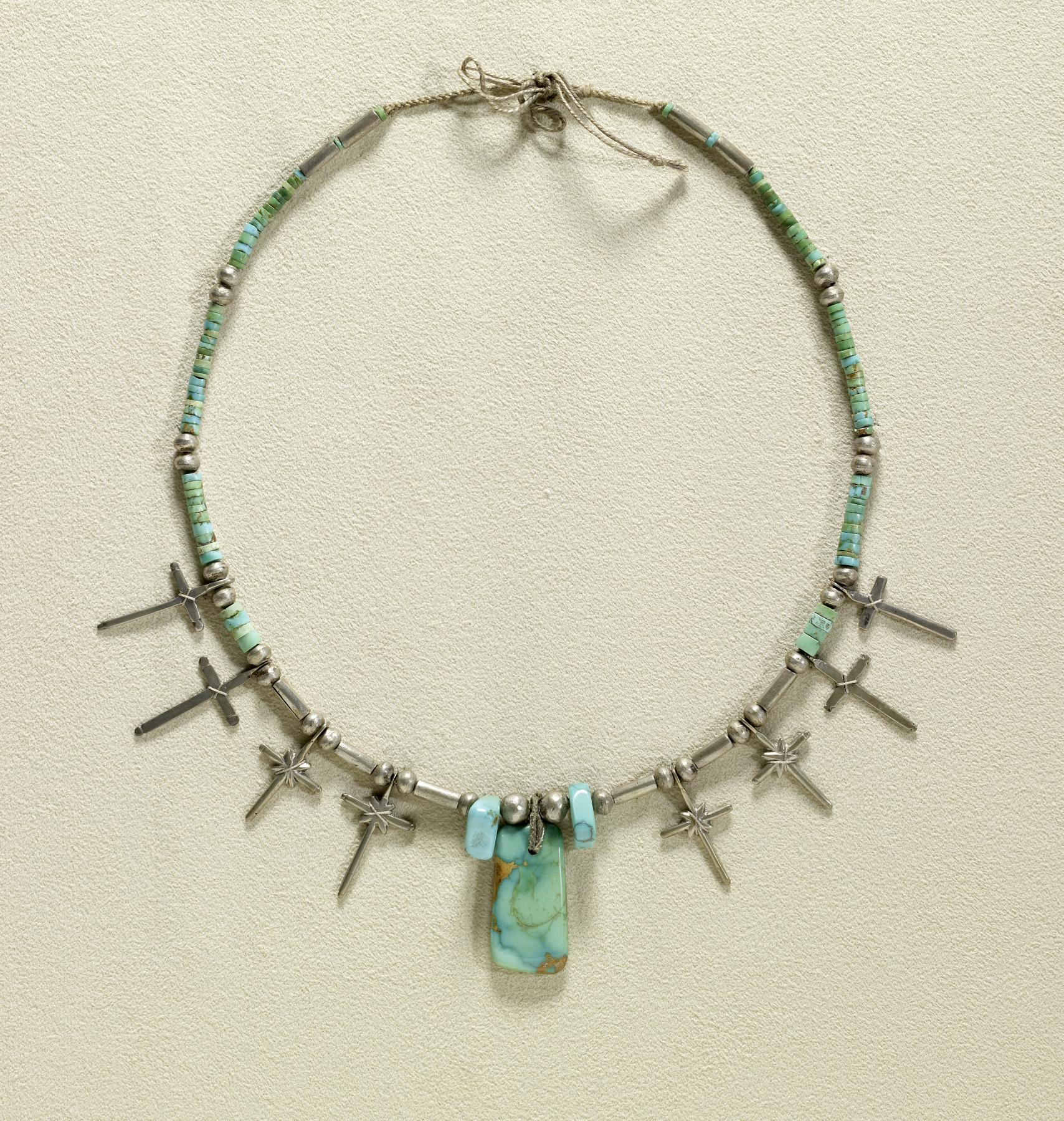
Pueblo necklace with turquoise heishe-style beads, early 20th century, Walters Art Museum

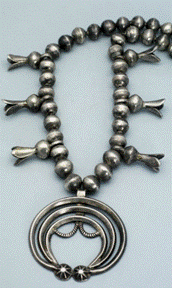
Navajo squash blossom necklace with naja pendant

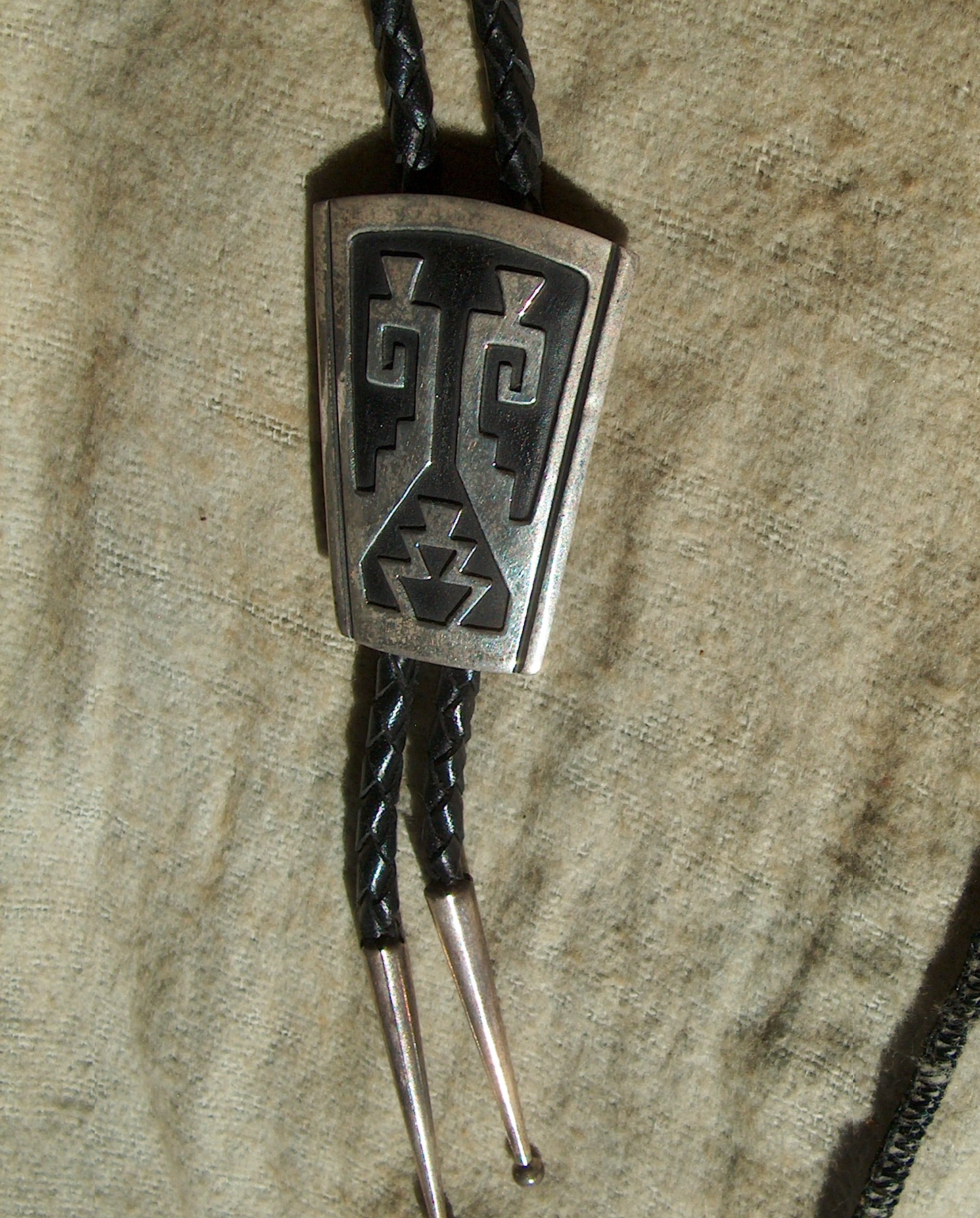
Silver overlay bolo tie, by Tommy Singer (Navajo)

== Spanish tinwork ==
Tinware, likely introduced from Mexico and Spain, was used for religious adornments and household objects, such as sconces and mirrors and became increasingly popular in the mid-19th century.

== Two-dimensional art ==
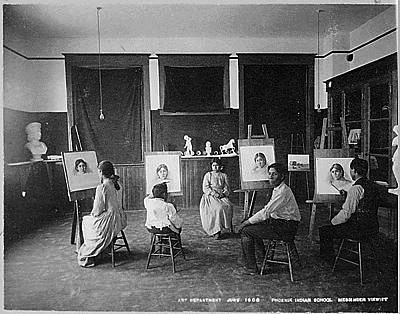
Life drawing class at Phoenix Indian School, 1900

=== Paintings ===
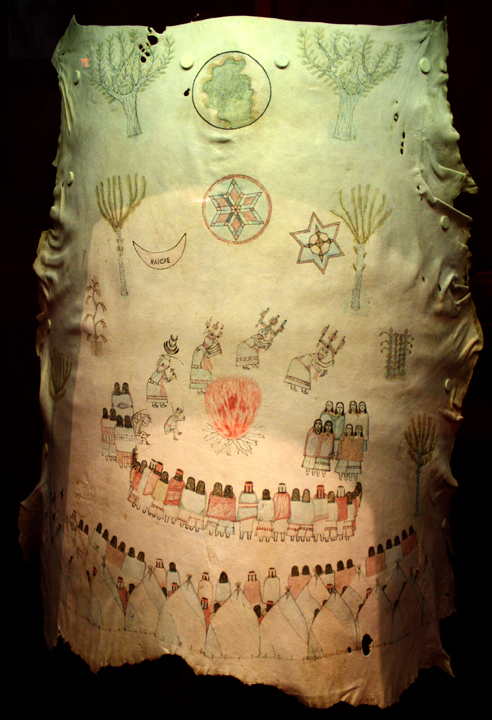
Hide painting by Naiche (Chiricahua Apache), c. 1900, depicting an Apache girl's puberty ceremony, Oklahoma History Center

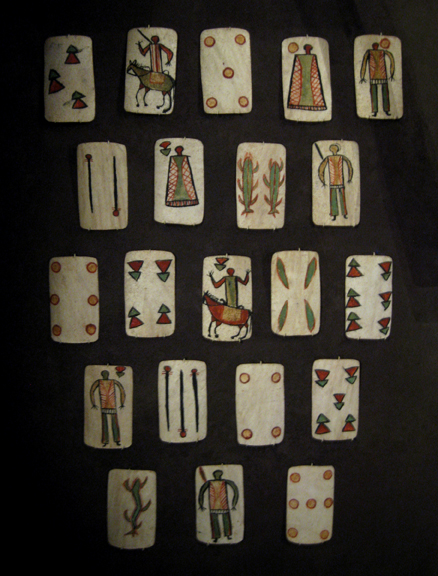
Chiricahua or Western Apache handpainted playing cards, c. 1875-1885, rawhide, Arizona, National Museum of the American Indian

=== Santos ===
Santos, developed in the late 17th century, are religious icons painted on a flat board (retablos) or carved out of wood (bultos).

== Exhibitions and institutions ==
Many annual art events showcase Southwestern art. The Southwestern Association for Indian Arts hosts Indian Market every August in Santa Fe, New Mexico, which began in 1922. Also begun is 1922 is the Gallup Inter-Tribal Indian Ceremonial which features a juried art show and art market, as well many other events, in Gallup, New Mexico. The Heard Museum Guild has held their Indian Art Fair since 1958 in Phoenix, Arizona. The Arizona State Museum on the University of Arizona in Tucson hosts the annual Southwest Indian Art Fair, and the Museum of Northern Arizona in Flagstaff and host major art's festivals for Southwest indigenous and Hispanic peoples. The Santa Fe Spanish Market hosts two annual events, a December Winter Market of experimental Hispanic arts, and a July Spanish Market, showcasing classical Hispanic arts, such as santos, retablos, staw appliqué (popotillo), colcha embroideries, tinwork, ramilletes, and other media.

== See also ==
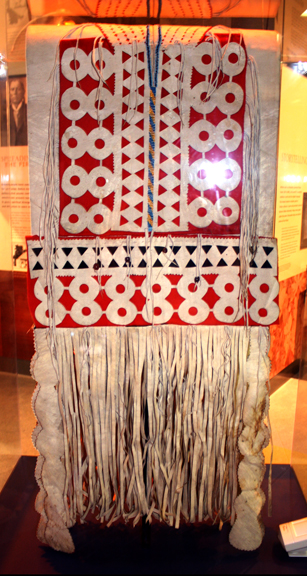
Apache saddlebag made from brain-tanned deerhide on red wool, Oklahoma Historical Society

- Mexican handcrafts and folk art
- Visual art of the United States

=== Communities ===
- Taos art colony, New Mexico
- Puebloan peoples
  - Acoma Pueblo, New Mexico
  - San Ildefonso Pueblo, New Mexico
  - Santa Clara Pueblo, New Mexico
  - Taos Pueblo, New Mexico
  - Zuni Pueblo, New Mexico

=== Events ===
- Dixon Studio Tour (Dixon, New Mexico)

=== Museums ===
- Albuquerque Museum of Art and History, New Mexico
- Amerind Foundation, Arizona
- Anasazi Heritage Center, Colorado
- Heard Museum of Native Cultures and Art, Arizona
- Hopi Cultural Center, Arizona
- Indian Pueblo Cultural Center, New Mexico
- Institute of American Indian Arts, New Mexico
- Millicent Rogers Museum, New Mexico
- Museum of Indian Arts and Culture, New Mexico
- Museum of Northern Arizona, Arizona
- Phoenix Art Museum, Arizona
- Southwest Museum of the American Indian, California
- Wheelwright Museum of the American Indian, New Mexico
