= Kay Bennett =

Kay Bennett may refer to:

- Kay Curley Bennett (1922–1997), also known as Kaibah, Navajo artist and writer from Arizona
- Kay Bennett, fictional character from American soap opera Passions

== See also ==
- Kay
- Bennett (surname)
- Kay Bennett (disambiguation)
