= Kay Curley Bennett =

Navajo artist and writer (1922–1997)

- Born: 1922 near Sheep Springs, New Mexico
- Died: November 18, 1997 (aged 74–75); Gallup, New Mexico
- Spouse: Russell Bennett
- Children: 2
- Awards: Arizona Mother of the Year 1968

Kay Curley Bennett (1922 – November 18, 1997), often known as Kaibah, was a Navajo artist, dollmaker, musician, and writer. She was also an activist and very active in the Navajo community.

== Life ==
Bennett was born in a hogan at Sheepsprings Trading Post near Sheep Springs, New Mexico on the Navajo Reservation. She was born to a traditional Navajo family who herded sheep. She studied at Toadlena Indian School and completed her primary education there. Then in the 1930s the Navajo Livestock Reduction program caused economic hardship for her family, and in 1935 Bennett went to live with a missionary family in California. During World War II, she worked in Long Beach, California at an aircraft plant.

She moved back to New Mexico in the 1940s and became a dorm attendant at Toadlena Indian School. Then, from 1947 to 1952, she worked at the Phoenix Indian School as a teacher, interpreter, and head of special education.

She married Russell C. Bennett, an engineer from Missouri, in 1956. They had two daughters. Bennett was named Arizona's Mother of the Year in 1968, and was the first Native woman in the state to be awarded the honor.

From 1969 to 1972, she was the New Mexico Human Rights Commissioner. From 1974 to 1982, Bennett was on the Inter-Tribal Indian Ceremonial's board of directors. She was a supervisor for student teachers on the reservation from 1976 to 1984. Bennett ran for Chairman of the Navajo Nation in 1984, but was disqualified before the election because she did not live on the Reservation. She ran again in 1990 as a write-in canditate, challenging the rules (which would be changed later) that candidates must live on the Reservation and hold, or have previously held, an office or employment by the tribe. She did not win the election, but set a record as the first woman to run for the position.

Bennett died on November 18, 1997 in Gallup, New Mexico, her town of residence.

== Works ==
While Kaibah did use the name Kay Curley Bennett, she often used her Navajo name, Kaibah, as her artist name.

She wrote and illustrated books, wrote poetry, made Navajo dolls, designed clothing, and recorded music, including traditional Navajo music. She was also a poet and a clothing designer.

=== Music ===
Starting in the 1960s, she self-published her own albums. She made songs in the English and Navajo languages.

==== Discography ====
- Kaibah
- Navajo Love Songs (1970)
- Songs from the Navajo Nation (1992)

=== Writing ===
- Kaibah: Recollections of a Navajo Girlhood (1964) is Bennett's autobiography about her childhood.
- A Navajo Saga (1972) is a historical novel co-written by Bennett and her husband. It is noted as a well-researched account of Navajo history in the 1860s–including the Long Walk and the Treaty of Bosque Redondo–from a Navajo perspective.
- Keesh, the Navajo Indian Cat (1989) is a children's book, written and illustrated by Bennett.

== Legacy ==
Some of Kaibah's artwork (including her dolls) have been shown in art exhibitions in the United States. One of her dolls is displayed at Canyon Records, a Native American record label based in Phoenix, Arizona.
