= Straw painting =

Images made by weaving straw

Straw paintings are craft objects made by shaping straw into patterns and representational images.

By modeling and playing with straw, people, especially women, started weaving straw into artistic objects. As time passed, they acquired more skill in working with straw and a century ago, created a very specific art, the art of weaving straw into pictures by using and combining the natural colours and shades of oats, barley, rye, wheat, and other grasses. These "paintings" have become a speciality of Kerala, China, Mexico, and Subotica in Serbia and its vicinity.

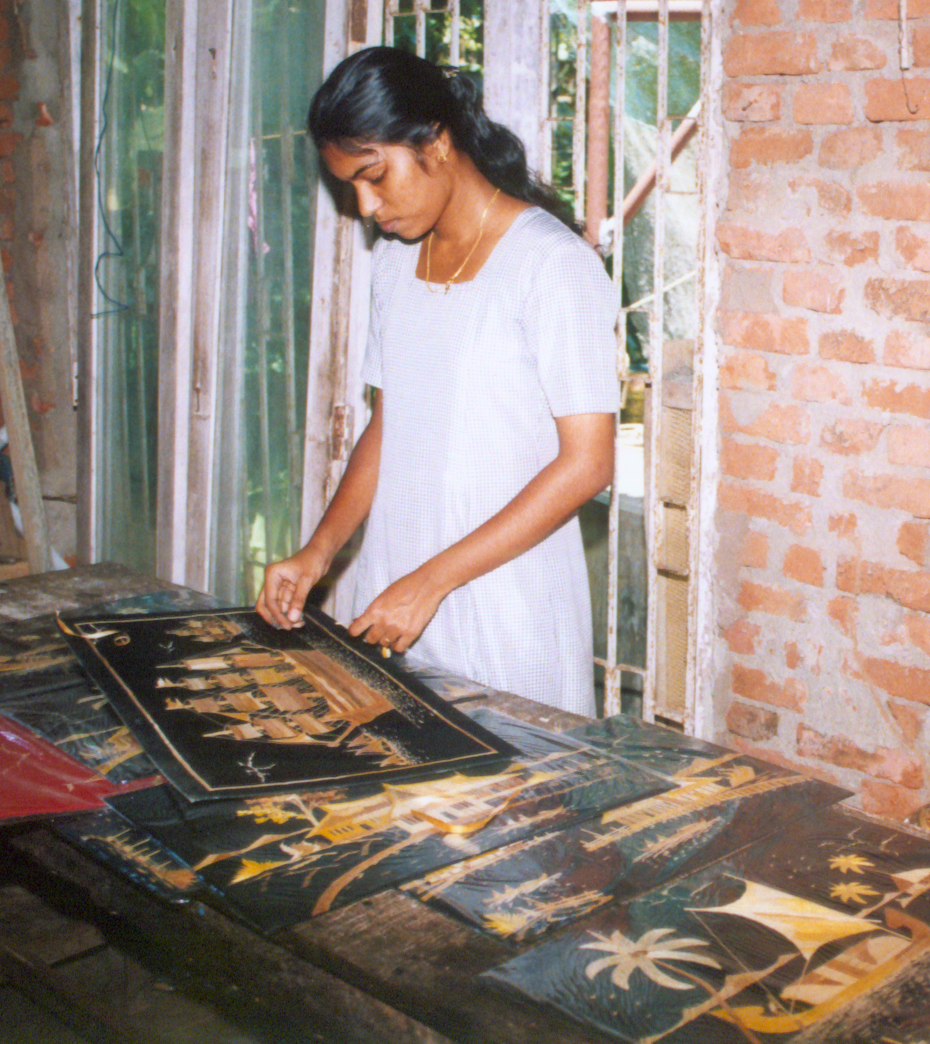
Girl making staw art in Kerala

== China ==
Straw patchwork art is a Chinese folk art that dates back to the Han dynasty (250—230 CE) and developed during Sui dynasty of 581—618 CE. In China, it is a unique form of art from the Han Chinese. In ancient China, wheat was perceived as sacred; the wheat-straw patchwork were rare and were therefore only sent to the royal court as tribute. As early as in Eastern Han dynasty, wheat straw painting was made for worship practices in the royal court as wheat was considered an auspicious grass to pray for good fortune. The craft disappeared with time as a result of social unrest and historical changes and only officially returned during the Sui and Tang dynasties. In Sui dynasty, it was an imperial form of craft. During the Song dynasty (960—1127 CE), straw patchwork was enjoyed by royalty. The art was lost again in time, and later reappeared in the provinces of Henan, Guangdong, and Heilongjiang.

In Heilongjiang, the art was revived in the 1960s when young artists were dispatched to Fujian, Shandong, Zhejiang, and Shanxi to learn wheat painting and innovated the practice to make a form of wheat straw painting with Harbin characteristics.

In Henan, the art was revived in 1980s by the folk artist, Liu Limin, a Henan resident, after many failed attempts.

Wheat straw is smoked, steams, whitening, dyed, cut, and altered in a myriad of procedures to fashion delicate representational works. Today wheat straw patchwork is a decorative art and popular item for tourists to China.

== Mexico and southern California ==
Roberto D. Mejia creating a popotillo (straw) painting at the 2015 Feria Maestros del Arte

In Mexico, straw mosaics are known as "popotillo art," from the Spanish name for sacaton grass, Sporobolus, or popote de cambray. The art form has Precolumbian roots. The popotillo may also be a fusion of Chinese straw art and the Royal Aztec Feather Art; the Chinese influence may have come from the Chinese immigrants who were brought to Mexico in the late 1800s to build the Mexican train system and contributed to the cultural fusion in some aspects of life such as folk art and cuisine.

The grass grows in states of Mexico, Morelos, Hidalgo, and Puebla. Mexico City is the center of popotillo art, and several award-winning artists have formed a workshop, "Popotillo y Color," there. While common in the 19th century, popotillo art enjoyed the most popularity in the 1930s and 1940s in Mexico City. Popotillo workshops have been offered in Los Angeles, California by Francisco J Fraide.

The grass is first hand-dyed. Before European contact, exclusively natural dyes were used and the straw was soaked in aguamiel or agave juice. Then the artist draws a design, which is then covered by a fine layer of "cera de Campeche," a special type of beeswax. The straw is then cut down to workable sizes, sometimes as fine as a single millimeter in length. The artist then carefully presses the pieces of straw into the beeswax. When the design is finished, a fixative is applied to protect the finished work.

== See also ==
- Corn dolly
- Straw marquetry
- Straw mobile
- Straw plaiting
