= Navajo dolls =

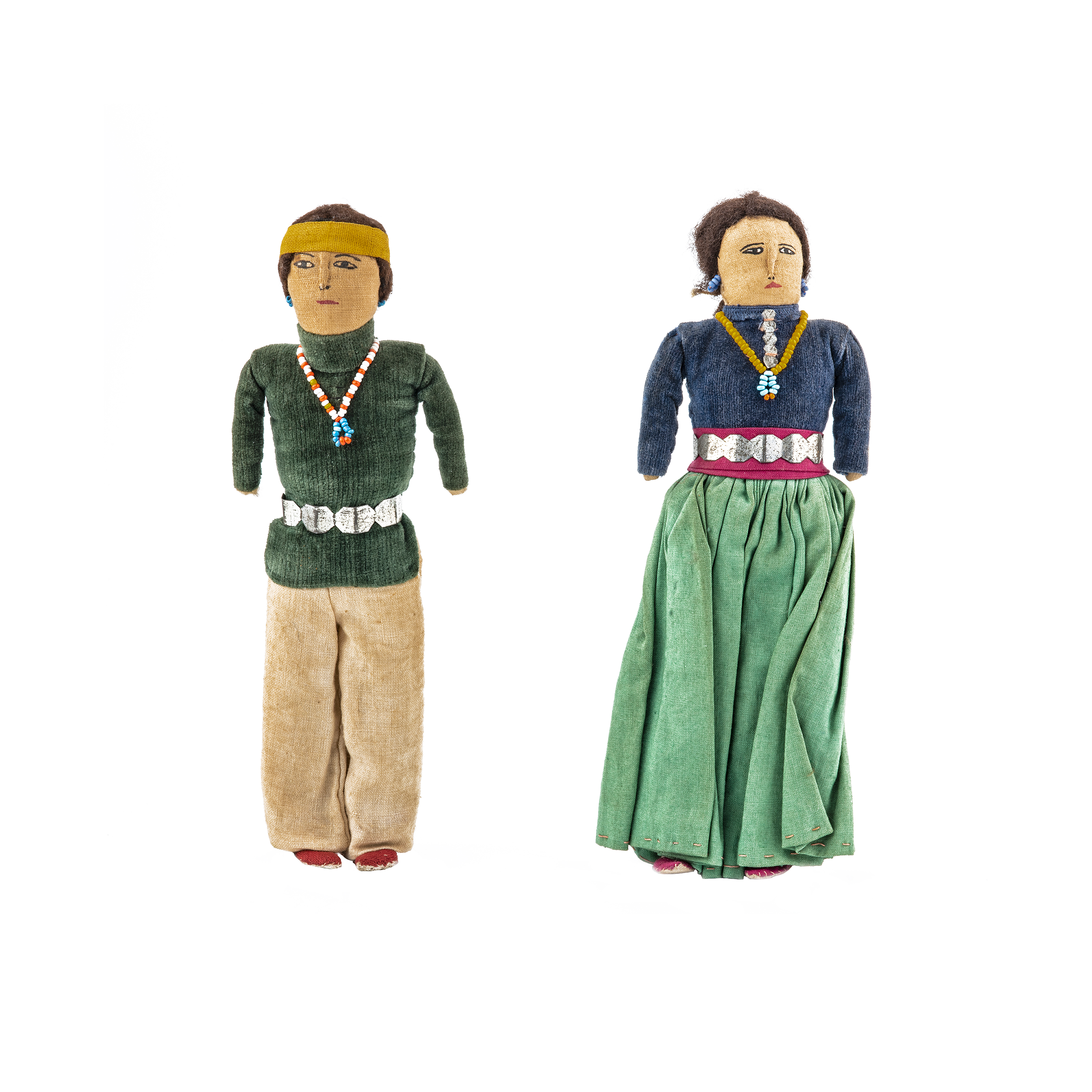
A pair of vintage Navajo dolls. Circa 1940s

Dolls made by Navajo people, beyond their aesthetic appeal, serve as cultural artifacts reflecting the Navajo people's adaptation and creativity. In the 1860s, Navajo women embraced elements from East Coast American fashion. Women of that era wore full dresses made out of satin, which Navajo women copied using velvet, with buttons made out of nickels and dimes. This style is still worn today by both Navajos and non-Navajos.

== See also ==
- Navajo weaving
- Native American fashion
