= Marie Z. Chino =

American artist

- Born: 1907
- Died: November 10, 1982 (aged 74–75)
- Known for: Potter
- Movement: Revival of the Mimbres, Tularosa, and Anasazi cultures' pottery forms; matriarch of the Chino family of potters
- Spouse: Lorenzo Chino
- Awards: Lifetime Achievement Award, Southwestern Association for Indian Arts, 1998

Marie Zieu Chino (1907 – November 10, 1982) was a Native American potter from Acoma Pueblo, New Mexico. Marie and her friends Lucy M. Lewis and Jessie Garcia are recognized as the three most important Acoma potters during the 1950s. Along with Juana Leno, they have been called "The Four Matriarchs" who "revived the ancient style of Acoma pottery." The inspiration for many designs used on their pottery were found on old potsherds gathered to use for temper. Together they led the revival of ancient pottery forms including the Mimbres, Tularosa and other various cultures in the Anasazi region. This revival spread to other potters who also accepted the old styles, which led to new innovative designs and variations of style and form.

== Career ==
In 1922, Marie won her first award at the Santa Fe Indian Market at the age of fifteen. She went on to receive numerous awards for her pottery from 1970 to 1982. In 1998 the Southwestern Association for Indian Arts recognized Marie with a "Lifetime Achievement Award."

Marie became particularly well known for her fine-line black-on-white pottery and vases with the step design. Her pots were distinctive in their complex geometric designs as well as the combination of life forms and abstract symbols. Some of her favorite designs include: Mimbres animals, Tularosa swirls, Acoma parrots, rainbows, bushes with berries, leaves, rain, clouds, lightning and fine-line snowflakes.

Marie was the matriarch of the Chino family of potters. She helped her children and grandchildren learn the fine art of pottery making and had many students. Marie had five daughters who were potters, "of whom Grace, Carrie and Rose achieved reputations as excellent potters." Pottery by her daughter Vera Chino is held by the Holmes Museum of Anthropology.

When Marie traveled to the Indian art shows or the Indian Market in Santa Fe, she often took her family with her. There they met people from around the world who loved to collect their pottery. This instilled a sense of pride and unity throughout the Chino family. Marie's descendants have carried on the tradition of making fine Acoma pottery.

== Collections ==
Marie's work is held by the Albuquerque Museum, Holmes Museum of Anthropology, the Spurlock Museum, the National Museum of the American Indian and the National Museum of Women in the Arts in Washington, D.C. In 2022, Chino's earthenware bowl was featured in the exhibit "Connections: Contemporary Craft at the Renwick Gallery.

== Awards ==
1979 Indian Arts and Crafts Exhibit. Heard Museum. Phoenix, AZ. Class VII - Pottery, Div. A - Traditional. Award Winner. 1979 (1979).

1976 Heard Museum Guild Indian Arts and Crafts Exhibit: Best of New Mexico Pueblo Pottery. Awarded for artwork: Seed pot. Heard Museum. Phoenix, Arizona. November 25, 1976.

1976 Heard Museum Guild Indian Arts and Crafts Exhibit, Classification X - Pottery, Division A - Traditional shapes and designs: First Place. Awarded for artwork: Seed pot. Heard Museum. Phoenix, Arizona. November 25, 1976.

1970 Ninth Scottsdale National Indian Arts Exhibition. Executive House. Scottsdale, AZ. Section B - Crafts, Class. VIII - Pottery, Div. A - Traditional, Section 2 - New Mexico, First Place. 1970 (02/28/1970).

1968 Invitational Exhibit of Indian Arts and Crafts - Pottery: First. Awarded first with a clay pottery design of a canteen. Center for Arts of Indian America. Washington, D.C. November 17, 1968 - December 13, 1968. Note: fourth invitational and held at the Gallery of the Department of the Interior.

1968 Seventh Scottsdale National Indian Arts Exhibition. Executive House. Scottsdale, AZ. Section B - Crafts, Class. IX - Pottery, Div. A - Traditional, Section 2, New Mexico, Honorable Mention. 1968 (03/1968).
