= Museum of Man =

Museum of Man may refer to:

- Indira Gandhi Rashtriya Manav Sangrahalaya, Bhopal, Madhya Pradesh, India
- Canadian Museum of History, Gatineau, Quebec, Canada (formerly the "Museum of Man")
- Lowell D. Holmes Museum of Anthropology, of Wichita State University, in Kansas, USA (formerly named the Museum of Man)
- Musée de l'Homme (English: "Museum of Man"), Paris, France
- Museum of Us, anthropology and pre-Columbian museum in San Diego, California (formerly named "San Diego Museum of Man")

== See also ==
- Manitoba Museum of Man and Nature, Winnipeg, Manitoba, Canada
- Category:Museums in the Isle of Man
- Museum of Man and the Environment in the Palazzo Pretorio of Terra del Sole in Italy
- Museum of Man and Nature, Munich, Bavaria
- Museum of the Mountain Man, Pinedale, Wyoming, USA
