= Aaku =

Aaku may refer to:

- Aaku, Finnish given name for "Augie", derived from Augustus
- Aa'ku, Western Keresan name for New Mexico's Acoma Pueblo
