= McCartys Village, New Mexico =

- Census-designated place
- Location within New Mexico
- Coordinates: 35°03′41″N 107°39′48″W
- Country: United States
- State: New Mexico
- County: Cibola

Area
  - Total: 3.21 sq mi (8.31 km^{2})
  - Land: 3.21 sq mi (8.31 km^{2})
  - Water: 0 sq mi (0.00 km^{2})
- Elevation: 6,152 ft (1,875 m)

Population (2020)
  - Total: 360
  - Density: 112.3/sq mi (43.34/km^{2})
- Time zone: UTC-7 (Mountain (MST))
  - Summer (DST): UTC-6 (MDT)
- Area code: 505
- FIPS code: 35-45690
- GNIS feature ID: 2585648

McCartys Village is a census-designated place (CDP) in Cibola County, New Mexico, consisting of the unincorporated community known as McCartys. As of the 2020 census, McCartys Village had a population of 360. It is part of the Acoma Pueblo.

== Geography ==
McCartys is located in northern Cibola County in the valley of the Rio San Jose, an east-flowing tributary of the Rio Puerco. Indian Service Route 30 passes through the center of the community. Interstate 40 forms the northwestern edge of the CDP, with the nearest access from Exit 96, 1.5 miles (2.4 km) to the northeast. Old U.S. Route 66 runs parallel to I-40 along the edge of McCartys. Grants, the Cibola County seat, is 12 miles (19 km) to the northwest.

According to the United States Census Bureau, the CDP has a total area of 0.20 square miles (0.52 km^{2}), all land.

== Demographics ==
Historical population
Census	Pop.	Note	%±
2020	360		—
U.S. Decennial Census

== Education ==
All public schools in the county are operated by Grants/Cibola County Schools.
