= Vera Chino =

American artist

Vera Chino Ely
- Born: June 27, 1943 (age 82); Acoma Pueblo, New Mexico

Vera Chino Ely (born June 27, 1943) is a Native American potter from Acoma Pueblo, New Mexico. She is the youngest daughter of Marie Z. Chino, who was also a potter. Vera learned from her mother.

In the late 1970s she worked with her mother doing fine-line painting on some of her pots. In 1979, she participated in the "One Space: Three Visions" exhibition at the Albuquerque Museum. A collection of her works can be seen at the Peabody Museum of Archaeology and Ethnology at Harvard University in Cambridge, Massachusetts.

Vera's sisters, Carrie Charlie (b. 1925), Rose Garcia (b. 1928), and Grace Chino (c. 1929–1994), are all award-winning Acoma potters.
