= Acoma Pueblo =

Native American tribe, settlement, and reservation in New Mexico, U.S.

- Acoma
- U.S. National Register of Historic Places
- U.S. National Historic Landmark District
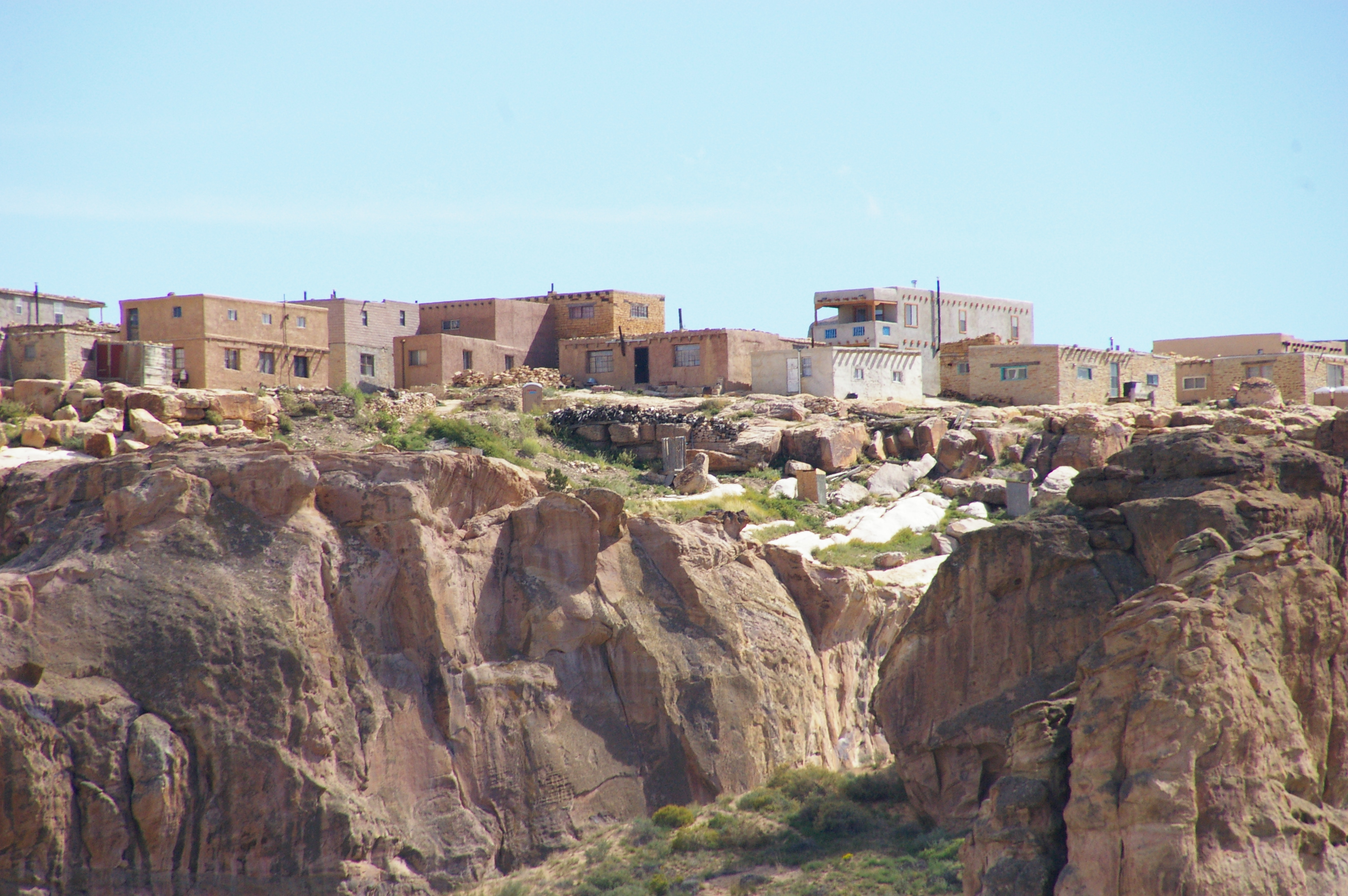
- Dwellings on the mesa at Acoma Pueblo

- Location within New Mexico Location within the United States
- Nearest city: Casa Blanca, New Mexico
- Coordinates: 34°53′47″N 107°34′55″W
- Area: 270 acres (110 ha)
- Architectural style: Pueblo, Territorial
- NRHP reference No.: 66000500

Significant dates
- Added to NRHP: October 15, 1966
- Designated NHLD: October 9, 1960

Acoma Pueblo (/ˈækəmə/ AK-ə-mə, Western Keres: Áakʼu) is a Keres Indigenous American pueblo approximately 60 miles (97 km) west of Albuquerque, New Mexico, in the United States.

Four communities make up the village of Acoma Pueblo: Sky City (Old Acoma), Acomita, Anzac, and McCartys. These communities are located near the expansive Albuquerque metropolitan area, which includes several large cities and towns, including neighboring Laguna Pueblo. The Acoma Pueblo tribe is a federally recognized tribal entity, whose historic land of Acoma Pueblo totaled roughly 5,000,000 acres (2,000,000 ha). Today, much of the Acoma community is primarily within the Acoma Indian Reservation. Acoma Pueblo is a National Historic Landmark.

According to the 2010 United States Census, 4,989 people identified as Acoma. The Acoma have continuously occupied the area where Acoma Pueblo is situated for over 2,000 years. Acoma Pueblo is one of the oldest continuously inhabited communities in the United States.

== Names ==
The English name Acoma was borrowed from Spanish Ácoma (1583) or Acóma (1598). The Spanish name was borrowed from the Acoma word ʼáak’u̓u̓m̓é meaning 'person from Acoma Pueblo'. ʼáak’u̓u̓m̓é itself is derived from ʼáak’u (singular; plural: ʼaak’u̓u̓m̓e̓e̓tra). The name does not have any meaning in the modern Acoma language. Some tribal authorities connect it to the similar word háak’u, 'preparedness, place of preparedness', and suggest that this might be the origin of the name. The name does not mean 'sky city'. Other tribal elders assert that it means 'place that always was', while outsiders say it means 'people of the white rock'.

Acoma has been spelled in various other ways in historical documents, including ákuma, ákomage, Acus, Acux, Aacus, Hacús, Vacus, Vsacus, Yacco, Acco, Acuca, Acogiya, Acuco, Coco, Suco, Akome, Acuo, Ako, and A’ku-me. The Spanish mission name was San Esteban de Acoma.

Pueblo is the Spanish word for 'village' or 'small town' and 'people'. In general usage, it is applied both to the people and to the unique architecture of the southwestern native tribes.

The Acoma are called ʼáak’u ([ʔɑ́ːk'ù] in Western Keresan, Hakukya in Zuni, and Haak’oh in Navajo.

== Language ==
The Acoma language is classified in the western division of the Keresan languages. In contemporary Acoma Pueblo culture, most people speak both Acoma and English, elders speak an endangered indigenous variant of New Mexican Spanish.

== History ==
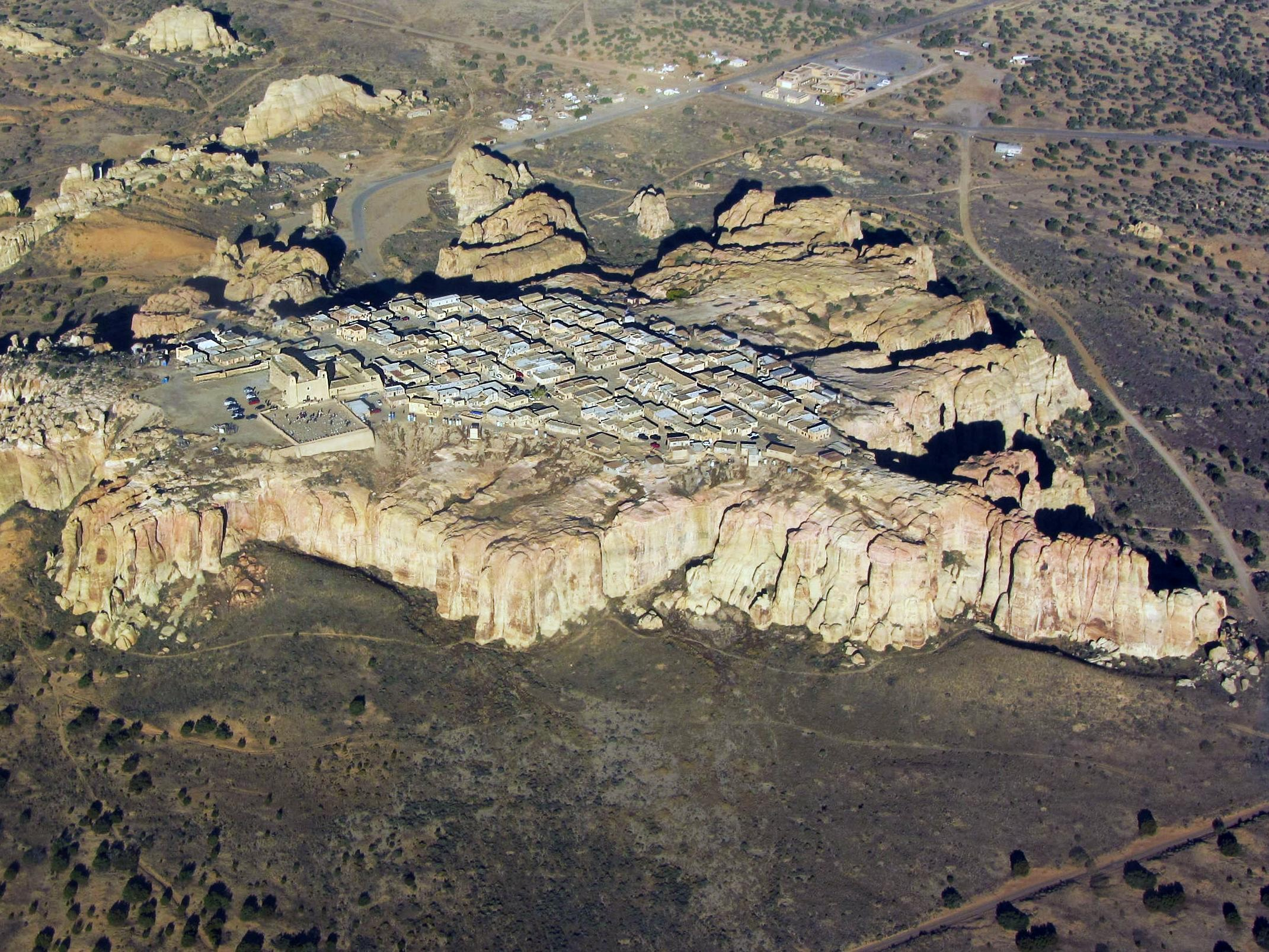
Acoma Pueblo Sky City aerial view

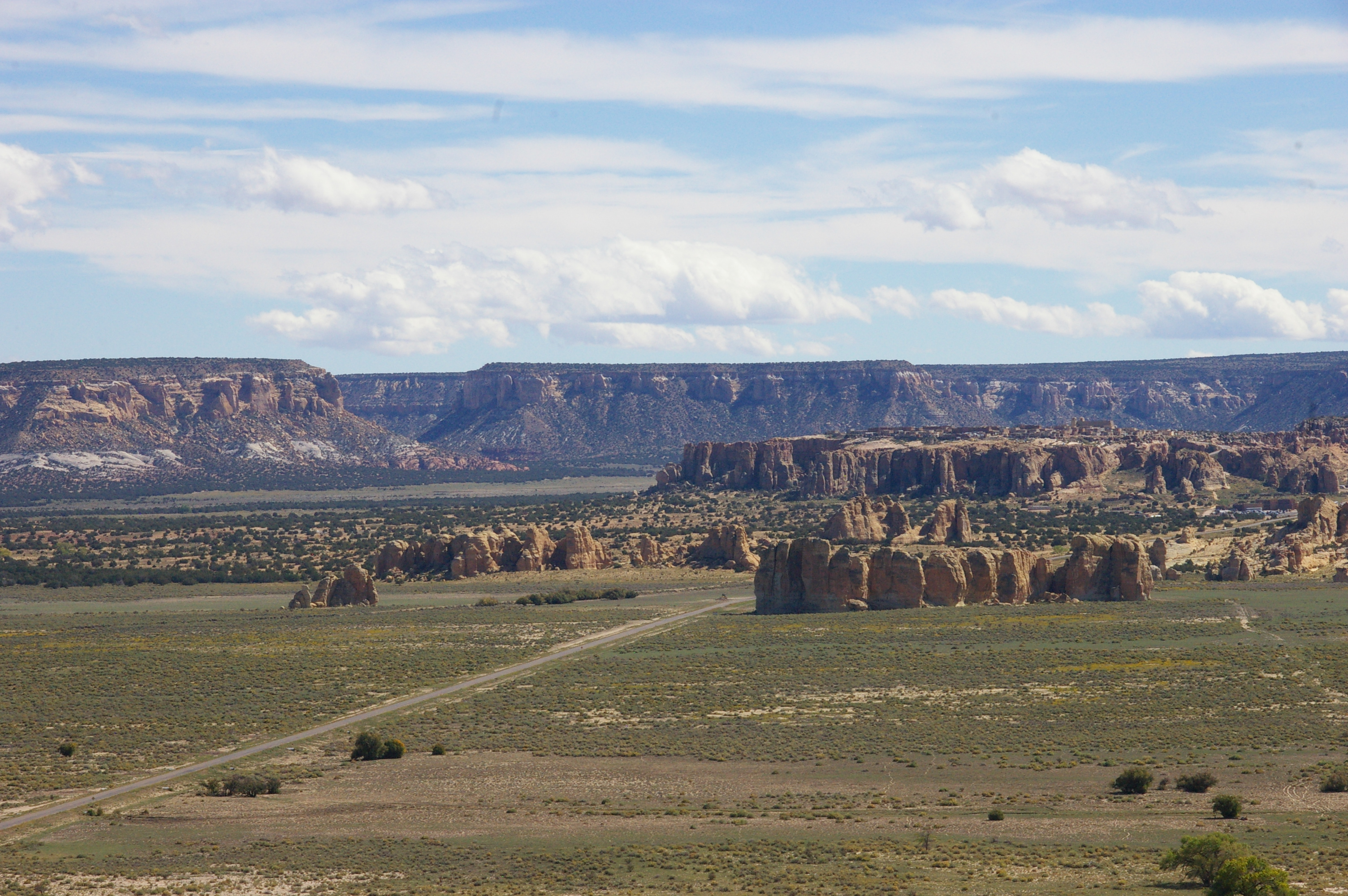
A view of the Acoma Pueblo mesa from the northwest

=== Origins and precontact history ===
Pueblo people descend from Ancestral Puebloans, Mogollon, and other precontact peoples. These influences are seen in the architecture, farming style, and artistry of the Acoma. In the 13th century, the Ancestral Puebloans abandoned their canyon homelands due to climate change and social upheaval. For more than two centuries, there were migrations in the area. The Acoma Pueblo emerged by the 13th century. However, the Acoma themselves say the Sky City Pueblo was established in the 11th century, with brick buildings as early as 1144 on the mesa. Evidence for their antiquity is the unique lack of adobe in their construction. Acoma Pueblo is one of the earliest continuously inhabited communities in the United States.

The Pueblo is situated on a 365-foot (111 m) mesa, about 60 miles (97 km) west of Albuquerque, New Mexico. The isolation and location of the Pueblo has sheltered the community for more than 1,200 years as they sought protection from the raids of the neighboring Navajo and Apache peoples.

=== European contact ===
The first mention of Acoma was in 1539. Estevanico, a slave and the first person of African descent to explore North America, was the first non-Indian to visit Acoma and reported it to Marcos de Niza, who related the information to the viceroy of New Spain after the end of his expedition. Acoma was called the independent Kingdom of Hacus. He called the Acoma people encaconados, which meant that they had turquoise hanging from their ears and noses.

Lieutenant Hernando de Alvarado of conquistador Francisco Vázquez de Coronado's expedition described the Pueblo (which they called Acuco) in 1540 as "a very strange place built upon solid rock" and "one of the strongest places we have seen." Upon visiting the Pueblo, the expedition "repented having gone up to the place." Further from Alvarado's report:

These people were robbers, feared by the whole country round about. The village was very strong, because it was up on a rock out of reach, having steep sides in every direction... There was only one entrance by a stairway built by hand... There was a broad stairway of about 200 steps, then a stretch of about 100 narrower steps and at the top they had to go up about three times as high as a man by means of holes in the rock, in which they put the points of their feet, holding on at the same time by their hands. There was a wall of large and small stones at the top, which they could roll down without showing themselves, so that no army could possibly be strong enough to capture the village. On the top they had room to sow and store a large amount of corn, and cisterns to collect snow and water.

It is believed Coronado's expedition were the first Europeans to encounter the Acoma (Estevan was a native Moroccan). Alvarado reported that first the Acoma refused entry even after persuasions, but after Alvarado showed threats of an attack, the Acoma guards welcomed the Spaniards peacefully, noting that they and their horses were tired. The encounter shows that the Acoma had clothing made of deerskin, buffalo hide, and woven cotton, as well as turquoise jewelry, domestic turkeys, bread, pine nuts, and maize. The village seemed to contain about 200 men.

Acoma woman

Acoma was next visited by the Spanish 40 years later in 1581 by Fray Agustín Rodríguez and Francisco Sánchez Chamuscado, with 12 soldiers, 3 other friars, and 13 others, including Indian servants. The Acoma at this time were reported to be somewhat defensive and fearful. This response may have been due to the knowledge of the Spanish enslavement of other Indians to work in silver mines in the area. However, eventually the Rodríguez and Chamuscado party convinced them to trade goods for food. The Spaniard reports say the pueblo had about 500 houses of either three or four stories high.

In 1582, Acoma was visited again by Antonio de Espejo for three months. The Acoma were reported to be wearing mantas. Espejo also noted irrigation in Acomita, the farming village in the north valley near San Jose River, which was two leagues from the mesa. He saw evidence of intertribal trade with "mountain Querechos". Acoma oral history does not confirm this trade but only tells of common messengers to and from the mesa and Acomita, McCartys Village, and Seama.

Juan de Oñate intended to colonize New Mexico starting from 1595 (he formally held the area by April 1598). The Acoma warrior Zutacapan heard of this plan and warned the mesa and organized a defense. However, a pueblo elder, Chumpo, dissuaded war, partly to prevent deaths and partly based on Zutancalpo's (Zutacapan's son) mentioning of the widespread belief that the Spaniards were immortal. Thus, when Oñate visited on October 27, 1598, Acoma met him peacefully, with no resistance to Oñate's demand of surrender and obedience reported. Oñate demonstrated his military power by firing a gun salute. Zutacapan offered to meet Oñate formally in the religious kiva, which is traditionally used as the place to make sacred oaths and pledges. However, Oñate was scared of death and in suspicious ignorance of Acoma customs refused to enter via ladder from the roof into the dark kiva chambers. Purguapo was another Acoma man out of four chosen for Spaniard negotiations.

Soon after Oñate's departure, Gaspar Pérez de Villagrá visited Acoma by himself with a dog and a horse and asked for other supplies. Villagrá refused to get off his horse and left to follow Oñate's party. However, Zutacapan convinced him to return to receive supplies. In questioning by Zutacapan, Villagrá said that 103 armed men were two days away from Acoma. Zutacapan then told Villagrá to leave Acoma.

On December 1, 1598, Juan de Zaldívar, Oñate's nephew, reached Acoma with 20–30 men and peacefully traded with them and had to wait some days for their order of ground corn. On December 4, Zaldívar went with 16 armored men to Acoma to find out about the corn. Zutacapan met them and directed them to the homes with the corn. Zaldívar's people then divided into groups to collect the corn. The traditional oral Acoma narrative tells that a group attacked some Acoma women, leading Acoma warriors to retaliate. The Spaniards kidnapped the woman and children, while they lured the men away. They raped and killed off the women. and say that the division of the men was a reaction to Zutacapan's plan to kill Zaldívar's party. The Acoma killed 12 of the Spaniards, including Zaldívar. Five men escaped, although one died from jumping over the citadel, leaving four to escape with the remaining camp.

On December 20, 1598, Oñate learned of Zaldívar's death and, after receiving encouraging advice from the friars, planned an attack in revenge, as well to teach a lesson to other pueblos. Acomas requested help from other tribes to defend against the Spanish. Among the leaders were Gicombo, Popempol, Chumpo, Calpo, Buzcoico, Ezmicaio, and Bempol (a recruited Apache war leader). On January 21, 1599, Vicente de Zaldívar (Juan de Zaldívar's brother) reached Acoma with 70 soldiers. The Acoma Massacre started the next day and lasted for three days. On January 23, men were able to climb the southern mesa unnoticed by Acoma guards and breach the pueblo. The Spanish dragged a cannon through the streets, toppling adobe walls and burning most of the village, killing 800 people (decimating 20% of the 4,000 population) and imprisoning approximately 500 others. Almost all of the remaining inhabitants were enslaved or left the town. The pueblo surrendered at noon on January 24. Zaldívar lost only one of his men. The Spanish amputated the right feet of men over 25 years old, and by some accounts one or more toes of such enslaved men's right feet, and forced them into slavery for 20 years. They also took males aged 12–25 and females over 12 away from their parents, putting most of them in slavery for 20 years. The enslaved Acoma were given to government officials and various missions. Two other Indian men visiting Acoma at the time had their right hands cut off and were sent back to their respective Pueblos as a warning of the consequences for resisting the Spanish. On the north side of the mesa, a row of houses still retains marks from the fire started by a cannon during this Acoma War Oñate was later exiled from New Mexico for mismanagement, false reporting, and cruelty by Philip III of Spain.

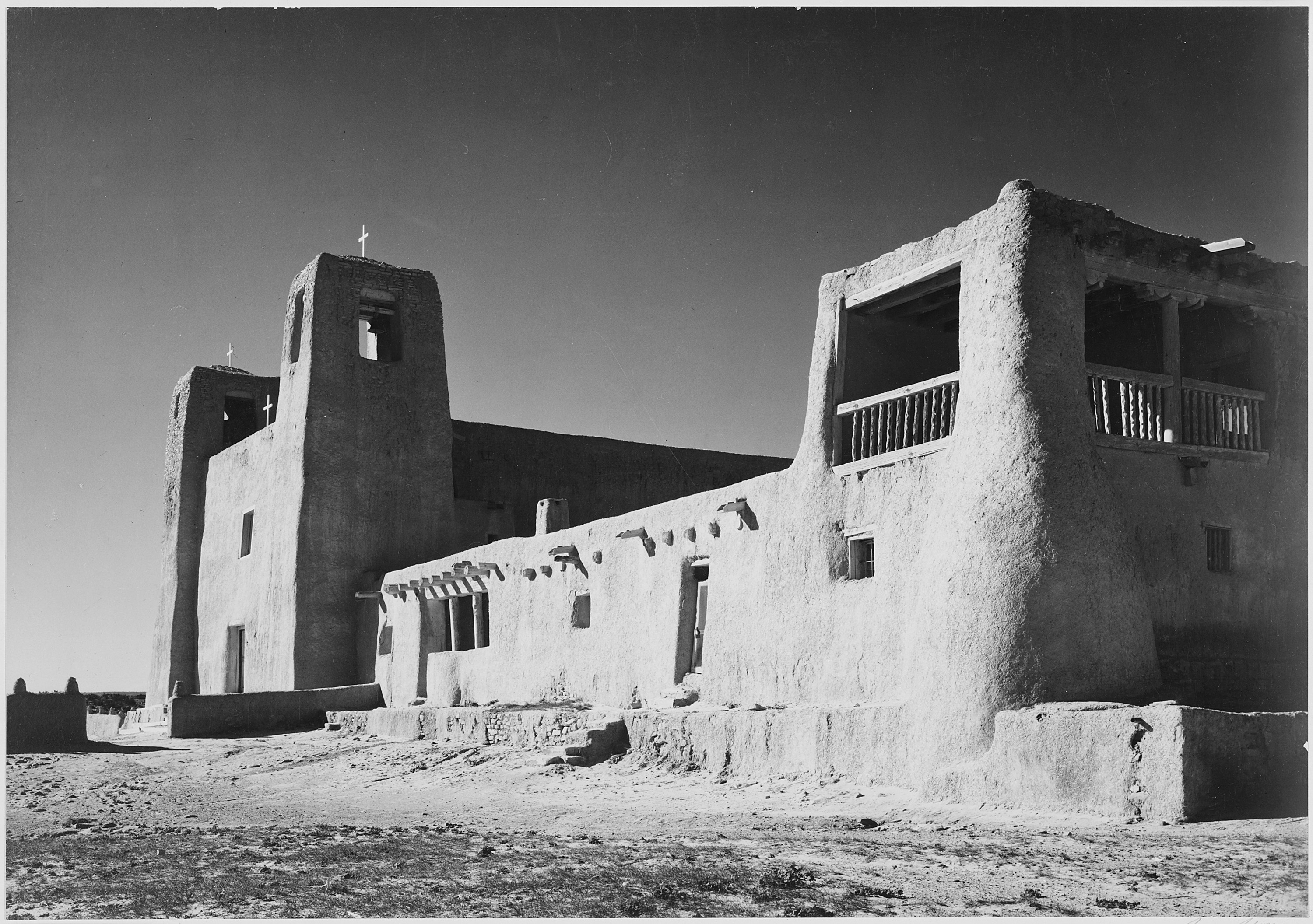
Mission San Esteban Rey was built c.1641, photograph by Ansel Adams, c.1941

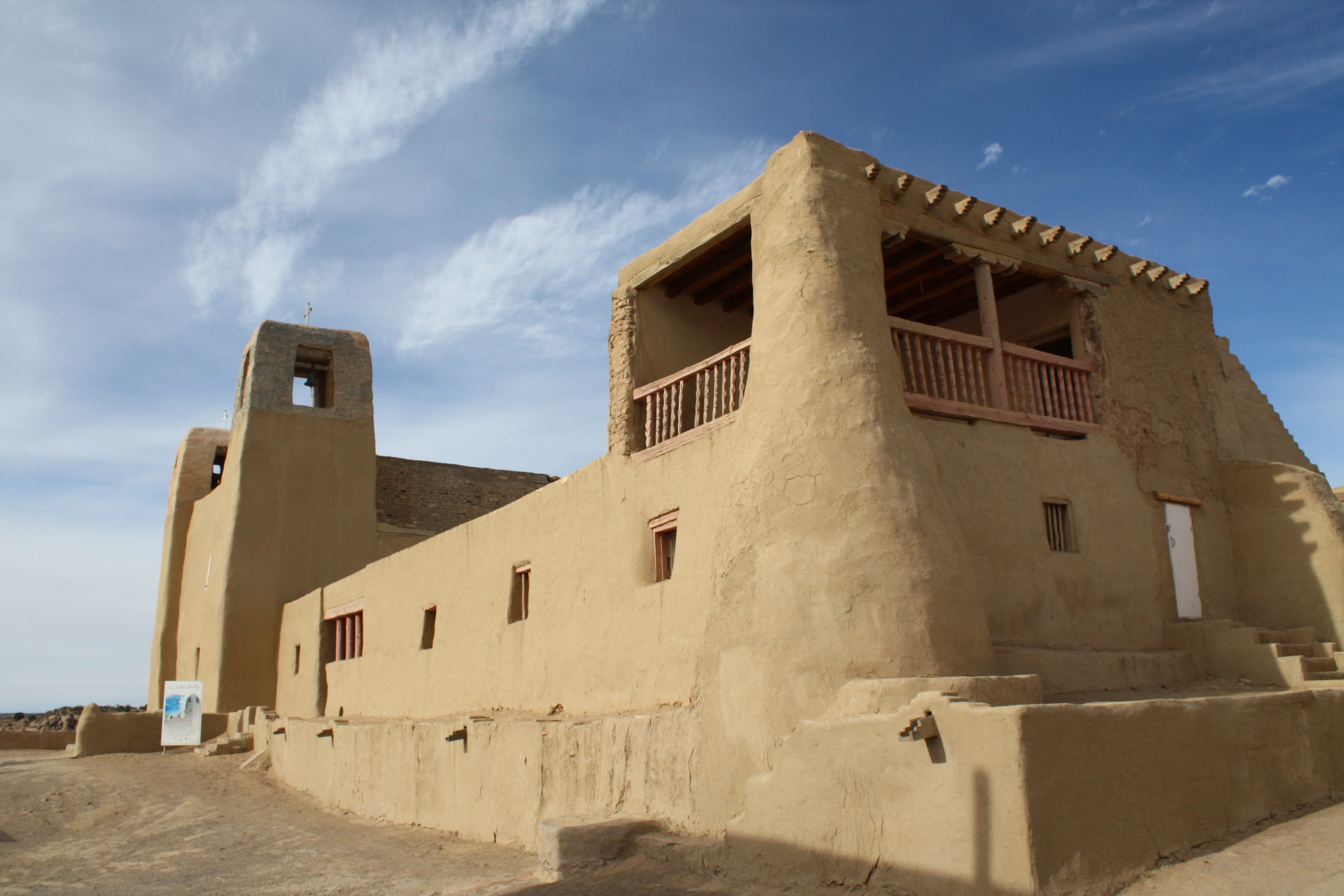
A view from 2009 of the same building, where architectural modifications are apparent

Survivors of the Acoma Massacre rebuilt their community between 1599 and 1620. The town remained uninhabited for several months, out of fear of more attacks, until it began to be rebuilt in December 1599. Oñate forced the Acoma and other local Indians to pay taxes in crops, cotton, and labor. Spanish rule also brought Catholic missionaries into the area. The Spanish renamed the pueblos with the names of saints and started to construct churches in them. They introduced new crops to the Acoma, including peaches, peppers, and wheat. A 1620 royal decree created Spanish civil offices in each pueblo, including Acoma, with an appointed governor to take command. In 1680, the Pueblo Revolt took place, with Acoma participating. The revolt brought refugees from other pueblos. Those who eventually left Acoma moved elsewhere to form Laguna Pueblo.

The Acoma suffered high mortality from smallpox epidemics, as they had no immunity to such Eurasian infectious diseases. They also suffered raiding from the Apache, Comanche, and Ute. On occasion, the Acoma would side with the Spanish to fight against these nomadic tribes. Forced to formally adopt Catholicism, the Acoma proceeded to practice their traditional religion in secrecy, and combined elements of both in a syncretic blend. Intermarriage and interaction became common among the Acoma, other pueblos, and Hispanic villages. These communities would intermingle in a kind of creolization to form the culture of New Mexico.

==== San Esteban Del Rey Mission ====
Between 1629 and 1641 Father Juan Ramirez oversaw construction of the San Estevan Del Rey Mission Church. The Acoma were ordered to build the church, moving 20,000 short tons (18,000 t) of adobe, straw, sandstone, and mud to the mesa for the church walls. Ponderosa pine was brought in by community members from Mount Taylor, over 40 miles (64 km) away. The 6,000 square feet (560 m^{2}) church has an altar flanked by 60 feet (18 m)-high wood pillars. These are hand carved in red and white designs, representing Christian and Indigenous beliefs. The Acoma know their ancestors' hands built this structure, and they consider it a cultural treasure.

In 1970, it was placed on the National Register of Historic Places. In 2007, the mission church was designated a National Trust Historic Site, the only Native American site in that ranking as identified by the National Trust for Historic Preservation, a non-profit organization.

=== 19th and 20th century ===
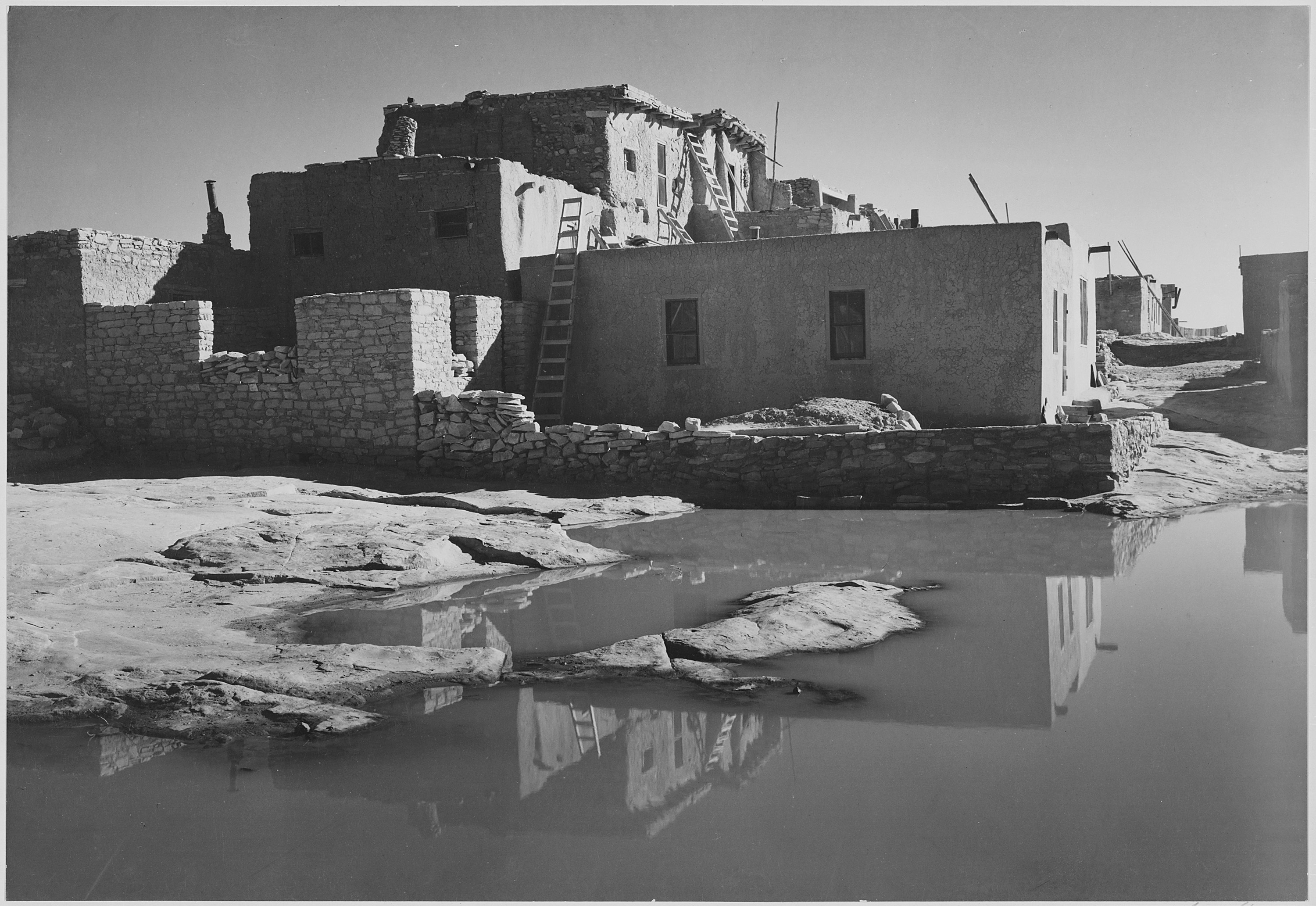
The pueblo 1933–1942 (Ansel Adams)

During the 19th century, the Acoma people, while trying to uphold traditional life, also adopted aspects of the once-rejected Spanish culture and religion. By the 1880s, railroads brought increased numbers of settlers and ended the pueblos' isolation.

In the 1920s, the All Indian Pueblo Council gathered for the first time in more than 300 years. Responding to congressional interest in appropriating Pueblo lands, the U.S. Congress passed the Pueblo Lands Act in 1924. Despite successes in retaining their land, the Acoma had difficulty in preserving their cultural traditions in the 20th century. Protestant missionaries established schools in the area, and the Bureau of Indian Affairs forced Acoma children into boarding schools. By 1922, most children from the community were in boarding schools, where they were forced to use English and practice Christianity. Several generations became cut off from their culture and language, with harsh effects on their families and societies.

=== Present-day ===
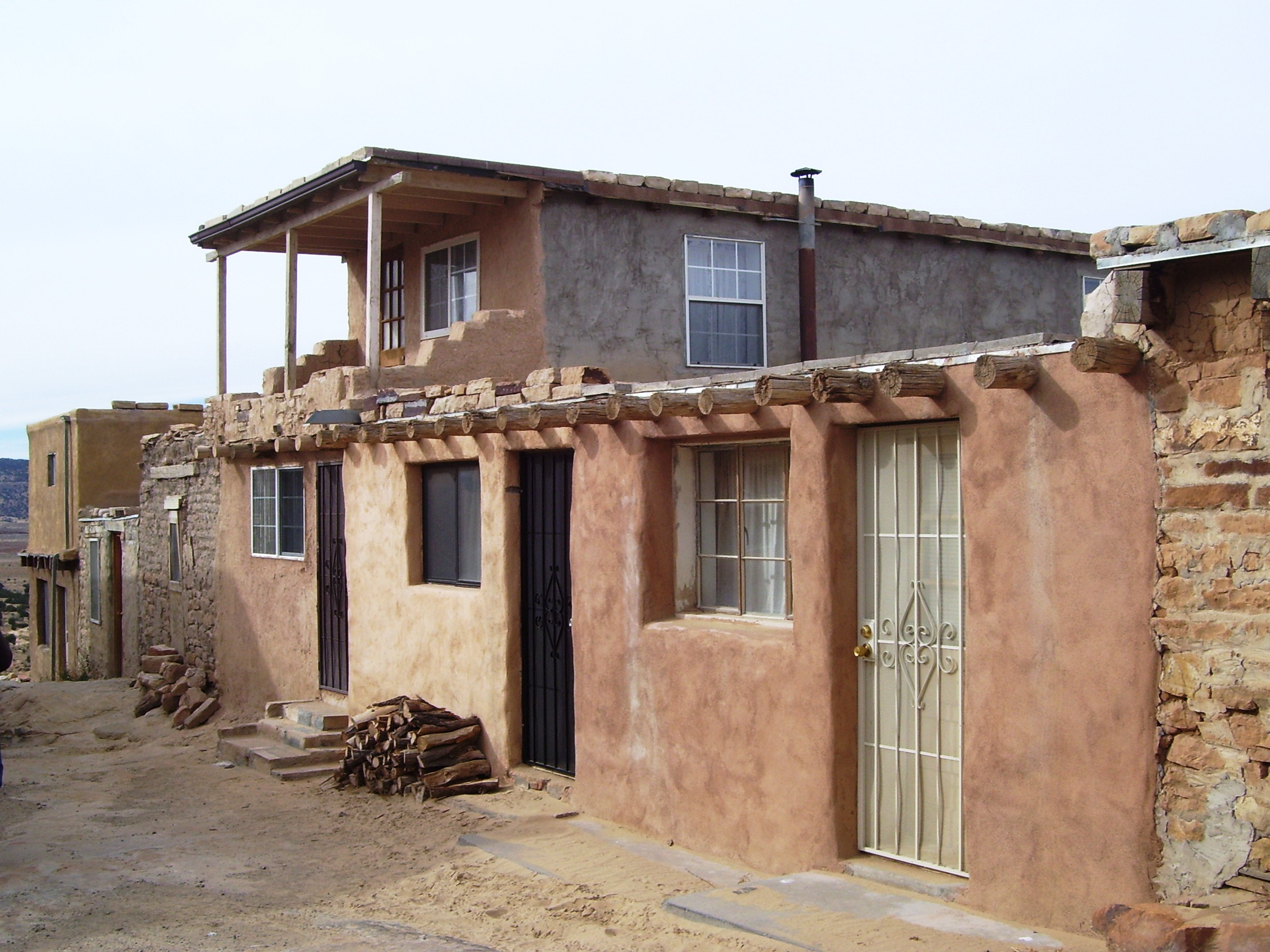
A street in the pueblo, 2012

About 300 two- and three-story adobe buildings stand on the mesa, with exterior ladders used to access the upper levels where residents live. Access to the mesa is by a road blasted into the rock face during the 1950s, navigable by car and bus. Footpaths down the mesa can still be used. Approximately 30 or so people live permanently on the mesa, with the population increasing on the weekends, as family members come to visit, and tourists, some 55,000 annually, visit for the day.

Acoma Pueblo has no electricity, running water, or sewage disposal. Contemporary Acoma culture remains relatively closed. According to the 2000 United States census, 4,989 people identify themselves as Acoma.

== Government ==
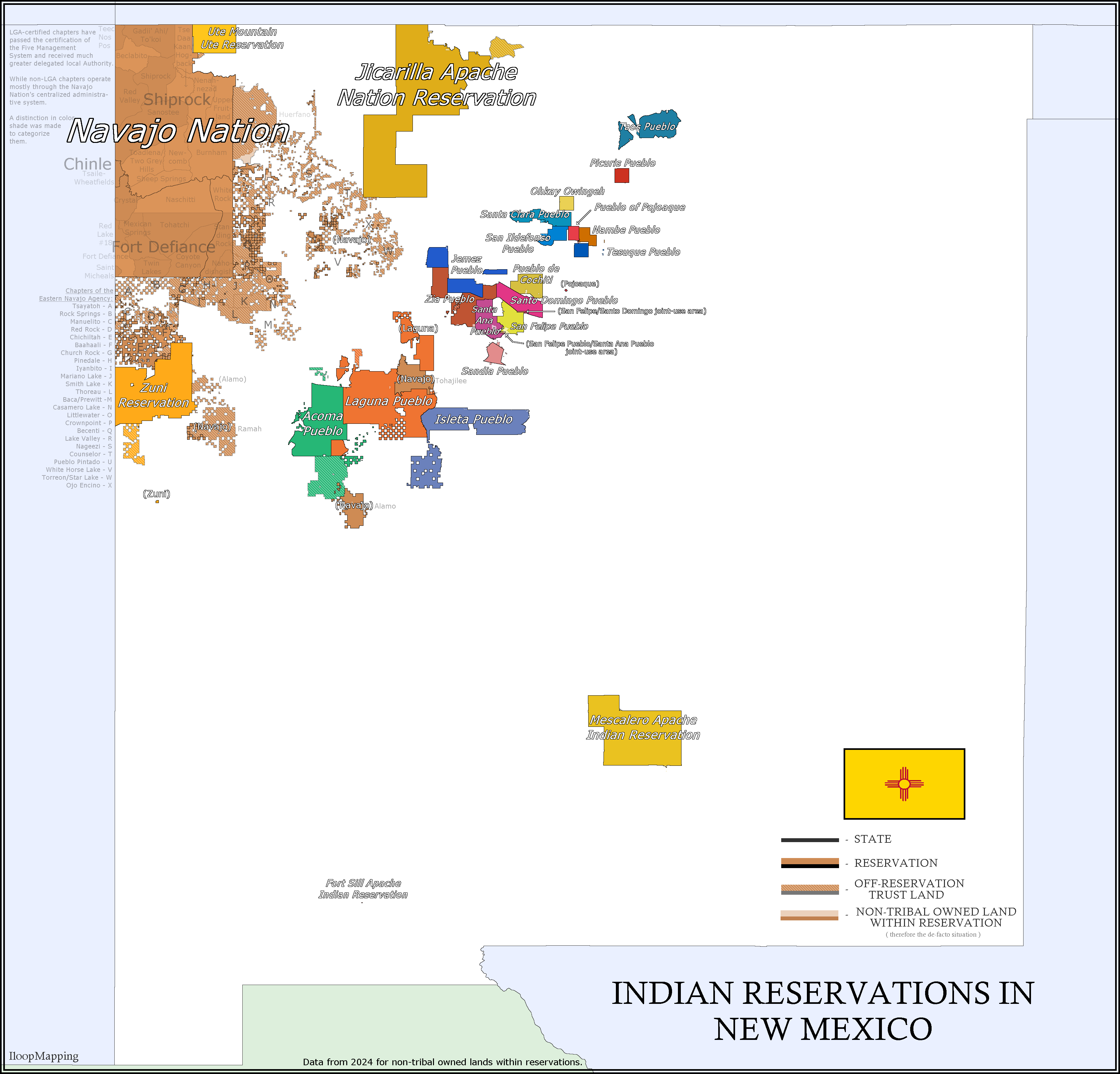
Map of the Acoma and neighboring tribes (In green).

The administration of the Pueblo of Acoma in 2025 is:

- Governor: Charles P. Riley
- First Lieutenant Governor: Loren Aragon
- Second Lieutenant Governor: Ted Ortiz

Historically Acoma was governed by a cacique and war captain, who would serve until their deaths. Both individuals maintained strong religious connections to their work, representing the theocracy of Acoma governance. The Spanish imposed a group to oversee the Pueblo, but their power was not taken seriously by the Acoma. The Spanish group would work with external situations and comprised a governor, two lieutenant governors, and a council. The Acoma also participated in the All Indian Pueblo Council, which started in 1598, arose again in the 20th century, and is active today.

The cacique is still active in the community and is from the Antelope clan. The cacique appoints tribal council members, staff, and the governor.

In 2011, Acoma Pueblo and the Pueblo of Santa Clara were victims of heavy flooding. New Mexico supplied more than $1 million to fund emergency preparedness and damage repair for victims, and Governor Susana Martinez requested additional funding from the Federal Emergency Management Agency.

=== Reservation ===
Pueblo of Acoma Áakʼu (Western Keres)
- Indian Reservation
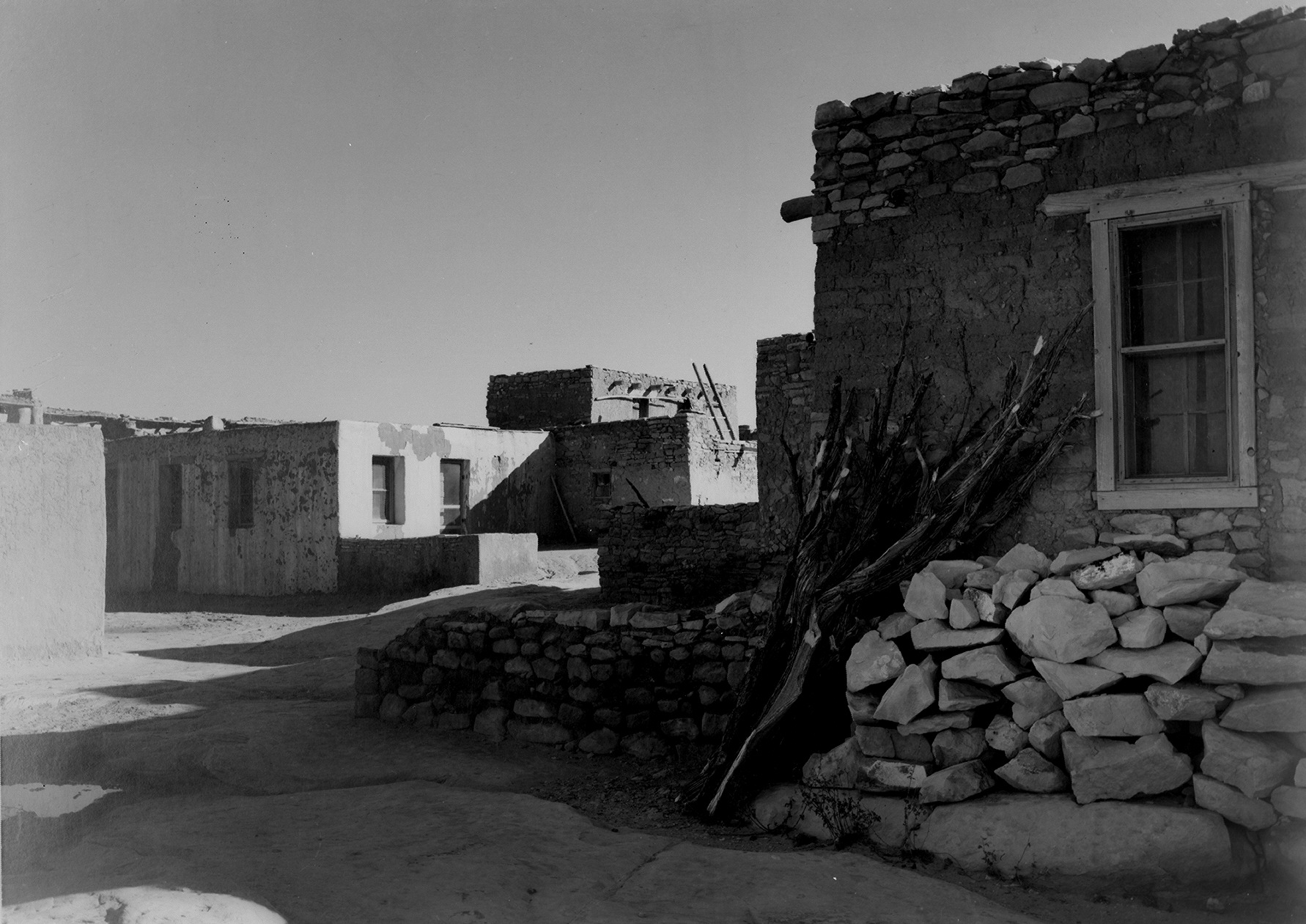
- Houses at Acoma Pueblo, 1941. Photo by Ansel Adams

- Location of Acoma Indian Reservation
- Country: United States
- State: New Mexico
- Postal code: 87034

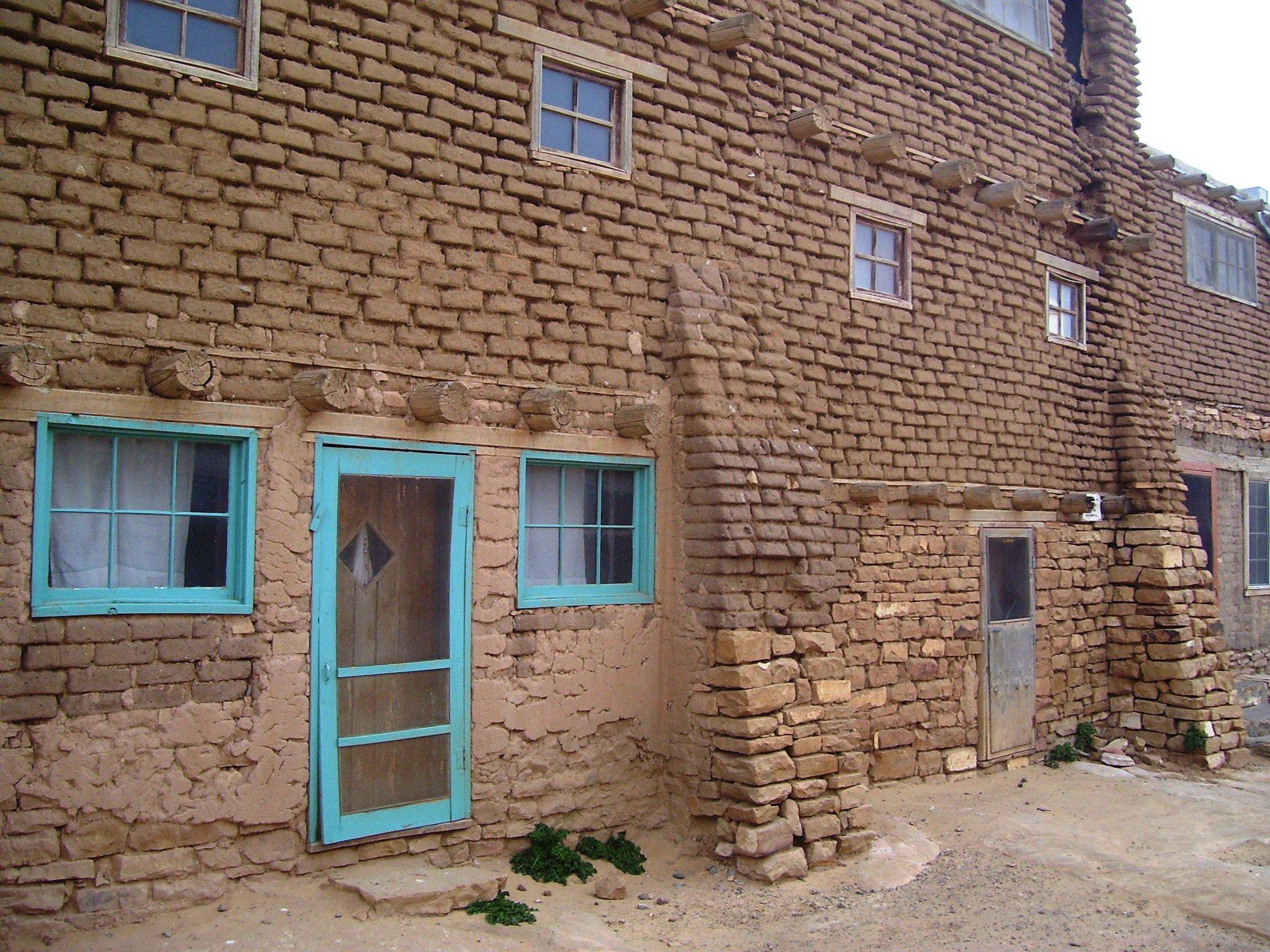
A buttressed three-story building, and a relic of the ancient 11th century brick architecture that still remain in small numbers on the Pueblo

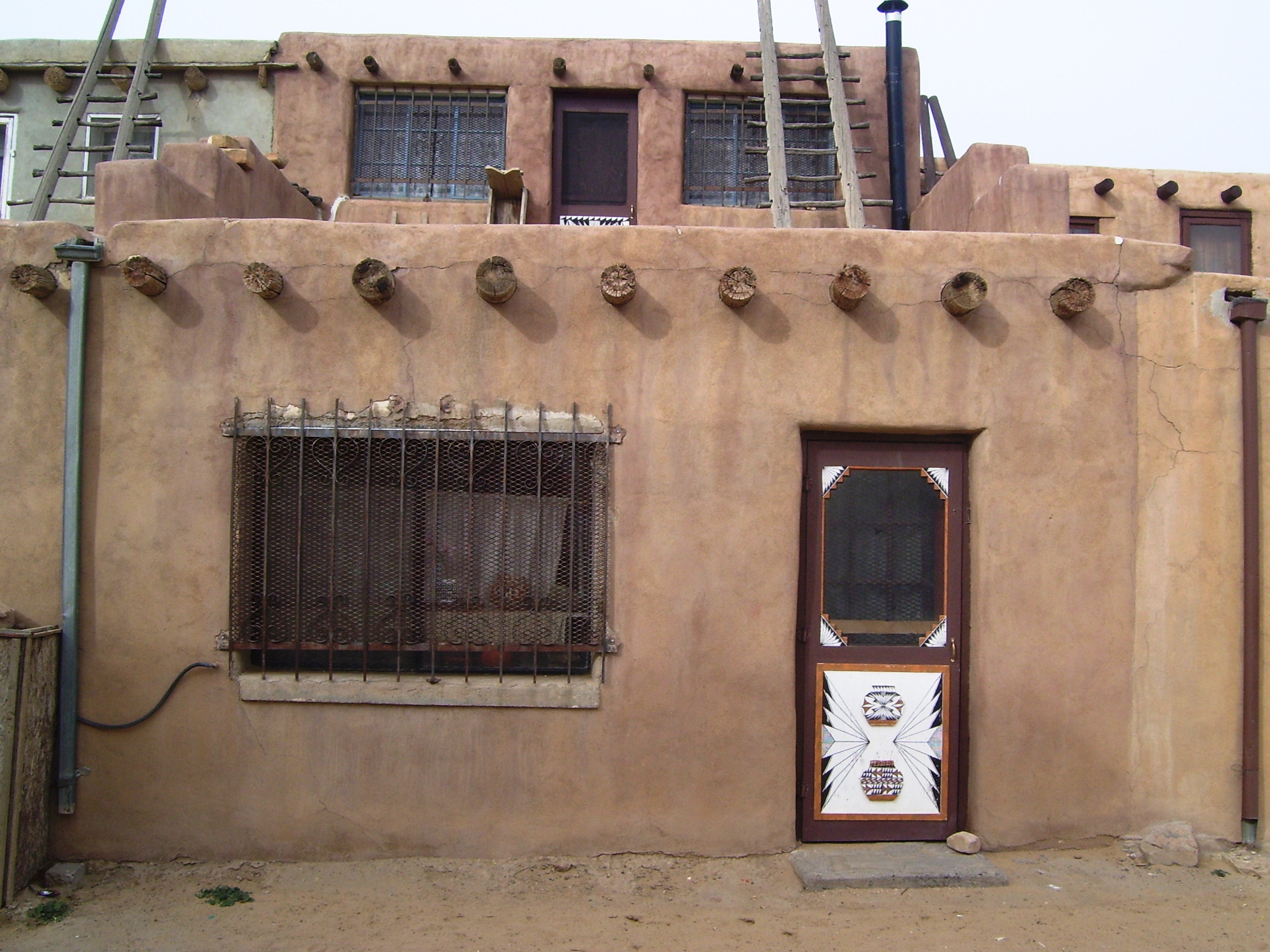
A house with a decorated doorway

The Acoma control their Indian reservation on approximately 500,000 acres (200,000 ha) of their traditional land. Mesas, valleys, hills, and arroyos dot the landscape that averages about 7,000 feet (2,100 m) in altitude, with about 10 inches (250 mm) of rain each year. Since 1977, the Acoma have increased their domain through several land purchases. On the reservation, only tribal citizens may own land and almost all enrolled citizens live on the property.

The Pueblo of Acoma () is an of the Acoma Pueblo peoples located in parts of Cibola, Socorro, and Catron counties, in New Mexico, the Southwestern United States. It covers 594.996 sq mi (1,541.033 km^{2}). The reservation borders the Laguna Indian Reservation to the east and is near El Malpais National Monument due west.

The total number of tribal citizens is about 6,000. According to 2020 census, 3,230 people lived on the reservation. Tribal citizens live both on the reservation and outside it.

Acoma Pueblo (Sky City) is the heart of the reservation and is one of the oldest continuously inhabited places in the United States.

Reservation communities include:

- Acomita
- Anzac
- McCartys
- North Acomita Village
- Sky Line
- Skyline-Ganipa
- Old Sky Line

== Culture ==
=== Architecture ===
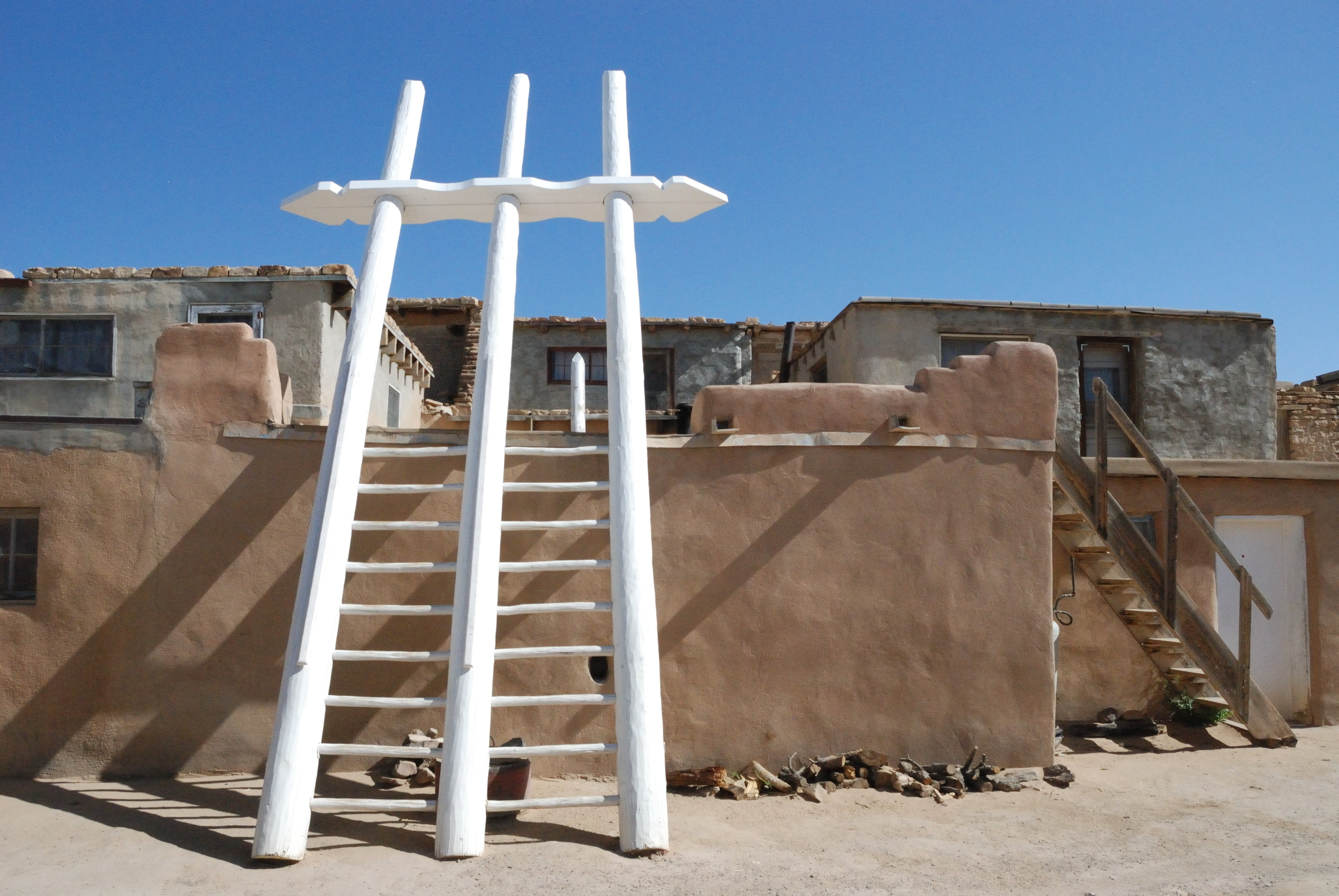
A traditional wooden ladder leads to the second story entrance of a kiva, a religious contemplation chamber

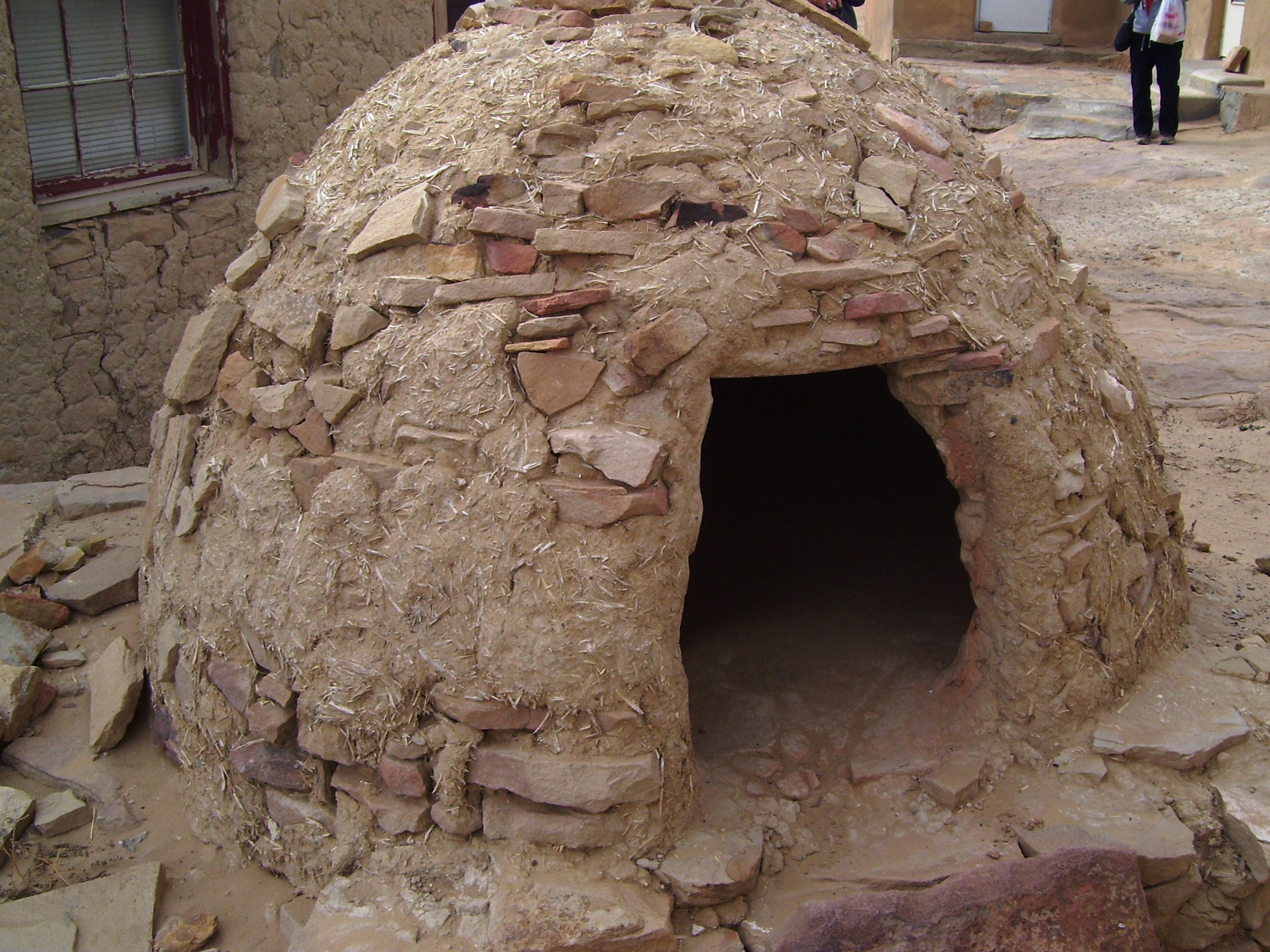
A traditional horno, a mud adobe oven

Acoma Pueblo has three rows of three-story, apartment-style buildings, which face south on top of the mesa. The buildings are constructed from adobe brick, with beams across the roof that were covered with poles, brush, and then plaster. The roof for one level would serve as the floor for another. Each level is connected to others by ladders, serving as a unique defensive aid; the ladders are the only way to enter the buildings, as the traditional design has no windows or doors. The lower levels of the buildings were used for storage. Baking ovens are outside the buildings, with water being collected from two natural cisterns. Acoma also has seven rectangular kivas and a village plaza, which serves as the spiritual center for the village.

=== Family life ===
About 20 matrilineal clans were recognized by the Acoma. Traditional child rearing involved very little discipline. Couples were generally monogamous, and divorce was rare. A quick burial followed death, then four days and nights of vigil. Women wore cotton dresses and sandals or high moccasin boots. Men wore cotton kilts and leather sandals. Rabbit and deer skin was also used for clothing and robes. In the 17th century, horses were introduced to the Pueblo by the Spanish. Education was overseen by kiva headmen, who taught about human behavior, spirit and body, astrology, ethics, child psychology, oratory, history, dance, and music.

Since the 1970s, Acoma Pueblo has retained control over education services, which have been keys in maintaining traditional and contemporary lifestyles. They share a high school with Laguna Pueblo. Alcoholism, drug use, and other health issues are prominent on the reservation and Indian Health Service hospitals and native healers cooperate to battle health problems. Alcohol is banned on the Pueblo. The community is served by the Acoma-Canoncito-Laguna (ACL) Hospital run by the Indian Health Services and located in Acoma. Today, 19 clans still remain active.

=== Religion ===
Traditional Acoma religion stresses harmony between life and nature. The Sun is a representative of the Creator deity. Mountains surrounding the community, the Sun above, and the Earth below help to balance and define the Acoma world. Traditional religious ceremonies may revolve around the weather, including seeking to ensure healthy rainfall. The Acoma also use kachinas in rituals. The Pueblos also had one or more kivas, which served as religious chambers. The leader of each Pueblo would serve as the community religious leader, or cacique. The cacique would observe the Sun and use it as a guide for scheduling ceremonies, some which were kept secret.

Many Acoma are Catholic, but blend aspects of Catholicism and their traditional religion. Many old rituals are still performed. In September, the Acoma honor their patron saint, Saint Stephen. For feast day, the mesa is opened to the public for the celebration. More than 2,000 pilgrims attend the San Esteban Festival. The celebration begins at San Esteban Del Rey Mission, and a carved pine effigy of Saint Stephen is removed from the altar and carried into the main plaza with people chanting, shooting rifles, and ringing steeple bells. The procession then proceeds past the cemetery, down narrow streets, and to the plaza. Upon arriving at the plaza, the effigy is placed in a shrine lined with woven blankets and guarded by two Acoma men. A celebration follows with dancing and feasting. During the festival, vendors sell goods, such as traditional pottery and cuisine.

=== Cuisine ===
Before contact with the Spanish, Acoma people primarily ate corn, beans, and squash. Mut-tze-nee was a popular thin corn bread. They also raised turkeys, tobacco, and sunflowers. The Acoma hunted antelope, deer, and rabbits. Wild seeds, berries, nuts, and other foods were gathered. After 1700, new foods were noted in the historical record. Staples included blue corn drink, pudding, corn mush, corn balls, wheat cake, peach-bark drink, paper bread, flour bread, wild berries, and prickly pear fruit. After contact with the Spanish, goats, horses, sheep and donkeys were raised.

In contemporary Acoma, other foods are also popular, such as apple pastries, corn tamales, green-chili stew with lamb, fresh corn, and wheat pudding with brown sugar.

Irrigation techniques such as dams and terraces were used for agriculture. Farming tools were made of wood and stone. Harvested corn would be ground with hands and mortar.

=== Ethnobotany ===
A list of Acoma Pueblo ethnobotany shows 68 documented plant uses.

In 1932, George R. Swank published a Master's thesis titled "The Ethnobotany of the Acoma and Laguna Indians," containing short sections on the Puebloans' history, culture and mythology as well as an extensive treatment of plant uses and names.

=== Warfare and weaponry ===
Historically, engagements in warfare were common for Acoma, like other Pueblos. Weapons used included war clubs, stones, spears, and darts. The Acoma later would serve as auxiliaries for forces under Spain and Mexico, fighting against raids and protecting merchants on the Santa Fe Trail. After the 19th century, raiding tribes were less of a threat and Acoma military culture began to decline. The war captain position eventually would change to a civil and religious function.

=== Economy ===
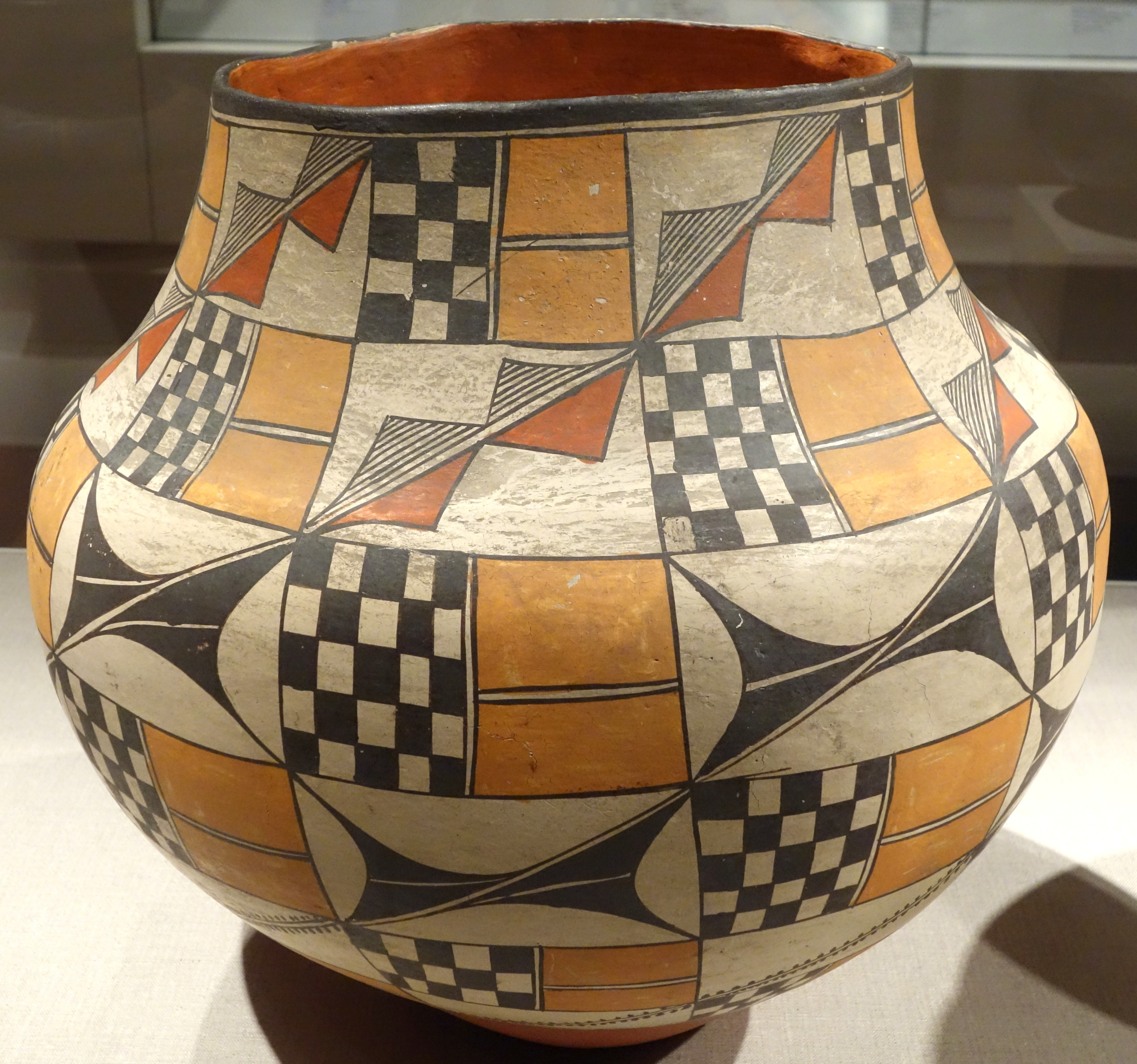
Polychrome olla from Acoma Pueblo, c. 1889–1903, made for the tourist trade.

Historical Acoma economic practices are described as socialistic or communal. Labor was shared and produce was distributed equally. Trading networks were extensive, spreading thousands of miles throughout the region. During fixed times in the summer and fall, trading fairs were held. The largest fair was held in Taos by the Comanche. Nomadic traders would exchange slaves, buckskins, buffalo hide, jerky, and horses. Pueblo people would trade for copper and shell ornaments, macaw feathers, and turquoise. Since 1821, the Acoma traded via the Santa Fe Trail. The arrival of railroads in the 1880s made the Acoma dependent on American-made goods, which suppressed traditional arts such as weaving and pottery.

Today, the Acoma produce a variety of goods. They grow alfalfa, oats, wheat, chilies, corn, melon, squash, vegetables, and fruit, and they raise cattle. They have natural reserves of gas, geothermal, and coal resources. Uranium mines in the area provided work for the Acoma until their closings in the 1980s. After that, the tribe provided most employment. However, high unemployment rates trouble the Pueblo. The uranium mines left radiation pollution, causing the tribal fishing lake to be drained and some health problems within the community.

==== Tourism ====
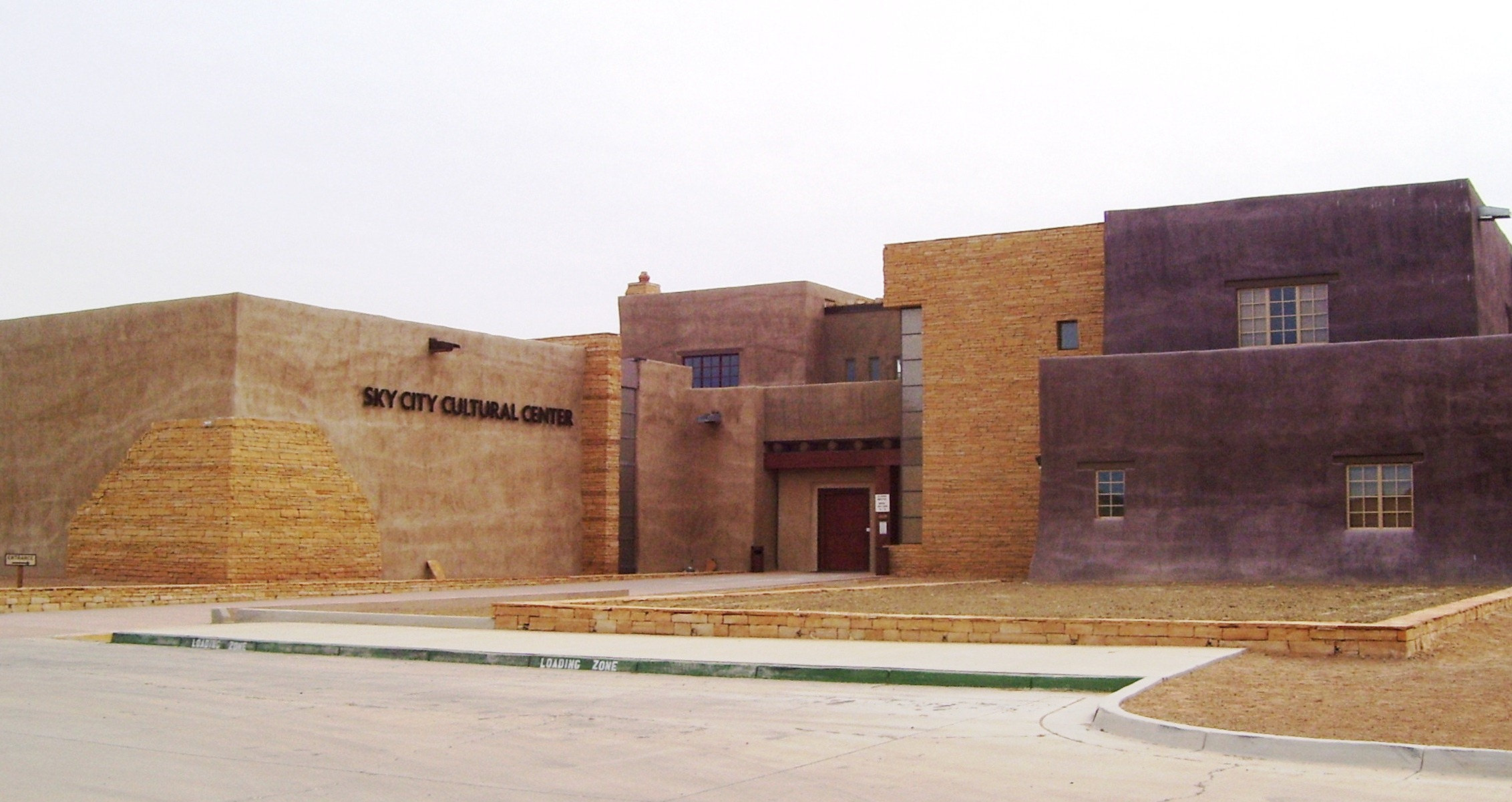
The Sky City Cultural Center, which includes the Haak'u Museum

Tourism is a major source of income for the tribe. In 2008, Pueblo Acoma opened the Sky City Cultural Center and Haak'u Museum at the base of the mesa, replacing the original, which was destroyed by fire in 2000. The center and museum seek to sustain and preserve Acoma culture. Films about Acoma history are shown and a café serves traditional foods. The architecture was inspired by pueblo design and indigenous architectural traditions, with wide doorways in the middle, which in traditional homes make the bringing of supplies easier. The windowpanes contain flecks of mica, a mineral which is used to create mesa windows. The complex is also fire resistant, unlike traditional pueblos, and is painted in light pinks and purples to match the landscape surrounding it. Traditional Acoma artwork is exhibited and demonstrated at the center, including ceramic chimneys crafted on the rooftop. Arts and crafts also bring income.

Acoma Pueblo is open to the public by guided tour from March until October, though June and July have periods of closure for cultural activities. Photography of the Pueblo and surrounding land is restricted. Tours and camera permits are purchased at the Sky City Cultural Center. While photography is allowed with permit, video recordings, drawings, and sketching are prohibited. All photography is forbidden within the church.

The Acoma Pueblo also has a casino and hotel – the Sky City Casino Hotel. The casino and hotel are alcohol-free and are maintained by the Acoma Business Enterprise, which oversees most Acoma businesses.

=== Arts ===
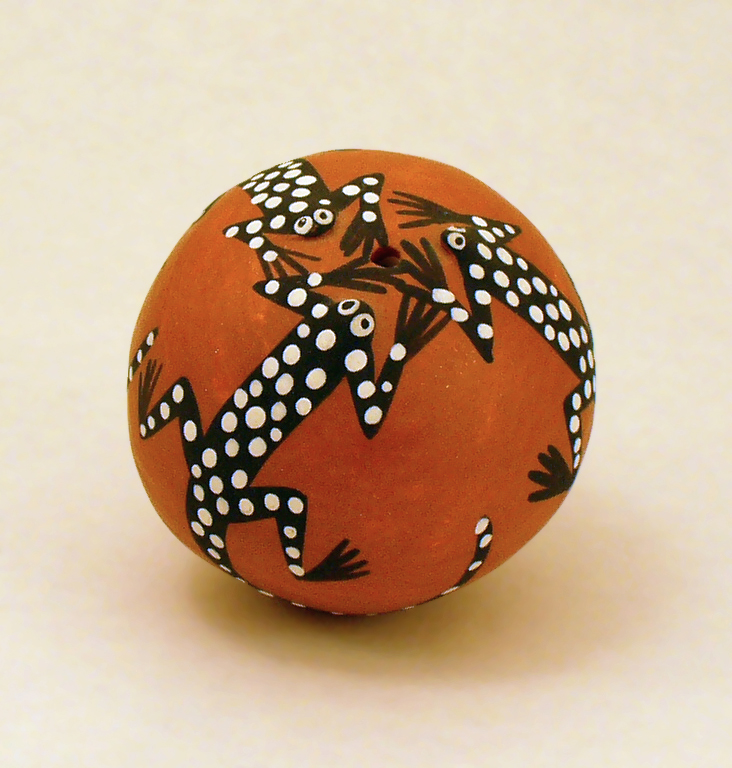
Acoma seed pot by B. Aragon - traditionally, seeds were stored inside this type of pottery and the pots broken as needed

At Acoma, pottery remains one of the most notable artforms. Men create weavings and silver jewelry, as well.

==== Pottery ====
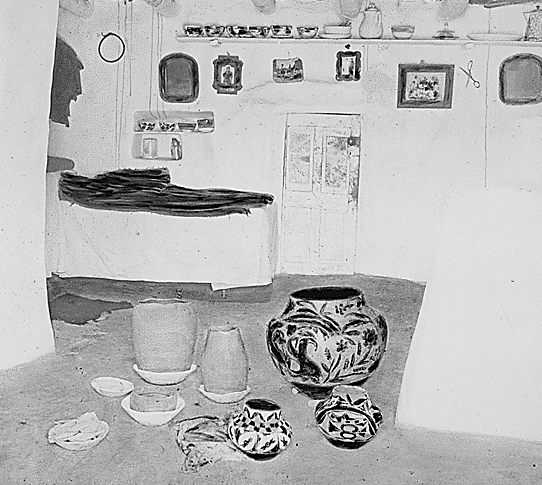
Pottery inside a house, c. 1900

Acoma pottery dates back more than 1,000 years. Dense local clay, dug up at a nearby site, is essential to Acoma pottery. The clay is dried and strengthened by the addition of pulverized pottery shards. The pieces then are shaped, painted, and fired. Geometric patterns, thunderbirds, and rainbows are traditional designs, which are applied with the spike of a yucca. A potter lightly strikes the side of the pot upon completion and holds it to his or her ear; if the pot does not ring, it will crack during firing. If this is found, the piece is destroyed and ground into shards for future use.

== Notable people ==
- Loren Aragon, fashion designer
- Marie Chino, traditional pottery artist
- Vera Chino, traditional pottery artist
- Lucy Lewis, traditional pottery artist
- Georgene Louis, attorney and member of the New Mexico House of Representatives
- Simon J. Ortiz, poet, author, and educator
- Anton Docher, "The Padre of Isleta", French priest
- Rachel Concho, traditional pottery artist known for seed pots

== Gallery ==
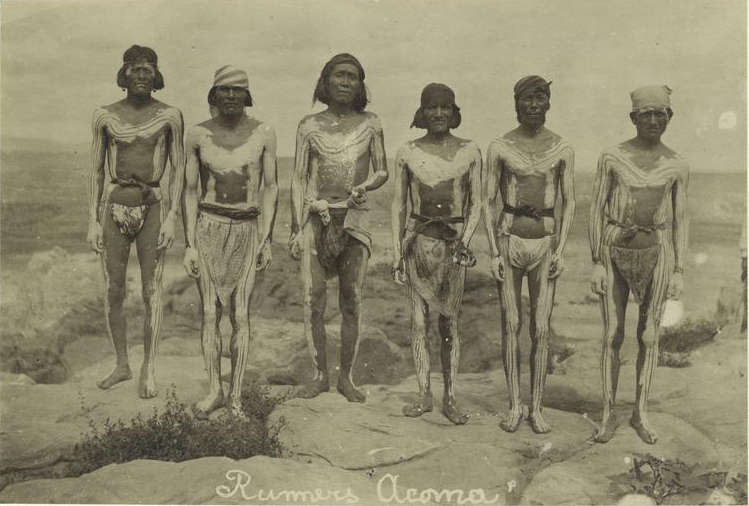
Acoma runners, c. 1909

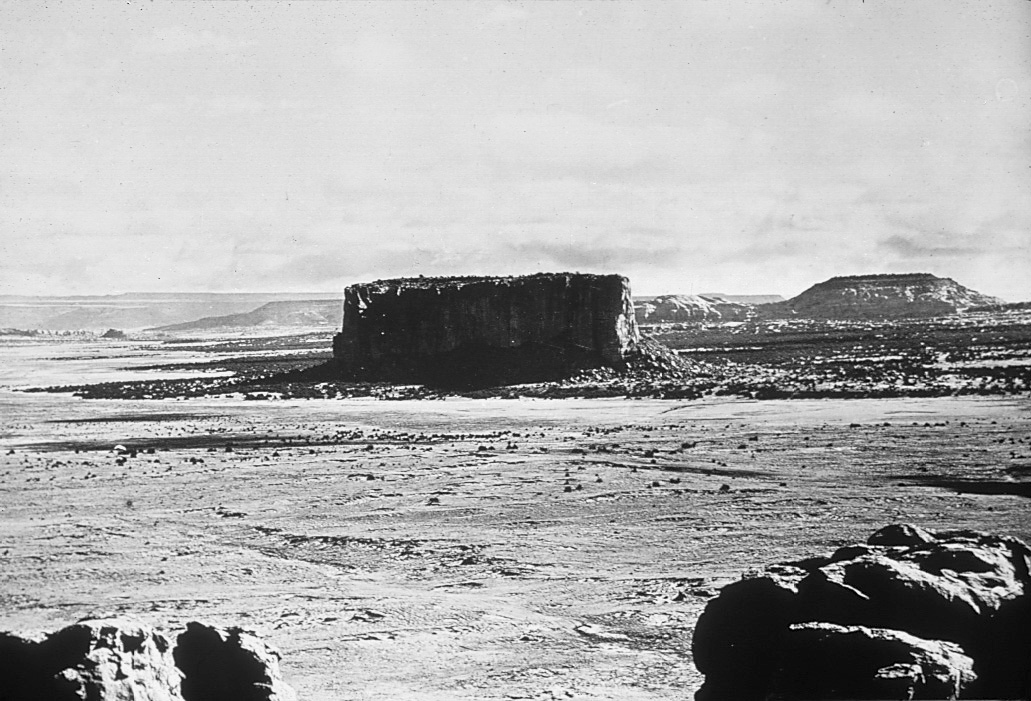
Photograph of Enchanted Mesa taken from Acoma in 1899

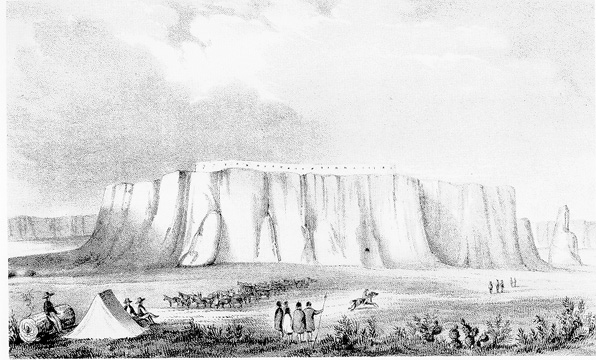
Illustration of the Acoma mesa from 1846

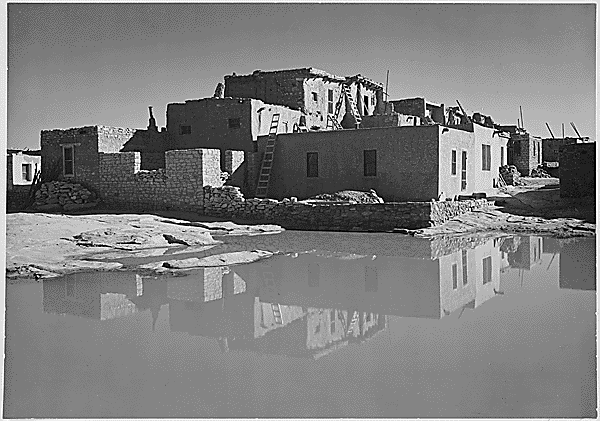
Acoma Pueblo and its reflection in a pool of water

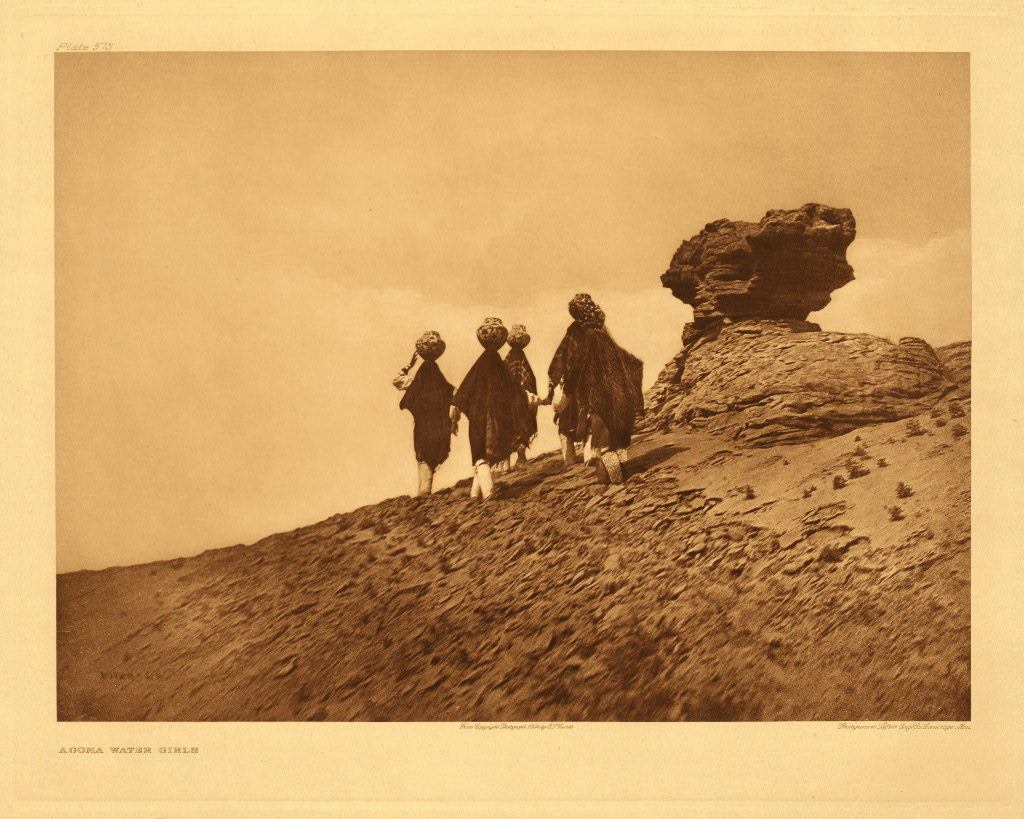
Acoma water girls by Edward S. Curtis

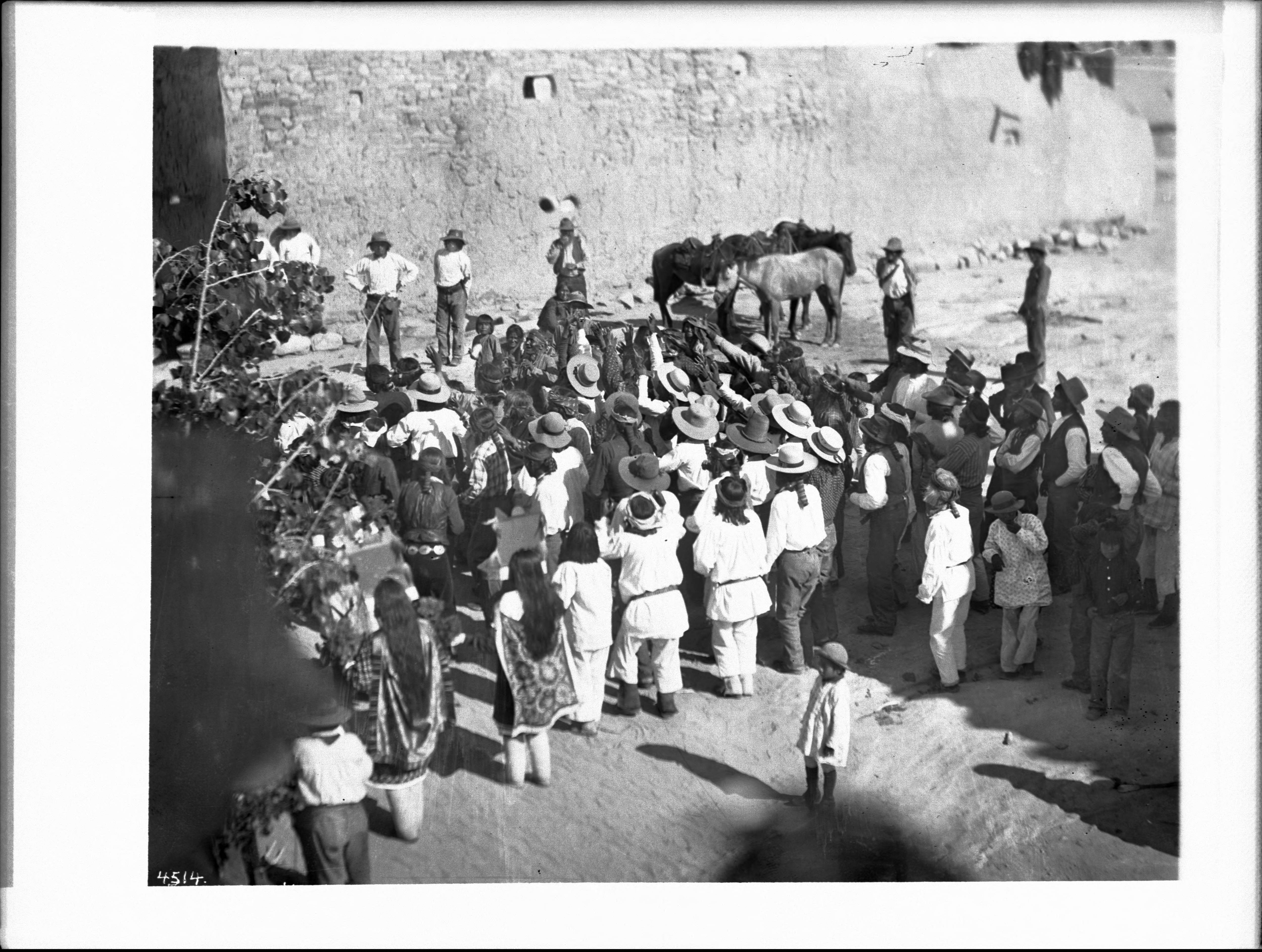
Fiesta de San Esteban, Acoma Pueblo, c. 1900

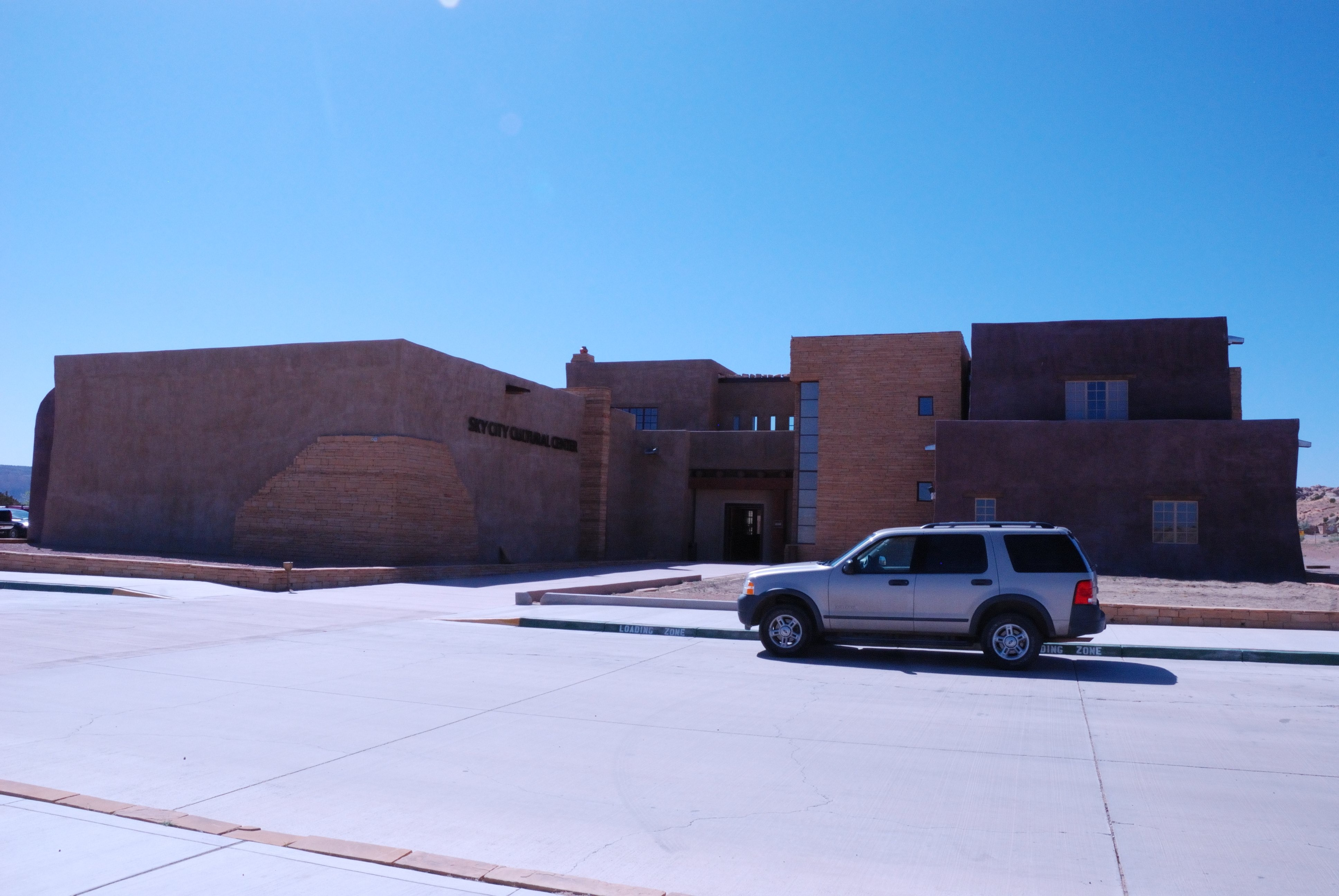
The Sky City Cultural Center

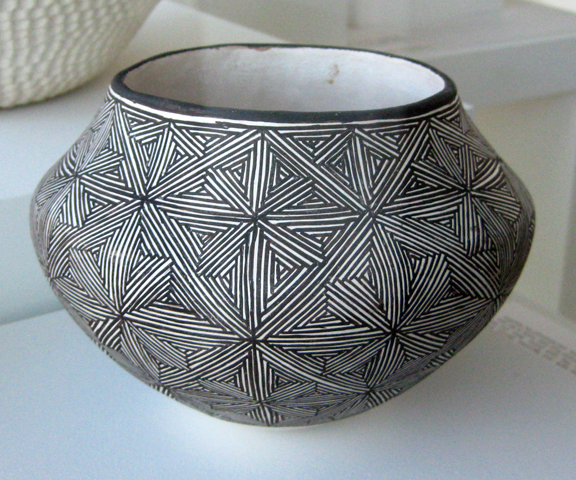
Fineline black-on-white olla by Lucy M. Lewis, c. 1960–1970s, collection of the Fred Jones Jr. Museum of Art

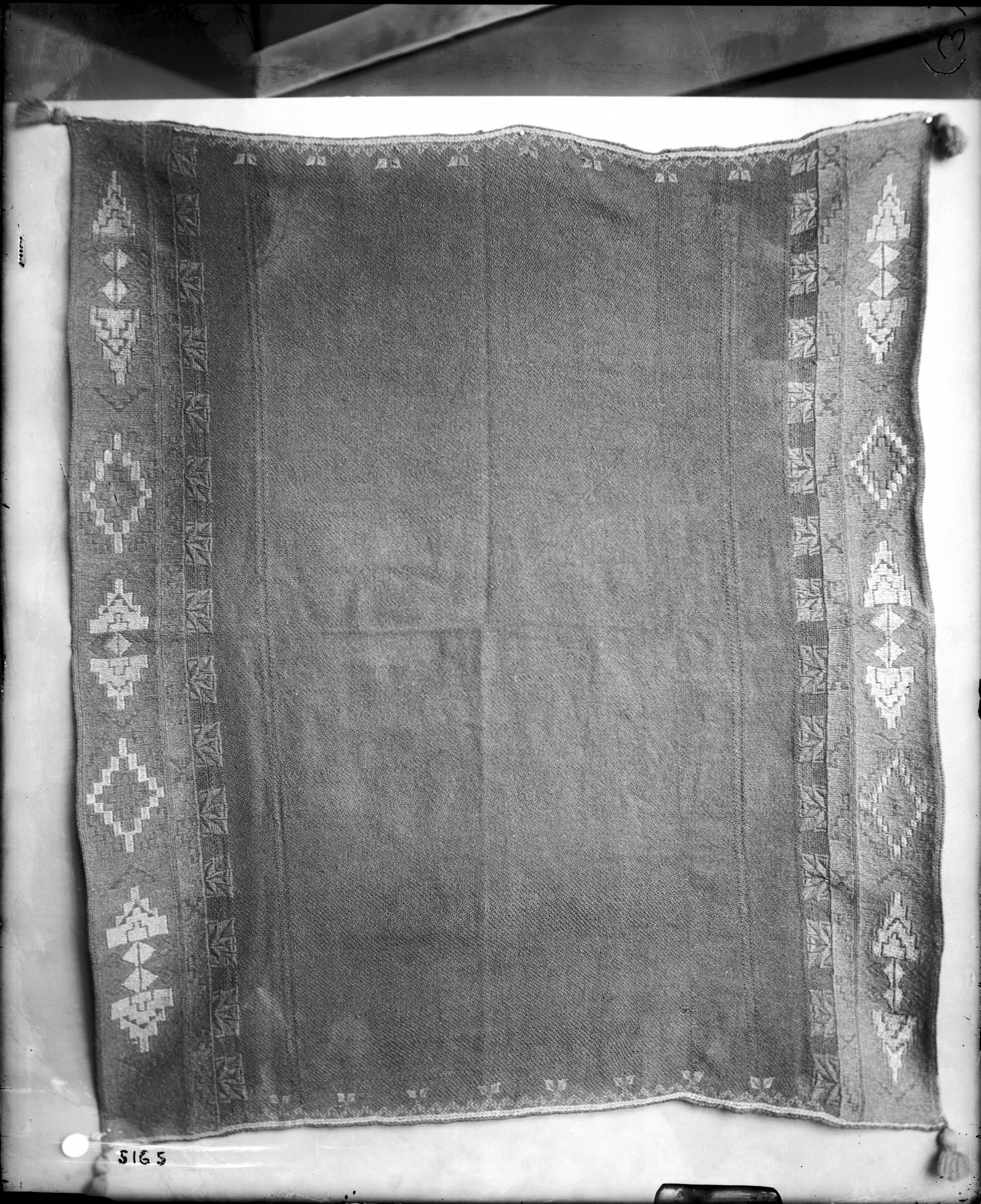
Acoma dress made by men, c. 1898

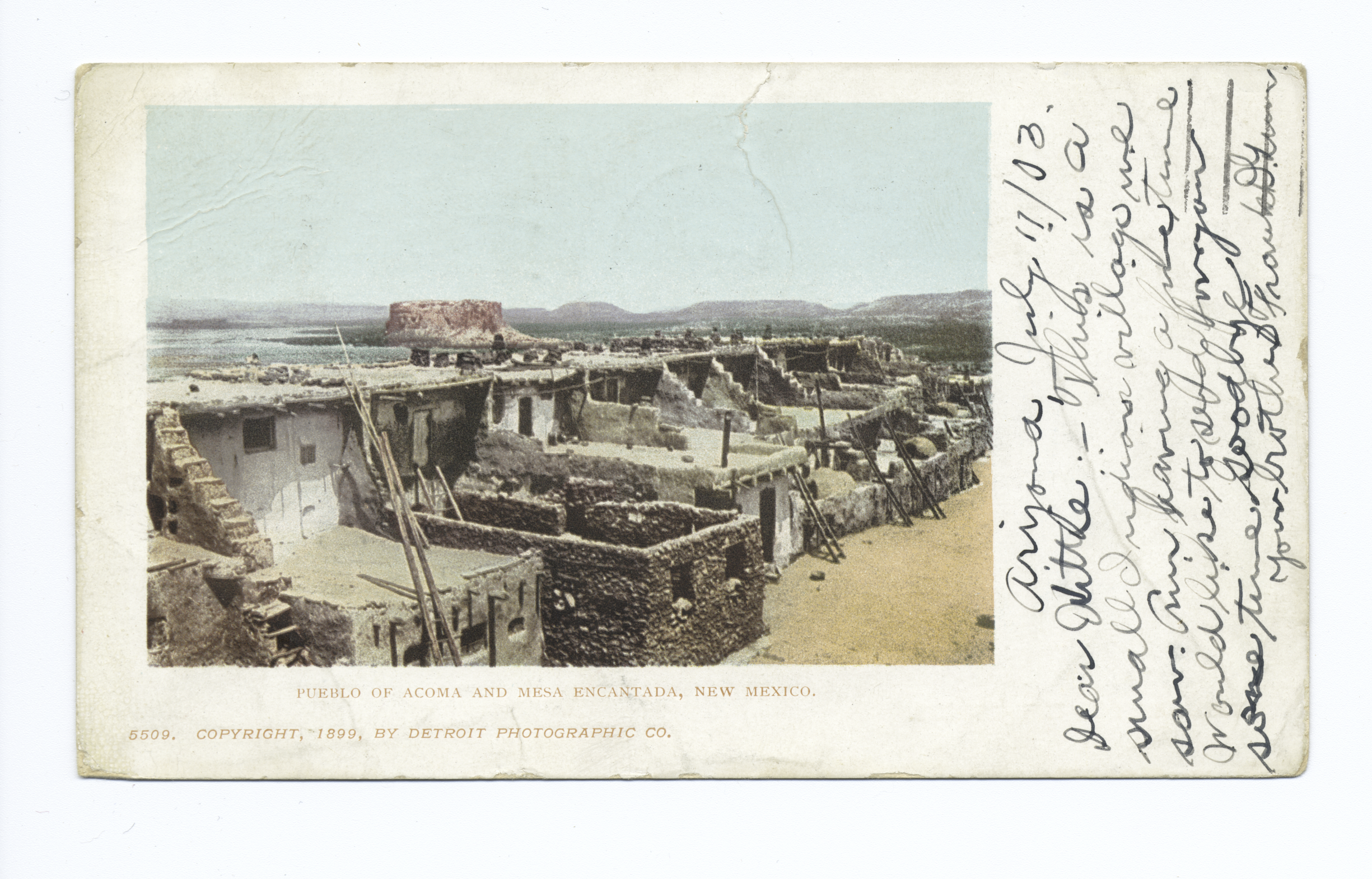
Acoma, Mesa Encantada, 1898

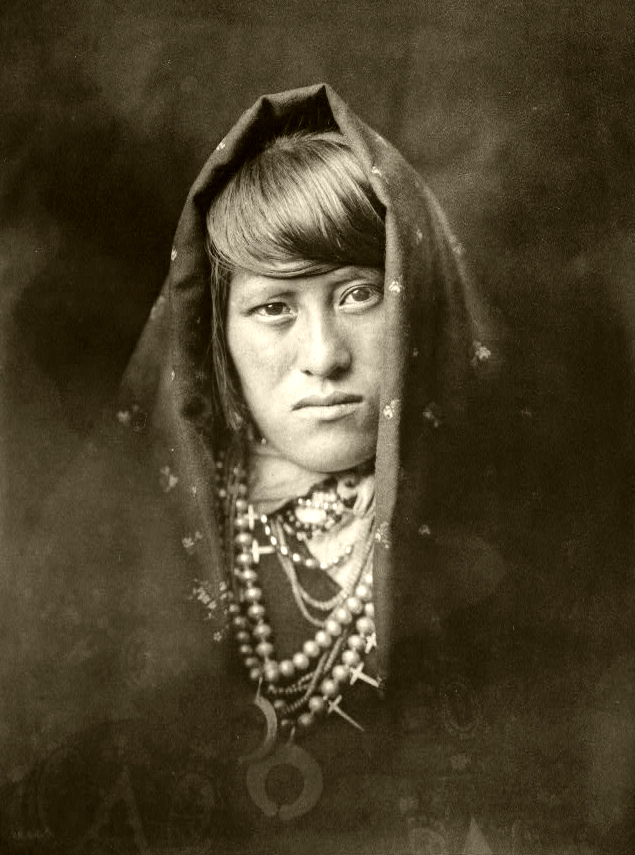
Acoma woman, 1926

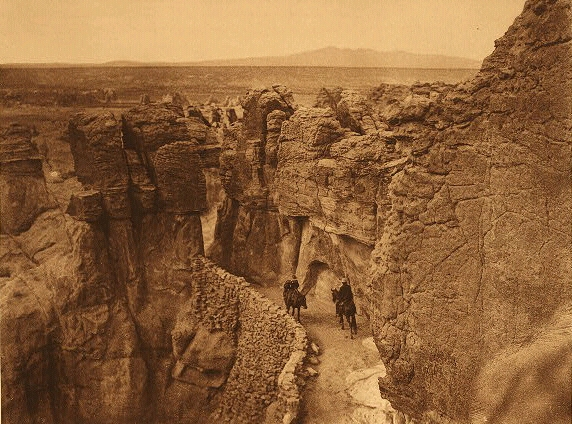
Old trail (entrance) to Acoma Pueblo, 1904

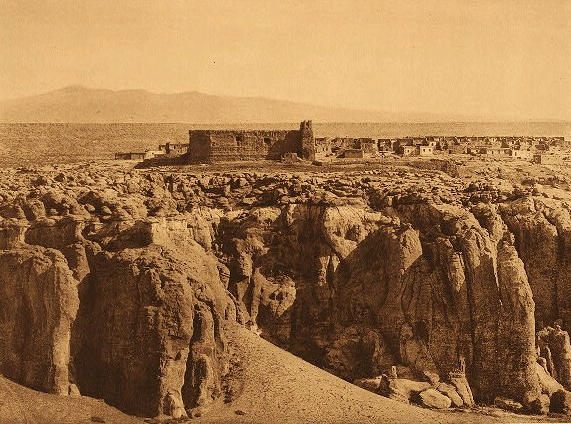
View of Acoma from the south, 1904

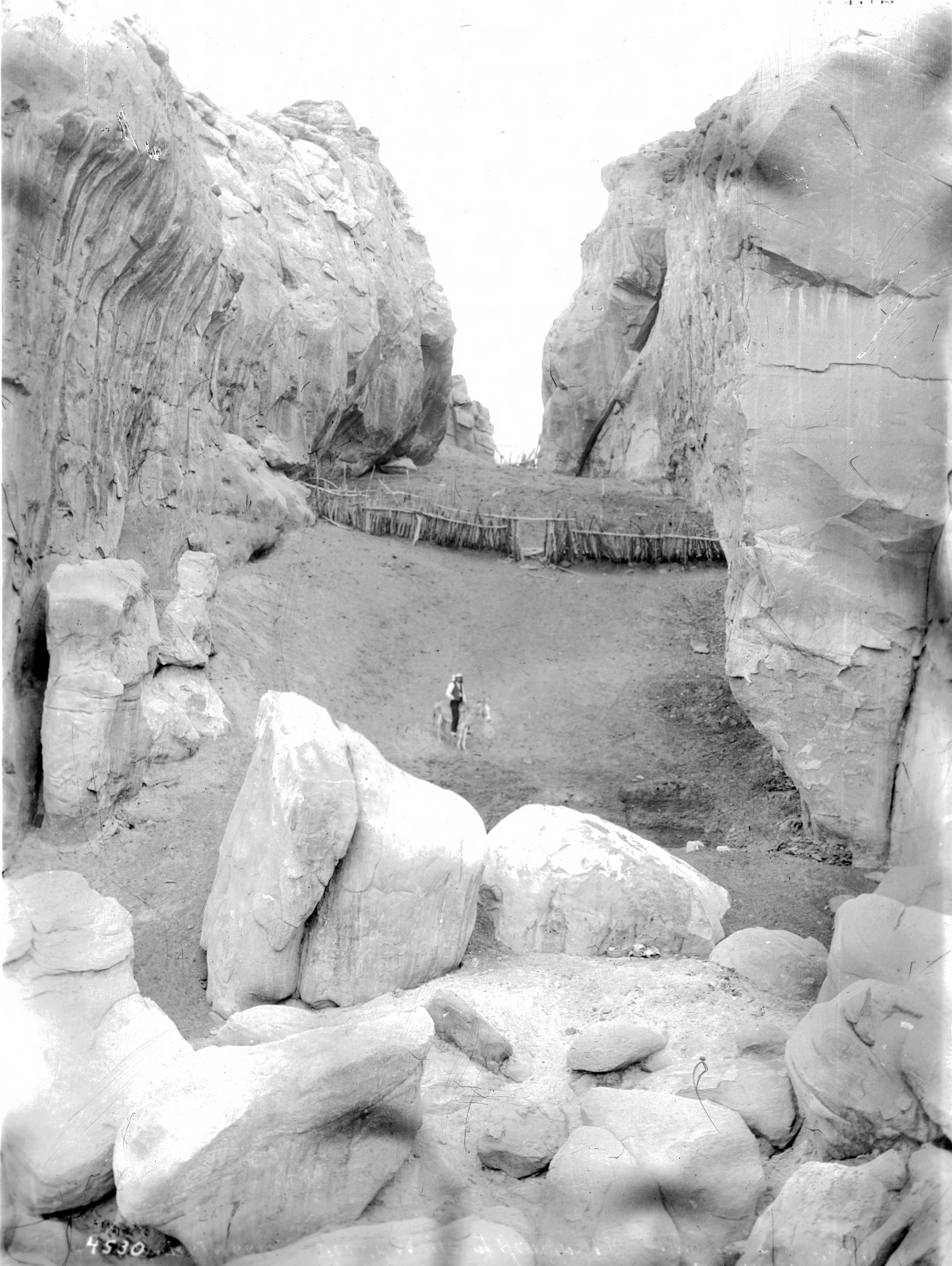
Corral between the rock walls near the Acoma Pueblo, 1886

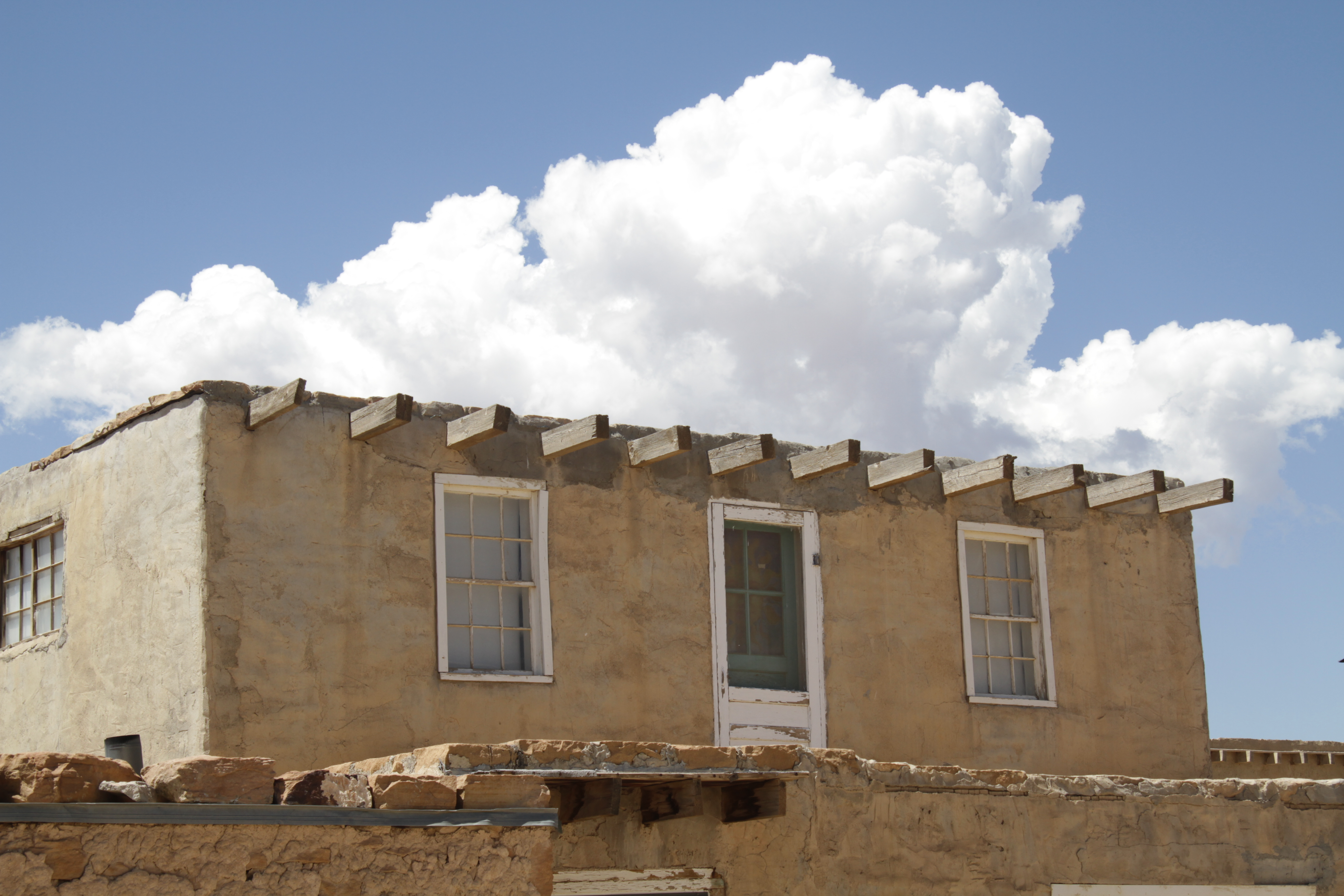
An Acoma building

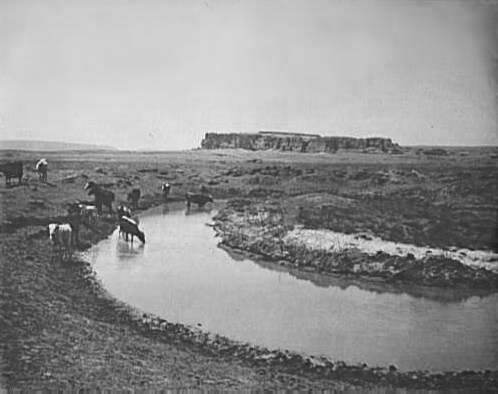
View of Acoma mesa, 1899

== See also ==
- San Estevan Del Rey Mission Church
- Acoma Indian Reservation
- Solomon Bibo
- Enchanted Mesa
- National Register of Historic Places listings in Cibola County, New Mexico
- List of National Historic Landmarks in New Mexico
- List of Indian reservations in the United States
- List of Native American peoples in the United States
- List of the oldest buildings in the United States
