= Lowell D. Holmes Museum of Anthropology =

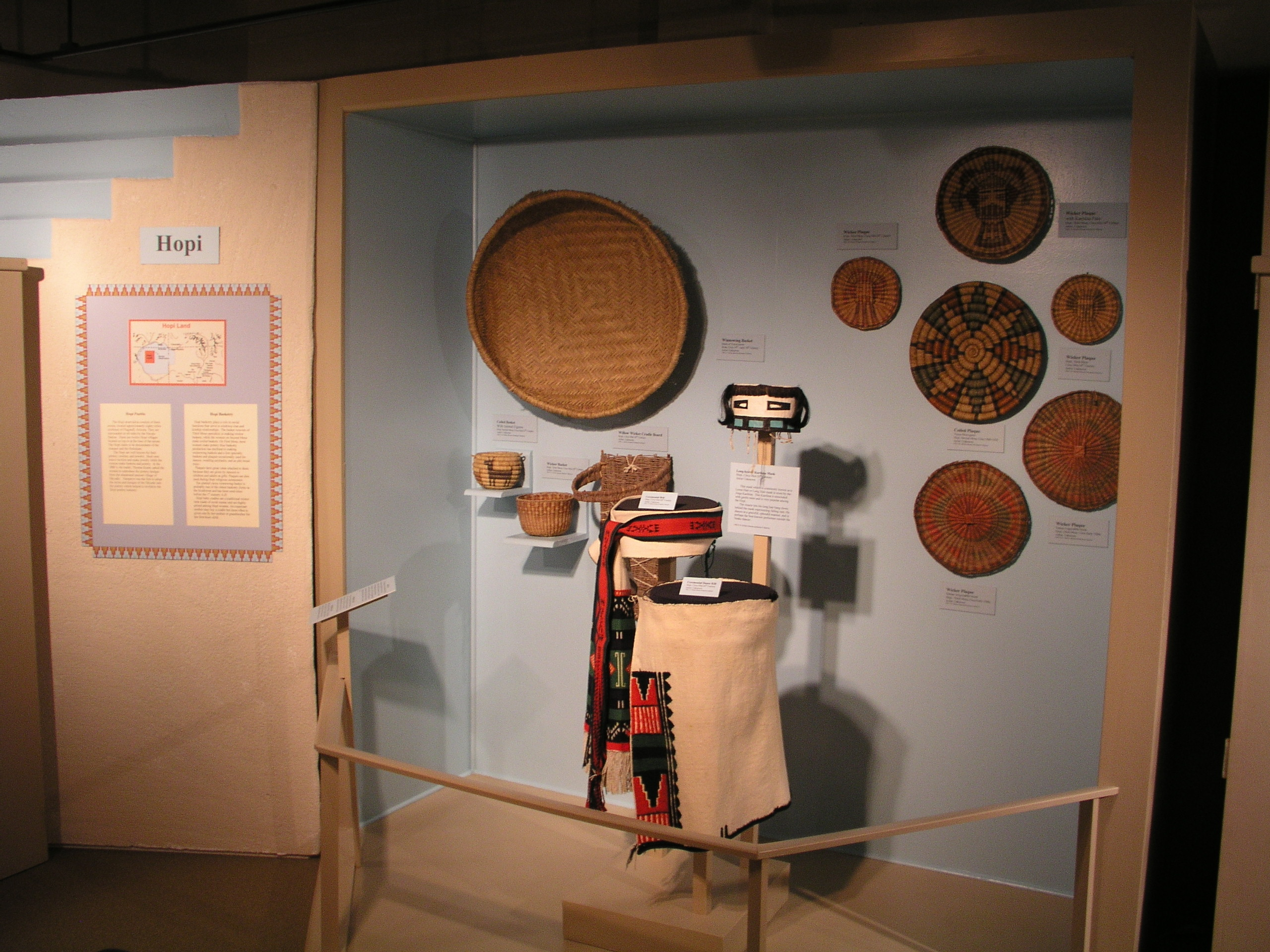
- Exhibit on Hopi culture
- Former name: Museum of Man
- Established: 1966
- Location: 1845 Fairmount St (Neff Hall), Wichita, KS 67260 USA
- Coordinates: 37°43′5″N 97°17′35″W
- Type: Anthropology museum, university museum
- Director: Rachelle Meinecke
- Owner: Wichita State University
- Website: wichita.edu/museums/holmes

The Lowell D. Holmes Museum of Anthropology began in 1966 as the Museum of Man, at the bequest and initiation of Dr. Lowell Holmes, Professor of Anthropology at Wichita State University in Wichita, Kansas, United States. Over the next 33 years it grew slowly and became known throughout the campus as a small but interesting museum. The collections and exhibitions include cultural items from around the world and archaeological objects predominantly from the American Midwest and Southwest. In 1999, the anthropology department and the museum moved to a new location in Neff Hall. The museum was expanded and Mr. Jerry Martin was hired as Director. This was the first time that the museum had a professional director whose only job was to work with, and develop the museum.

Martin's concept was to have the museum essentially run and operated by students as part of their museum studies training. He raised funds to hire student staff to run the day-to-day operations of the museum under his supervision. As of the fall semester of 2006, the museum had the funds to hire five student positions. The museum has a wide range of functions. It has exhibitions open to the public, houses a rapidly expanding collection, a support unit for the anthropology department and faculty of Wichita State University, a research facility for students, a repository for United States Government archaeological collections, and the basis for a growing museum studies program. These different functions provide a wide range of experience for the student staff.

== Important collections ==
=== Asmat art collection ===
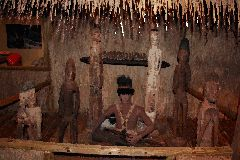

In 2001 the museum led an expedition into Western New Guinea, where they compiled a major collection of over 950 pieces of Asmat tribal art. In the fall of 2001, the museum received the Bakwin collection of nearly 120 pieces of Asmat art. Asmat art is famous for its large size, beauty, artistic quality and rarity. This collection is rapidly becoming well known. The only other comparable collections in the United States are the Michael Rockefeller Collection at the Metropolitan Museum of Art in New York City and the collection of the Asmat Museum of Art in St. Paul, MN.

=== Southwest pottery and ethnographic art collections ===
The museum houses the John Morgan collection of Southwest pottery, and the Emma and John Huff collection of Southwest Jewelry. The Holmes museum also has an extensive collection of pre-historic pottery of the American southwest.

=== Pre-Columbian pottery collection ===

The David Jackman collection consists of a large number of prehistoric Casas Grande and Colima ceramics. In addition, there is the Aitchison collection which contains a wide range of ceramics from prehistoric Pueblo cultures as well as Mayan, Veracruz and other Mesoamerican cultures.

=== Chinese minority clothing and ethnographic art collection ===
In 1988 and 1989 some museum staff and volunteers traveled to China to collect clothing and ethnographical objects from the minority Chinese groups. These trips produced an extensive collection from ethnic groups in Inner Mongolia, Northwestern and Southern China, and Tibet.

=== Archaeology collections ===
The Anthropology Department has four different archaeology laboratories to process and research the extensive archaeology collections housed in the department and the Holmes Museum. The collections are predominantly from Kansas and contiguous state and the Four Corners area of the American Southwest. The museum is a repository for Federal Government Archaeological collections and an official Long Term Curation Facility for the Bureau of Reclamations. These collections are used by students for educational and research purposes.

=== Media resources collection ===
The museum recently began a program of digitizing anthropological audio-visual material for archival purposes. Most of the old audio tapes, 8mm and 16mm films and video tapes were created by anthropologists in the field or by missionaries. The museum's objective is to create a digitized collection of this material and make them available for research and other educational purposes.

=== Current exhibitions ===
Recently a new exhibition opened which shows the current theories on human evolution and physical diversity. One segment of the exhibit depicts Charles Darwin’s round the world voyage on HMS Beagle where he developed his theory of Natural Selection. Another segment shows the separate development of Apes and Man throughout the last 34 million years.

The second recently completed exhibition is called “Southwestern Art: A Story of Transition and Change.” Located in the museum's Jackman Gallery, this exhibit features the Morgan Collection of Southwest Pueblo pottery and the Mullen collection of Southwest Jewelry. It tells the story of the importance of the railroad and tourism in the revival of Southwestern Art and how the art has become a major source of income for many Pueblo families. The exhibit includes over 80 examples of beautiful pottery from 14 different pueblos, and jewelry and textiles from both the Hopi and Navajo.

=== Virtual exhibitions and websites ===
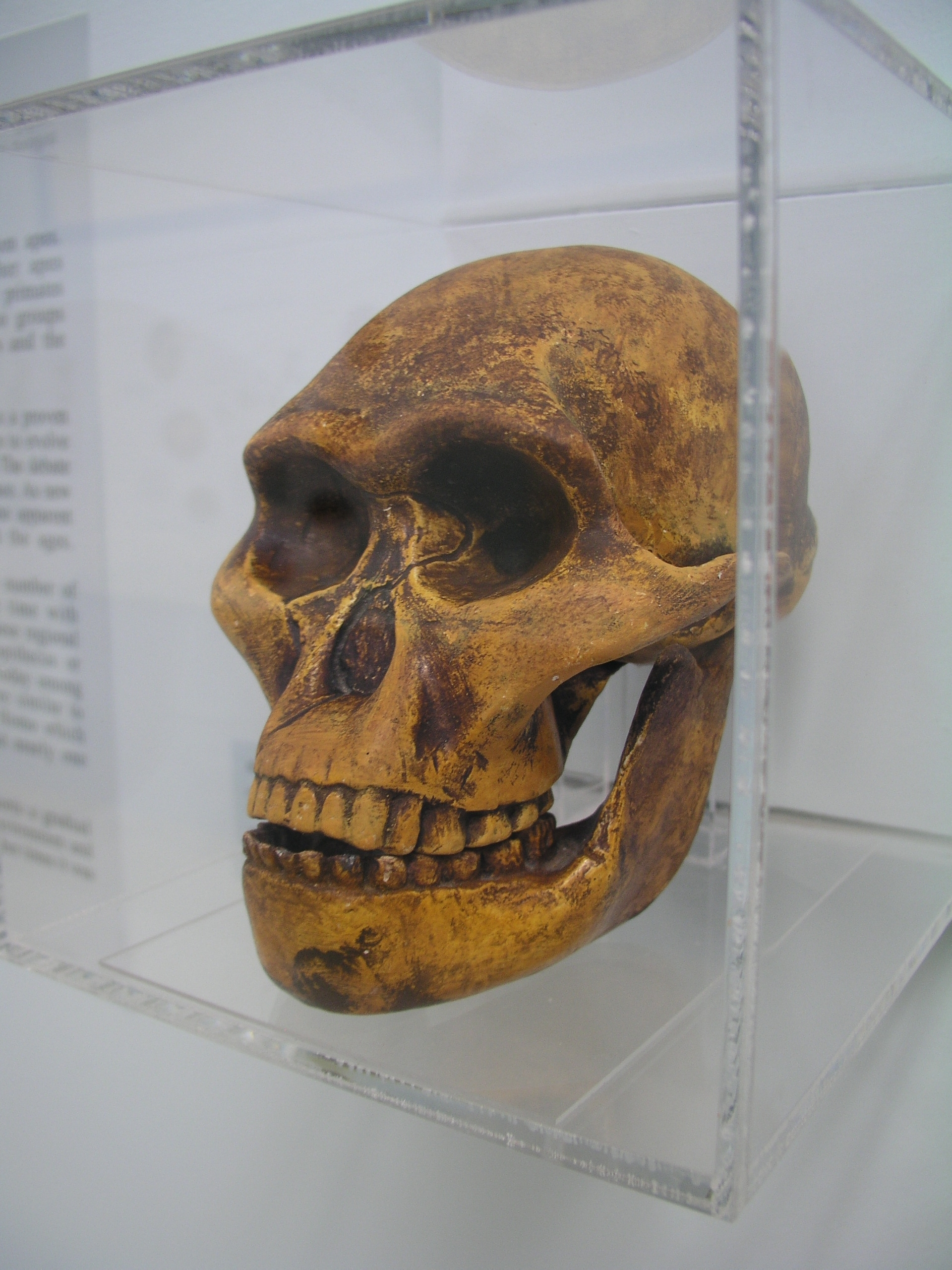

Currently the museum has a website titled “Through the Eyes of the Pot: The Morgan collection of Southwest Pottery”. This site shows the pots in the Morgan collection, gives a biography of the potters and has chapters on individual pueblos.

There is also a virtual exhibit which includes home movie footage, artifacts and recollections from missionaries to the Highlands of Papua New Guinea. This interactive exhibit is called "The Wagner Collection Field Journal: 1955-1969". It blends oral history and multimedia to describe the observations of missionaries among the Duna, Hewa and Enga of Papua New Guinea.

The museum has also developed a large and important website on the Asmat people of Papua, Indonesia titled "Art and Culture of the Asmat". Using the objects in the collection, photographs, as well as audio and video clips, the site explores the art, ceremonial life and culture of the Asmat people. Original documentary short films available on the website are also available on YouTube.

== Research ==
The Holmes Museum sponsors a wide range of research and academic programs. There are a number of students in the museum studies program and several on-going and potential student research projects. For example: a number of students have requested to base their master's degree projects on the Asmat collection.

During the summer of 2003, students, led by museum director Jerry Martin, traveled to the Guatemalan highlands to collect Mayan weavings and fiesta dance masks and study their symbolism and impact on the local indigenous populations. The objects they collect will become part of the museum's expanding contemporary Mayan ethnographic collection.

During the summer of 2007, the museum director and an anthropology graduate student returned to the Asmat region of New Guinea to produce videos to be used in an Asmat website. This website integrates text, video and audio in order to create a multimedia educational resource for the public. They also gathered footage in the Korowai cultural area.

== Location and directions ==

The Holmes Museum is located in Neff Hall on the campus of Wichita State University.

== See also ==
- Ulrich Museum of WSU
- List of museums in Kansas
