= National Register of Historic Places listings in Bernalillo County, New Mexico =

Location of Bernalillo County in New Mexico

There are 166 properties and districts listed on the National Register of Historic Places in Bernalillo County, New Mexico, United States, including one National Historic Landmark. Another five properties were once listed but have been removed.

Latitude and longitude coordinates are provided for many National Register properties and districts; these locations may be seen together in a map.

This National Park Service list is complete through NPS recent listings posted November 13, 2026.

Contents: NRHP in New Mexico by county
Bernalillo – Catron – Chaves – Cibola – Colfax – Curry – De Baca – Doña Ana – Eddy – Grant – Guadalupe – Harding – Hidalgo – Lea – Lincoln – Los Alamos – Luna – McKinley – Mora – Otero – Quay – Rio Arriba – Roosevelt – San Juan – San Miguel – Sandoval – Santa Fe – Sierra – Socorro – Taos – Torrance – Union – Valencia

== Current listings ==
	Name on the Register	Image	Date listed	Location	City or town	Description
1	Albuquerque Public Library	Albuquerque Public Library	August 19, 2024 (#100010754)	423 Central Avenue N.E. 35°05′02″N 106°38′33″W	Albuquerque	The Old Main Library, built in 1925.
2	Albuquerque Veterans Administration Medical Center	Albuquerque Veterans Administration Medical Center	August 19, 1983 (#83001614)	2100 Ridgecrest, SE. 35°03′18″N 106°35′02″W	Albuquerque	
3	Gavino Anaya House	Gavino Anaya House	February 9, 1984 (#84002840)	2939 Duranes Rd., NW. 35°06′32″N 106°40′57″W	Albuquerque	
4	Juan Cristobal Armijo Homestead		September 30, 1982 (#82003309)	207 Griegos Rd., NE. 35°07′42″N 106°37′59″W	Albuquerque	Hacienda hidden by shrubberies.
5	Salvador Armijo House	Salvador Armijo House	October 8, 1976 (#76001191)	618 Rio Grande Boulevard, NW. 35°05′58″N 106°40′10″W	Albuquerque	
6	Art Annex	Art Annex	September 22, 1988 (#88001540)	Northeastern corner of Central Ave. and Terrace St., University of New Mexico; 35°04′53″N 106°37′27″W	Albuquerque	
7	AT & SF Freight Office	AT & SF Freight Office	December 24, 2013 (#13000971)	314 1st St. 35°04′54″N 106°38′54″W	Albuquerque	Part of the Central Albuquerque MPS
8	Atchison, Topeka and Santa Fe Railway Locomotive Shops	Atchison, Topeka and Santa Fe Railway Locomotive Shops	October 15, 2014 (#14000859)	Roughly bounded by BNSF RR, 1st & 2nd Sts. 35°04′33″N 106°39′01″W	Albuquerque	
9	ATSF Locomotive No. 2926	ATSF Locomotive No. 2926	October 1, 2007 (#07000388)	1600 12th St., NW. 35°06′11″N 106°39′15″W	Albuquerque	
10	Aztec Auto Court	Aztec Auto Court	November 22, 1993 (#93001217)	3821 Central Ave., NE. 35°04′46″N 106°36′03″W	Albuquerque	Demolished in 2011
11	Adrian Barela House	Adrian Barela House	February 9, 1984 (#84002843)	7618 Guadalupe Trail, NW. 35°10′15″N 106°38′24″W	Los Ranchos de Albuquerque	
12	Barela-Bledsoe House	Barela-Bledsoe House	March 12, 1979 (#79001534)	7017 Edith Boulevard, NE. 35°09′32″N 106°37′14″W	Albuquerque	
13	Barelas Community Center	Barelas Community Center	December 9, 2021 (#100007239)	801 Barelas Rd. SW; 35°04′40″N 106°39′23″W	Albuquerque	
14	Barelas-South Fourth Street Historic District	Barelas-South Fourth Street Historic District	July 24, 1997 (#97000774)	4th St. from Stover Ave. to Bridge St. 35°04′26″N 106°39′10″W	Albuquerque	
15	Charles A. Bottger House	Charles A. Bottger House	March 7, 1983 (#83001615)	110 San Felipe, NW. 35°05′41″N 106°40′08″W	Albuquerque	
16	Broadmoor Addition	Broadmoor Addition	July 5, 2022 (#100007699)	Roughly bounded by Brockmont and Copper Aves, Morningside Dr., and Washington St. 35°04′58″N 106°35′50″W	Albuquerque	
17	Building at 701 Roma NW	Building at 701 Roma NW	February 28, 1985 (#85000375)	701 Roma, NW. 35°05′23″N 106°39′14″W	Albuquerque	
18	Cal-Linn Building (MITS and Microsoft Headquarters)		September 1, 2026 (#100013365)	6320 Linn Avenue NE; 35°04′40″N 106°34′35″W	Albuquerque	
19	Carlisle Gymnasium	Carlisle Gymnasium	September 22, 1988 (#88001541)	University of New Mexico campus, west of Yale Boulevard; 35°05′01″N 106°37′19″W	Albuquerque	
20	Chester Carnes House	Chester Carnes House	December 1, 1980 (#80002529)	701 13th St., NW. 35°05′38″N 106°39′36″W	Albuquerque	
21	Castle Apartments	Castle Apartments	February 13, 1986 (#86000219)	1410 Central, SW. 35°05′17″N 106°39′50″W	Albuquerque	Demolished in 2010 after fire
22	Juan Chavez House	Juan Chavez House	February 9, 1984 (#84002849)	7809 4th St., NW. 35°09′46″N 106°38′04″W	Albuquerque	
23	Juan de Dios Chavez House	Juan de Dios Chavez House	February 9, 1984 (#84002847)	205 Griegos Rd., NW. 35°07′42″N 106°37′58″W	Albuquerque	
24	Rumaldo Chavez House	Rumaldo Chavez House	November 24, 1980 (#80002530)	10023 Edith Boulevard, NE. 35°11′35″N 106°36′11″W	Alameda	
25	Congregation B'nai Israel	Congregation B'nai Israel	May 2, 2019 (#100003674)	4401 Indian School Rd. 35°06′07″N 106°35′41″W	Albuquerque	
26	Coronado School	Coronado School	November 22, 1996 (#96001383)	601 4th St., SW. 35°04′44″N 106°39′08″W	Albuquerque	
27	Cottage Bakery	Cottage Bakery	November 22, 1993 (#93001218)	2000 Central Ave., SE. 35°04′51″N 106°37′25″W	Albuquerque	
28	Davis House	Davis House	November 17, 1980 (#80002531)	704 Parkland Circle, SE. 35°04′11″N 106°36′10″W	Albuquerque	
29	De Anza Motor Lodge	De Anza Motor Lodge	April 30, 2004 (#04000375)	4301 Central Ave., NE. 35°04′48″N 106°35′44″W	Albuquerque	Mostly demolished in 2018
30	Robert Dietz Farmhouse	Robert Dietz Farmhouse	February 9, 1984 (#84002852)	4117 Rio Grande Boulevard, NW. 35°08′23″N 106°40′04″W	Albuquerque	
31	Downtowner Motor Inn	Downtowner Motor Inn	November 4, 2020 (#100005731)	717 Central Ave. NW; 35°05′07″N 106°39′22″W	Albuquerque	
32	Eighth Street-Forrester District	Eighth Street-Forrester District	December 1, 1980 (#80002532)	Roughly bounded by Mountain Rd., Lomas Boulevard, and Forrester and 7th Sts. 35°05′37″N 106°39′17″W	Albuquerque	
33	El Campo Tourist Courts	El Campo Tourist Courts	January 13, 1994 (#93001465)	5800 Central Ave., SW. 35°04′52″N 106°42′10″W	Albuquerque	
34	El Vado Auto Court	El Vado Auto Court	November 22, 1993 (#93001214)	2500 Central Ave., SW. 35°05′39″N 106°40′36″W	Albuquerque	
35	Eller Apartments	Eller Apartments	January 12, 1984 (#84002855)	113-127 8th St., SW. 35°05′04″N 106°39′22″W	Albuquerque	
36	Employees' New Dormitory and Club	Employees' New Dormitory and Club	July 26, 1982 (#82003310)	Albuquerque Indian School campus 35°06′26″N 106°39′18″W	Albuquerque	
37	Enchanted Mesa Trading Post	Enchanted Mesa Trading Post	January 9, 1998 (#97001595)	9612 Central Ave., SE. 35°04′15″N 106°32′25″W	Albuquerque	
38	Estufa	Estufa	September 22, 1988 (#88001542)	Southeastern corner of University Boulevard and Grand Ave., University of New Mexico; 35°05′02″N 106°37′31″W	Albuquerque	
39	Federal Building	Federal Building	November 22, 1980 (#80002533)	421 Gold Ave., SW. 35°05′02″N 106°39′08″W	Albuquerque	Built 1930. Federal Building and U.S. Courthouse, 500 Gold A venue, SW, Albuquerque, MP100009558, LISTED, 11/14/2023
40	Federal Building and U.S. Courthouse	Federal Building and U.S. Courthouse	November 14, 2023 (#100009558)	500 Gold Ave., SW. 35°05′01″N 106°39′12″W	Albuquerque	The Dennis Chavez Federal Building
41	First Methodist Episcopal Church	First Methodist Episcopal Church	November 7, 1976 (#76001192)	3rd St. and Lead Ave. 35°04′52″N 106°39′02″W	Albuquerque	
42	First National Bank Building	First National Bank Building	February 2, 1979 (#79003127)	217-233 Central Ave., NW. 35°05′05″N 106°38′58″W	Albuquerque	
43	Five Points Community Church	Five Points Community Church	July 1, 2024 (#100010498)	1534 Bridge Boulevard SW; 35°03′58″N 106°40′33″W	Albuquerque	
44	C. M. Foraker Farmhouse		February 9, 1984 (#84002858)	905 Menaul Boulevard, NW. 35°06′46″N 106°39′12″W	Albuquerque	Burned down in 2008
45	Fourth Ward District	Fourth Ward District	December 1, 1980 (#80002534)	Roughly bounded by Central Ave., Lomas Boulevard, and 8th and 15th Sts. 35°05′26″N 106°39′27″W	Albuquerque	
46	Juan Antonio Garcia House	Juan Antonio Garcia House	September 28, 1982 (#82003311)	7442 Edith Boulevard, NE. 35°09′48″N 106°37′05″W	Albuquerque	
47	James N. Gladding House	James N. Gladding House	November 17, 1980 (#80002535)	643 Cedar St., NE. 35°05′17″N 106°37′50″W	Albuquerque	
48	Refugio Gomez House		February 9, 1984 (#84002864)	7604 Guadalupe Trail, NW. 35°10′13″N 106°38′24″W	Los Ranchos de Albuquerque	
49	Granada Heights	Granada Heights	July 5, 2022 (#100007700)	Roughly bounded by Silver and Garfield Aves., Carlisle Blvd., and Morningside Dr. 35°04′32″N 106°36′08″W	Albuquerque	
50	Charles Grande House	Charles Grande House	February 9, 1984 (#84002866)	4317 Grande St., NW. 35°07′46″N 106°39′17″W	Albuquerque	
51	Tomasa Griego de Garcia House		June 19, 1979 (#79001535)	6939 Edith Boulevard, NE. 35°09′29″N 106°37′18″W	Albuquerque	
52	Delfina Gurule House	Delfina Gurule House	December 1, 1980 (#80002536)	306 16th St., NW. 35°05′32″N 106°39′48″W	Albuquerque	
53	Harwood School	Harwood School	December 1, 1980 (#80002537)	1114 7th St., NW. 35°05′42″N 106°39′10″W	Albuquerque	
54	A. W. Hayden House	A. W. Hayden House	December 1, 1980 (#80002538)	609 Marble St., NW. 35°05′37″N 106°39′07″W	Albuquerque	
55	Heights Community Center	Heights Community Center	December 9, 2021 (#100007238)	823 Buena Vista Ave. SE; 35°04′24″N 106°37′27″W	Albuquerque	
56	Hendren Building	Hendren Building	January 27, 2000 (#99001678)	3001 Monte Vista Boulevard, NE. 35°05′00″N 106°36′43″W	Albuquerque	
57	Hilltop Lodge	Hilltop Lodge	January 9, 1998 (#97001597)	5410 Central Ave. SW. 35°04′56″N 106°41′47″W	Albuquerque	Demolished in 2003
58	Hodgin Hall	Hodgin Hall	January 30, 1978 (#78001803)	University of New Mexico campus 35°04′54″N 106°37′29″W	Albuquerque	
59	Hoffmantown Baptist Church	Hoffmantown Baptist Church	October 25, 2019 (#100004492)	2335 Wyoming Blvd. NE; 35°06′39″N 106°33′04″W	Albuquerque	
60	Holy Child Church	Holy Child Church	March 8, 1978 (#78001810)	Off Interstate 40; 35°04′47″N 106°23′23″W	Tijeras	
61	Hope Building	Hope Building	August 29, 1980 (#80002539)	220 Gold St., SW. 35°04′27″N 106°38′58″W	Albuquerque	
62	Lulu Hopping House	Lulu Hopping House	May 1, 2026 (#100012951)	737 Edith Boulevard SE; 35°04′33″N 106°38′36″W	Albuquerque	
63	James Lawrence and Juliana Gutierrez y Chavez Hubbell House	James Lawrence and Juliana Gutierrez y Chavez Hubbell House	August 3, 2015 (#15000491)	6029 Isleta Blvd. SW. 34°59′21″N 106°41′45″W	Albuquerque	
64	Hudson House	Hudson House	February 24, 1982 (#82003313)	817 Gold Ave., SW. 35°05′04″N 106°39′24″W	Albuquerque	
65	Huning Highlands Conoco Service Station	Huning Highlands Conoco Service Station	July 19, 2006 (#06000633)	601 Coal Ave., SE. 35°04′52″N 106°38′30″W	Albuquerque	
66	Huning Highlands Historic District	Huning Highlands Historic District	November 17, 1978 (#78001804)	Bounded by Grand Ave., Interstate 25, Iron Ave., and the former Santa Fe railroad line 35°04′51″N 106°38′31″W	Albuquerque	
67	Immanuel Presbyterian Church	Immanuel Presbyterian Church	February 22, 2011 (#11000032)	114 Carlisle Boulevard SE; 35°04′43″N 106°36′15″W	Albuquerque	Buildings Designed by John Gaw Meem MPS
68	Isleta Pueblo	Isleta Pueblo	September 5, 1975 (#75001162)	U.S. Route 85; 34°54′31″N 106°41′30″W	Isleta Pueblo	
69	Jones Motor Company	Jones Motor Company	November 22, 1993 (#93001219)	3226 Central Ave., SE. 35°04′38″N 106°37′09″W	Albuquerque	
70	Jonson Gallery and House	Jonson Gallery and House	February 22, 2002 (#02000050)	1909 Las Lomas Rd., NE. 35°05′13″N 106°37′15″W	Albuquerque	
71	Kimo Theater	Kimo Theater	May 2, 1977 (#77000920)	421 Central Ave. 35°05′06″N 106°39′07″W	Albuquerque	
72	S. H. Kress Building	S. H. Kress Building	April 19, 1984 (#84002871)	414-416 Central Ave., SW. 35°05′04″N 106°39′07″W	Albuquerque	
73	Kromer House	Kromer House	October 4, 1982 (#82001048)	1024 El Pueblo Rd., NW. 35°10′44″N 106°38′27″W	Los Ranchos de Albuquerque	
74	La Glorieta House	La Glorieta House	August 19, 1983 (#83001616)	1801 Central Ave., NW. 35°05′34″N 106°39′56″W	Albuquerque	
75	La Mesa Motel		November 22, 1993 (#93001220)	7407 Central Ave., NE. 35°04′32″N 106°33′51″W	Albuquerque	Demolished in 2003
76	La Puerta Lodge	La Puerta Lodge	January 9, 1998 (#97001596)	9710 Central Ave., SE. 35°04′09″N 106°32′22″W	Albuquerque	
77	Las Imagines Archeological District-Albuquerque West Mesa Escarpment		November 19, 1986 (#86003142)	Address Restricted	Albuquerque	
78	Charles LeFeber House		December 1, 1980 (#80002540)	313 15th St. NW; 35°05′28″N 106°39′49″W	Albuquerque	
79	Lembke House	Lembke House	November 25, 1980 (#80002541)	312 Laguna Blvd. SW; 35°05′18″N 106°40′05″W	Albuquerque	
80	Aldo Leopold Neighborhood Historic District	Aldo Leopold Neighborhood Historic District	October 16, 2002 (#02001164)	105-135 14th St., SW. 35°05′15″N 106°39′45″W	Albuquerque	
81	William J. Leverett House	William J. Leverett House	February 13, 1986 (#86000221)	301 Dartmouth, NE. 35°05′08″N 106°36′44″W	Albuquerque	
82	Charles W. Lewis Building	Charles W. Lewis Building	July 3, 1979 (#79001533)	1405-1407 2nd St., SW. 35°04′18″N 106°39′05″W	Albuquerque	
83	Hilario Lopez House	Hilario Lopez House	December 1, 1980 (#80002542)	208 16th St., NW. 35°05′28″N 106°39′48″W	Albuquerque	
84	Los Candelarias Chapel-San Antonio Chapel	Los Candelarias Chapel-San Antonio Chapel	February 9, 1984 (#84002844)	1934 Candelaria Rd., NW. 35°07′17″N 106°40′00″W	Albuquerque	
85	Los Duranes Chapel	Los Duranes Chapel	February 9, 1984 (#84002854)	2601 Indian School Rd., NW. 35°06′39″N 106°40′28″W	Albuquerque	
86	Los Griegos Historic District	Los Griegos Historic District	February 9, 1984 (#84002874)	Griegos Rd. and Rio Grande Boulevard; 35°08′09″N 106°39′46″W	Albuquerque	
87	Los Poblanos Historic District	Los Poblanos Historic District	May 27, 1982 (#82003321)	State Road 194; 35°08′46″N 106°40′05″W	Los Ranchos de Albuquerque	
88	Los Tomases Chapel	Los Tomases Chapel	February 9, 1984 (#84002876)	3101 Los Tomases, NW. 35°06′56″N 106°38′55″W	Albuquerque	
89	Francisco Lucero y Montoya House		February 9, 1984 (#84002880)	9742 4th St., NW. 35°11′32″N 106°36′56″W	Alameda	
90	Luna Lodge	Luna Lodge	June 11, 1998 (#98000600)	9119 Central Ave., NE. 35°04′25″N 106°32′43″W	Albuquerque	
91	La Luz del Oeste		October 27, 2023 (#100009493)	Loop One NW; 35°08′28″N 106°41′47″W	Albuquerque	
92	Main Library	Main Library	June 13, 2019 (#100003217)	501 Copper Ave. NW. 35°05′09″N 106°39′12″W	Albuquerque	
93	Maisel's Indian Trading Post	Maisel's Indian Trading Post	November 22, 1993 (#93001215)	510 Central Ave., SW. 35°05′04″N 106°39′10″W	Albuquerque	
94	Henry Mann House	Henry Mann House	December 1, 1980 (#80002543)	723 14th St., NW. 35°05′44″N 106°39′38″W	Albuquerque	
95	Manzano Court Addition Historic District	Manzano Court Addition Historic District	October 14, 2004 (#03001234)	1000-1025 Manzano Court, NW. 35°05′43″N 106°39′29″W	Albuquerque	
96	McCanna-Hubbell Building	McCanna-Hubbell Building	May 13, 1982 (#82003314)	418-424 Central, SW. 35°05′04″N 106°39′07″W	Albuquerque	
97	Medical Arts Historic District	Medical Arts Historic District	January 2, 2024 (#100009505)	711, 717, and 801 Encino Place NE and 1010 Las Lomas Boulevard NE; 35°05′24″N 106°37′55″W	Albuquerque	
98	Menaul School Historic District	Menaul School Historic District	February 14, 1983 (#83001617)	Roughly bounded by Broadway, Claremont, Edith, and Menaul Aves., and 301 Menaul Boulevard, NE. 35°06′44″N 106°38′14″W	Albuquerque	
99	John Milne House	John Milne House	February 13, 1986 (#86000223)	804 Park Ave., SW. 35°05′06″N 106°39′23″W	Albuquerque	
100	Modern Auto Court	Modern Auto Court	November 22, 1993 (#93001221)	3712 Central Ave., SE. 35°04′44″N 106°36′08″W	Albuquerque	
101	Monte Vista and College View Historic District	Monte Vista and College View Historic District	August 3, 2001 (#01000770)	Roughly bounded by Girard and Lomas Boulevards, Morningside Dr., Copper Ave., and Campus and Monte Vista Boulevards. 35°05′02″N 106°36′23″W	Albuquerque	
102	Monte Vista Fire Station	Monte Vista Fire Station	March 19, 1987 (#87001121)	3201 Central Ave., NE. 35°04′51″N 106°36′31″W	Albuquerque	
103	Monte Vista School	Monte Vista School	August 12, 1981 (#81000399)	3211 Monte Vista Boulevard, NE. 35°04′58″N 106°36′35″W	Albuquerque	
104	National Humane Alliance Animal Fountain	National Humane Alliance Animal Fountain	September 30, 1986 (#86003120)	615 Virginia Ave., SE. 35°04′02″N 106°33′09″W	Albuquerque	
105	New Mexico Madonna of the Trail	New Mexico Madonna of the Trail	March 21, 2006 (#06000151)	Junction of Marble Ave. and 4th St. 35°05′41″N 106°38′59″W	Albuquerque	
106	New Mexico-Arizona Wool Warehouse	New Mexico-Arizona Wool Warehouse	July 23, 1981 (#81000400)	520 1st St., NW. 35°05′19″N 106°38′48″W	Albuquerque	
107	Newlander Apartments	Newlander Apartments	January 27, 2000 (#99001677)	616 Coal Ave. SW; 35°04′58″N 106°39′20″W	Albuquerque	
108	Nob Hill Business Center	Nob Hill Business Center	March 18, 1994 (#84004143)	3500 Central Ave., SE. 35°04′46″N 106°36′16″W	Albuquerque	
109	Robert Nordhaus House	Robert Nordhaus House	February 9, 1984 (#84002883)	6900 Rio Grande Boulevard, NW. 35°09′47″N 106°39′00″W	Albuquerque	
110	J. H. O'Rielly House	J. H. O'Rielly House	January 29, 1979 (#79003442)	220 9th St., NW. 35°05′13″N 106°39′23″W	Albuquerque	
111	Occidental Life Building	Occidental Life Building	January 30, 1978 (#78001805)	119 3rd Ave., SW. 35°05′01″N 106°39′01″W	Albuquerque	
112	Old Albuquerque Municipal Airport Building	Old Albuquerque Municipal Airport Building	May 5, 1989 (#89000348)	2920 Yale Boulevard, SE. 35°02′52″N 106°37′14″W	Albuquerque	
113	Old Armijo School	Old Armijo School	September 16, 1982 (#82003315)	1021 Isleta Boulevard, SE. 35°03′22″N 106°40′11″W	Albuquerque	
114	Old Hilton Hotel	Old Hilton Hotel	March 2, 1984 (#84002868)	125 2nd St., NW. 35°05′06″N 106°38′56″W	Albuquerque	
115	Old Post Office	Old Post Office	November 17, 1980 (#80002544)	123 4th St., SW. 35°05′01″N 106°39′08″W	Albuquerque	
116	Our Lady of Mt. Carmel Church	Our Lady of Mt. Carmel Church	February 9, 1984 (#84002884)	7813 Edith Boulevard, NE. 35°10′08″N 106°37′03″W	Albuquerque	
117	Our Lady of the Angels School	Our Lady of the Angels School	November 29, 1984 (#84000426)	320 Romero St., NW. 35°05′49″N 106°40′11″W	Albuquerque	
118	Pacific Desk Building	Pacific Desk Building	September 30, 1980 (#80002545)	213-215 Gold Ave., SW. 35°05′00″N 106°38′58″W	Albuquerque	
119	Parkland Hills Historic District	Parkland Hills Historic District	June 7, 2019 (#100004034)	Roughly bounded by Zuni Rd., Garfield and Smith Aves, Valverde Dr., and Carlisle Blvd. 35°04′16″N 106°36′00″W	Albuquerque	
120	John Pearce House	John Pearce House	November 22, 1980 (#80002546)	718 Central Ave., SW. 35°05′05″N 106°39′18″W	Albuquerque	
121	Petroglyph National Monument	Petroglyph National Monument	June 27, 1990 (#01000279)	6001 Unser Boulevard, NW. 35°09′46″N 106°43′18″W	Albuquerque	
122	Piedras Marcadas Pueblo (LA 290)		March 2, 1990 (#90000160)	Address Restricted	Albuquerque	
123	Pig 'n Calf Lunch	Pig 'n Calf Lunch	February 15, 1994 (#93001222)	2106 Central Ave., SE. 35°04′51″N 106°37′21″W	Albuquerque	
124	President's House	President's House	September 22, 1988 (#88001543)	Northeastern corner of Roma Ave. and Yale Boulevard, University of New Mexico; 35°05′11″N 106°37′15″W	Albuquerque	Now called University House.
125	Ernie Pyle House	Ernie Pyle House	September 22, 1997 (#97001103)	900 Girard Boulevard, SE. 35°04′13″N 106°36′45″W	Albuquerque	
126	Rancho de Carnue Site	Rancho de Carnue Site	May 4, 1977 (#77000921)	Address Restricted	Albuquerque	
127	Sara Raynolds Hall	Sara Raynolds Hall	September 22, 1988 (#88001544)	University of New Mexico campus on Terrace St., north of Central Ave. 35°04′53″N 106°37′24″W	Albuquerque	
128	Rio Puerco Bridge	Rio Puerco Bridge	July 15, 1997 (#97000735)	Interstate 40 over the Rio Puerco; 35°02′00″N 106°56′29″W	Albuquerque	
129	Felipe Romero House	Felipe Romero House	February 9, 1984 (#84002885)	7522 Edith Boulevard, NE. 35°09′55″N 106°37′03″W	Albuquerque	
130	Roosevelt Park	Roosevelt Park	November 22, 1996 (#96001384)	Junction of Coal and Spruce Aves., SE. 35°04′35″N 106°37′49″W	Albuquerque	
131	Rosenwald Building	Rosenwald Building	June 29, 1978 (#78001806)	320 Central Ave., SW. 35°05′03″N 106°39′03″W	Albuquerque	
132	Route 66, State maintained from Albuquerque to Rio Puerco	Route 66, State maintained from Albuquerque to Rio Puerco	November 19, 1997 (#97001396)	Former U.S. Route 66 west central exit at Interstate 40 to the Rio Puerco bridge 35°02′55″N 106°52′04″W	Albuquerque	
133	St. John's Cathedral	St. John's Cathedral	October 19, 2018 (#100003029)	318 Silver Ave. 35°04′56″N 106°39′06″W	Albuquerque	
134	Saint Joseph 1930 Hospital	Saint Joseph 1930 Hospital	May 27, 1982 (#82003316)	715 Grand, NE. 35°05′09″N 106°38′18″W	Albuquerque	
135	San Antonito Church and Cemetery	San Antonito Church and Cemetery	January 16, 1997 (#96001607)	Northwestern corner of the junction of State Roads 14 and 536; 35°09′50″N 106°20′46″W	San Antonito	
136	San Felipe de Neri Church	San Felipe de Neri Church	October 1, 1969 (#69000140)	Old Town Plaza, NW. 35°05′47″N 106°40′09″W	Albuquerque	
137	San Ignacio Church	San Ignacio Church	August 21, 1979 (#79001536)	1300 Walter St., NE. 35°05′43″N 106°38′15″W	Albuquerque	
138	Santa Barbara School	Santa Barbara School	September 28, 1989 (#89001590)	1420 Edith Boulevard, NE. 35°05′51″N 106°38′17″W	Albuquerque	Burned in 2026
139	Scholes Hall	Scholes Hall	September 22, 1988 (#88001545)	University of New Mexico campus, south of Roma Ave. 35°05′08″N 106°37′23″W	Albuquerque	
140	Second United Presbyterian Church	Second United Presbyterian Church	December 6, 1984 (#84000563)	812 Edith Boulevard, NE. 35°05′26″N 106°38′21″W	Albuquerque	
141	Samuel Shalit House	Samuel Shalit House	February 9, 1984 (#84002888)	5209 4th St., NW. 35°08′06″N 106°38′30″W	Albuquerque	
142	Shoup Boarding House		February 17, 1983 (#83001618)	707 1st St., SW. 35°04′40″N 106°38′56″W	Albuquerque	Demolished
143	Silver Hill Historic District	Silver Hill Historic District	September 18, 1986 (#86002414)	Roughly bounded by Central Ave., Yale Boulevard, Lead Ave., and Sycamore St. 35°04′46″N 106°37′33″W	Albuquerque	
144	Simms Building	Simms Building	February 2, 1998 (#97001653)	400 Gold Ave., SW. 35°05′00″N 106°39′06″W	Albuquerque	
145	Skinner Building	Skinner Building	November 22, 1980 (#80004485)	722-724 Central Ave. and 108 8th St., SW. 35°05′06″N 106°39′20″W	Albuquerque	
146	Solar Building	Solar Building	October 10, 1989 (#89001589)	213 Truman St., NE. 35°04′51″N 106°35′13″W	Albuquerque	
147	Southern Union Gas Company Building	Southern Union Gas Company Building	March 31, 2004 (#04000252)	723 Silver Ave., SW. 35°05′06″N 106°39′23″W	Albuquerque	
148	Southwestern Brewery and Ice Company	Southwestern Brewery and Ice Company	March 30, 1978 (#78001807)	601 Commercial St., NE. 35°05′20″N 106°38′42″W	Albuquerque	
149	Berthold Spitz House	Berthold Spitz House	December 22, 1977 (#77000922)	323 N. 10th St. 35°05′19″N 106°39′28″W	Albuquerque	
150	Springer Building	Springer Building	November 18, 1980 (#80002547)	121 Tijeras Ave., NE. 35°05′09″N 106°38′43″W	Albuquerque	
151	Spruce Park Historic District	Spruce Park Historic District	July 6, 1982 (#82003317)	Roughly bounded by University Boulevard, Grand Ave., Las Lomas Rd., and Cedar St. 35°05′13″N 106°37′48″W	Albuquerque	
152	Superintendent's House, Atlantic & Pacific Railroad	Superintendent's House, Atlantic & Pacific Railroad	January 20, 1978 (#78001808)	1023 2nd St. SW; 35°04′29″N 106°39′03″W	Albuquerque	
153	Domingo Tafoya House		November 17, 1980 (#80002528)	10021 Edith Boulevard, NE. 35°11′35″N 106°36′12″W	Alameda	
154	Tewa Lodge	Tewa Lodge	June 11, 1998 (#98000599)	5715 Central Ave. NE. 35°04′40″N 106°34′53″W	Albuquerque	
155	Tijeras Pueblo Archeological Site	Tijeras Pueblo Archeological Site	November 17, 2005 (#05001294)	South of central Tijeras off State Road 337; 35°04′30″N 106°23′00″W	Tijeras	
156	Tower Court	Tower Court	November 22, 1993 (#93001216)	2210 Central Ave., SW. 35°05′42″N 106°40′26″W	Albuquerque	
157	University Heights	University Heights	September 4, 2025 (#100012198)	Bounded by Harvard Drive, Carlisle Boulevard and Silver and Garfield Avenues; 35°04′38″N 106°36′48″W	Albuquerque	
158	Antonio Vigil House	Antonio Vigil House	May 5, 1978 (#78001809)	413 Romero St. 35°05′52″N 106°40′12″W	Albuquerque	
159	Vista Larga Residential Historic District		April 12, 2016 (#16000160)	Roughly bounded by Indian School Rd., Columbia Dr., Hannett Ave., and University of New Mexico North Golf Course; 35°06′02″N 106°37′09″W	Albuquerque	
160	Washington Apartments	Washington Apartments	February 19, 1982 (#82003319)	1002-1008 Central Ave., SW. 35°05′11″N 106°39′31″W	Albuquerque	
161	Werner-Gilchrist House	Werner-Gilchrist House	August 2, 1982 (#82003320)	202 Cornell, SE. 35°04′44″N 106°37′07″W	Albuquerque	Demolished in 2011
162	West San Jose School	West San Jose School	November 22, 1996 (#96001385)	1701 4th St., SW. 35°04′06″N 106°39′06″W	Albuquerque	
163	Whitcomb Springs		October 7, 2019 (#100004498)	82 Carlito Springs Rd. 35°05′15″N 106°24′01″W	Tijeras	
164	J. R. Willis House and La Miradora Apartments	J. R. Willis House and La Miradora Apartments	September 1, 2005 (#05000942)	310 Rio Grande Boulevard, SW. 35°05′36″N 106°40′16″W	Albuquerque	
165	Charles Zeiger House		April 27, 1984 (#84002889)	3200 Edith Boulevard, NE. 35°07′02″N 106°38′01″W	Albuquerque	Demolished
166	Zimmerman Library	Zimmerman Library	August 22, 2016 (#16000549)	1900 Roma Ave., NE. 35°05′09″N 106°37′17″W	Albuquerque	

== Former listings ==
	Name on the Register	Image	Date listed	Date removed	Location	City or town	Description
1	Alvarado Hotel Complex	Alvarado Hotel Complex	March 3, 1970 (#70000902)	August 4, 1970	110 1st Street SW	Albuquerque	Demolished in February 1970.
2	Gymnasium-Auditorium Building		July 26, 1982 (#82003312)	November 21, 1988	Albuquerque Indian School campus	Albuquerque	Destroyed by fire on July 28, 1987.
3	Charles Ilfeld Company Warehouse	Charles Ilfeld Company Warehouse	June 10, 1975 (#75002130)	January 1, 1978	200 1st St. NW	Albuquerque	Demolished in 1977.
4	Horn Oil Co. and Lodge	Horn Oil Co. and Lodge	January 9, 1998 (#97001591)	September 6, 2007	1720 Central Avenue; 35°05′29″N 106°39′59″W	Albuquerque	Mostly demolished in 2007.
5	University of New Mexico Lodge, Building 219		July 26, 1982 (#82003318)	July 23, 1990	Albuquerque Indian School campus	Albuquerque	Destroyed by fire in 1990.

== See also ==
- List of National Historic Landmarks in New Mexico
- National Register of Historic Places listings in New Mexico
