= Juan Chavez House =

Historic house in New Mexico, United States

- U.S. National Register of Historic Places
- NM State Register of Cultural Properties
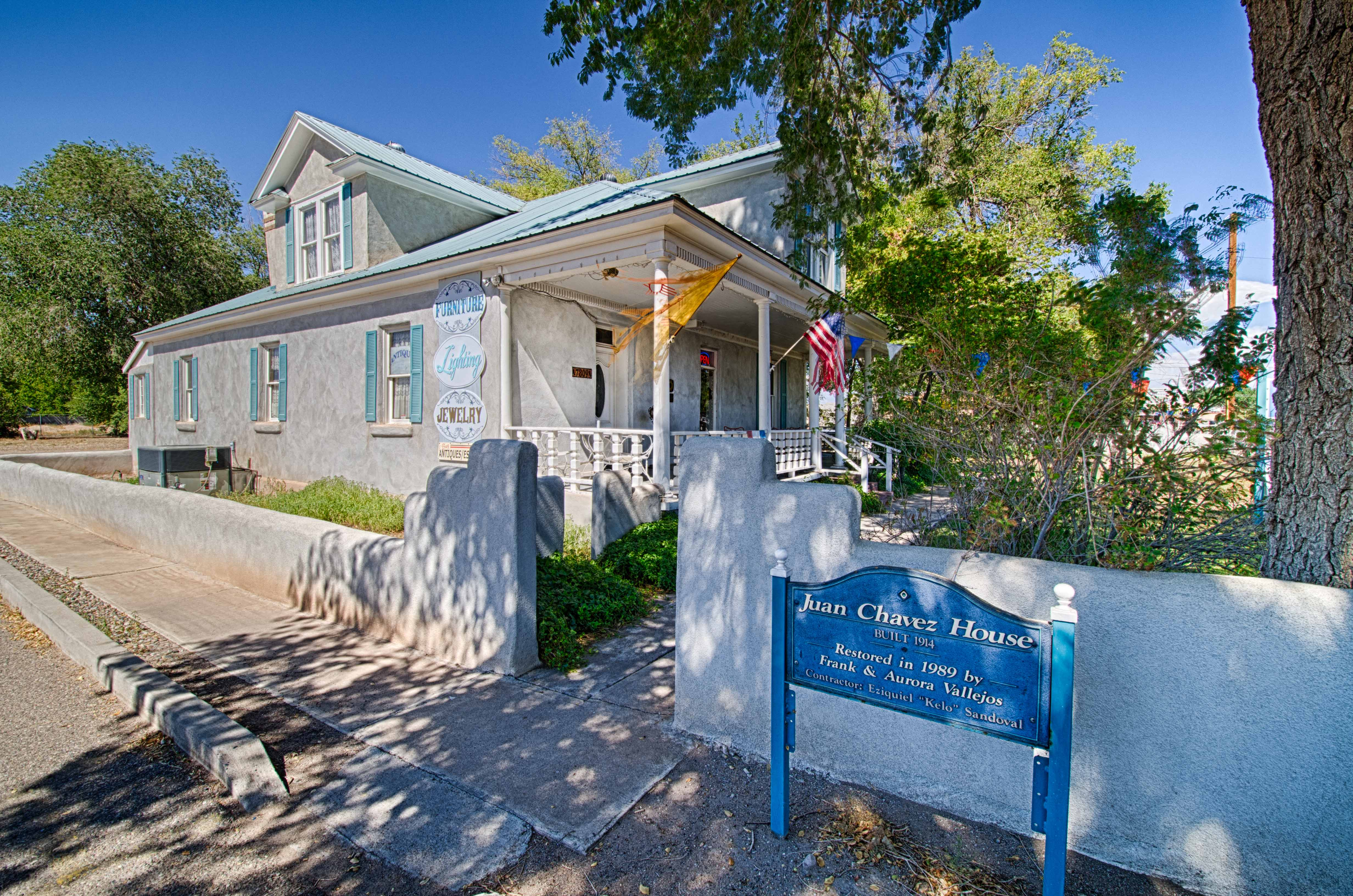
- The house in 2012

- Location within New Mexico
- Location: 7809 4th Street, NW, Los Ranchos de Albuquerque, New Mexico
- Coordinates: 35°09′46″N 106°38′04″W
- Area: less than one acre
- Built: 1916
- MPS: Albuquerque North Valley MRA
- NRHP reference No.: 84002849
- NMSRCP No.: 936

Significant dates
- Added to NRHP: February 9, 1984
- Designated NMSRCP: August 25, 1983

The Juan Chavez House is a historic two-story terrone house in Los Ranchos de Albuquerque, New Mexico. It was built in 1914-1917 by Juan Chavez, a native of San Acacia, New Mexico who lived here with his wife Candelaria and their nine children. Half of the first floor was a grocery, out of which the family sold produce. Chavez also worked for a liquor wholesaler, Stern, Schloss and Company. During prohibition, which lasted from 1920 to 1933, he stored bootlegged alcohol in the upstairs bedroom. In 1948, the house was purchased by Louis Gross and his wife, Leona. He sold fruit, vegetables, and his own wine, made in Bernalillo, New Mexico. The house was later inherited by his son, Louis W. Gross. Wilhelmina (Billie) Gross, wife of Louis W. Gross, was instrumental in getting the house listed on the New Mexico State Register of Cultural Properties in 1983 and the National Register of Historic Places in 1984. The house was remodelled as a hair salon by Frank Vallejos in 1989.
