= Pacific Building (Albuquerque, New Mexico) =

- U.S. National Register of Historic Places
- NM State Register of Cultural Properties
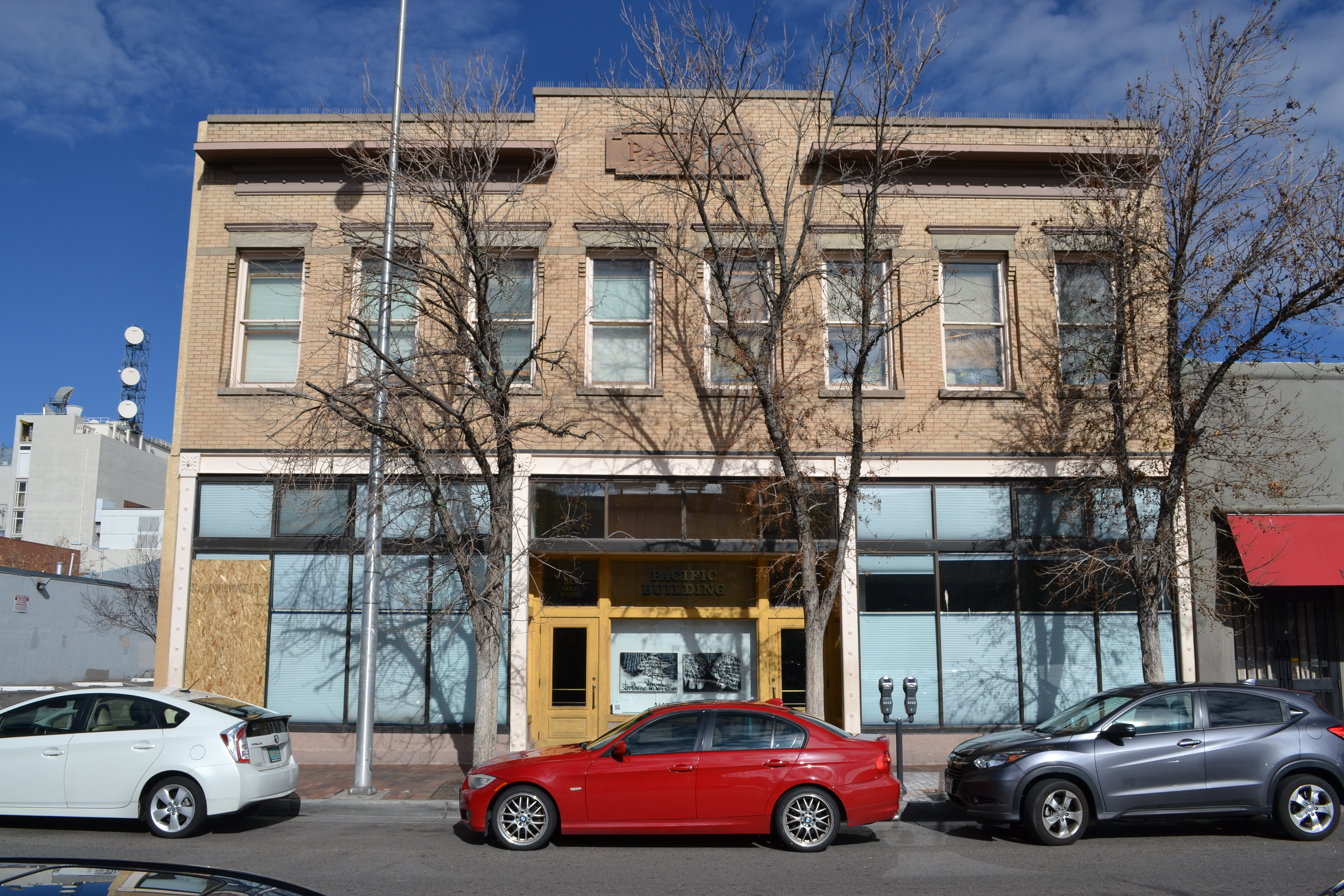
- Pacific Building, January 2017

- Location within New Mexico Location within the United States
- Location: 213–15 Gold Ave. SW, Albuquerque, New Mexico
- Coordinates: 35°05′00″N 106°38′58″W
- Built: 1914
- NRHP reference No.: 80002545
- NMSRCP No.: 772

Significant dates
- Added to NRHP: September 30, 1980
- Designated NMSRCP: July 25, 1980

The Pacific Building, also known as the Pacific Desk Building, is a historic building in Albuquerque, New Mexico. Built in 1914, it is notable as a well-preserved example of early 20th-century commercial architecture in Downtown Albuquerque and includes one of the only remaining cast iron storefronts in the central business district. The building was added to the New Mexico State Register of Cultural Properties and the National Register of Historic Places in 1980.

== History ==
The Pacific Building was built in 1914 by Andreas Romero, who also owned a butcher shop on the same block. The first tenant was a furniture store, followed by a car dealership from 1918 to 1922 and then a furniture store again. In 1942 the building was bought by the Pacific Desk Company, an office furniture retailer, which remained in business until 1980. Local investors bought the building in 1980 and renovated it as office space in 1981.

== Architecture ==
The Pacific Building is a two-story, rectangular building with a partial basement. The facade is yellow brick with a cast iron storefront, one of the few remaining in the city. The second floor has eight evenly spaced 1/1 sash windows under a pair of cast iron hoods and a stepped parapet. On the ground floor, there are large display windows on either side of a recessed entry. The interior of the building has an open first floor with cast iron columns and an ornate pressed metal ceiling. The second floor had removable partitions installed in the 1940s and was reported to be unused in the 1980s.
