= Hoffmantown Baptist Church =

Historic church in New Mexico, United States

- U.S. National Register of Historic Places
- NM State Register of Cultural Properties
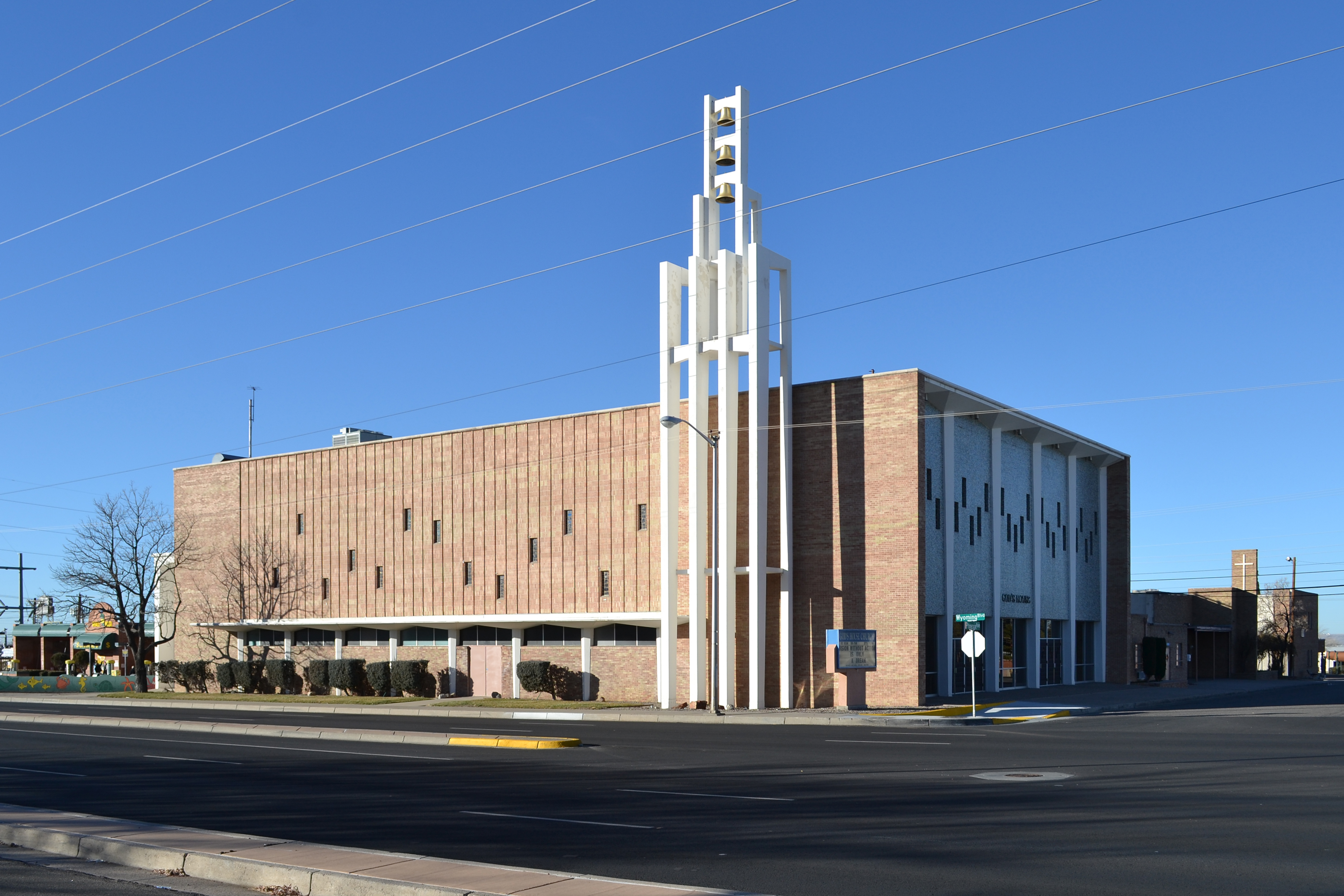
- The church in 2018

- Location within New Mexico
- Location: 2335 Wyoming Blvd. NE, Albuquerque, New Mexico
- Coordinates: 35°06′39″N 106°33′04″W
- Area: 1.23 acres (0.50 ha)
- Built: 1965
- Built by: Bradbury and Stamm
- Architect: Kruger, Lake and Henderson Associated Architects and Engineers
- Architectural style: New Formalism
- NRHP reference No.: 100004492
- NMSRCP No.: 2057

Significant dates
- Added to NRHP: October 25, 2019
- Designated NMSRCP: August 9, 2019

Hoffmantown Baptist Church is a historic church building in the Northeast Heights of Albuquerque, New Mexico, United States. The church was built in 1965 in the New Formalist architectural style. After being outgrown by its original congregation, the building has been home to God's House Church since 1997. It was listed on the New Mexico State Register of Cultural Properties and the National Register of Historic Places in 2019.

== History ==
Hoffmantown Baptist Church was established in 1953, and in that year built a one-story brick chapel. The church grew quickly, and built an addition in 1954, a fellowship hall in 1956; and an educational building in 1959. In 1965, Kruger, Lake and Henderson architects were commissioned to design a larger sanctuary with a capacity of 800. This is the building that is now listed on the National Register.

Hoffmantown Baptist Church kept growing, and began a television ministry in 1972 which continues, in 2019, to broadcast throughout New Mexico. During the early 1980s, membership grew to 2,200, and a capital campaign raised funds to build a new, larger church at Ventura and Harper Streets. This was built in 1986–87.

Separately, another Albuquerque church, God's House Church, originally named The House of God, was growing. It was founded in 1916, and built a new church on Arno Street in 1959. God's House Church purchased the entire Wyoming Blvd. campus of the Hoffmantown Baptist Church, and in 1997 opened at this location with 900 members.

== Architecture ==
The main sanctuary building was constructed in 1965, with New Formalist style, and is roughly three stories tall. Its north-facing main facade, on Phoenix Avenue, has six colossal tapered pilasters. The five bays of the facade are covered with a veneer of small blue tiles, and include vertically staggered windows. The longer east facade, along Wyoming Boulevard, has a similar pattern of windows and one-story pilasters which support a reinforced concrete brise soleil. The east side also has an open-frame bell tower which was built in three stages.

The church campus also includes four one- and-two-story plain brick buildings, which are the earlier buildings of the Hoffmantown Baptist Church built between 1953 and 1968. These are not included in the National Register listing.
