= Shoup Boarding House =

Historic building in New Mexico, United States

- U.S. National Register of Historic Places
- NM State Register of Cultural Properties
- Location within New Mexico Location within the United States
- Location: 707 1st St. SW, Albuquerque, New Mexico
- Coordinates: 35°4′40″N 106°38′56″W
- Built: c. 1890
- NRHP reference No.: 83001618
- NMSRCP No.: 791

Significant dates
- Added to NRHP: February 17, 1983
- Designated NMSRCP: October 31, 1980

The Shoup Boarding House was a historic boarding house in the Barelas neighborhood of Albuquerque, New Mexico. It was probably built between 1886 and 1891, a period when the recent completion of the railroad brought a great deal of economic activity, and consequent need for new housing, to the city. Joseph Shoup (c. 1858–1938) ran the rooming house until 1932, and it remained in operation at the time of its National Register of Historic Places listing in 1983. It was the oldest surviving boarding house in the city. It was also listed on the New Mexico State Register of Cultural Properties in 1980. The building was demolished before 1991.

The boarding house was a two-story, T-shaped building consisting of two distinct sections. The front section was constructed from brick, with a truncated hip roof and a large porch with Queen Anne trim. The rear wing was of frame construction, with a gable roof and several closely spaced doors and windows. The building contained nine rooms on the ground floor and 17 on the second floor.
