= Cottage Bakery =

- Hausammann Brewhaus
- U.S. National Register of Historic Places
- NM State Register of Cultural Properties
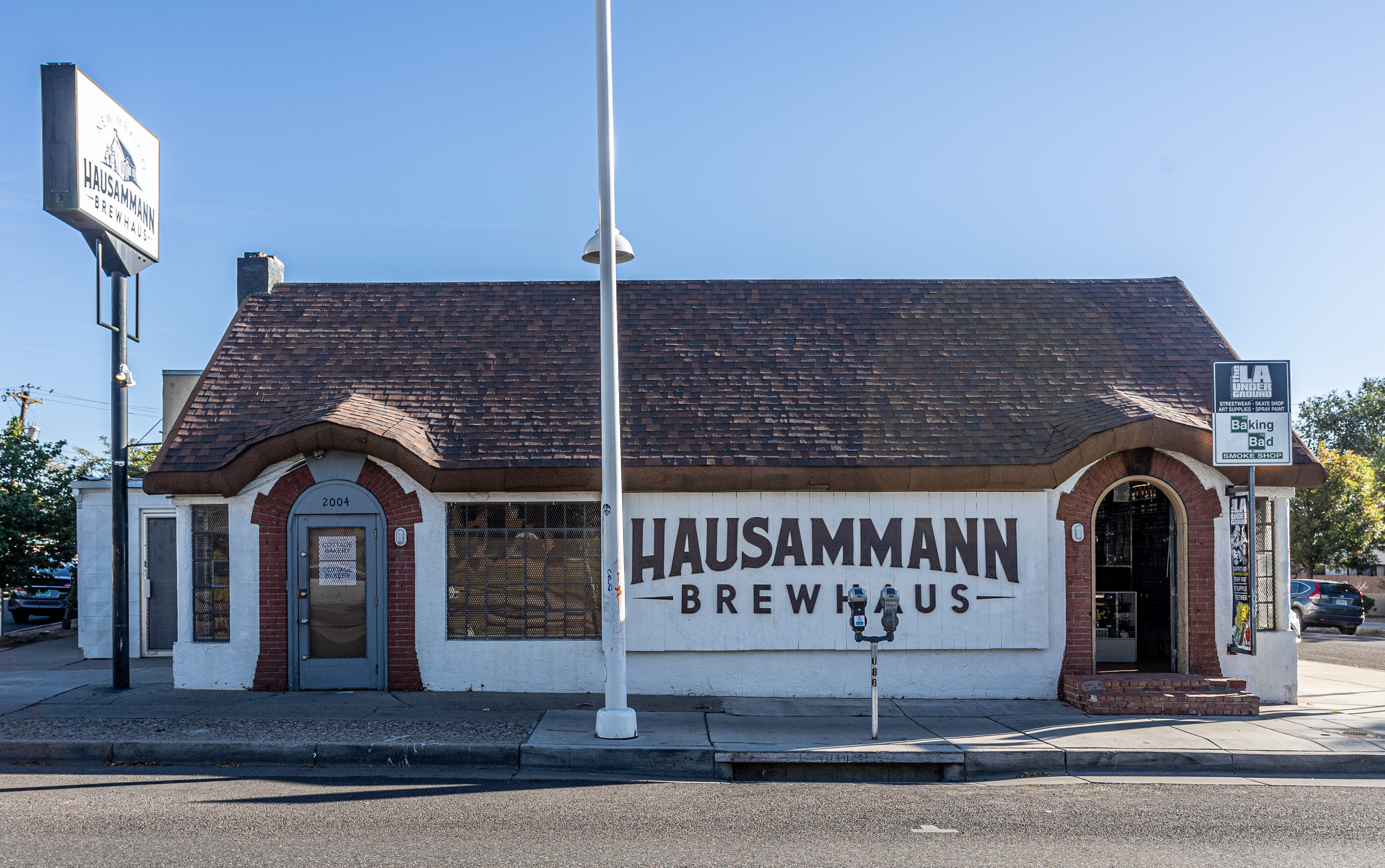
- The building in 2024

- Location within New Mexico Location within the United States
- Location: 2000–2004 Central Ave. SE, Albuquerque, New Mexico
- Coordinates: 35.080895°N 106.624206°W
- Built: 1937
- NRHP reference No.: 93001218
- NMSRCP No.: 1567

Significant dates
- Added to NRHP: November 22, 1993
- Designated NMSRCP: September 17, 1993

The Hausammann Brewhaus, formerly the Cottage Bakery, is a historic building on Central Avenue (former U.S. Route 66) in Albuquerque, New Mexico.

== Description and history ==
It was built in 1937 by a local bakery, the Cottage Pure Food Shoppe, and is significant as a relatively unaltered 1930s food-vending establishment, as well as for its use of roadside novelty architecture to attract customers. The front of the building was constructed in the form of a thatched cottage, which was intended to evoke "a bucolic purity that clients would associate with dairy and bakery products". It was listed on the New Mexico State Register of Cultural Properties and the National Register of Historic Places in 1993.

In May 2024, the Cottage Bakery was operating as the Hausammann Brewhaus.

The front section of the building is a one-story, side-gabled brick building with two eyebrow arches that give it the appearance of a thatched roof. It has two separate storefronts, each with multi-light corner windows and an arched doorway with brick trim. The eastern section of the building (2004 Central) originally housed the retail outlet of the Cottage bakery, while the Spot Ice Cream Company was located next door at 2000 Central. Behind the cottage is a larger, more utilitarian one-story cinder block section which housed the commercial baking plant.

== Gallery ==
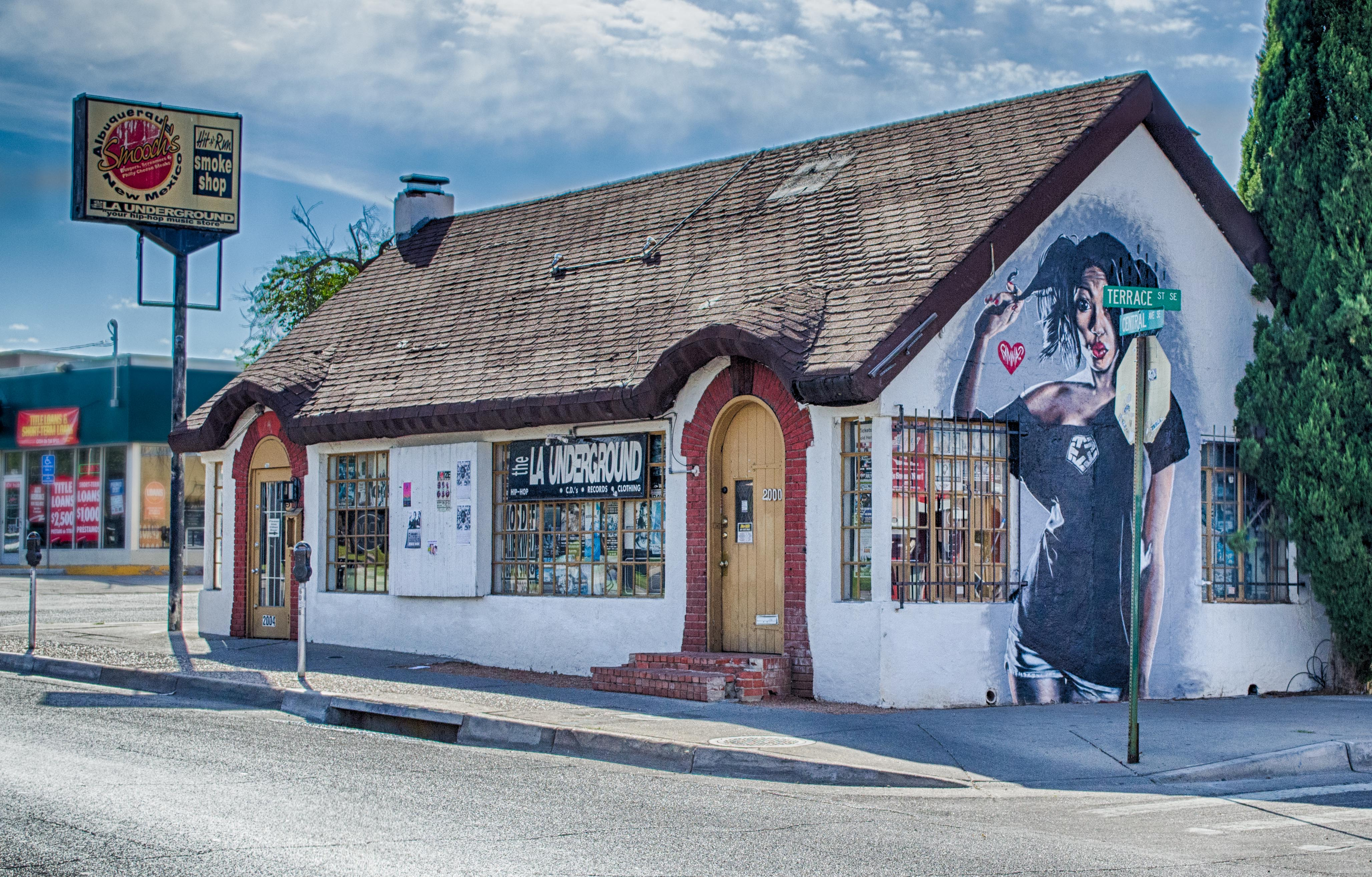
2012: Cottage Bakery

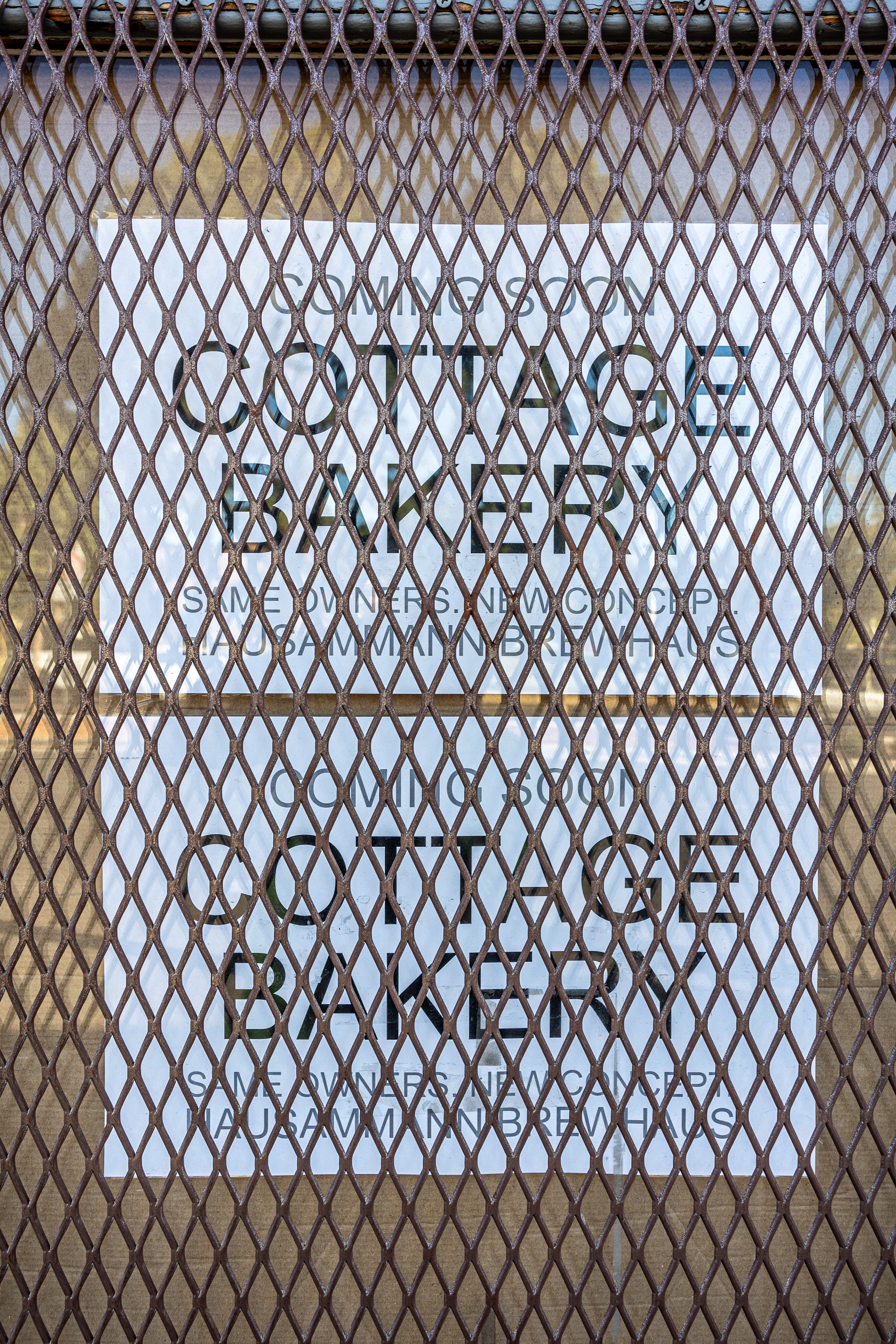
2024: Same owners new concept: Hausammann Brewhaus
