= Medical Arts Historic District =

- U.S. National Register of Historic Places
- U.S. Historic district
- NM State Register of Cultural Properties
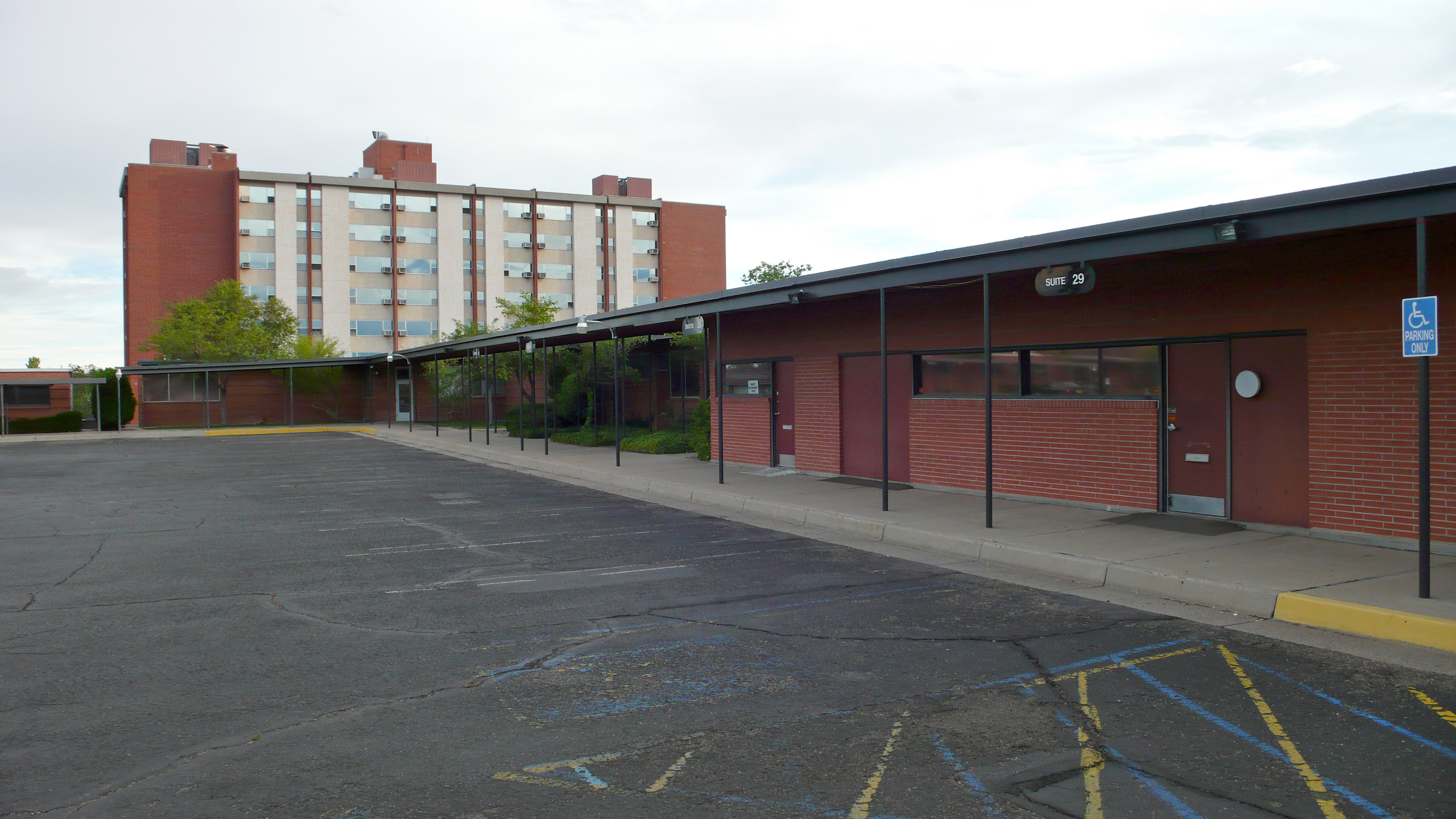
- Encino Medical Plaza in 2010

- Location within New Mexico Location within the United States
- Location: 711, 717, and 801 Encino Place NE and 1010 Las Lomas Boulevard NE; Albuquerque, New Mexico
- Coordinates: 35°5′24″N 106°37′55″W
- Built: 1950–1968
- Architectural style: International Style, New Formalism
- NRHP reference No.: 100009505
- NMSRCP No.: 2080

Significant dates
- Added to NRHP: January 2, 2024
- Designated NMSRCP: August 11, 2023

The Medical Arts Historic District is a historic district in northeast Albuquerque, New Mexico, consisting of four adjacent medical office complexes: Medical Arts Square (1950), Encino Medical Plaza (1955), Encino Crescent (1965), and Granada Medical Plaza (1968). The complexes reflect the movement of medical professionals in the mid-20th century away from downtown office buildings and into more suburban settings with onsite parking. Each complex consists of one-story buildings organized around a central parking areas, similar to a suburban shopping center. The Granada Medical Plaza was designed in the New Formalist style, while the other three complexes are examples of International Style architecture.

The district was added to the New Mexico State Register of Cultural Properties in 2023 and the National Register of Historic Places in 2024.
