= Holy Child Church =

Historic church in New Mexico, United States

- U.S. National Register of Historic Places
- NM State Register of Cultural Properties
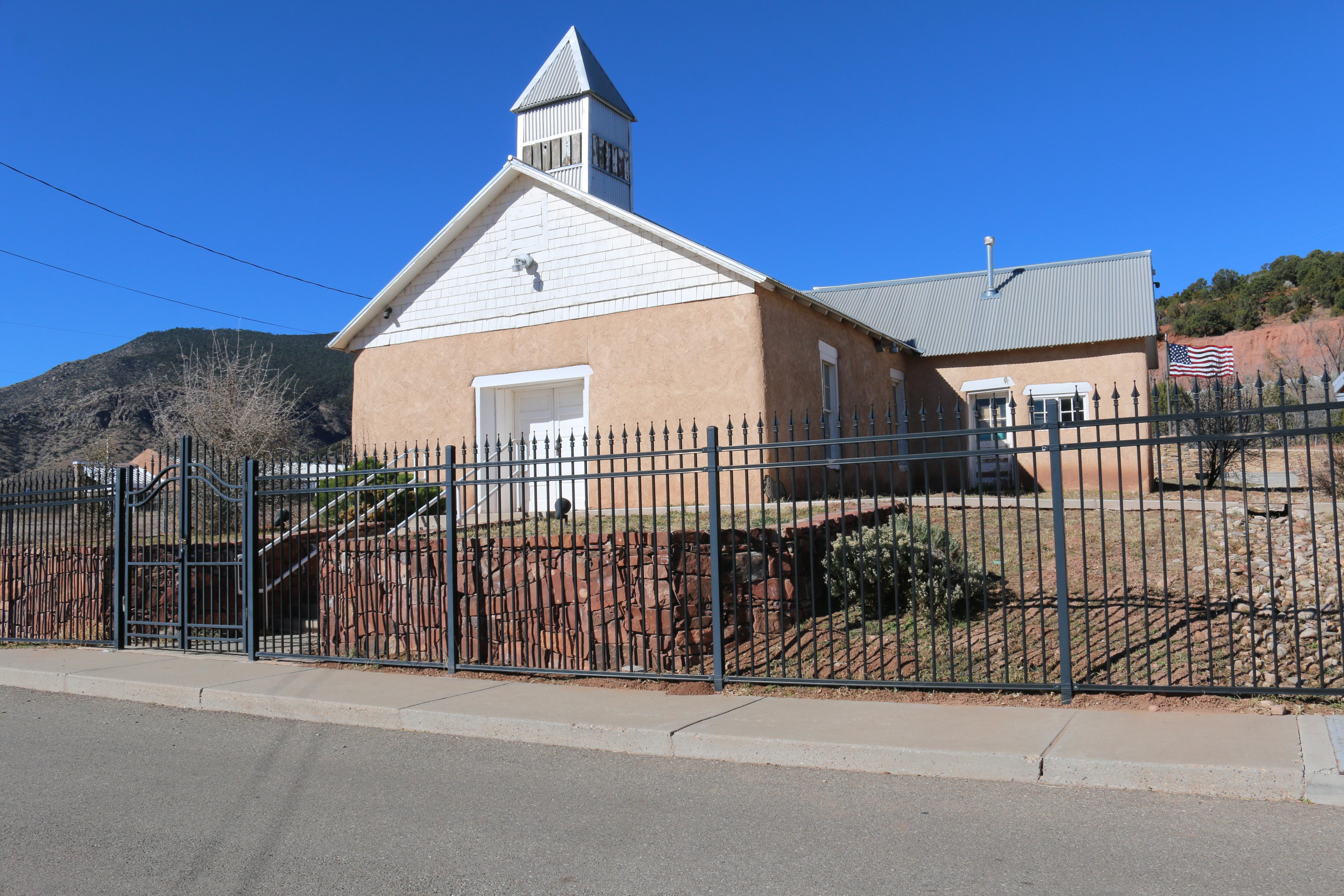

- Location within New Mexico Location within the United States
- Location: Off I-40, Tijeras, New Mexico
- Coordinates: 35°4′47″N 106°23′23″W
- Area: 3.2 acres (1.3 ha)
- Built: 1912
- NRHP reference No.: 78001810
- NMSRCP No.: 511

Significant dates
- Added to NRHP: March 8, 1978
- Designated NMSRCP: July 15, 1977

Holy Child Church is a historic church off I-40 in Tijeras, New Mexico.

It was built in 1912 and added to the National Register of Historic Places in 1978.
