= C. M. Foraker Farmhouse =

Historic house in New Mexico, United States

- U.S. National Register of Historic Places
- NM State Register of Cultural Properties
- Location within New Mexico Location within the United States
- Location: 905 Menaul Blvd. NW, Albuquerque, New Mexico
- Coordinates: 35°6′46″N 106°39′12″W
- Built: c. 1900
- NRHP reference No.: 84002858
- NMSRCP No.: 945

Significant dates
- Added to NRHP: February 9, 1984
- Designated NMSRCP: August 25, 1983

The C. M. Foraker Farmhouse was a historic house in the Near North Valley neighborhood of Albuquerque, New Mexico. It was built near the turn of the 20th century and was purchased around 1900 by C. M. Foraker, the last U.S. Marshal for New Mexico Territory before New Mexico gained statehood in 1912. Foraker's daughter Mary still owned the house at the time of its National Register of Historic Places listing in 1984. It was also listed on the New Mexico State Register of Cultural Properties in 1983.

In 2005, the farmhouse was listed as one of the most endangered historic places in New Mexico. It burned down in March, 2008.

The house, a notable early example of an "Anglo" style house in the predominantly Hispanic North Valley, was a one-and-a-half-story building of terron (sod brick) and frame construction. The main body of the house was rectangular, with two projecting wings at the rear. One of these wings was original and the other was added in 1926. The house had a tall hip roof with dormers on all four sides and a screened porch with original turned wooden posts. The house also retained original wooden 1-over-1 sash windows and interior trim.
