= Los Candelarias Chapel =

Historic church in New Mexico, United States

- U.S. National Register of Historic Places
- NM State Register of Cultural Properties
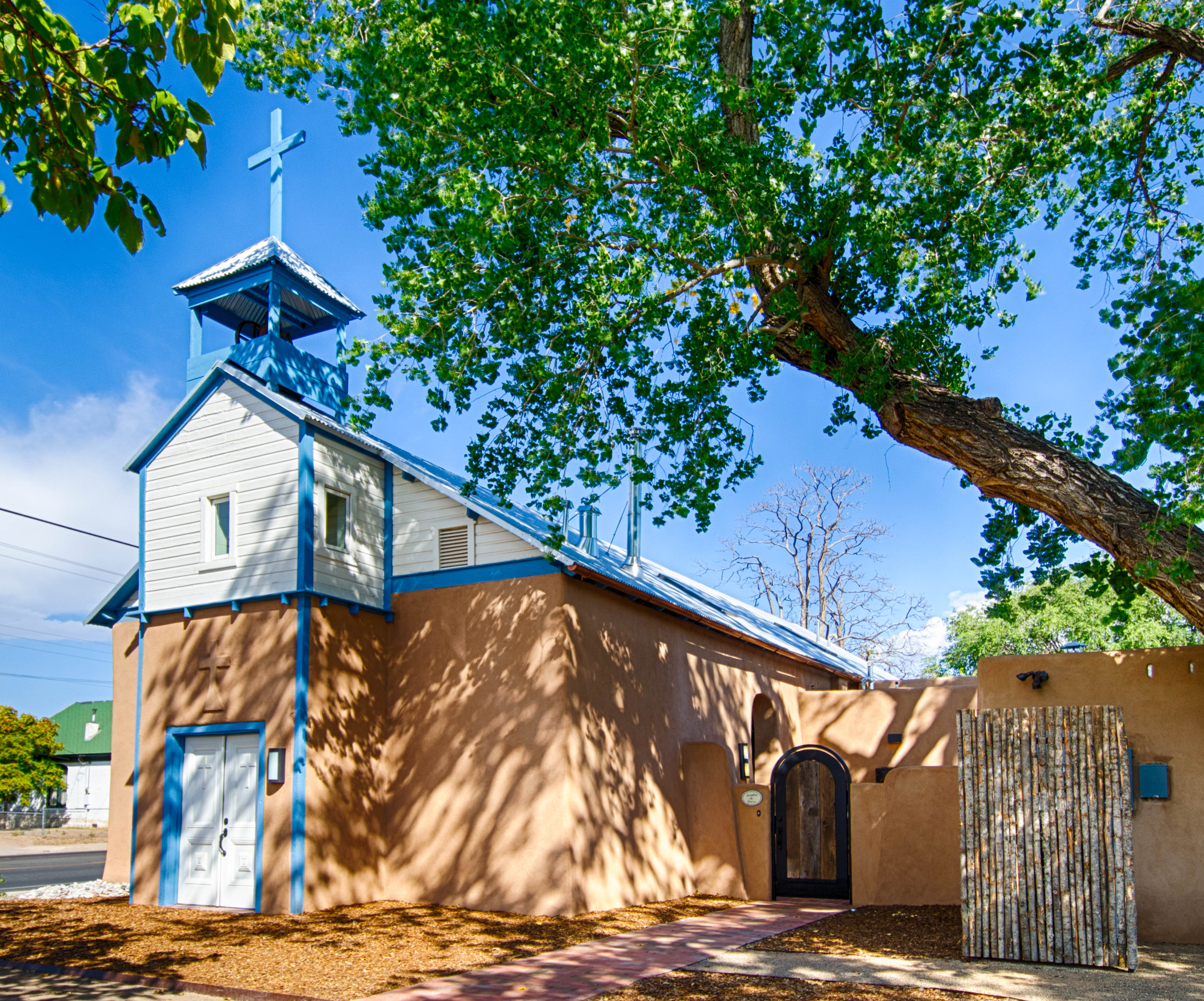
- The chapel in 2012

- Location within New Mexico Location within the United States
- Location: 1934 Candelaria Rd. NW; Albuquerque, New Mexico
- Coordinates: 35°7′17″N 106°40′0″W
- Built: 1888
- Architectural style: New Mexico vernacular, Territorial
- NRHP reference No.: 84002844
- NMSRCP No.: 932

Significant dates
- Added to NRHP: February 9, 1984
- Designated NMSRCP: August 25, 1983

The Los Candelarias Chapel, also known as the San Antonio Chapel, is a historic building in Albuquerque, New Mexico. The chapel was built in 1888 to serve the community of Los Candelarias, one of several outlying plazas spread along the Rio Grande in the vicinity of the main plaza at Old Town Albuquerque. It is one of the only surviving buildings from the no-longer-extant plaza. The building remained in use as a chapel until the 1950s and was subsequently converted into an artist's studio and then a private residence. It was listed on the New Mexico State Register of Cultural Properties in 1983 and the National Register of Historic Places in 1984.

The chapel is a tall, one-story adobe building in the New Mexico vernacular style with some Territorial details. It is rectangular in plan and proportioned similarly to the traditional Spanish colonial churches, about four times as long as it is wide. The building has a corrugated metal gable roof and a projecting tower topped with a belfry and a cross. The walls are stuccoed except for the gable ends and the upper section of the bell tower, which are covered in clapboard siding. The main entrance has a set of wooden double doors with carved details underneath a stuccoed cross in relief.
