= Tower Court =

- U.S. National Register of Historic Places
- NM State Register of Cultural Properties
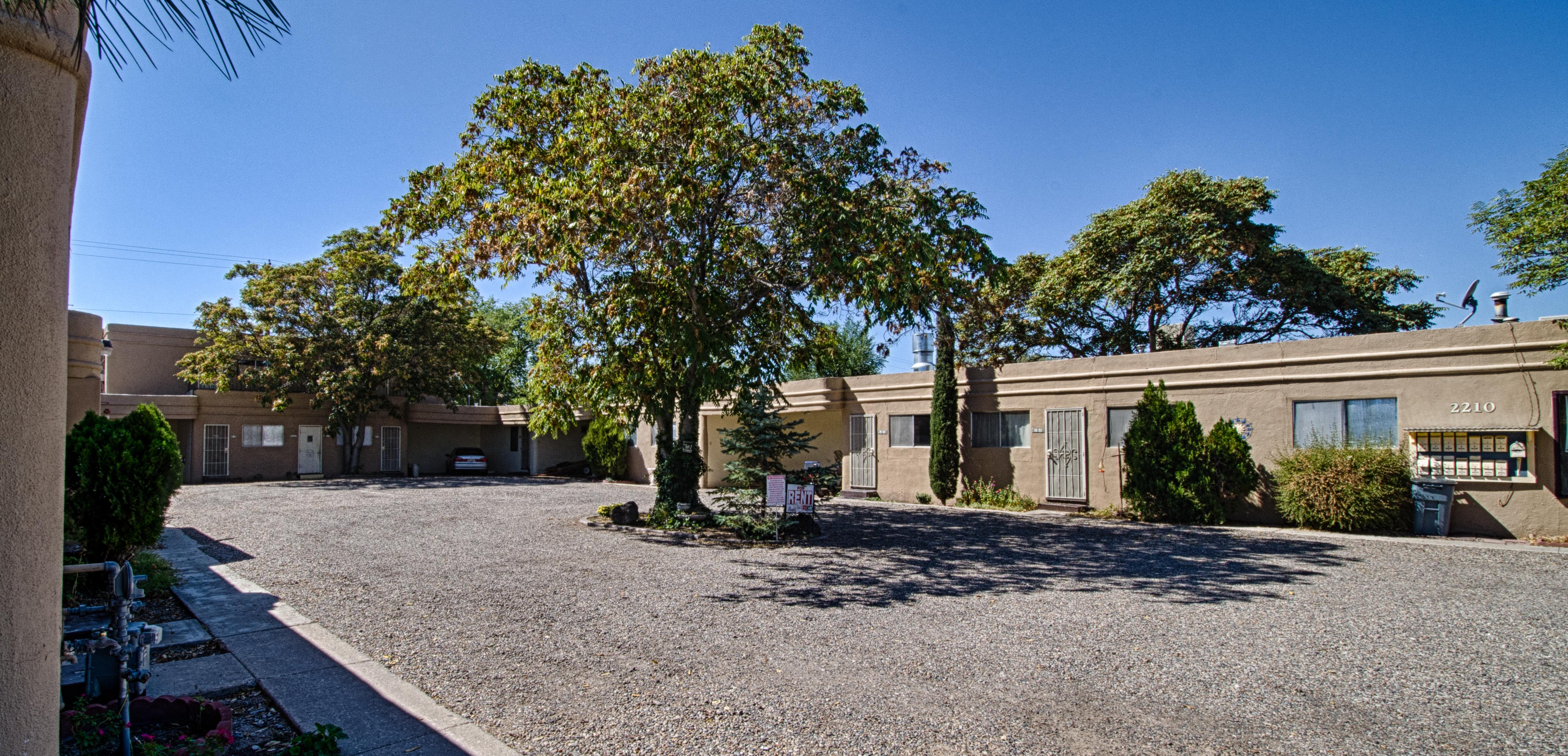
- The building in 2012

- Location within New Mexico Location within the United States
- Location: 2210 Central Ave. SW, Albuquerque, New Mexico
- Coordinates: 35°5′42″N 106°40′26″W
- Built: 1939
- Architectural style: Streamline Moderne
- NRHP reference No.: 93001216
- NMSRCP No.: 1573

Significant dates
- Added to NRHP: November 22, 1993
- Designated NMSRCP: September 17, 1993

The Tower Court (Note: The property is listed in the NRHP as the Tower Courts; however, contemporary sources including photos, postcards, and advertisements gave the name as Tower Court.) is a historic motel on Central Avenue (former U.S. Route 66) in Albuquerque, New Mexico. It is notable as one of only a few 1930s motels remaining in the city. The motel was built in 1939 by Ben F. Shear and was added to the New Mexico State Register of Cultural Properties and the National Register of Historic Places in 1993.

The motel is a U-shaped, flat-roofed building with 16 units surrounding a central parking area. It is one story high except for the central section, which has two units on the second floor reached by an interior staircase. The exterior walls are stuccoed and include modest Streamline Moderne elements like rounded corners and horizontal decorative moldings. The front of the property originally included a 30-foot (9.1 m) stepped tower which was the motel's namesake, but it has been removed.
