= Five Points Community Church =

- U.S. National Register of Historic Places
- NM State Register of Cultural Properties
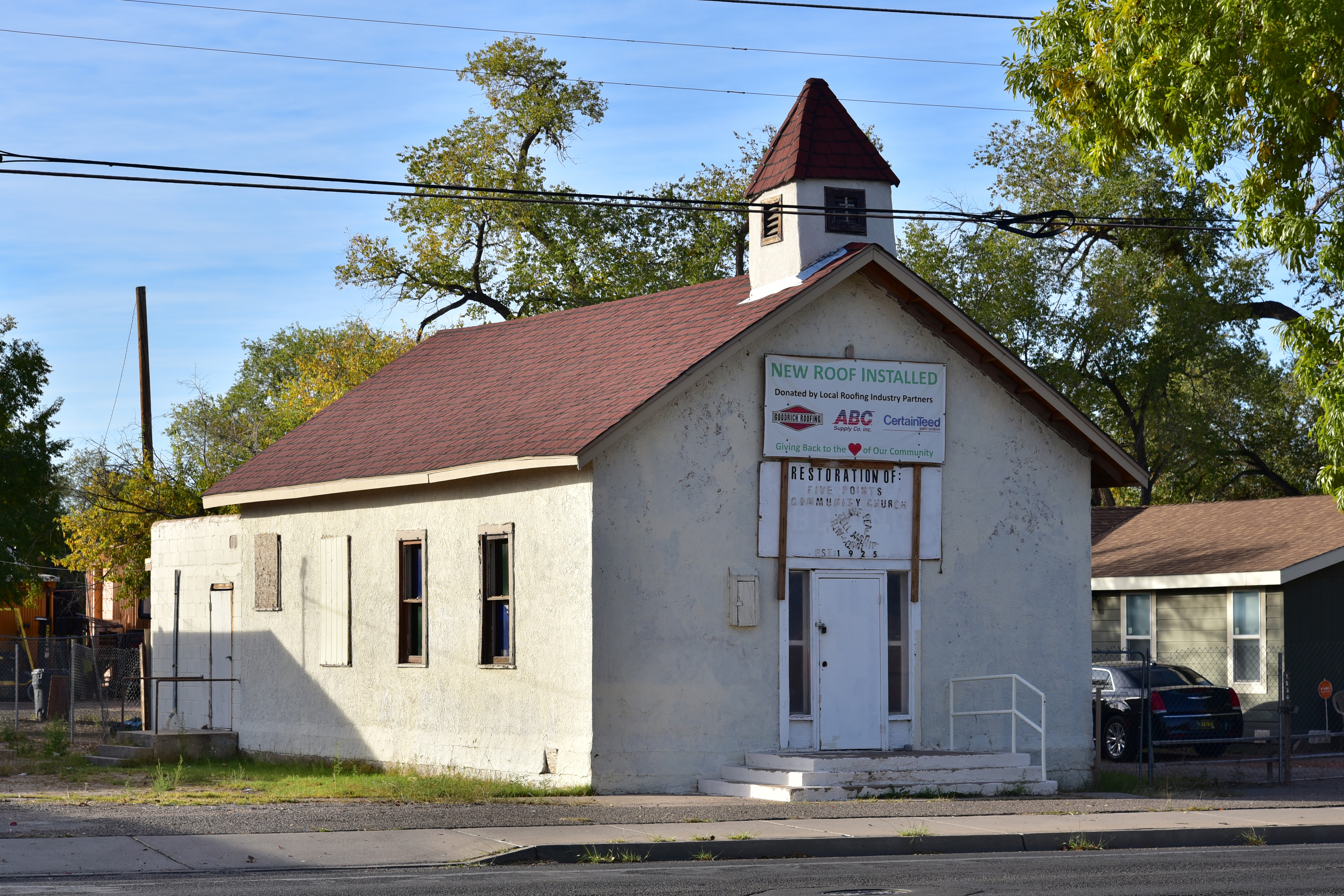
- The church in 2025

- Location within New Mexico Location within the United States
- Location: 1534 Bridge Blvd. SW; Albuquerque, New Mexico
- Coordinates: 35°3′58″N 106°40′33″W
- Built: 1925
- NRHP reference No.: 100010498
- NMSRCP No.: 2083

Significant dates
- Added to NRHP: July 1, 2024
- Designated NMSRCP: April 26, 2024

Five Points Community Church is a historic building in the Atrisco neighborhood of Albuquerque, New Mexico. It opened as a non-denominational church in 1925, then was sold to a Baptist congregation in 1989. The building was listed on the New Mexico State Register of Cultural Properties and the National Register of Historic Places in 2024.
