= La Puerta Lodge =

- U.S. National Register of Historic Places
- NM State Register of Cultural Properties
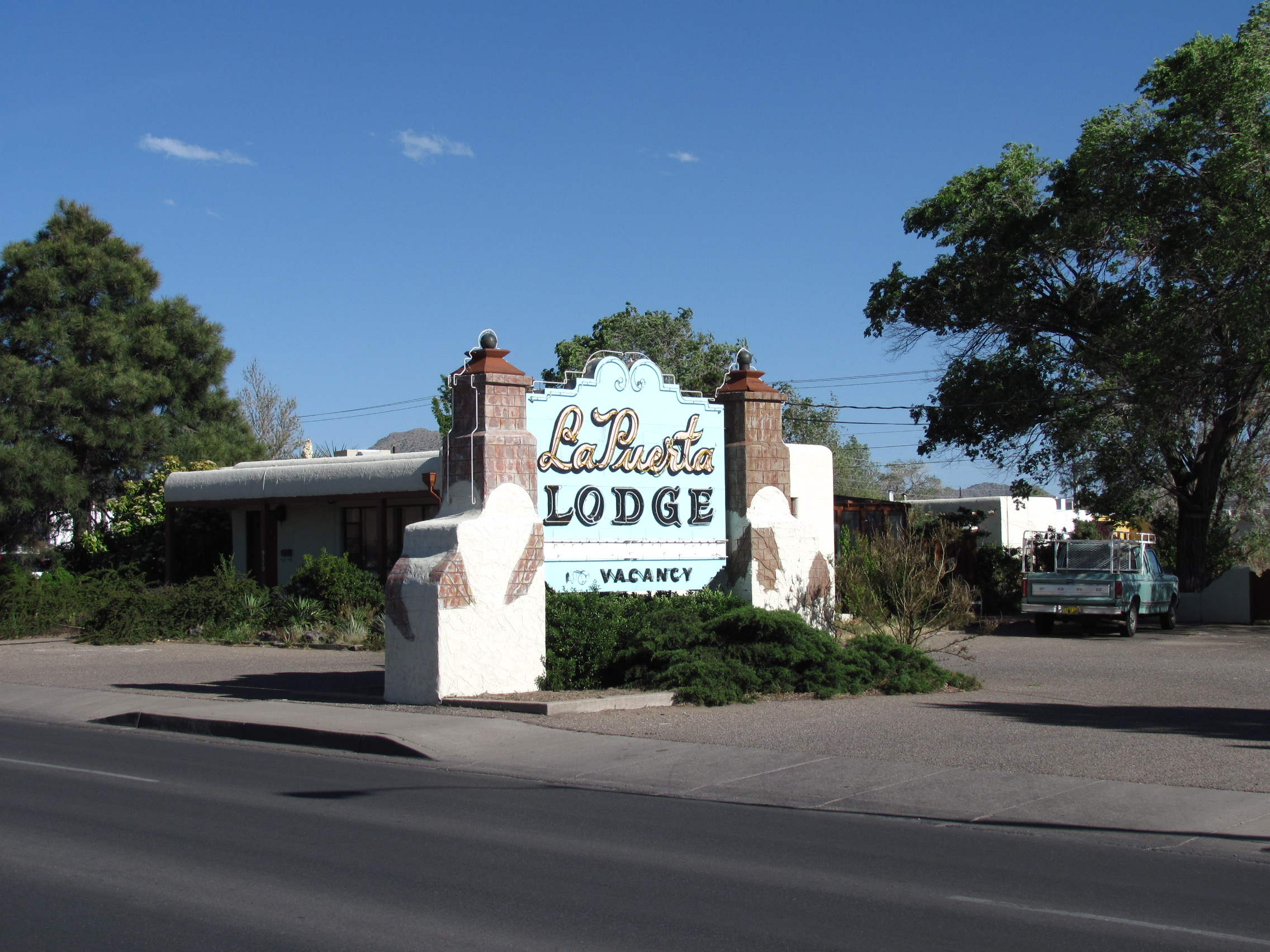
- The motel in 2010

- Location within New Mexico Location within the United States
- Location: 9710 Central Ave. SE, Albuquerque, New Mexico
- Coordinates: 35.072547°N 106.540106°W
- Area: Less than one acre
- Built: 1949
- Architect: Ralph Smith
- Architectural style: Southwest Vernacular
- NRHP reference No.: 97001596
- NMSRCP No.: 1681

Significant dates
- Added to NRHP: January 9, 1998
- Designated NMSRCP: May 9, 1997

The La Puerta Lodge is a historic motel on Central Avenue (former U.S. Route 66) in Albuquerque, New Mexico, which is notable as one of the best-preserved Route 66 era motels remaining in the city. It was built in 1949 by Ralph Smith and was one of the easternmost Albuquerque motels, located over 6 miles (9.7 km) from the city center. The property was added to the New Mexico State Register of Cultural Properties in 1997 and the National Register of Historic Places in 1998.

The motel consists of three one-story buildings with Pueblo Revival elements. The building on the west side of the property is long and narrow, containing eight motel rooms interspersed with covered parking spaces. A continuous portal (portico) supported by wooden columns with ornamental woodwork extends the full length of the building. There is also an ornately carved wooden door (the titular la puerta) on the front corner facing Central Avenue. The building to the east is a small office and manager's residence, and there is another small residential building at the rear of the property.

As of 2024, the City of Albuquerque described La Puerta Motor Lodge as permanently closed, with noticeable degradation.
