= Felipe Romero House =

Historic house in New Mexico, United States

- U.S. National Register of Historic Places
- NM State Register of Cultural Properties
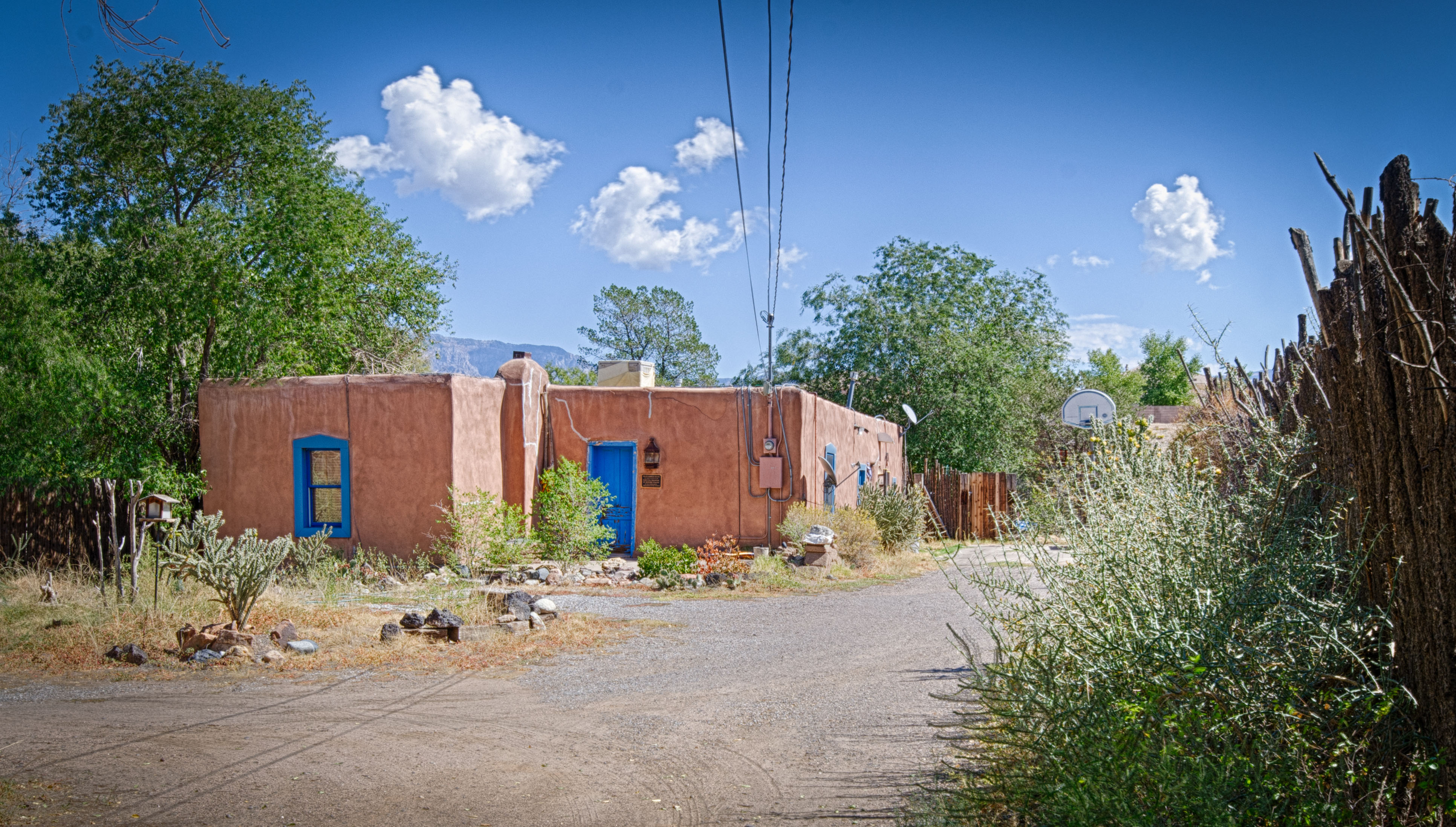
- The house in 2012

- Location within New Mexico Location within the United States
- Location: 7522 Edith Blvd. NE, Albuquerque, New Mexico
- Coordinates: 35°09′55″N 106°37′03″W
- Built: c. 1900
- Architectural style: Territorial
- NRHP reference No.: 84002885
- NMSRCP No.: 935

Significant dates
- Added to NRHP: February 9, 1984
- Designated NMSRCP: August 25, 1983

The Felipe Romero House is a historic farmhouse in Albuquerque, New Mexico. It was probably built around 1900, and was expanded to its present size around 1904 by Felipe Romero. Romero, who came from an old New Mexico family, bought the property after his house lower in the Rio Grande valley was destroyed by a flood in 1903. The building was added to the New Mexico State Register of Cultural Properties in 1983 and the National Register of Historic Places in 1984.

The house is an example of late Territorial Style architecture, with thick walls constructed from terrones (large adobe bricks) and a flat roof supported by vigas. It has five rooms grouped into two staggered rectangular volumes. The older part of the house, on the south side, has a higher floor level and contains the kitchen and bathroom, both with exterior entrances. The house has narrow door and window openings with 2-over-2 sash windows and simple wooden trim. There is also a detached horno at the rear of the house.
