= Enchanted Mesa Trading Post =

- U.S. National Register of Historic Places
- NM State Register of Cultural Properties
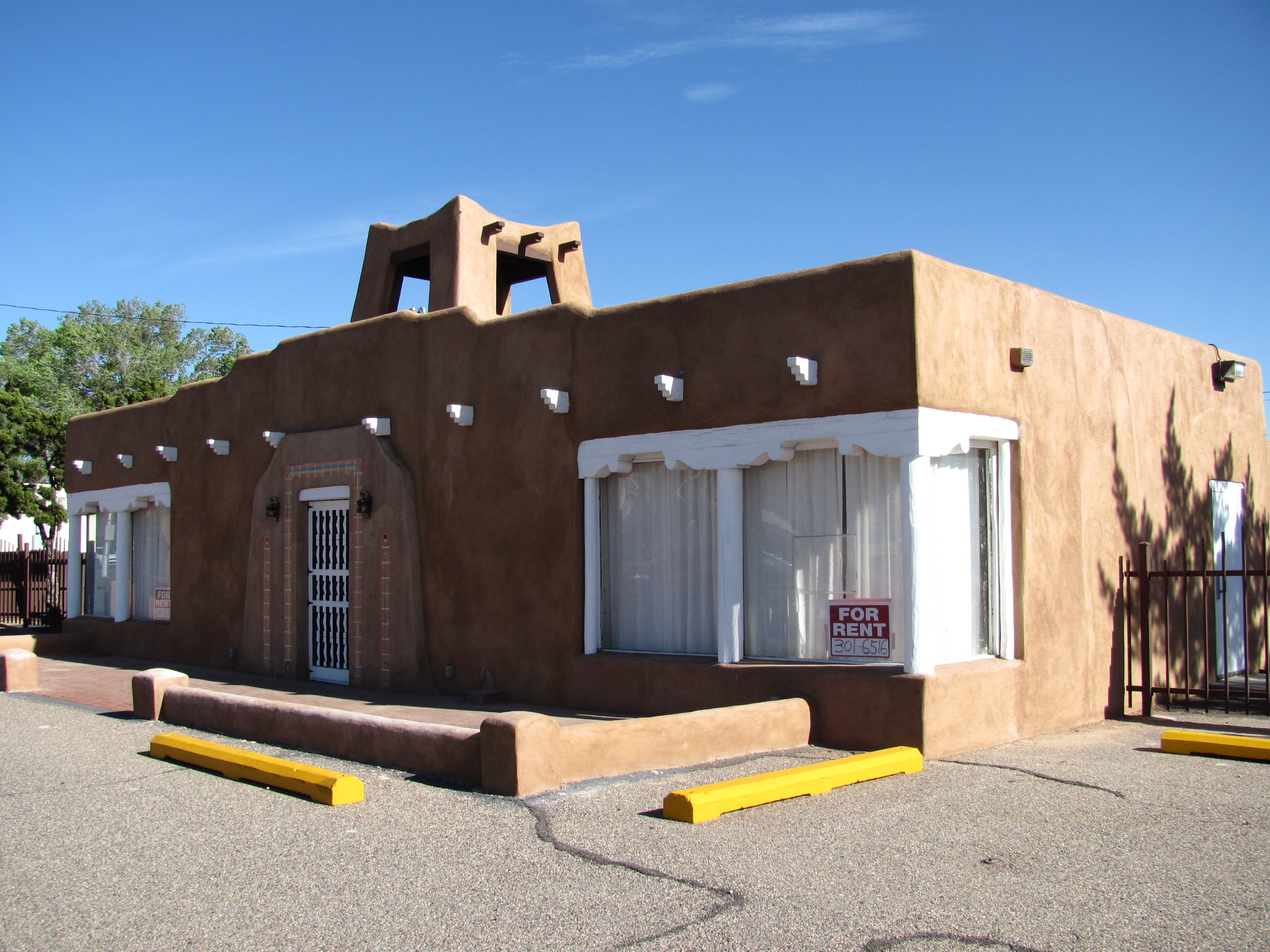

- Location within New Mexico Location within the United States
- Location: 9612 Central Ave. SE., Albuquerque, New Mexico
- Coordinates: 35°4′15″N 106°32′25″W
- Area: less than one acre
- Built: 1948
- Architect: Chase, Margarete; Hill, John (architects and/or builders)
- Architectural style: Mission/Spanish Revival, Pueblo
- MPS: Route 66 through New Mexico MPS
- NRHP reference No.: 97001595
- NMSRCP No.: 1680

Significant dates
- Added to NRHP: January 9, 1998
- Designated NMSRCP: May 9, 1997

The Enchanted Mesa Trading Post at 9612 Central Ave. SE. in Albuquerque, New Mexico, was built in 1948. It was a work of Margarete Chase and it was a work of a John Hill. It was listed on the New Mexico State Register of Cultural Properties in 1997 and the National Register of Historic Places in 1998.

Some portion of it was available for rent, in 2010.

== See also ==
- Silver City Water Works Building, Silver City, New Mexico, also NRHP-listed and a work of a John Hill, though dating from 1886
