= Samuel Shalit House =

Historic house in New Mexico, United States

- U.S. National Register of Historic Places
- NM State Register of Cultural Properties
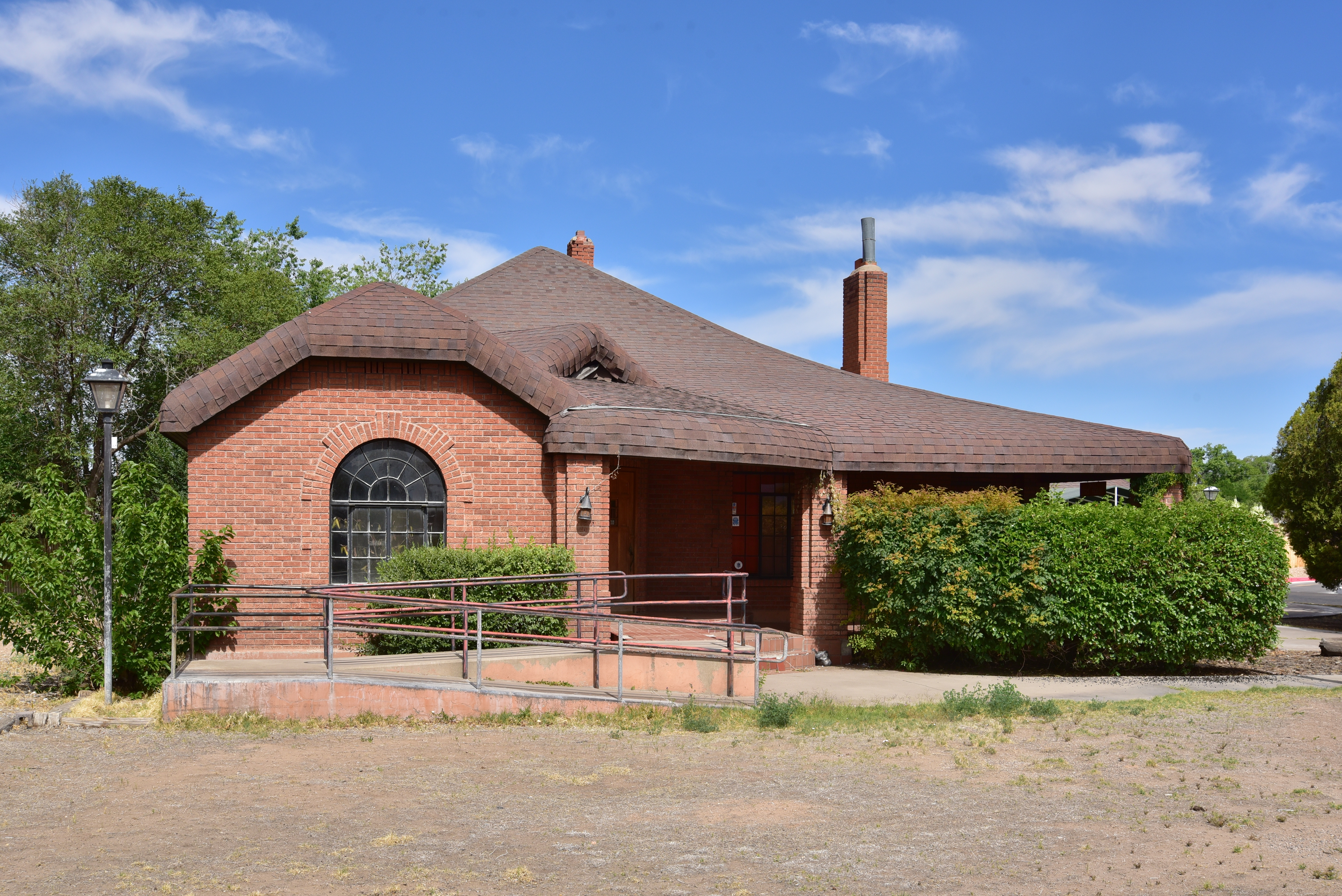
- The house in 2025

- Location within New Mexico Location within the United States
- Location: 5209 4th St. NW, Albuquerque, New Mexico
- Coordinates: 35°8′6″N 106°38′30″W
- Built: 1936
- Architectural style: English Cottage
- NRHP reference No.: 84002888
- NMSRCP No.: 947

Significant dates
- Added to NRHP: February 9, 1984
- Designated NMSRCP: August 25, 1983

The Samuel Shalit House is a historic house in the North Valley area of Albuquerque, New Mexico. The house is a well executed example of the English Cottage style, which is not commonly found in New Mexico, and has distinctive features such as patterned brick, a faux thatched roof, and notably tall chimneys. It was built in 1936 by Samuel Shalit (1893–1962), a Russian Jewish immigrant who accumulated substantial real estate holdings in the North Valley. The property was listed on the New Mexico State Register of Cultural Properties in 1983 and the National Register of Historic Places in 1984. In 1984, the house was converted from a private residence into a restaurant, Mr. Powdrell's Barbeque House, preserving much of the interior. Powdrell's closed in 2024 after 40 years in business.

The interior features original hardwood floors, decorative tile work, arched cabinet doors, and a brass ceiling fixture. The house is one story high and constructed from uniquely patterned red brick. The roofline is complex, consisting of a hip roof with two clipped gables, a diagonal Dutch gable, and a half-hipped dormer. The edges of the roof are rounded off to emulate thatching. The building also features boxed soffits, casement windows, some with semicircular fanlights, and a wrap-around porch with wrought-iron balustrades.
