= J. R. Willis House and La Miradora Apartments =

- U.S. National Register of Historic Places
- NM State Register of Cultural Properties
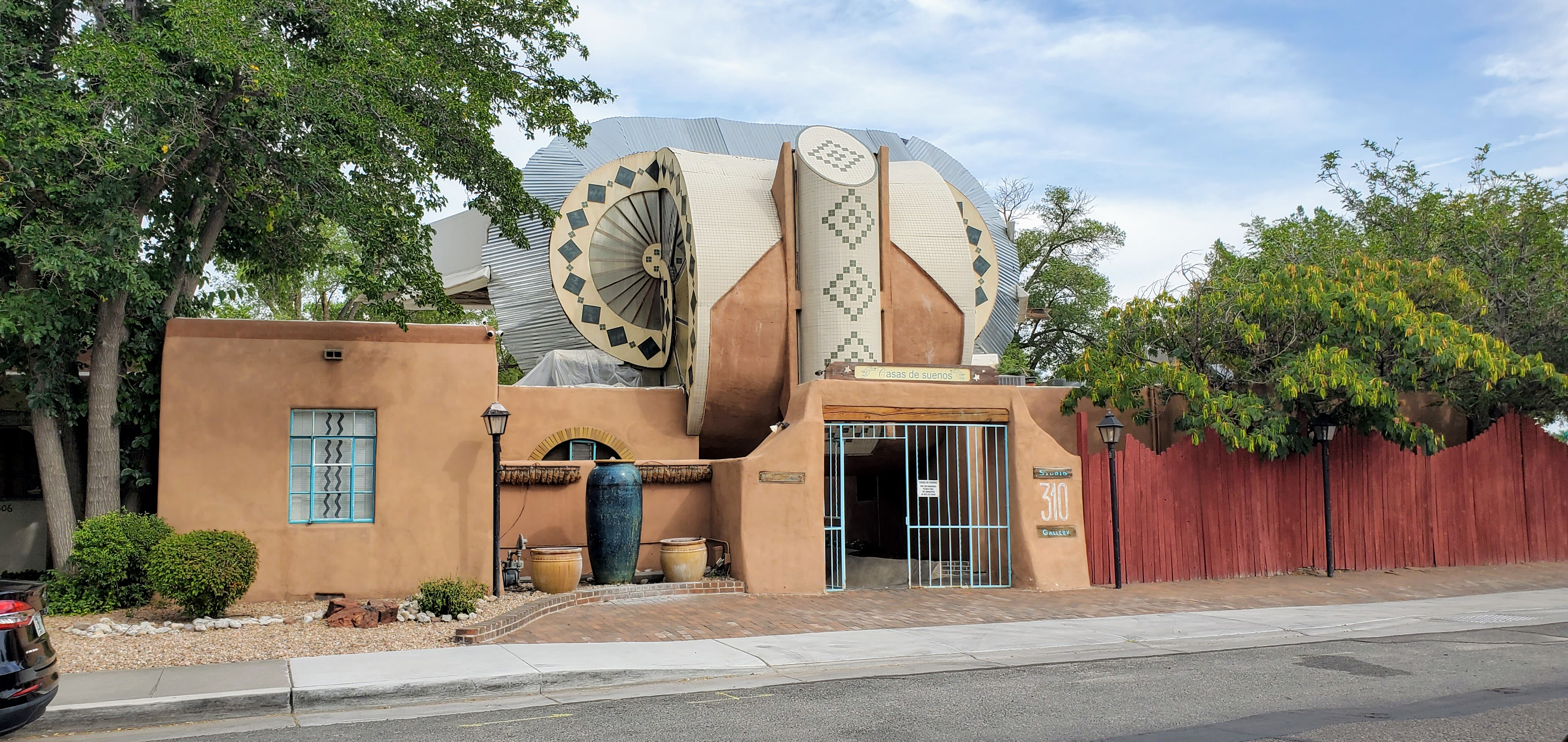
- September 2022

- Location within New Mexico Location within the United States
- Location: 310 Rio Grande Boulevard, SW., Albuquerque, New Mexico
- Coordinates: 35°5′36″N 106°40′16″W
- Built: 1938
- Architect: H. W. Balay
- NRHP reference No.: 05000942
- NMSRCP No.: 1877

Significant dates
- Added to NRHP: September 1, 2005
- Designated NMSRCP: February 18, 2005

The J. R. Willis House and La Miradora Apartments, also known as Casas de Suenos Old Town Country Inn, are a historic Spanish-Pueblo Revival style home and apartment complex in Albuquerque, New Mexico. The home and studio were built by H. W. Balay for Artist J. R. Willis in 1938. The adjacent apartments were constructed between 1938 and 1954. J. R. Willis was a photographer and artist, best known for his Indian photographs and paintings and Southwestern landscapes. J. R. Willis lived and worked in the home and studio through his death in December, 1960. The home, studio and apartments were listed on the National Register of Historic Places in 2005.

The most distinguishing feature of the property is the Hanna Studio Addition, the so-called "Snail House". This addition bridges the open space between the Willis House and studio. Completed in 1978, well after the period of significance and is not part of the historic designation.
