= Los Tomases Chapel =

Historic church in New Mexico, United States

- U.S. National Register of Historic Places
- NM State Register of Cultural Properties
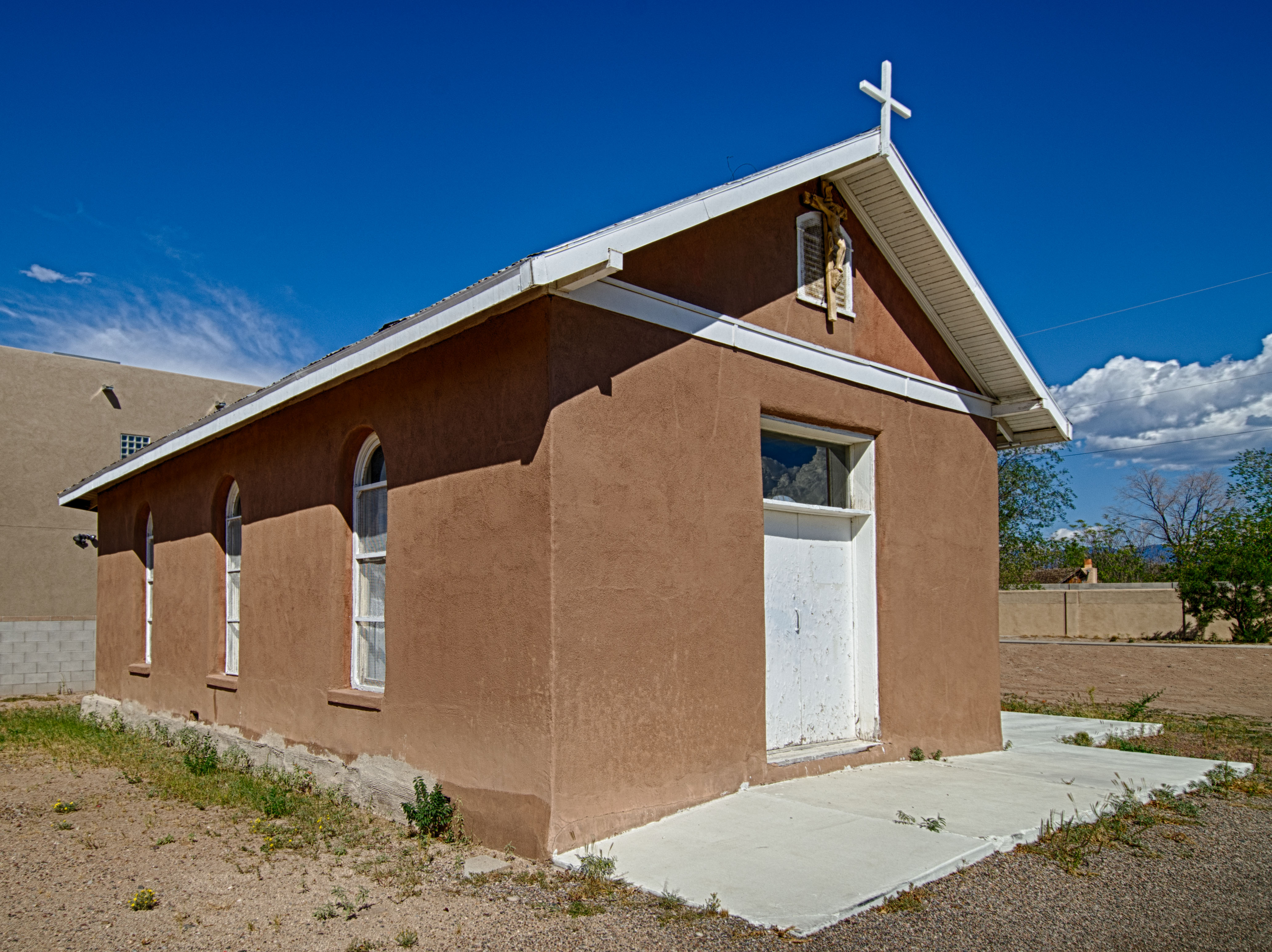
- The chapel in 2012

- Location within New Mexico Location within the United States
- Location: 3101 Los Tomases Dr. NW; Albuquerque, New Mexico
- Coordinates: 35°6′56″N 106°38′55″W
- Built: c. 1920s
- Architectural style: New Mexico vernacular
- NRHP reference No.: 84002876
- NMSRCP No.: 944

Significant dates
- Added to NRHP: February 9, 1984
- Designated NMSRCP: August 25, 1983

Los Tomases Chapel is a historic building in Albuquerque, New Mexico. The chapel was built in the 1920s to serve the late-19th-century North Valley neighborhood of Los Tomases, and remained in occasional use in the 1980s. It was listed on the New Mexico State Register of Cultural Properties in 1983 and the National Register of Historic Places in 1984.

The chapel is a one-story adobe building in the New Mexico vernacular style. It is approximately rectangular in plan with a polygonal apse. The building has a corrugated metal gable roof with exposed rafters and a three-sided hipped section at the rear. Both the east and west sides have three arched, wood-framed 1-over-1 sash windows, and the front entrance has wooden double doors with a transom.
