= Los Duranes Chapel =

Historic church in New Mexico, United States

- U.S. National Register of Historic Places
- NM State Register of Cultural Properties
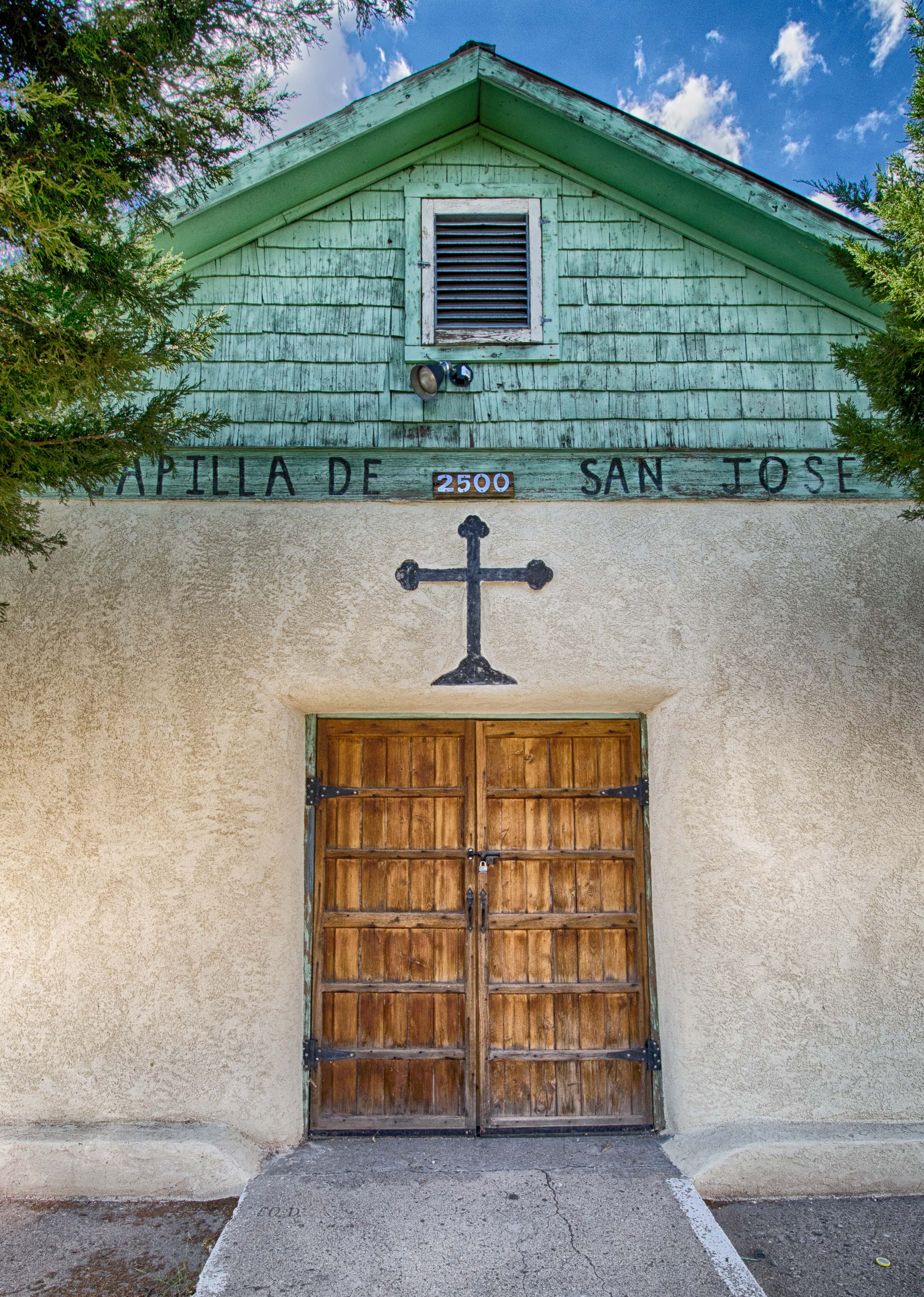
- The chapel in 2012

- Location within New Mexico Location within the United States
- Location: 2601 Indian School Rd. NW; Albuquerque, New Mexico
- Coordinates: 35°6′39″N 106°40′28″W
- Built: c. 1890
- Architectural style: New Mexico vernacular
- NRHP reference No.: 84002854
- NMSRCP No.: 948

Significant dates
- Added to NRHP: February 9, 1984
- Designated NMSRCP: August 25, 1983

San Jose de los Duranes Chapel is a historic building in Albuquerque, New Mexico. The chapel was built around 1890 to serve the community of Los Duranes, one of several outlying plazas spread along the Rio Grande in the vicinity of the main plaza at Old Town Albuquerque. The chapel was replaced with a new, larger San Jose Church in the 1960s, and fell into disrepair. In 1982–1984, community members undertook a restoration of the building, replacing damaged or missing pews, rails, and doors, plastering the walls, repairing holes, and reinstalling the original religious artwork including paintings of the Crucifixion and a santo depicting Saint Joseph. It was listed on the New Mexico State Register of Cultural Properties in 1983 and the National Register of Historic Places in 1984.

The chapel is a one-story adobe building in the New Mexico vernacular style. It is approximately rectangular in plan with a polygonal apse and a small shed-roofed wing on the north side containing the sacristy. The building has a corrugated metal gable roof with a wooden-shingled gable end at the front and a three-sided hipped section at the apse end. The main entrance at the front of the building has wooden double doors underneath a wooden cross and a small belfry. The original bell was stolen, but it was replaced with a new bell during the 1980s restoration.
