= Cal–Linn Building =

- U.S. National Register of Historic Places
- NM State Register of Cultural Properties
- Location within New Mexico Location within the United States
- Location: 6320 Linn Ave. NE; Albuquerque, New Mexico
- Coordinates: 35°4′40″N 106°34′35″W
- Built: 1959
- NRHP reference No.: 100013365
- Added to NRHP: September 1, 2026

The Cal–Linn Building is a commercial office building in Albuquerque, New Mexico, which was a notable site in the history of personal computing. It housed the offices of Micro Instrumentation and Telemetry Systems (MITS), the developers of the Altair 8800 computer, often considered the first commercially successful personal computer, as well as the first headquarters of Microsoft. The building was listed on the National Register of Historic Places in 2026.

The Cal–Linn Building is a one-story concrete and brick structure consisting of a series of staggered bays containing 14 storefront suites. It was built in 1959 by local developers Clarence Dyer and Joseph C. Thomas. In 1973, it became home to the offices and assembly facilities of MITS, a company which expanded from model rocketry into calculators and then developed the Altair 8800 in 1974. The following year, Bill Gates and Paul Allen developed the Altair BASIC software which allowed the Altair to run programs in the BASIC language. Based on the success of this collaboration, Gates and Allen relocated to the Cal–Linn building themselves, where they established their company, Microsoft. Gates described the building in his memoir as "ground zero for what would come to be called the personal computer revolution."
