= El Campo Tourist Courts =

- U.S. National Register of Historic Places
- NM State Register of Cultural Properties
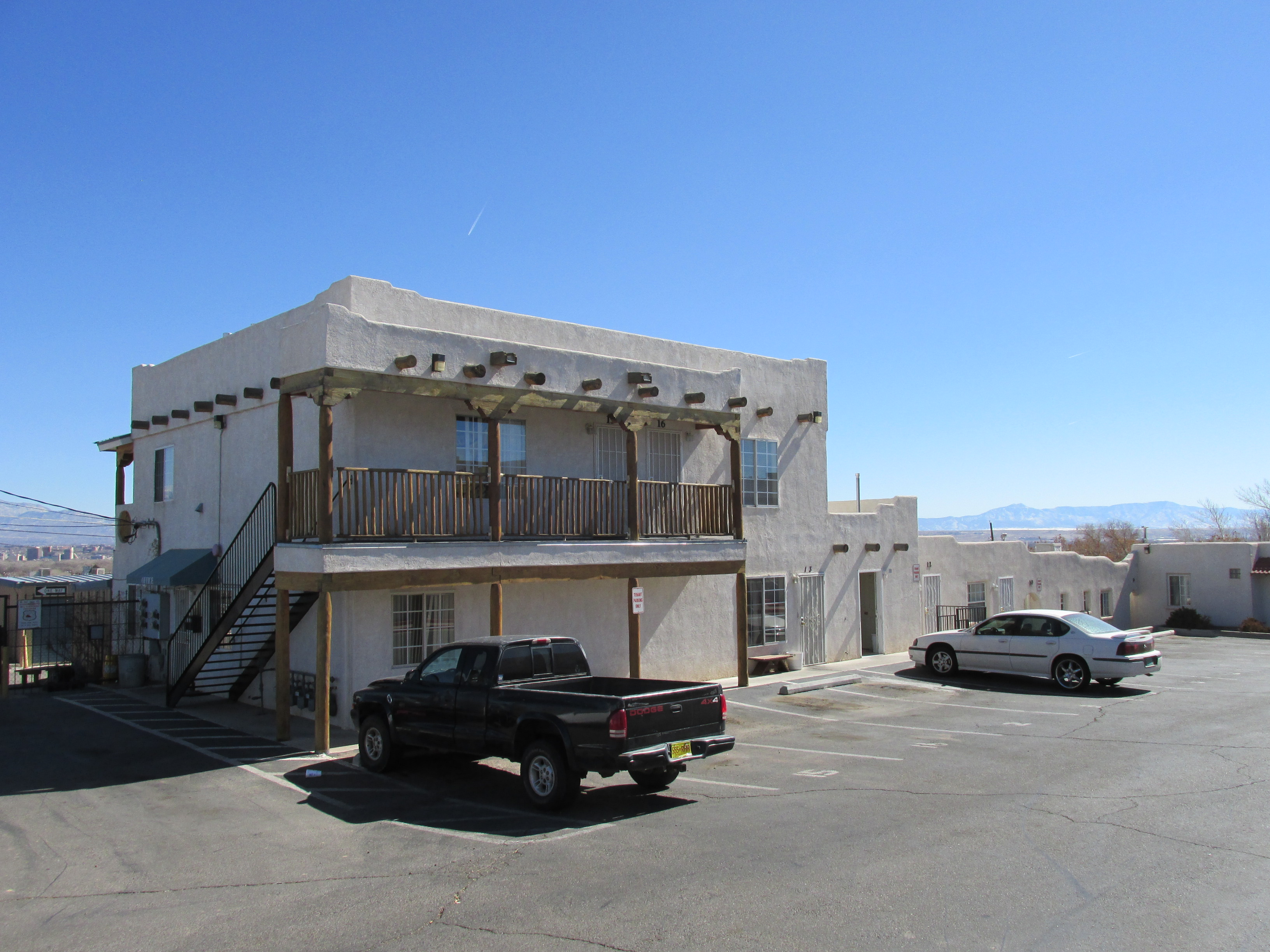
- The motel in 2013. The two-story section was added in the 1990s.

- Location within New Mexico Location within the United States
- Location: 5800 Central Ave. SW, Albuquerque, New Mexico
- Coordinates: 35.081488°N 106.701751°W
- Built: 1939
- Architectural style: Pueblo Revival
- NRHP reference No.: 93001465
- NMSRCP No.: 1588

Significant dates
- Added to NRHP: January 13, 1994
- Designated NMSRCP: November 5, 1993

The El Campo Tourist Courts is a historic motel on Central Avenue (former U.S. Route 66) in Albuquerque, New Mexico, which is notable as one of the best-preserved prewar Route 66 motels remaining in the city. It was built in 1939 by M. H. McGraw and was one of the westernmost Albuquerque motels, located about 3 miles (4.8 km) west of the city center. The motel was later converted into an apartment complex. The property was added to the New Mexico State Register of Cultural Properties in 1993 and the National Register of Historic Places in 1994.

The motel consists of two one-story buildings, one rectangular and one L-shaped, with a total of 11 rooms. Both buildings step down towards the rear of the property due to sloping terrain. The rectangular building has an office and store space at the front which is oriented at 45 degrees to the rest of the building, facing the entrance. A two-story addition was built on the front of the L-shaped building in the 1990s. The motel's architecture is southwestern vernacular, with Pueblo Revival and Spanish Colonial Revival elements.
