= Gavino Anaya House =

Historic house in New Mexico, United States

- U.S. National Register of Historic Places
- NM State Register of Cultural Properties
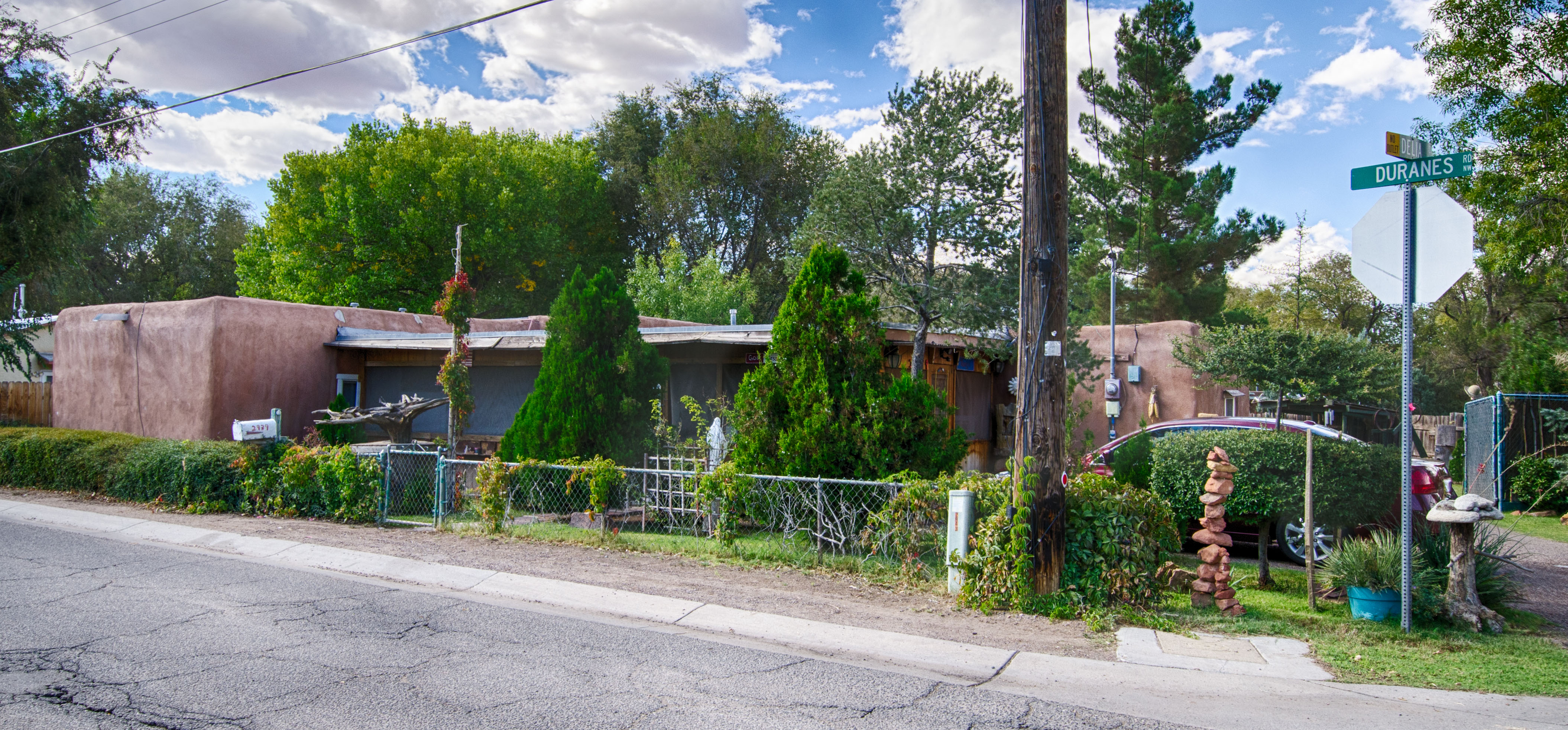

- Location within New Mexico
- Location: 2939 Duranes Rd., NW, Albuquerque, New Mexico
- Coordinates: 35°06′32″N 106°40′57″W
- Area: less than one acre
- MPS: Albuquerque North Valley MRA
- NRHP reference No.: 84002840
- NMSRCP No.: 933

Significant dates
- Added to NRHP: February 9, 1984
- Designated NMSRCP: August 25, 1983

The Gavino Anaya House, at 2939 Duranes Rd., NW in Albuquerque, New Mexico, was listed on the New Mexico State Register of Cultural Properties in 1983 and the National Register of Historic Places in 1984.

It is a terron building with a flat roof, two-foot thick walls, and low doors and windows, with no foundation. It was probably built in a linear style of a row of rooms, probably one at a time; two rooms added later transformed it to an L-shaped plan.

It was assessed by historian Bainbridge Bunting to have been built in the early 1800s, and it is "possibly the oldest least-altered house in the city. Because of its probable age and since it is one of only five minimally altered traditional early L-shaped homes still standing in Albuquerque, the Gavino Anaya House is of local significance."
