= John Milne House =

Historic house in New Mexico, United States

- U.S. National Register of Historic Places
- NM State Register of Cultural Properties
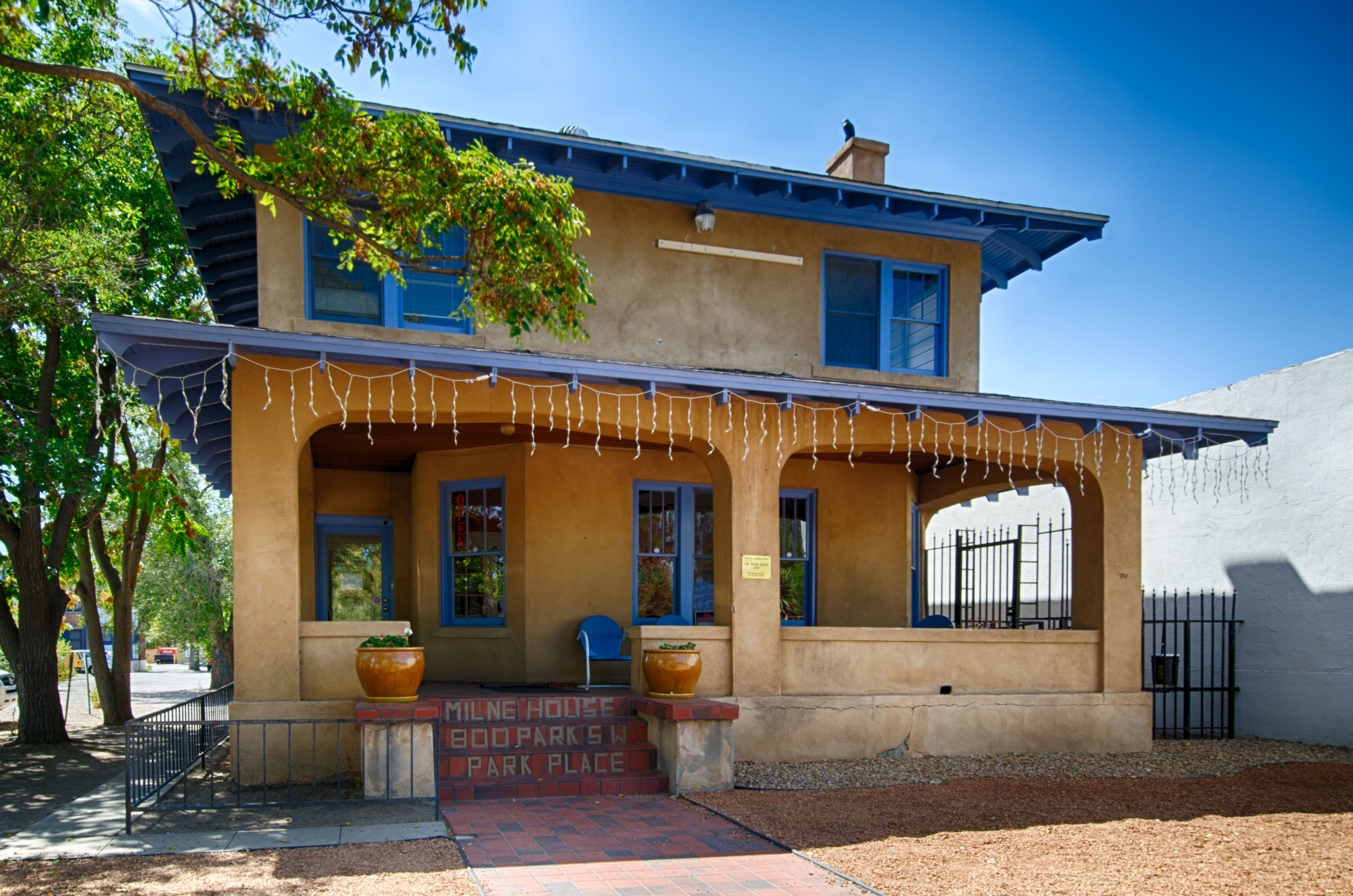
- The house in 2012

- Location within New Mexico Location within the United States
- Location: 804 Park Ave. SW, Albuquerque, New Mexico
- Coordinates: 35°5′6″N 106°39′23″W
- Built: 1917
- Architectural style: Prairie School
- NRHP reference No.: 86000223
- NMSRCP No.: 1172

Significant dates
- Added to NRHP: February 13, 1986
- Designated NMSRCP: July 19, 1985

The John Milne House is a historic house in Albuquerque, New Mexico. It was built in 1917 by John Milne (1880–1956), who was superintendent of Albuquerque Public Schools for 45 years, from 1911 to 1956. During his tenure, he oversaw the growth of the school district from about 1,500 students to more than 38,000. The property was added to the New Mexico State Register of Cultural Properties in 1985 and the National Register of Historic Places in 1986.

The house is a two-story, stuccoed frame building with a hip roof and full-width porch. It is rectangular in plan with a rear extension. The architecture is simplified Prairie School, with broad overhanging eaves and carved rafters. The front elevation has paired windows placed at the edges of the second floor, emphasizing the horizontal dimension. Wood-framed 3-over-1 sash windows are used throughout the house.
