= Charles Grande House =

Historic house in New Mexico, United States

- U.S. National Register of Historic Places
- NM State Register of Cultural Properties
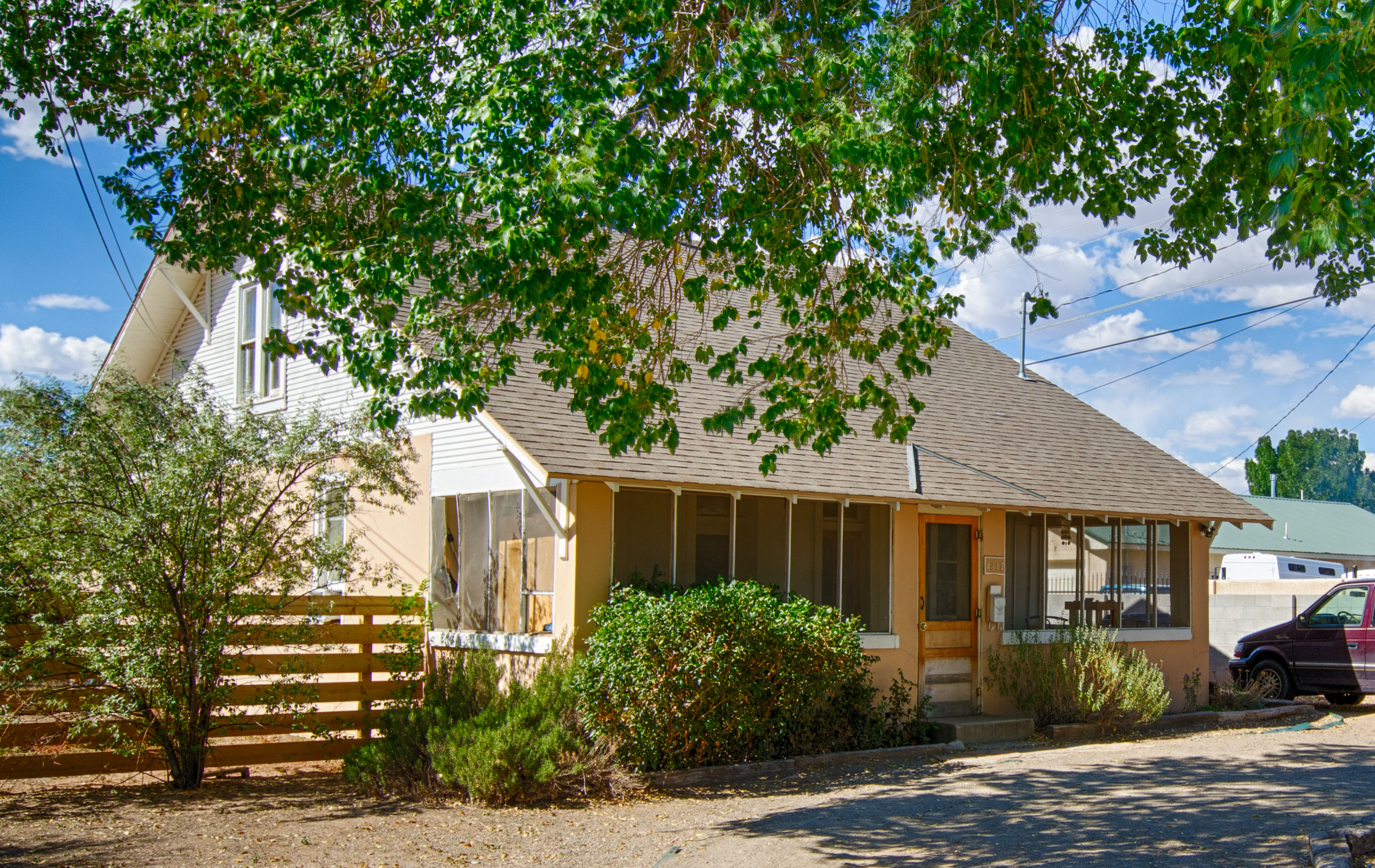
- The house in 2012

- Location within New Mexico Location within the United States
- Location: 4317 Grande Dr. NW; Albuquerque, New Mexico
- Coordinates: 35°07′46″N 106°39′17″W
- Built: 1915
- Architectural style: Bungalow
- NRHP reference No.: 84002866
- NMSRCP No.: 938

Significant dates
- Added to NRHP: February 9, 1984
- Designated NMSRCP: August 25, 1983

The Charles Grande House is a historic farmhouse in Albuquerque, New Mexico. It was built in 1915 by Charles Grande, an Italian immigrant who worked in the hotel and saloon business, and his wife Carmelita Garcia, who was from a New Mexico family. The Grandes operated a vineyard and raised livestock on the property, which was later subdivided for residential development in the 1950s. The building was added to the New Mexico State Register of Cultural Properties in 1983 and the National Register of Historic Places in 1984.

The house is a 1 1/2-story bungalow with a full-width screened porch. It has a broad gable roof with clapboarded gables and overhanging eaves supported by brackets. The house is in largely unaltered condition with original doors and sash windows throughout.
