= Hope Building =

- U.S. National Register of Historic Places
- NM State Register of Cultural Properties
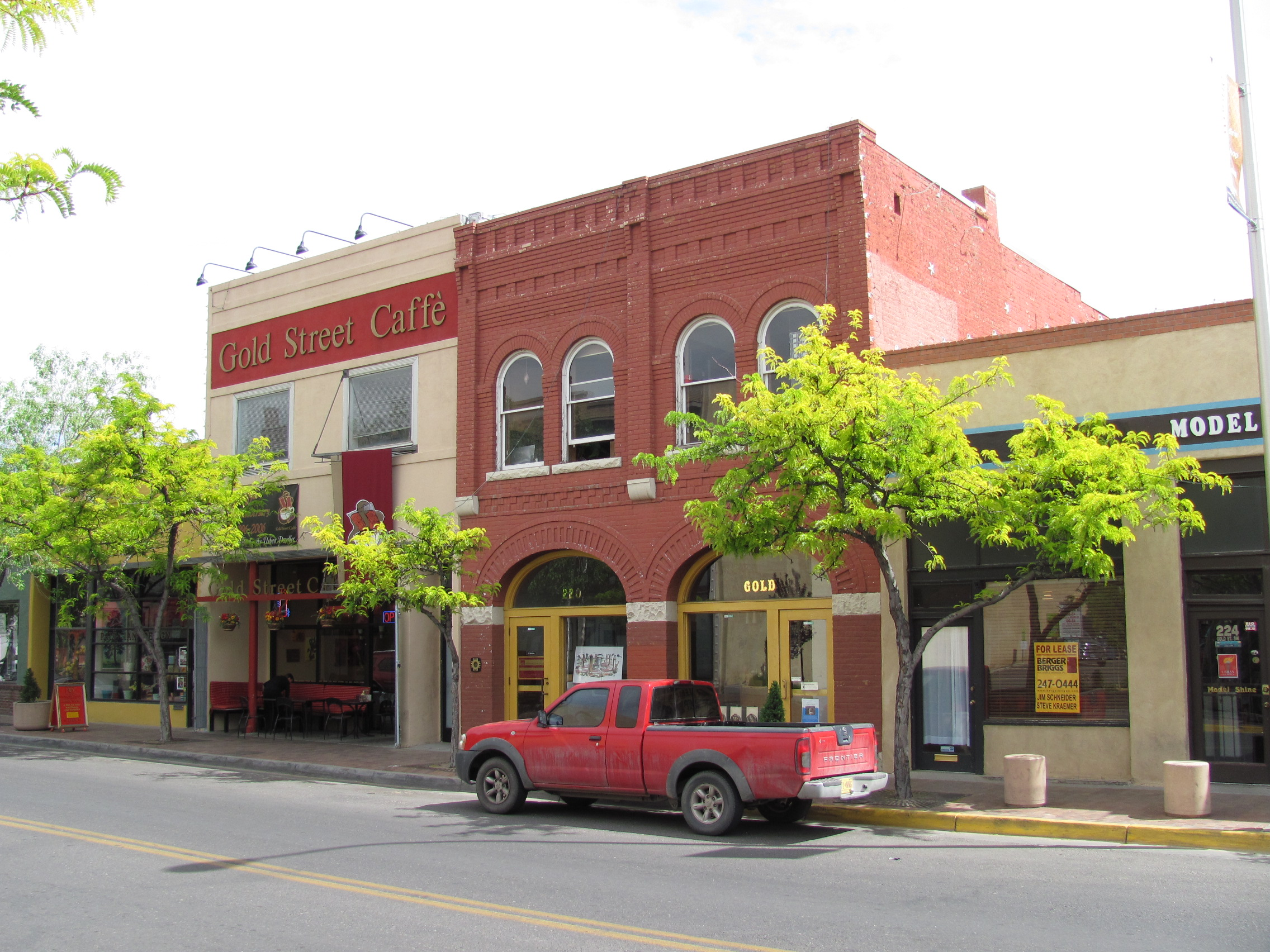
- Hope Building, May 2010

- Location within New Mexico Location within the United States
- Location: 220 Gold Ave. SW; Albuquerque, New Mexico
- Coordinates: 35°04′27″N 106°38′58″W
- Built: 1894
- NRHP reference No.: 80002539
- NMSRCP No.: 768

Significant dates
- Added to NRHP: August 29, 1980
- Designated NMSRCP: May 16, 1980

The Hope Building is a historic commercial building in Albuquerque, New Mexico. Built in 1894, it is one of the only surviving 19th century buildings in Downtown Albuquerque. It was added to the New Mexico State Register of Cultural Properties and the National Register of Historic Places in 1980.

== History ==
The Hope Building was built in 1894 to house the medical offices and residence of Dr. Walter G. Hope. Hope and his family moved out of the upstairs living space in 1905 but he continued to use the office portion of the building until 1909. During the following century, the building housed a wide variety of tenants including a photography studio, a hatter, the New Mexico State Tribune newspaper, a restaurant, a beauty school, a furniture store, and a rubber stamp company. Meanwhile, nearly all of the other 19th century buildings remaining downtown were razed by various urban renewal programs in the 1960s and 1970s.

The upper floor of the Hope Building was converted from residential use to offices around 1950. Around this time the front of the building was stuccoed over and the ground floor arches were squared off. In 1977, the building was purchased by a private partnership including a local architecture firm which undertook a restoration of the building to its original exterior appearance.

== Architecture ==
The Hope Building is typical of the small commercial buildings built in Albuquerque during the second wave of railroad-related construction in the 1890s, almost none of which survive today. It is a two-story building occupying the entirety of its 25-foot (7.6 m) by 142-foot (43 m) lot, part of the original Albuquerque townsite established in 1880. The building originally had a depth of 70 feet (21 m) with a wooden porch at the rear but later additions brought it to its present dimensions. The original portion of the building has 12-inch (300 mm) load-bearing brick exterior walls with a single row of interior columns on the first floor and a wooden roof truss providing a column-free second floor.

The red brick facade has two arched openings on the ground floor and two pairs of arched sash windows separated by a central column on the second floor. The windowsills and the bases of the ground floor arches are cast stone. The Hope Building originally had eight windows in each side wall, four upstairs and four downstairs, but all but two upstairs windows on the west side have been covered by later construction. The building's interior has been remodeled many times and does not retain any original details.
