= South Charter Street Historic District =

Historic district in Illinois, United States

- U.S. National Register of Historic Places
- U.S. Historic district
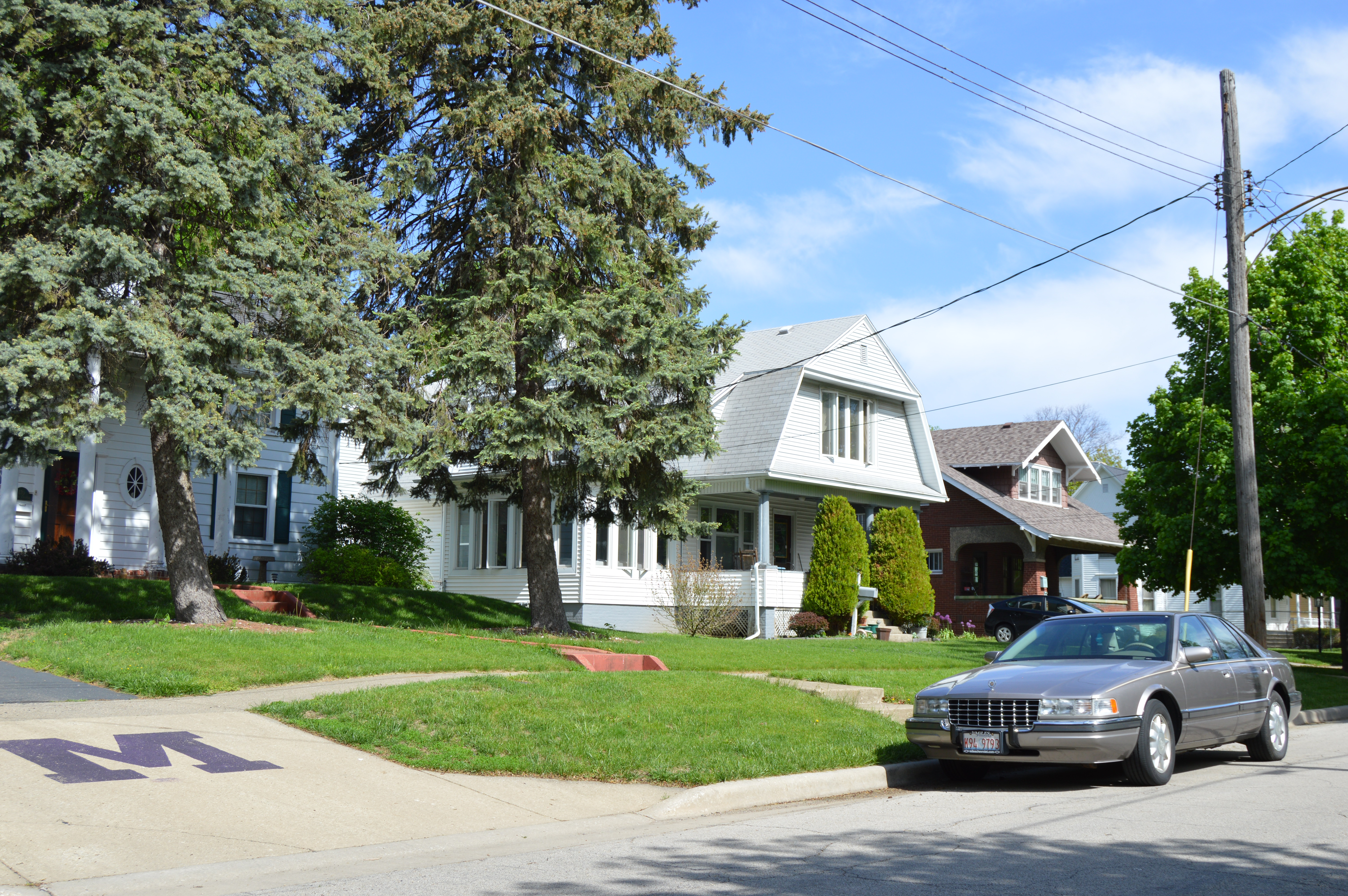
- Western side of the 400 block

- Location within Illinois Location within the United States
- Location: Roughly bounded by Marion and South Market Sts., Sage Dr., and South State St., Monticello, Illinois
- Coordinates: 40°1′41″N 88°34′23″W
- Area: 13.5 acres (5.5 ha)
- Built: 1855
- NRHP reference No.: 01001464
- Added to NRHP: January 17, 2002

The South Charter Street Historic District is a nationally designated historic district in Monticello, Piatt County, Illinois. The residential historic district includes all of South Charter Street from Marion Street to Sage Drive; it contains 73 buildings, 59 of which are considered contributing to its historic character. The houses display a variety of architectural styles and vernacular designs popular in the late 19th and early 20th centuries. The district was added to the National Register of Historic Places on January 17, 2002.

== History ==
Part of South Charter Street formed one of the first two areas, known as the Out Lots, to be developed outside of Monticello's original town plat. The remainder came from a section known as Mary J. Piatt's South Addition, which adjoined the southern Out Lot and was platted in 1858. By 1875, the Out Lots section of South Charter Street had been developed, but the section in the addition was still largely empty. From 1870 onward, the district was settled by new residents of Monticello; many of them came from Ohio, particularly Pickaway County. These residents and their families tended to occupy their new houses for a long time; in one case, the Coleman family and the McIntosh family occupied the house at 404 South Charter for a combined 130 years.

== Architecture ==
Nine architectural styles and several vernacular designs are represented within the district. The Gothic Revival style was the first used in the district. Later in the 19th century, Italianate and Queen Anne homes were built during periods of national popularity for the styles. The turn of the century saw several revival styles grow in popularity; the Colonial Revival, Georgian Revival, Classical Revival, Dutch Colonial Revival, and Tudor Revival styles were all used in the district during this period. In addition, several American Craftsman style homes were built in the district in the early 20th century.

The Gabled Ell plan, which became popular following the Civil War, is the most common vernacular type in the district; it features an asymmetrical L- or T-shaped plan with a gable roof. Around the 1890s, I-houses and a pyramidal cottage house were built; the former is a two-story plan popular in the rural Midwest at the time, while the latter is a typical Southern design with a distinctive pyramidal hip roof. The bungalow and Foursquare types became popular in the district in the early 20th century, often in conjunction with American Craftsman elements.
