= Edward Buxton Cristy =

American/New Mexican architect (1860–1934)

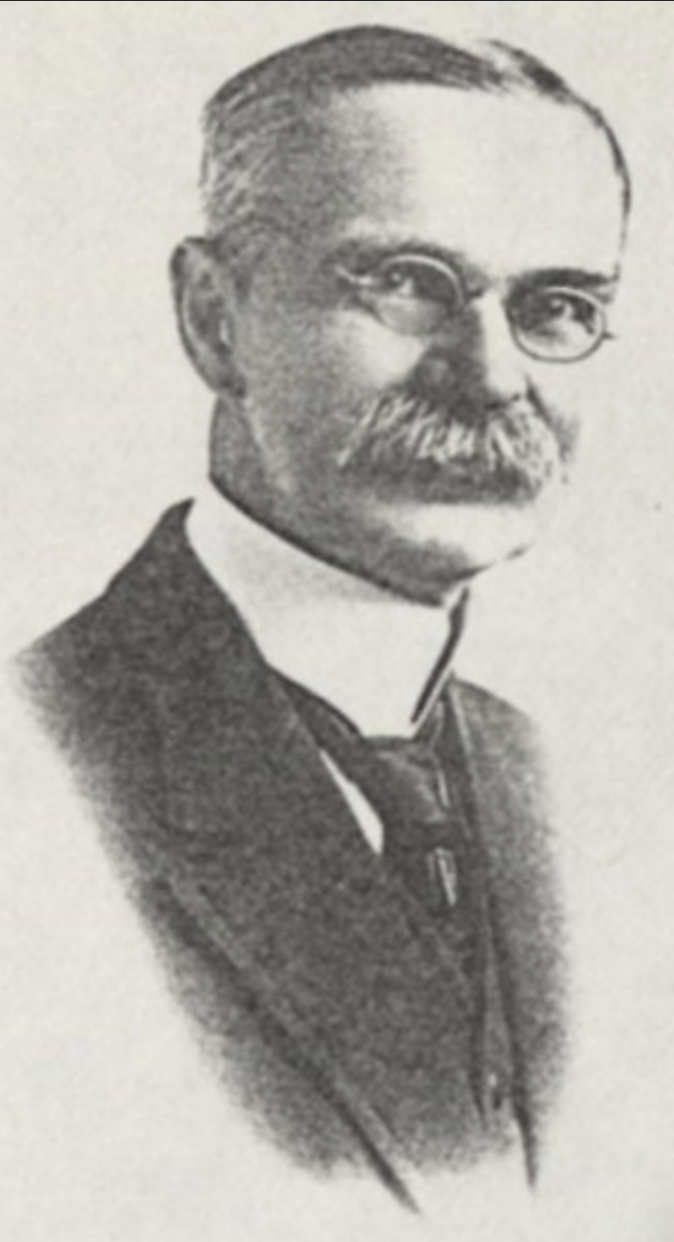
- c. 1916 – 1918
- Born: November 2, 1860; New York City
- Died: February 20, 1934; Albuquerque, New Mexico, U.S.
- Education: Phillips Exeter Academy; Columbia University
- Occupation: Architect
- Spouse(s): Estelle Cristy (nee Gillespy), 1860–1932
- Children: 2, Anne Cristy Henderson (Mrs. Algo Henderson), 1897–1962. Edward James Cristy, 1899–2002.

Edward Buxton Cristy (1860–1934) was among the first architects working in and from Albuquerque, New Mexico in the late 19th and early 20th centuries. In a growing city, he designed residential, commercial, and institutional structures. His work with William Tight at the University of New Mexico involved study of pueblos and incorporation of their forms into contemporary projects. This defined Pueblo Revival architecture.

== Biography ==
Cristy was born in New York City and raised in nearby Greenwich, Connecticut. He attended Phillips Exeter Academy and Columbia University, receiving a "Bachelor of Philosophy (Course of Architecture)" in 1891. His degree is sometimes mis-described as a "Ph.D.", or doctorate, but this contradicts original sources. (Bachelor of Philosophy is often abbreviated "Ph.B.")

Due to ill health, he moved to Albuquerque in 1892, where he practiced as "E. B. Cristy." Initially, he supplemented his income by teaching at a private boarding school, by teaching drawing, drafting, and higher mathematics at the University, and by serving as the city's plumbing inspector. He married Estelle Gillespy in Denver on July 20, 1896.

With the then-recent establishment of the Santa Fe Railway Shops, Albuquerque was growing rapidly from village to city. Cristy established himself as an architect and became architect for the Angus A. Grant estate, a major holder of real estate in Albuquerque's new center.

As a prominent community member, he volunteered on the city's park commission for several years, was a member of the Masons, the Order of Odd Fellows, and an active elder in the Presbyterian Church. He was one the "Ten Dons," a group of ten prominent city men who met monthly for dinner and the presentations on current topics.

"Most of Cristy's designs are in the standard styles of the period" but he participated in the conception of Pueblo Revival. From his arrival in Albuquerque until his death in 1934, Cristy practiced for nearly forty years. Including six contributing properties, thirteen of his known commissions are listed on the National Register of Historic Places. Much of his work remains unattributed.

== Pueblo Revival at the University of New Mexico (UNM) ==
Cristy's significant work at UNM began in 1900 when he designed the University's Hadley Science Hall, a traditional two and a half story brick Richardson Romanesque structure, and, after the Main Building (now Hodgin Hall), the second major building on campus. The following year, UNM's third president, William G. Tight, took office envisioning a campus reflecting indigenous Southwestern architecture. Cristy was enlisted in implementing Tight’s vision:

"E. B, Cristy has returned to the city from the pueblo of Taos, N. M., where he went the early part of the week to take observations of some of the pueblo buildings, which he expects to reproduce in plans for the University of New Mexico. Several new buildings are to be added to the university in the near future and it is a hobby of Dr. Tight to have them resemble the architecture of Taos." (Albuquerque Evening Citizen, September 14, 1907)

The novel style was both acclaimed and controversial; detractors described it as "reverting to the primitive." This, and other controversies, led to Tight’s resignation in 1909, but he had successfully commissioned Cristy for six structures in the Pueblo style. (Estufa and Cristy's remodel of Hodgin Hall remain.) In 1910, punctuating Tight’s departure, Cristy’s traditionally styled Hadley Science Hall burned to the ground. Subsequent campus development did not consistently adhere to Pueblo Revival,although Cristy oversaw the 1920 construction of the Pueblo designed Sara Raynolds Hall.

Beginning in 1934, the year of Cristy's death, Tight's and Cristy's Pueblo Revival would be amplified on campus, in Santa Fe, and throughout the Southwest, when John Gaw Meem was engaged as UNM's official architect.

== List of works ==
This list is certainly incomplete, especially for residential commissions; as of 1907, these included "most of the finer residences in the city." In later institutional commissions, Cristy was sometimes the local supervising (on-site) architect for another firm. It is sometimes unclear when this was the case.

Addresses are in Albuquerque unless noted otherwise.

== University of New Mexico Commissions ==
Name	Address	Built	Other Information	Image
Gymnasium	UNM Campus	1899	Frame bldg, 25 X 50 feet. Demolished.	No image.
Hadley Science Hall	UNM Campus	1900	Burned down, 1910.	
Heating Plant	UNM Campus	1905	Demolished.	No image.
Hokana Hall	UNM Campus	1906	Women's dormitory, demolished.	
Kwataka Hall	UNM Campus	1906	Men's dormitory, demolished.	
Estufa	SE corner University Blvd & Martin Luther King Blvd	1907	Student-designed, Cristy approved. National Register of Historic Places.	
Hodgin Hall	1900 Redondo Drive, UNM Campus	1908	Remodelled by Cristy over Jesse Wheelock's 1892 design. National Register of Historic Places.	
Rodey Hall	UNM Campus	1908	Demolished 1970.	
Sara Raynolds Hall	2000 Redondo Drive, UNM Campus	1920	Cristy supervising architect under Arno K. Leupold. National Register of Historic Places.	

== Other Education Commissions ==
Name	Address	Built	Other Information	Image
Second Ward School	700 South Edith Blvd	1893	Enlarged in 1902, demolished 1927 and replaced by Eugene Field Elementary.	
Central High School	Corner of Third St, and Lead Avenue.	1900	Demolished.	
NM School of Mines	Socorro, NM	1901		No image.
Belen School Board	Belen, NM	Before 1912		No image.
Saint Vincent's Academy	NW corner, Sixth & Lomas Avenues	Before 1912	Remodel or addition to 1884 structure. Demolished.	
Pierson Hall	Menaul School Campus	1903	Remodel. Demolished 1957.	
Hart Gymnasium	Menaul School Campus	1916		
Teacher's Hall	Menaul School Campus	1920	Cristy supervising construction, design by Annie Rockfellow of the firm of Henry O. Jaastad. Extant and in use as of 2026.	
Bennett Hall	Menaul School Campus	1924	Cristy supervising construction, design by Annie Rockfellow of the firm of Henry O. Jaastad.	
Sage Memorial Administration Building	Allison-James School, Santa Fe, NM.	1924	Cristy supervising, designer unknown.	No image.

== Church Commissions ==
Name	Address	Built	Other Information	Image
Immaculate Conception Church	Sixth & Copper Avenues	Before 1907.	Remodel of interior.	
First Presbyterian Church	424 Silver Avenue	1905-06	Fully designed by Cristy. Demolished.	
First Congregational Church	Coal & Central Avenues	1893	Remodel after fire. Demolished 1960.	
Episcopal Church	324 Silver Avenue	Before 1912.	Cristy did an early remodel preceding an historically-respectful enlargement and remodel by John Gaw Meem in 1930 and 1950. (Pre-Meem structure is in stone.) National Register of Historic Places.	
Methodist Episcopalian Church	Fourth and Coal Avenues	Before 1904?	The 1904 reconstruction is credited to Charles Frederick Whittlesey. National Register of Historic Places.	

== Other Institutional Commissions ==
Name	Address	Built	Other Information	Image
Albuquerque City Hall	Second & Tijeras Avenues	1913	Shown "as planned" on 1913 Sanborn Insurance Map. Demolished.	
Odd Fellows Hall	Second Ave. between Silver and Lead Avenues	1909	Demolished about 1972.	
Y.M.C.A. Building	NE corner, First & Central Avenues	1915	Supervising and revising. Demolished 1974.	
Albuquerque Morning Journal	312 West Gold Avenue	1905	Addition to building. Image from 1883.	
N. T. Armijo Building ("Armijo Block")	NW corner, Third & Central Avenues	1892	Probably a remodel over the work of Jesse Wheelock. Cristy had an office here. Demolished 1969.	
Barnett Block	SW corner, Second & Central Avenues	Before 1907	Demolished.	
Kistler-Collister (in the Giomi Building)	Second & Central Avenues	After 1909	Storefront remodel. First storefront in Albuquerque to have curved glass walls on either side of entrance.	
Southwest Presbyterian Sanatorium (now Presbyterian Hospital)	1100 East Central Avenue	Before 1912	Demolished in 1967 and replaced by Presbyterian Hospital.	
Hazeltine Infirmary	Southwest Presbyterian Sanatorium	1926	Demolished 1973. (Pictured.)	
Nurses Home	Southwest Presbyterian Sanatorium	1929		
Maytag Laboratory	168 Oak Street (Presbyterian Hospital Campus)	1930	Cristy supervising under Sutton & Routt. Extant and in use as of 2026, but compromised.	
Bank of Magdalena	First and Main Streets, Magdalena, New Mexico	1908-12	National Register of Historic Places.	
Belen Bank	114 Becker Avenue, Belen, New Mexico	May 1909 - 1912		No image.
Holbrook Bank	19 or 21 Central Ave., Holbrook, Arizona	Before 1912	See Sanborn Insurance Map, 1910, 1916.	No image.
First National Bank	Second and Gold	Before 1912.	Not the existing structure at Central and Second from 1923. Remodel.	No image.

== Residential Commissions ==
Name	Address	Built	Other Information	Image
W. J. Marsh House	301 South Edith	c.1895	Contributing property in Huning Highlands.	
David Ross Boyd House	123 South High St.	c.1895	Contributing property in Huning Highlands.	
Dr. James Wroth House	508 West Copper	1895	Demolished.	No image.
Edward Buxton Cristy House.	201 South Walter	1896-7	Cristy's self-designed home. Contributing property in Huning Highlands.	
House at 216 South Broadway	216 South Broadway	1901	Built for Fred W. Fisher. Contributing property in Huning Highlands.	
House at 608 South Arno	608 South Arno	1901	Extant and in use as of 2026, but compromised. Photograph from 1975.	
Lulu Hopping House	737 South Edith	1901	National Register of Historic Places.	
William R. Whitney House	302 South Walter	1907	Contributing Property in Huning Highlands.	
Charles A. Bottger House	110 San Felipe NW	1912	National Register of Historic Places.	
Robert E. Putney House	1101/1105 West Central Ave.	c. 1913	Demolished.	
"Court" Quickel House	810 Park Avenue SW	1902-08	Demolished 1965. "Court" likely refers to Cortez, a.k.a Cort: Cortez Swartz Quickel, 1887-1928.	
House at 215 South Fourteenth	Given as "214" in Pratt, but see Sanborn Maps and Estelle Cristy's death certificate.	1919	The later Cristy home. Frame house built for $3,000. (Bldg permit #1726) Demolished.	
