= Lulu Hopping House =

Historic house in New Mexico, United States

- U.S. National Register of Historic Places
- NM State Register of Cultural Properties
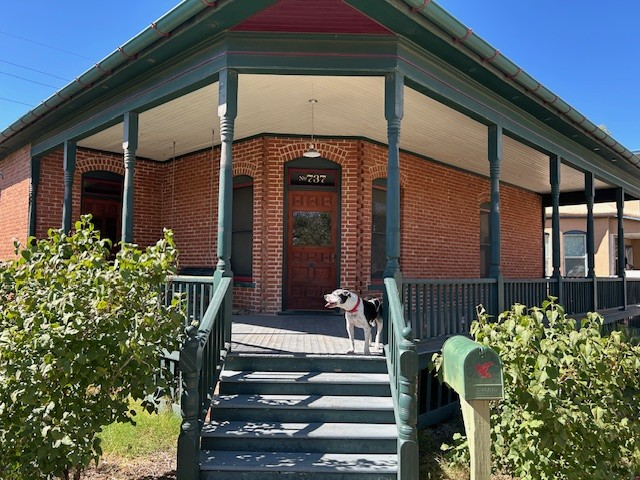
- Hopping House entry from the southeast.

- Location within New Mexico Location within the United States
- Location: 737 Edith Blvd SE, Albuquerque, New Mexico
- Coordinates: 35°04′33″N 106°38′37″W
- Built: 1901; 125 years ago
- Architect: Edward Buxton Cristy
- Architectural style: Folk Victorian, Pyramidal cottage
- NRHP reference No.: 100012951
- NMSRCP No.: 1098

Significant dates
- Added to NRHP: May 1, 2026
- Designated NMSRCP: February 13, 1926

The Lulu Hopping House is an historic residence in the South Broadway neighborhood of Albuquerque, New Mexico. It is a pyramidal cottage of brick, and typical of working-class housing in Albuquerque during the decades following establishment of the Santa Fe Railyard Shops. Built in 1901, it remains essentially unmodified and is listed on the New Mexico State Register of Cultural Properties and the National Register of Historic Places.

== Description ==
The Lulu Hopping House is on a stone foundation and is built of low-fired ("pugmill") brick with lime mortar as double-wythe cavity walls in stretcher bond. The footprint is square, forty feet on a side at the roof-line. There is a framed and screened cooking porch on the back, off the kitchen, with its own shed roof and chimney. The east side and half of the south side are an engaged porch spanning 40% of the masonry perimeter. The roof over the porch is supported by nine turned columns. The main 6/12 hip roof forms a pyramid, topped with a finial. There are three brick chimneys: one from the parlor, one from the kitchen, and the wall-mounted chimney on the cooking porch. Appropriate to the house's placement on a corner lot, the front door faces the corner on champhered face constructed by "zipper" or "pigeon-hole" masonry joints.

There are four large interconnected rooms, two wide and two deep, (a "four-box plan") but with a small bathroom between the kitchen and bedroom. No hallways. Three of the four rooms have large windows on each exterior wall. The kitchen has one such window and a what would have been a smaller, higher, window over the kitchen sink. This smaller window (onto the cooking porch) has been converted to an in-wall cabinet. Hardware on the cabinet matches the door hardware throughout the house. Thus it would have been an early modification. The 1902 Sanborn map shows the cooking porch as open, but the 1908 Sanborn map shows the cooking porch enclosed, as it was when the 2009 owners acquired the house and removed cement stucco and beveled siding to reveal a previously screened porch. The kitchen "window cabinet" was probably converted with the early enclosure of the cooking porch. There is an identically-sized small window in the bathroom over the bathtub. All windows are double-hung (1/1) and externally crested with segmented arches.

Ceilings are ten feet high with picture rails in the front room, the parlor, and the bedroom. Premium but off-the-shelf mill work is used for doors, windows, and baseboards. The kitchen and the bathroom have 39-inch wainscoting. Most rooms are separated by swinging doors, but the front-entry/dining-room is separated from the adjoining parlor by a double pocket door. The pocket doors separating the parlor from the entry/dining room suggests a cottage in the Queen Anne "parlor by-pass plan."

The pyramidal roof and four-box floor plan meet the definition of a pyramidal cottage, but there are exceptional features; the large wrap-around porch with turned posts, the roof finial, high ceilings, the wainscoting are all characteristic of Queen Anne. Typically pyramidal cottages are vernacular or mass-produced ("company housing"). This pyramidal cottage was custom designed by an accomplished architect and built by a professional contractor. Although the Lulu Hopping House is the size and quality typical of its working-class neighborhood, as a pyramidal cottage it is large and refined.

== Historic context ==

Following New Mexico's establishment as a territory of the United States, Albuquerque's economic development was intense. The Santa Fe Railway Shops and an extensive rail yard were built east of Old Town Albuquerque. East of, and adjacent to, the Railway Shops and the track, residential property was platted as what are now the Huning Highlands and South Broadway neighborhoods. Employment at the Railway Shops and at the adjacent Albuquerque Foundry and Machine Works attracted hundreds of skilled and semi-skilled workers from the eastern United States and from European countries. Two generations of the Hopping family were a part of this influx.

In 1880, Abraham Shotwell Hopping (1834–1889) was proprietor of a machine shop in Mount Pleasant, Iowa. His 19-year-old son, William Osborne Hopping (1860–1919) was a "molder," implying that the Hopping shop was also a foundry. Abraham and his wife Elizabeth (nee Hull, 1839–1910) had six sons and one daughter. Abraham, Elizabeth, and all six sons were in Albuquerque by 1886. At least five of six sons found employment as molders or machinists with William becoming foreman at Albuquerque Foundry and Machine Works. The grown Hopping sons acquired homes within two blocks their parents and of each other; also within a few blocks of the Albuquerque Foundry and Machine Works. The Lulu Hopping House was built on the south edge of this cluster of Hoppings.

== History ==
Buckley Carl Hopping (1862–1938, "Carl"), the second of the Hopping brothers, married Louisa (Lulu) Morgan Dungan (1867–1949) in 1885 in Iowa. In Albuquerque they first resided at 617 South Edith, directly across from Carl's parents's and his brother William's houses. In 1892 he is a machinist living at 618 South Edith. In 1901 Carl is the proprietor of Albuquerque Novelty Works living at 617 South Edith.

Louisa was always called Lulu, appearing in newspapers as Mrs. Lulu Hopping or as Mrs. Carl Hopping. Lulu instigated their new house by purchasing the lot on August 3, 1901 for $325 The house was completed, by Lulu, in 1901, having been designed by Edward Buxton Cristy and built by contractor A. W. Hayden for $1,800.

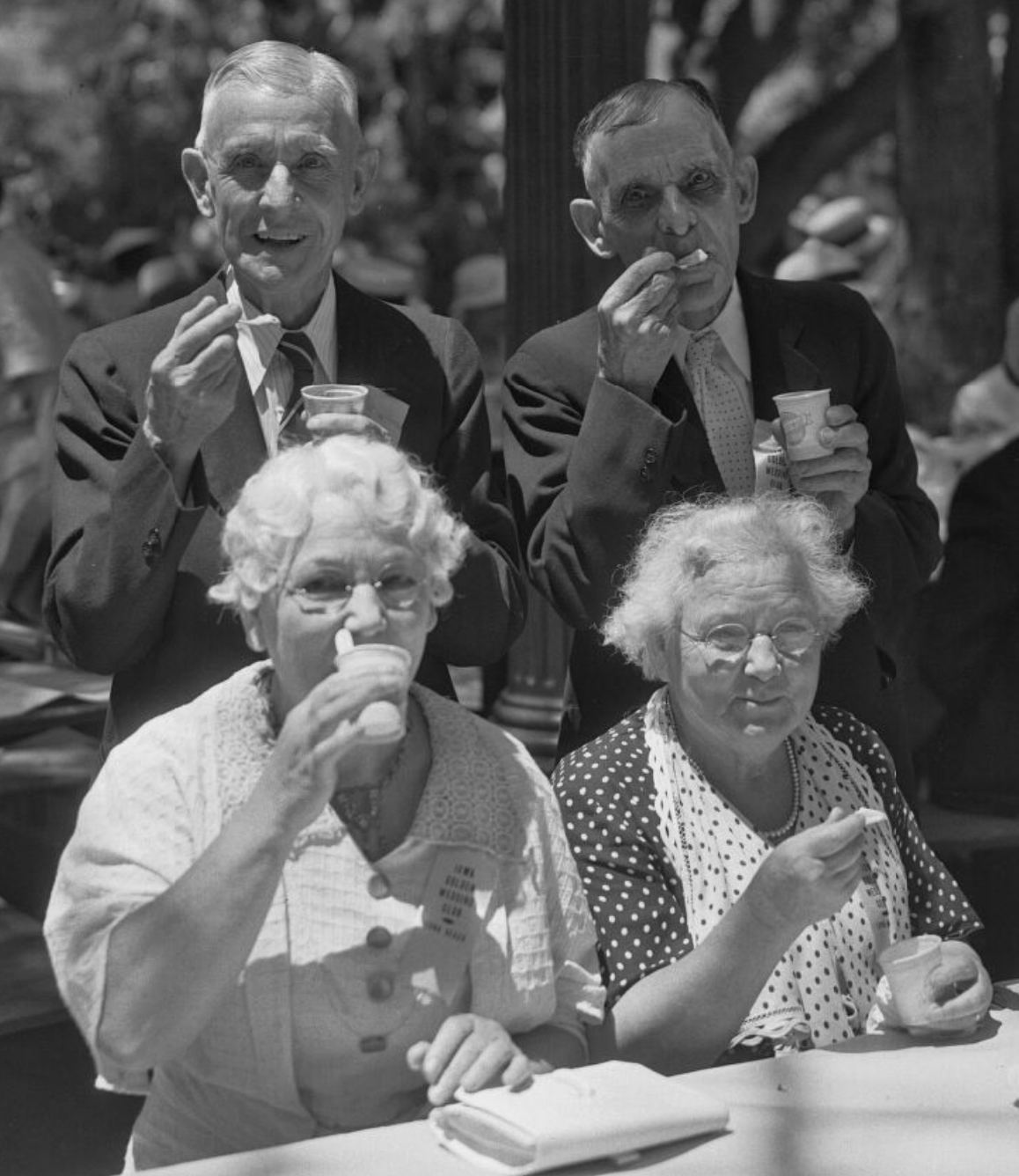
Carl, Frank, Lulu, and Kate Hopping, 1935. Two brothers married two sisters.

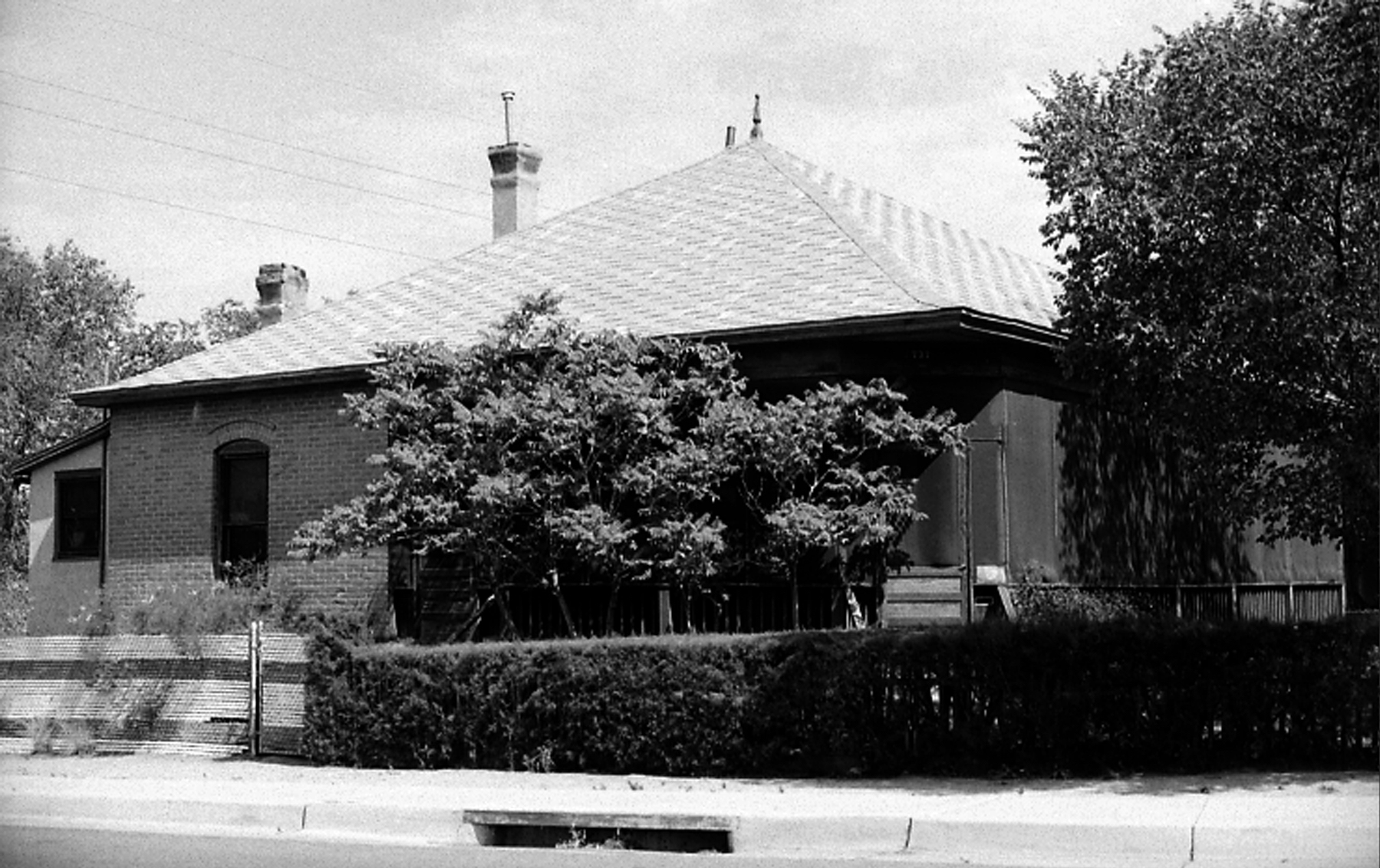
South side in 1980. Cooking porch (far left) enclosed, Front porch screened.

Chronology of occupants:

- 1901–1906 – Lulu and Carl Hopping
- 1907–1913 – Edgar Bass (1852–1924) was a Munich-born grocer operating the Broadway Grocery and Meat Market at nearby 702 South Broadway, across the street from the entrance to Albuquerque Foundry and Machine Works. Bass's daughter Beulah was married in the house.
- 1914–1917 – Rev. Dr. Elmer Bugg Atwood (1874–1957) was Corresponding Secretary and/or Superintendent of Missions of the Baptist Convention of New Mexico while he lived here. He left in 1919 to become the fourth President of Wayland Baptist College (now University). His two boys included Lee Atwood.
- 1920–1963 – John Buday (1877–1963) and his eldest son Victor (~1903–1997) were machinists at the Santa Fe Railway Shops. John, his wife Elizabeth, and Victor were born in Hungary. Victor inscribed his name and the date, February 22, 1919 at the head of Rinconada Canyon in what is now Petroglyphs National Monument.
- 1920–1995 – Julia Buday (1908–1995) was the spinster daughter of John Buday. She spent most her life in the house, making few if any changes.

The Hopping men were machinists and foundrymen who moved west from Iowa. John and Victor Buday were machinists and immigrants from Hungary. These men worked at the Santa Fe engine shops or at the Albuquerque Foundry, then the city's biggest employers. Edgar Bass was a German immigrant and an entrepreneur adjacent to the Foundry. The people of the Lulu Hopping House typify Albuquerque's roots in the railroad and the working class's westward movement with the coast-to-coast industrialization of the United States.
