= Charles A. Bottger House =

Historic house in New Mexico, United States

- U.S. National Register of Historic Places
- NM State Register of Cultural Properties
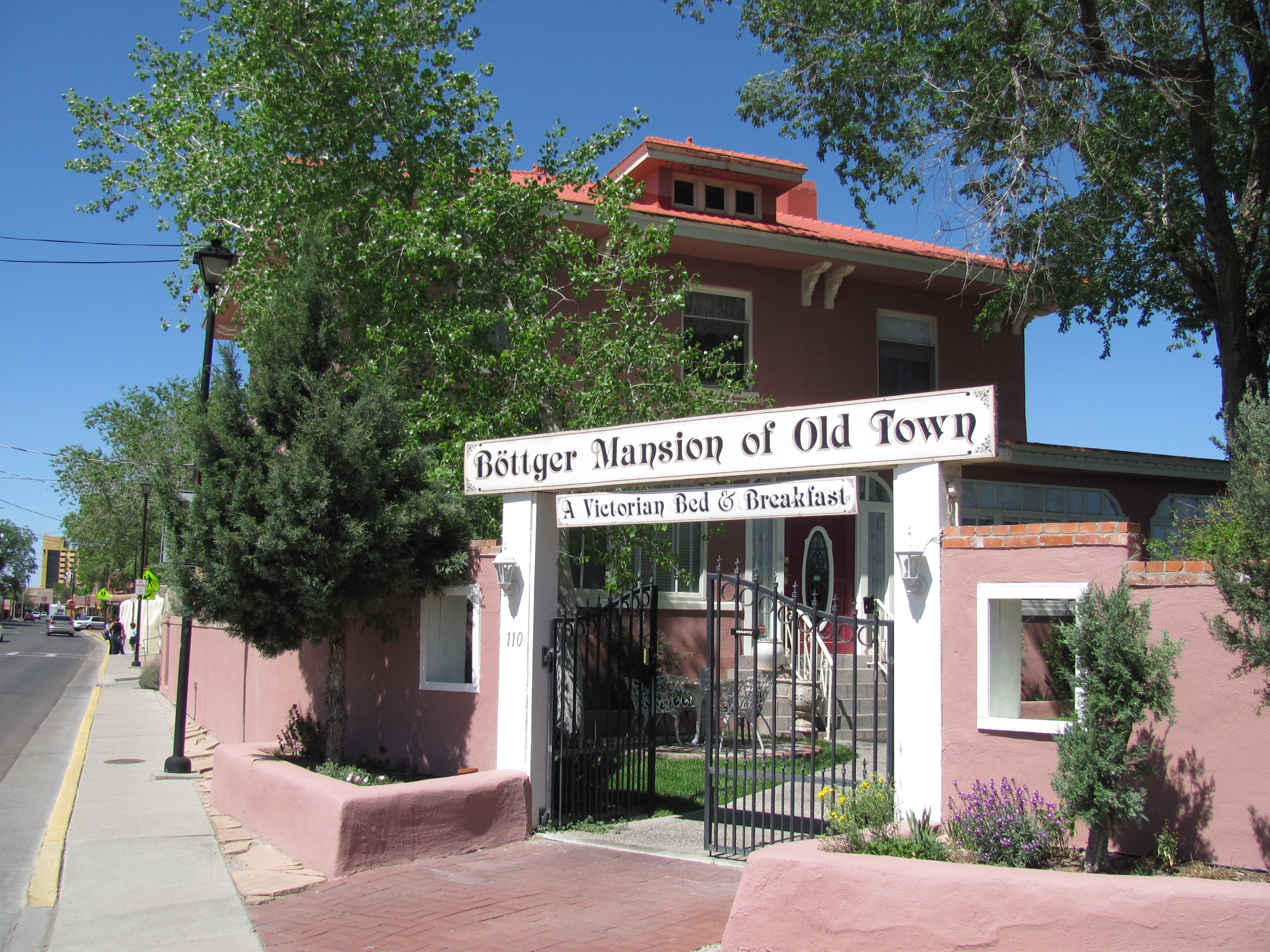
- Bottger House, May 2010

- Location within New Mexico Location within the United States
- Location: 110 San Felipe NW, Albuquerque, New Mexico
- Coordinates: 35°5′41″N 106°40′8″W
- Area: 0.5 acres (0.20 ha)
- Built: 1912
- Architect: Edward Buxton Cristy
- Architectural style: American Foursquare
- NRHP reference No.: 83001615
- NMSRCP No.: 751

Significant dates
- Added to NRHP: March 7, 1983
- Designated NMSRCP: October 26, 1979

The Charles A. Bottger House is a historic house in the Old Town neighborhood of Albuquerque, New Mexico. It is listed on the New Mexico State Register of Cultural Properties and the National Register of Historic Places. The house was built in 1911–12 for Charles A. Bottger (1872–1914), a German-American businessman who moved to Old Town from Rutherford, New Jersey in 1889. The house was designed by local architect Edward Buxton Cristy, who was also responsible for the remodeling of Hodgin Hall in 1908.

Built in the American Foursquare style, it is a square, two-and-a-half-story building of balloon frame construction with a shallow hipped roof. A glassed-in sun porch wraps around the south and east sides of the house, while a smaller sun porch projects from the north (rear) facade. The wide eaves are supported by paired Italianate brackets and the metal tile roof is punctuated by dormers on three sides. Inside, the house was equipped with modern conveniences like speaking tubes and a dumbwaiter and also has a notable pressed metal ceiling.

The house is currently operated as a bed and breakfast.
