= Algo Henderson =

Algo Donmyer Henderson

President, Antioch College
- In office 1936–1947
- Preceded by: Arthur Ernest Morgan
- Succeeded by: Douglas McGregor

Personal details
- Born: April 26, 1897 Solomon, Kansas
- Died: October 20, 1988 (aged 91) Kaiser Permanente, Oakland, California
- Known for: Antioch College shared governance

Algo Donmyer Henderson (April 26, 1897 – October 20, 1988) was an educator, administrator, and author. He served as the president of Antioch College and is associated with their shared governance model. He was a chief planner of the State University of New York.

== Early life and career ==
Algo Donmyer Henderson was born in 1897 in Solomon, Kansas, where his family lived on a farm. He was a second lieutenant in World War I. Henderson worked several jobs to fund his higher education, and attended five colleges. He graduated with University of Kansas law and Harvard University business degrees.

In 1936, he became the president of Antioch College, a Yellow Springs, Ohio, experimental college He had been the executive vice president and acting president from 1934 until then. At 39, he was among the youngest American college presidents. He started a bronze foundry at Antioch to teach students small business management. Henderson is credited for Antioch's shared governance between faculty and administrators.

In the late 1940s, Henderson became the associate director of the commission for creating a state university in New York State, leading to the State University of New York and public community colleges. In 1947, Henderson left Antioch's presidency to serve New York State as the associate education commissioner until 1950. Upon his resignation, he joined the University of Michigan as a professor and began the first U.S. doctoral program for higher education administration.

He retired from Michigan in 1967 whereupon he and his wife moved to Orinda, California, when she became dean of admissions at California College of Arts and Crafts. Henderson joined the University of California, Berkeley as a research educator.

== Death ==
Henderson died of cancer on October 20, 1988, in Kaiser Permanente at the age of 91. He was living in Orinda, California. He had written 14 books on education.

== Personal life ==
Henderson married Anne Cristy, daughter of the architect Edward Buxton Cristy. She died in 1962. At the time of his death, his wife was Jean Glidden. They met in Ann Arbor, Michigan, where she earned her doctorate in 1967, and married in 1963. Henderson had a son, daughter, and stepdaughter.
