= Hodgin Hall =

- U.S. National Register of Historic Places
- NM State Register of Cultural Properties
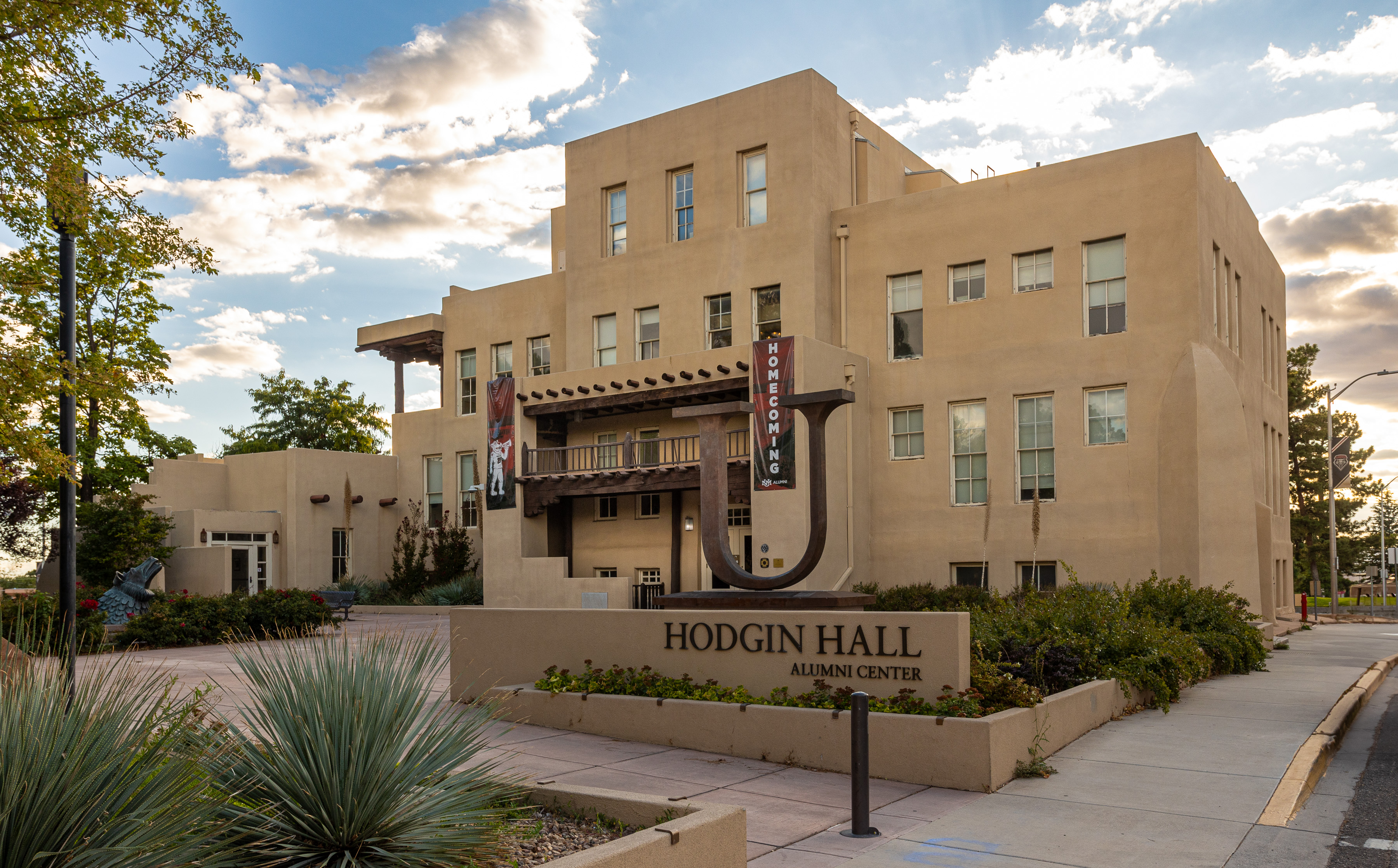
- Homecoming, 2024

- Location within New Mexico Location within the United States
- Location: 1889 Central Ave. NE; Albuquerque, New Mexico
- Coordinates: 35°04′54″N 106°37′31″W
- Built: 1892
- Architect: Jesse M. Wheelock; Edward Buxton Cristy
- Architectural style: Richardsonian Romanesque (pre-1908); Pueblo Revival
- NRHP reference No.: 78001803
- NMSRCP No.: 336

Significant dates
- Added to NRHP: January 30, 1978
- Designated NMSRCP: July 26, 1974

Hodgin Hall, previously known at various times as the University Building, Main Building, or Administration Building, is a historic building on the University of New Mexico campus in Albuquerque, New Mexico. Completed in 1892, it was the first building constructed on the UNM campus and the university's only building for almost a decade. The building was originally designed by Jesse Wheelock in the Richardsonian Romanesque style, but structural problems with the building's roof gave university president William Tight the opportunity to have it remodeled in his preferred Pueblo Revival style in 1908.

The remodeled building features stepped, asymmetrical massing, stuccoed walls, vigas, and other details characteristic of traditional Pueblo and mission architecture. As one of the first Pueblo Revival buildings in New Mexico, Hodgin Hall helped to establish the style both at the university and regionally. The building was slated for demolition in the 1970s but was preserved and restored through an alumni fundraising effort. Since 1983, it has housed the university's Alumni Association and Alumni Relations offices. Hodgin Hall is listed in both New Mexico State Register of Cultural Properties and the National Register of Historic Places.

== History ==
=== Original building ===
The University of New Mexico was established in February 1889 by an act of the territorial legislature, which specified that the campus would be located on high ground north of Railroad Avenue. Later that year, a remote plot of land on the East Mesa was acquired for that purpose. The newly assembled board of regents then set about planning the university's first building, which was to be a three-story brick building containing classrooms, offices, a laboratory, and an assembly room. Jesse M. Wheelock of Albuquerque was chosen as the architect in 1890 after an open call for proposals, and the building was completed at a cost of $26,000.

The University Building opened at the start of the fall term in 1892 and served as the university's only facility for nearly a decade. As the campus grew, it became known as the Main Building and then the Administration Building. Problems were soon evident. The building's extremely isolated location on top of the mesa left it exposed to strong winds from the west, which blew out window panes and generated large, unforeseen loads on the massive roof structure. By 1901, the exterior brick walls were noticeably bulging and the top floor was reinforced with iron rods at the recommendation of local architect Edward Buxton Cristy. The gables, chimneys, and roof required repairs again in 1904.

In my opinion, the roof is too heavy for the building ... I see nothing at the present moment to cause alarm, but there is certainly room for a reasonable question as to the results if a severe storm should move the main truss that really supports the whole roof.

— Edward Cristy, 1904

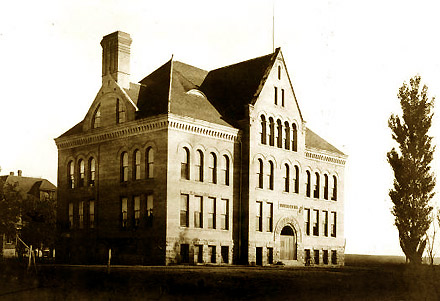
The Administration Building in 1904, prior to remodeling

=== Remodeling ===
Meanwhile, university president William G. Tight was experimenting with an architectural style based on the traditional forms and materials of New Mexico's Pueblos and Spanish missions. Between 1905 and 1906, Tight oversaw the construction of a new boiler plant, two dormitories, and a fraternity meeting house called the Estufa, all designed in the Pueblo Revival style. The structural problems with the Administration Building gave Tight the opportunity to remodel it to fit his vision.

Cristy was tasked with converting the Romanesque brick building to the Pueblo style. The pitched roof of the building was removed, arched window and door openings were squared off, the brick was stuccoed over, and vigas, buttresses, and other Pueblo details were added. The main entrance was also moved from the west side of the building to the east side, facing what would become a small quadrangle surrounded by the Administration Building, Rodey Hall, Sara Raynolds Hall, and the Library. The project was completed in 1908 at a cost of $15,000.

=== Later history ===
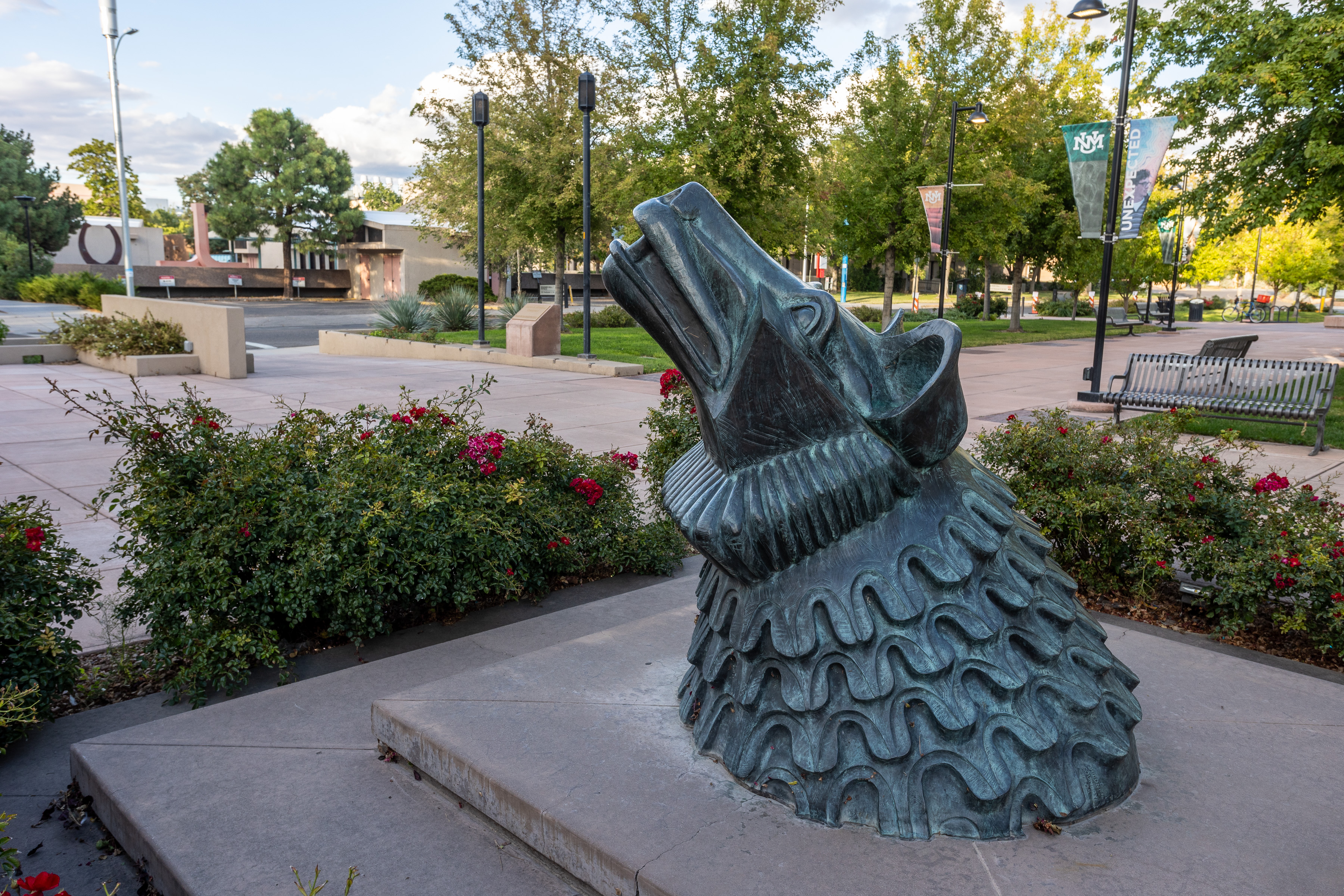
Lobo statue in front of Hodgin

UNM built a new administration building, Scholes Hall, in 1934. In 1936 the old building was renamed Hodgin Hall after Charles C. Hodgin, a member of the university's first graduating class of 1894 who later became an administrator. By the 1970s, the building was in disrepair and was scheduled for demolition in order to build a new loop road around campus. However, a group of alumni intervened and organized a successful fundraising campaign to restore the building. Under the supervision of architect Joseph Burwinkle, the restoration project was completed in 1983 at a cost of $1.4 million. Hodgin Hall was added to the New Mexico State Register of Cultural Properties in 1974 and the National Register of Historic Places in 1978.

The building currently houses the UNM Alumni Association and Alumni Relations office, as well as history-related exhibits. It was renovated again in 2010–11.

== Architecture ==
Hodgin Hall is a three-story brick bearing-wall structure with a full basement. It was originally designed in the Richardsonian Romanesque style popular in the 1890s, with red brick exterior walls, arched windows and doors, stone trim, and a steeply pitched roof with intersecting hip and gable framing. Following the 1908 remodeling, the building features Pueblo Revival architecture with a flat roof, asymmetrical, terraced massing, vigas, buttresses, and porches. The brick walls and window arches were stuccoed over, though the arches are still visible from the inside.

Hodgin Hall in its post-1908 configuration is architecturally significant as one of the earliest Pueblo Revival buildings in New Mexico, helping to codify a style that would come to define the UNM campus and find widespread popularity in Albuquerque, Santa Fe, and the surrounding region. Along with the Estufa, Hodgin Hall is one of the oldest surviving examples of Pueblo Revival architecture.
