= Sara Raynolds Hall =

- U.S. National Register of Historic Places
- NM State Register of Cultural Properties
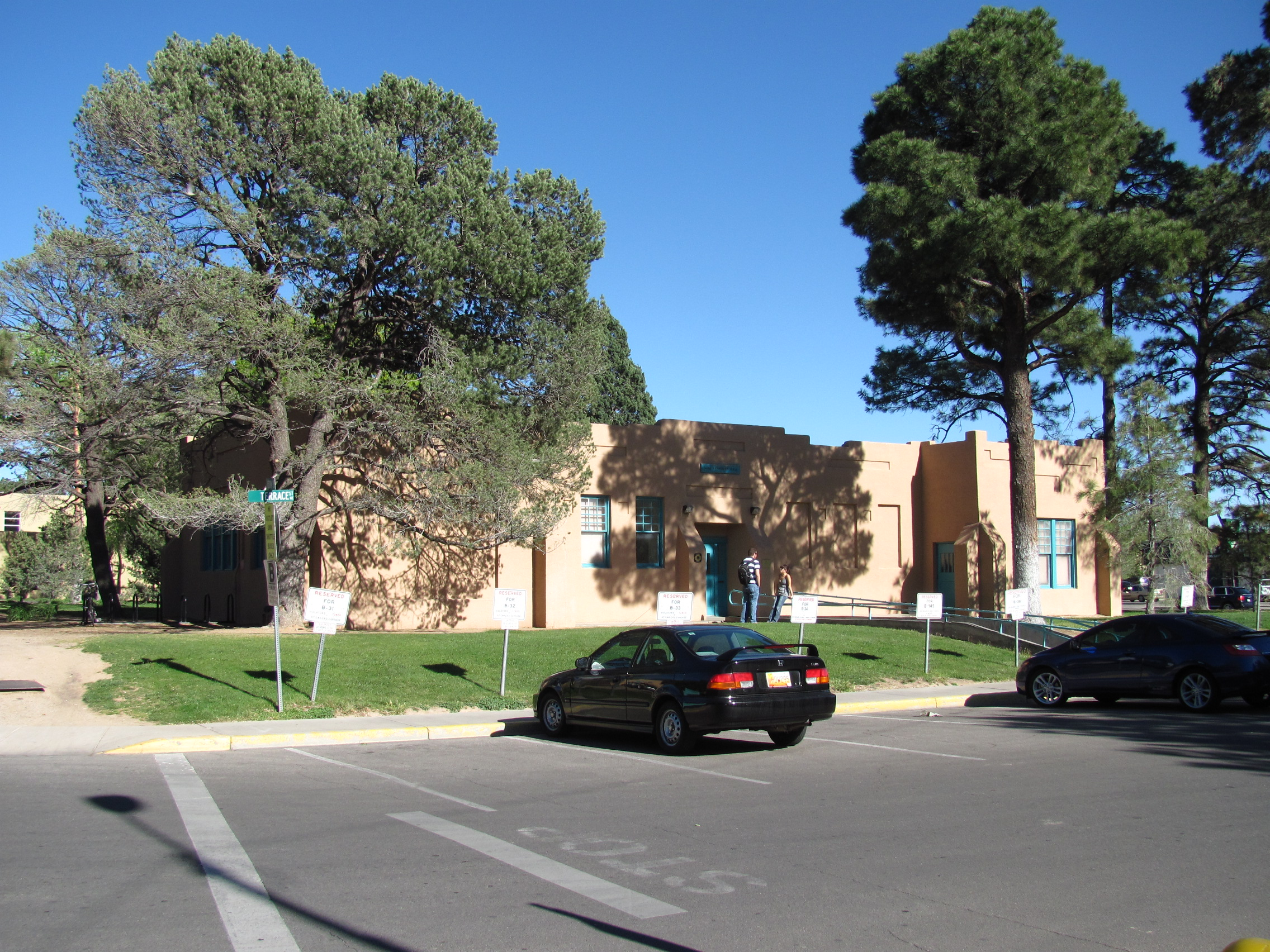
- Sara Raynolds Hall, May 2010

- Location within New Mexico Location within the United States
- Location: 2001 Central Ave. NE; Albuquerque, New Mexico
- Coordinates: 35°04′53″N 106°37′26″W
- Built: 1921; 105 years ago
- Architect: Edward Buxton Cristy
- Architectural style: Pueblo Revival
- NRHP reference No.: 88001544
- NMSRCP No.: 1455

Significant dates
- Added to NRHP: September 22, 1988
- Designated NMSRCP: July 8, 1988

Sara Raynolds Hall is a historic building on the University of New Mexico campus in Albuquerque, New Mexico. Completed in 1921, it originally housed the university's home economics department. The building was privately funded by local citizens, including the $16,000 construction cost as well as several thousand dollars' worth of equipment. One of the largest donors was Joshua Raynolds, whose mother was the building's namesake.

The building was designed by Arno K. Leupold with Edward B. Cristy as the supervising on-site architect. Cristy designed the Pueblo style remodel of Hodgin Hall in 1908. As with nearly all subsequent buildings on campus, Sara Raynolds Hall also employed the Pueblo style. It is a one-story, brick bearing wall structure with a beige stucco exterior. The building was added to the New Mexico State Register of Cultural Properties and the National Register of Historic Places in 1988.
