= Art Annex =

- U.S. National Register of Historic Places
- NM State Register of Cultural Properties
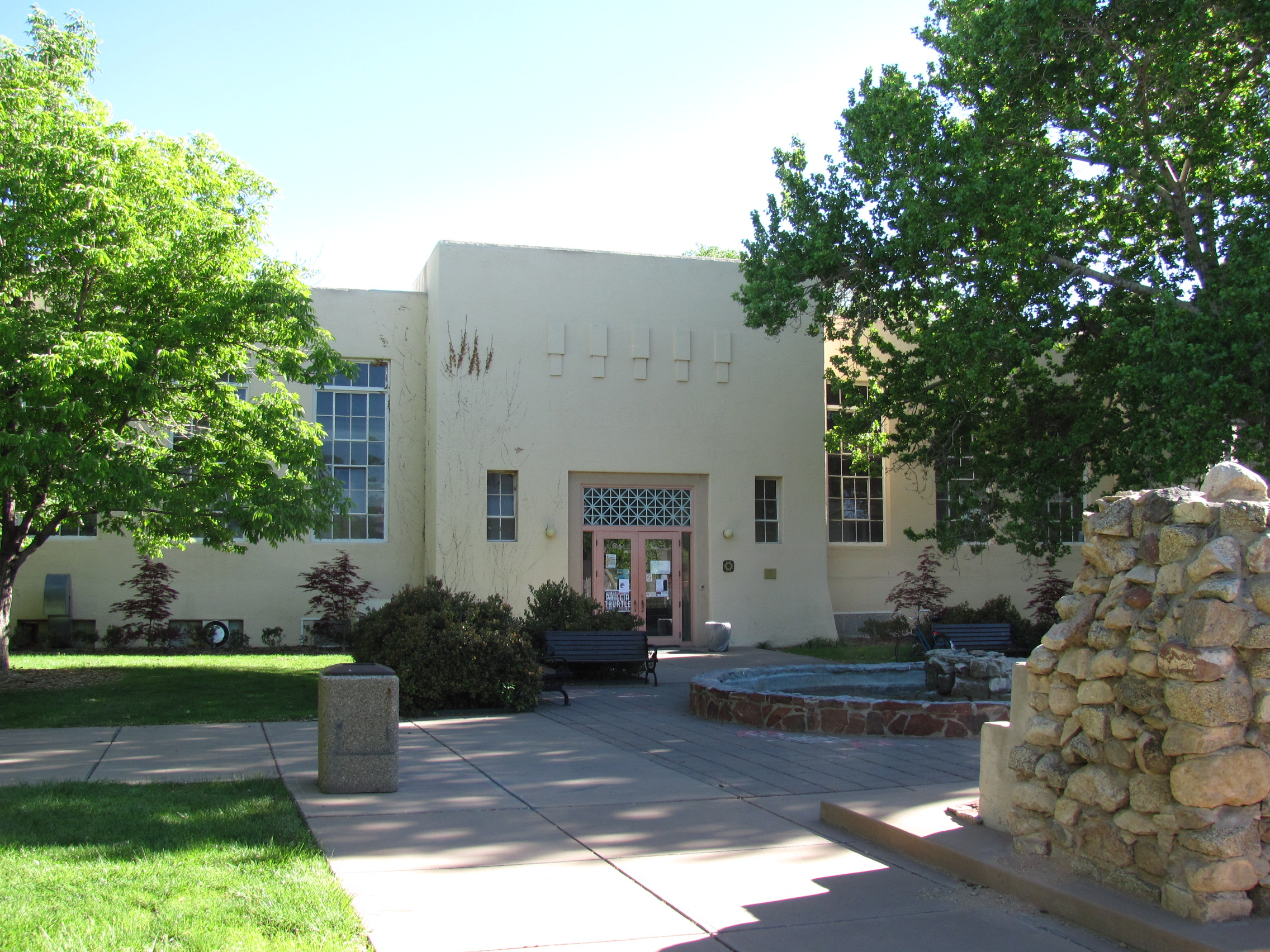
- Art Annex, May 2010

- Location within New Mexico Location within the United States
- Location: 1901 Central Ave. NE; Albuquerque, New Mexico
- Coordinates: 35°04′53″N 106°37′29″W
- Built: 1926
- Architect: Trost & Trost; Elson H. Norris
- Architectural style: Pueblo Revival
- NRHP reference No.: 88001540
- NMSRCP No.: 417

Significant dates
- Added to NRHP: September 22, 1988
- Designated NMSRCP: October 31, 1975

The Art Annex is a historic building on the campus of the University of New Mexico in Albuquerque, New Mexico. Built in 1926, it originally served as the university's library. The building was designed by Trost & Trost and Elson H. Norris and features a Mayan-influenced hybrid form of Pueblo Revival architecture. It was listed in the New Mexico State Register of Cultural Properties in 1975 and the National Register of Historic Places in 1988.

== History ==
The university's library collection was originally housed in Hodgin Hall, but had outgrown that space by the 1920s. A new, dedicated library building was constructed on the site of Hadley Hall, an earlier university building that burned down in 1910. The new library was designed by the El Paso firm of Trost & Trost in collaboration with local architect Elson H. Norris and was completed in 1926 at a cost of $42,000. However, the library collection continued to grow rapidly and exceeded the capacity of the building after only a few years. In 1938 the new, much larger Zimmerman Library was completed, and the old library was remodeled into classroom and studio space using Works Progress Administration funding. The building was remodeled again in 1984–5, and currently houses graduate studios for Master of Fine Arts candidates in painting, photography, printmaking, and experimental art and technology.

== Architecture ==
The Art Annex is a single story (with basement), flat-roofed building of brick bearing wall construction. Built during a transitional period in UNM's architectural history, it incorporates elements from a number of different styles including Pueblo Revival, Beaux-Arts, modernist, and Mayan. The building features a symmetrical, classically organized facade with banks of tall hopper windows to supply light to the interior reading areas. The strongly battered exterior walls are stuccoed and decorated with stylized vigas and other simple geometric elements. The original plans also included a curvilinear Mission style parapet which was never built.
