= Estufa =

- U.S. National Register of Historic Places
- NM State Register of Cultural Properties
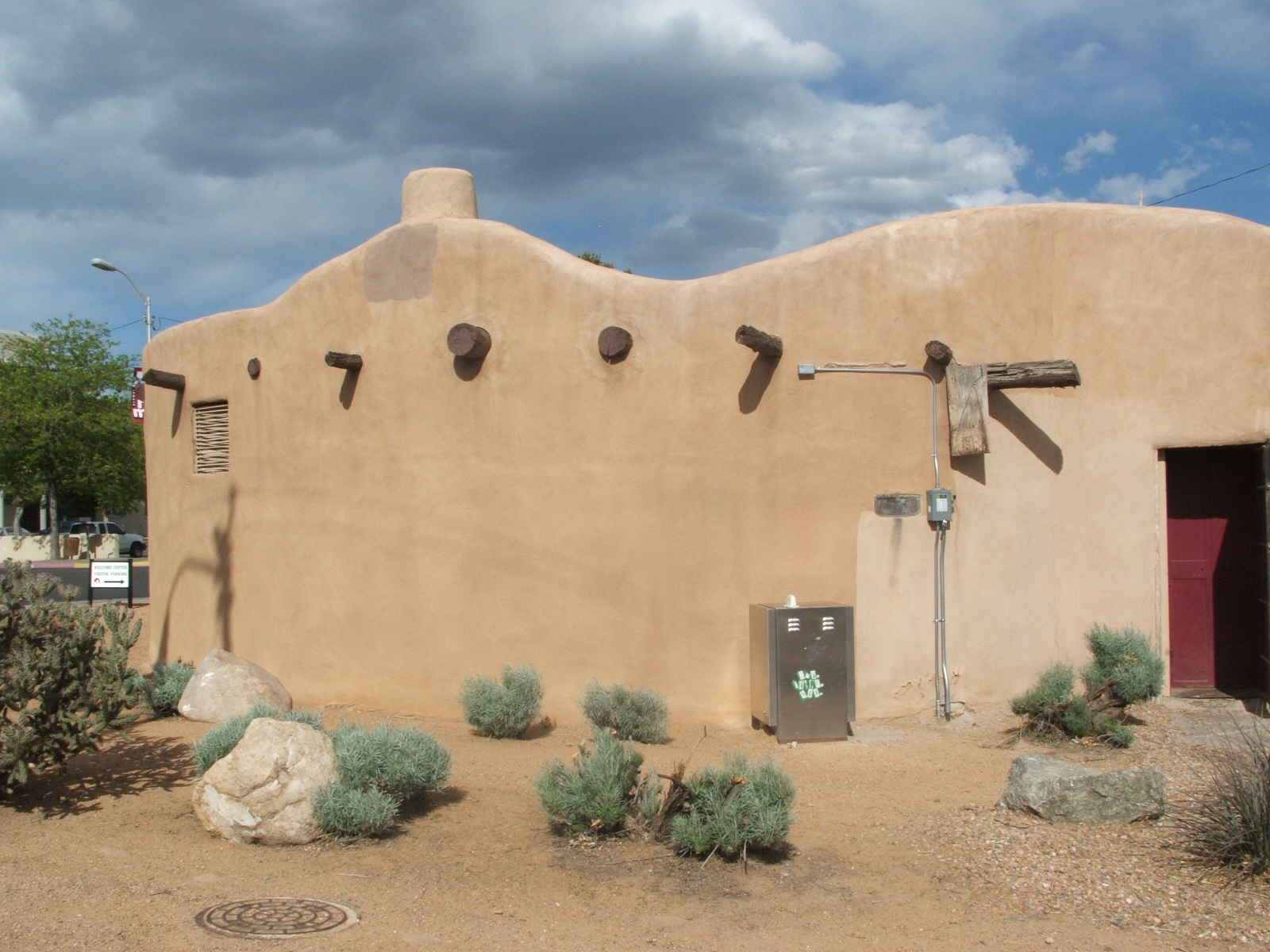

- Location within New Mexico Location within the United States
- Location: Southeast corner of University Boulevard and Dr. Martin Luther King Boulevard, Albuquerque, NM
- Coordinates: 35°5′2.00″N 106°37′32.84″W
- Built: 1908
- Architect: Charles Lembke & members of the Tri-Alpha fraternity, Edward Buxton Cristy, UNM President William G. Tight
- Architectural style: Pueblo Revival
- MPS: New Mexico Campus Buildings Built 1906–1937 TR
- NRHP reference No.: 88001542
- NMSRCP No.: 1412

Significant dates
- Added to NRHP: September 22, 1988
- Designated NMSRCP: January 7, 1988

The Estufa is a historic structure on the University of New Mexico campus in Albuquerque, New Mexico. It was built in 1907–08 by a local social fraternity and has served since 1915 as the primary meeting location of the university's Pi Kappa Alpha chapter. The building's history is steeped in fraternity lore and supposedly no woman has ever seen its interior. It is listed in both the New Mexico State Register of Cultural Properties and the National Register of Historic Places.

The Estufa is modeled after a kiva, a ceremonial meeting place used by the Pueblo people. It has thick adobe walls and contains a single windowless room with seating around the edges. Construction of the building was guided by university president William G. Tight, who promoted the use of Pueblo Revival architecture on campus. The Estufa was one of the first buildings in New Mexico to employ this style.

== Name ==
An estufa [Sp., a stove, a warm room. Cf. Stove] is an assembly room in a dwelling of the Pueblo Indians (i.e. a kiva), per Webster's Revised Unabridged Dictionary, 1998.

== History ==
The Estufa was built in 1907–08 by the local social fraternity Alpha Alpha Alpha, previously known as the Yum Yum Society. The project received support from university president William G. Tight, who was interested in strengthening the Greek system on campus. At the same time, Tight had been working to promote Pueblo Revival architecture at the university and had already overseen construction of two new dormitories and a boiler plant in the Pueblo style. The structural plan was approved by architect Edward Buxton Cristy. Under this influence, the Tri-Alphas built their meeting room in the form of a kiva or "estufa," a traditional feature of Pueblo architecture.

Ground was broken on the project in January 1907, though the work evidently proceeded slowly and it was not finished until April 1908. The U.N.M. Weekly student newspaper reported that month that

The most unique fraternity house in the world has just been completed on the campus of the University. It is modeled after the Indian fashion, and is in fact, an almost exact counterpart of the San Domingo estufas.
The house consists of one large elliptical room, with no windows. The entrance is a large exterior staircase, which ascends to the roof, from which, through a trap-door, steps lead down into the interior. Inside is a large fire place, of true Indian design, while the rafters and timbers above add to the effect. The whole is coated with cement, and makes an admirable imitation of the real estufa.

The Tri-Alphas held their first meeting in the Estufa on February 20, 1908, while the building was still unfinished. In 1915, Alpha Alpha Alpha became the Beta Delta chapter of Pi Kappa Alpha, the university's first national fraternity, and the Estufa has continued to serve as the chapter's primary meeting location for nearly 100 years. During its long history as a fraternity council room, the Estufa has been involved in numerous pranks and has been broken into or vandalized many times, often by the rival Sigma Chi fraternity. The building is accessible only to members of Pi Kappa Alpha, and according to fraternity lore no woman has ever seen its interior.

The Estufa has survived both accidental and intentional vehicular collisions as well as "attempts to destroy it with fire, dynamite, water and other weapons" according to an Albuquerque Journal article from 1952. In 1947 alone, the building was set on fire four times. It was also damaged by an accidental gas explosion in 1958 that left five people injured. In the 1960s, the building seemed doomed by a University Boulevard widening project, but city planners ultimately chose a road alignment further to the west that kept the Estufa out of harm's way. It was added to the New Mexico State Register of Cultural Properties and the National Register of Historic Places in 1988.

== Architecture ==
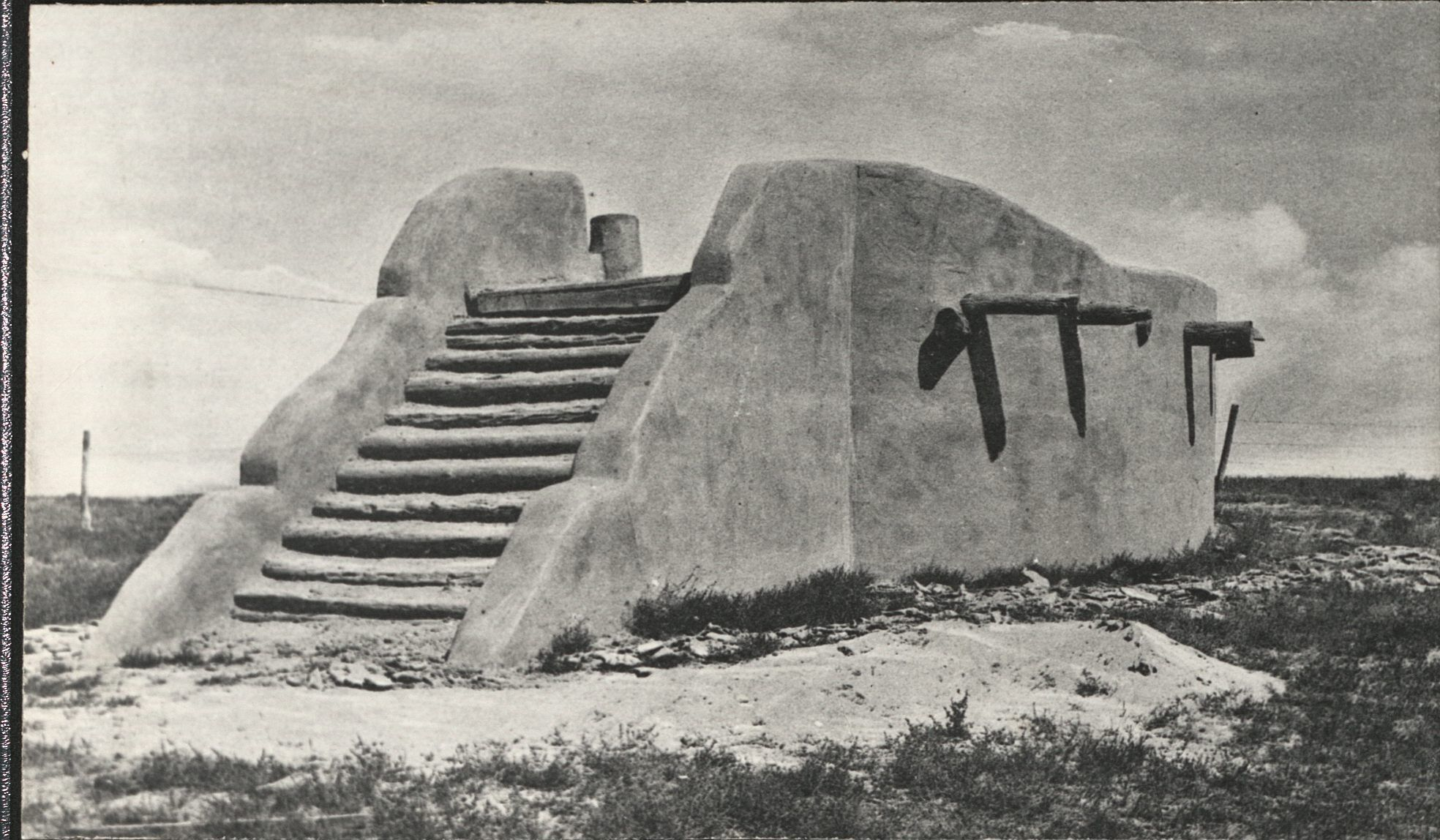
Early photograph. Inscription on back says "1906."

The Estufa is an elliptical, one-story building loosely modeled after a kiva at Santo Domingo Pueblo. As such, it was one of the earliest expressions of the Pueblo Revival style in New Mexico, and is the oldest surviving example at UNM. The walls are adobe and are approximately 14 inches (36 cm) thick. The building was originally accessed via an external staircase and roof trapdoor, but this arrangement has since been replaced by a more conventional door. The interior of the Estufa contains a single windowless room, approximately 500 square feet (46 m^{2}) in area, which has been described as a pit with seating around the edge.

Despite the prevalence of Pueblo style architecture at UNM, the Estufa is one of only two buildings on campus actually made out of adobe. The other is the Naval Science Building designed by John Gaw Meem.
