= Annie Rockfellow =

American architect (1866–1954)

- Born: March 12, 1866; Mount Morris, New York, U.S.
- Died: January 17, 1954 (aged 87); Santa Barbara, California, U.S.
- Education: Massachusetts Institute of Technology
- Occupation: Architect
- Buildings: El Conquistador Hotel (1928)

Annie Graham Rockfellow (March 12, 1866 – January 17, 1954) was an influential and prolific architect active in Tucson, Arizona during the first half of the 20th century.

== Life and work ==
Born in Mount Morris, New York on March 12, 1866, Annie was the daughter of Samuel L. and Julia Lucinda (Conkey) Rockfellow. She studied at the Massachusetts Institute of Technology receiving a special certificate in 1887. In 1905, she moved to Tombstone, Arizona to care for her father, Samuel, then living with his son, John A. Rockfellow. By 1916, she had moved to Tucson and worked for the firm of architect Henry O. Jaastad from 1916 to 1938 as chief designer. She was a faculty member at the University of Arizona from 1895 to 1897 and a member of numerous Tucson civic clubs including: American Pen Women, Arizona Archaeological and Historical Society, Tucson Natural History Society and the Tucson Fine Arts Association.

She visited the San Diego California-Panama–Pacific International Exposition which affected her design style. Her buildings relied and were inspired by regional styles including Pueblo Revival, and Spanish Mission Revival. She created some of Tucson's most prominent buildings including the El Conquistador Hotel and Safford School.

Rockfellow moved to Santa Barbara, California in 1938 and died in 1954 at the age of 87.

== In Her Own Words ==
The following was written for the Archives of the Arizona Historical and Pioneer Society, Tucson, Arizona by Annie Graham Rockfellow:

It was in the 19th century that I made a start towards being an Arizona Pioneer and becoming eligible to the Arizona Historical and Pioneer Society, but no one, least of all my new-born self, knew on a certain March 12 that I was headed that way. In fact, Arizona was nearly as much of a stranger as I, at that time, having been organized only a few years before. My birthplace was a thriving town in Western New York of about 3000 inhabitants, called Mount Morris and organized in 1794. I remember that date because I rode in the parade when the one hundredth anniversary was celebrated in 1894.

Perhaps the first concrete remembrance of my babyhood was, at the age of three, a trip to New York with my parents to visit my Aunt Mary for whose daughter I was named. My Aunt Mary was a sister-in-law of George Graham, the publisher of Graham's Magazine, which accounts for the Graham in my cousin Annie's name and mine. I never saw the cousin. She died before my advent in North America. I dimly remember "Uncle George and Aunt Lizzie Graham" on that early visit, also my cousin Col. Harry Rockefeller, who lost his right arm in the civil war. In my fifth year my father sold his mercantile establishment in Mount Morris and engaged in the nursery business in Rochester, N.Y., being advised to live an outdoor like to strengthen his vitality.

I recall playing among the packing boxes in the nursery, wading in the creek that ran through the nursery property, seeing father cut the yard grass with a scythe, and my brother with a powder-blackened face caused by a Fourth-of-July cannon. And SNOW! Real winters, when I was well wrapped and placed on my Christmas sled and drawn by my father and brother to the Mission Sunday School Christmas Tree. When I was six we all went south for my mother's health. We stopped in New York and Washington and Richmond. At the hotel in Washington I was much impressed with seeing Tom Thumb and his theatrical company at special tables in the big dining room. Two occurrences stand uppermost in my memory of Edenton, N.C. where we stopped during the winter months, -- starting in school and seeing a murderer hanged! The school was kept by two of four maiden sisters. Their home was historically interesting having been built for the bride of the first governor of the state. The house was of Colonial design and the oak paneling in the main rooms was brought from England in a sailing vessel.

The school room was one of the old slave houses, in the second story reached by an outside stairway. there was much whitewash on the walls both outside and in. The desks were placed against the walls with continuous benches. When studying you faced the wall but turned around on your bench for recitations. The study of arithmetic was started with "sums" in those days. When the time came for our return to New York state a party was given me by the teachers in their beautiful rose garden and supper was served in the large paneled dining room. One little boy had to come to the party barefooted because he had six toes on one foot and could not get shoes to fit. Of course I would remember that!

Many, many years later some of our friends went to Edenton and there met the two remaining sisters who, learning my address, sent me a box of roses from this self-same garden. Part of the trip home was by boat, from Norfolk to New York, and I recall my brother talking me, at Norfolk, to see men fishing for oysters. Back in Rochester I attended private schools, roamed about the city and on the beaches of Lake Ontario, in summer; skated, and built snow "igloos" in winter. The fall of '76 my father took me to the Centennial Exhibition in Philadelphia and not a thing escaped me from the making of pins to the big Corliss engine, at the time the largest engine in the world.

In 1878 I spent a summer in Saratoga Springs where my mother went for the benefits of the spring waters, and that autumn we returned to live in Mount Morris in the beautiful valley of the Genesee. Followed three years of hotel life, six years of boarding school and Boston Tech, -- this for the study of architecture, -- and six years of architectural business in rochester. In the meantime, we began to know Arizona, and rather better than the average easterner. My brother, seeking health and adventure, introduced us by letter and description. His life there is taken care of in Pioneer Archives and in his book "The Log of an Arizona Trail Blazer." While he was acting as "professor" at the University of Arizona he obtained an appointment for me on the faculty, and I came in 1895, but even then I did not realize that it would be the beginning of my eligibility for the Historical and Pioneer Society.

After two years my life was in the east again, "architecting" traveling by bicycle in Continental Europe and Great Britain, and keeping house for my father after my mother's death in 1900. I might mention that my trip abroad was aided by revenue from cattle investments in Arizona, at the N.Y. Ranch in Cochise County. Father at the age of 79 retired from business and went to Tombstone to be with my brother and his family, and I was in an architect's offices and my own in Detroit and Buffalo, but arrived in Tombstone in 1909, and remained until my father's release from months of physical failure. His funeral and burial were in Mount Morris in 1911.

You know "The cactus gets under the skin", and I was happy, after four winters of sleet and ice and sore-throat, to arrive once more in sunny Tucson. It seemed that I might stay two months to visit my brother and his wife and my two young nieces and nephew, but the months stretched into years, nine of them, before I went east to sell all but the cemetery lot and return. In the meantime I visited California during the winter of 1915-16, and in the spring became connected with the office at Architect H.O. Jaastad in Tucson, and, at the time of writing, December 1933, I am still in that office, principally as designer.

Some of the buildings in Tucson with which I have had the most personal touch are the Safford School, Southern Arizona Bank and Trust Co. building, Christian Science church, the first buildings of the Desert Sanatorium, El Conquistador Hotel, La Fonda Buen Provecho Inn, The Young Women's Christian Association building, and many residences within and without the city limits. In other parts of the state and New Mexico are more designs, mostly schools, The Allison-James school in Santa Fe, the Menaul School in Albuquerque. In Safford, Arizona, a hotel, church, and bank building. In Miami Ariz., a school, church, and Y.M.C.A., etc.

As a resident of Tucson I am an interested member of several clubs besides the Historical and Pioneer Society, among then The Archeological society, The Natural History society, The Fine Arts, The Daughters of the American Revolution, The business and Professional Women's Club, The Tucson branch of the National League of American Pen women, and a long time board member of the Y.W.C.A. and at present sponsor for their business girls group, the Otonka Circle. When business permits I spend some time each year with my brother and sister-in-law in cochise Stronghold, riding their horses, and climbing the mountains, and a part of the summers "doing something different" each year, but always including happy contacts with my nieces and nephews and their children in California, and when possible with those in Massachusetts. In the last ten or fifteen years I have visited Alaska, Hawaii, Panama, Cuba, Grand Canyon, Ariz.; Mesa Verde, Colorado; Santa Fe and Indian villages and ruins in New Mexico; Zion National Park and Bryce Canyon; Mexico; and have traveled by horse, rail, bus, boat, auto, and airplane, yet so far I have missed Roosevelt Dam, The Apache Trail. and a few other places. Here's Hoping! -- Also that the searcher in Pioneer archives will find more profitable reading than this.

== Major extant buildings ==
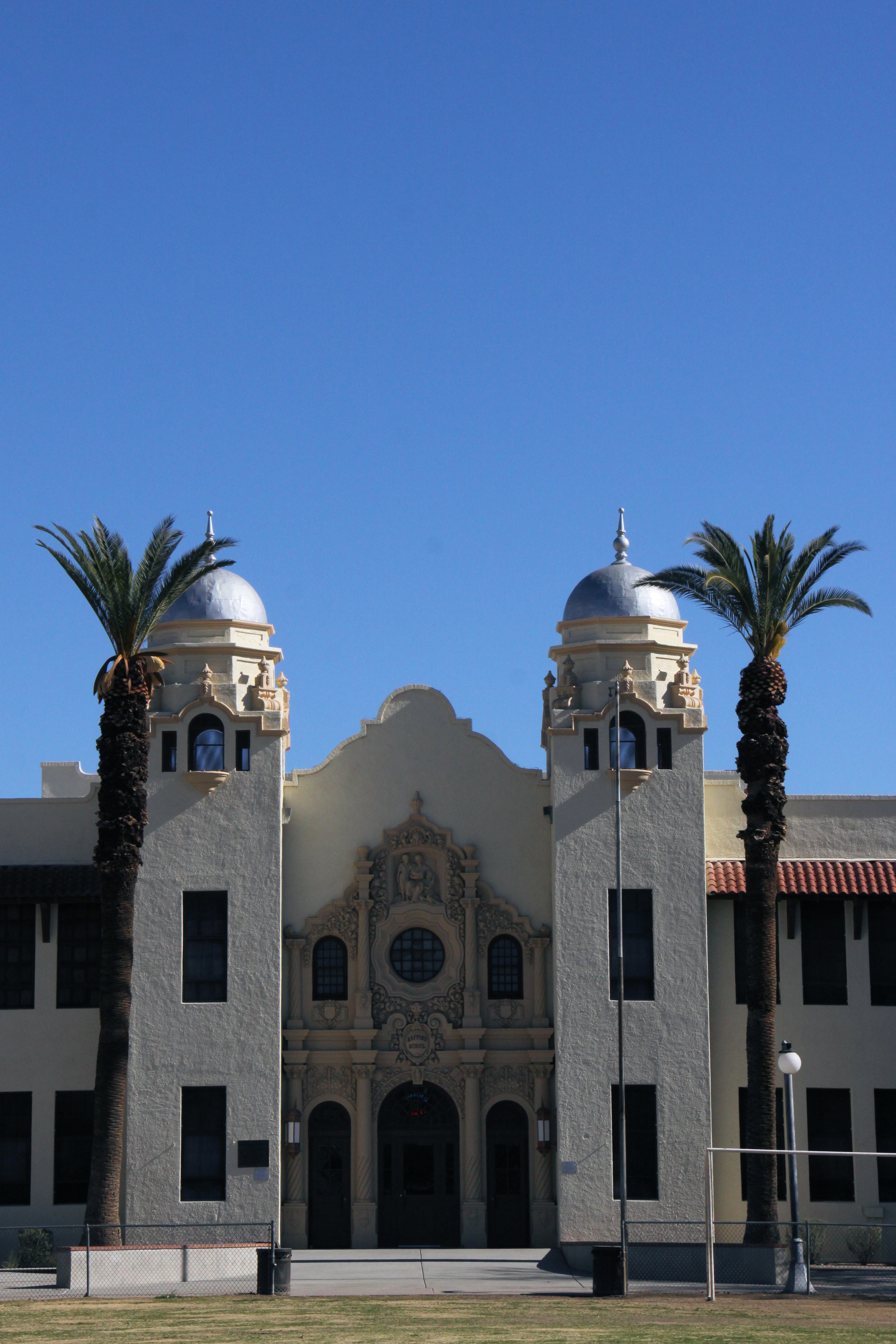
Safford School, 1918

- Safford School, (1918) (300 S. Fifth Ave., Tucson, AZ)
- Desert Sanitorium (Tucson Medical Center), (1926–29): Erickson House, Arizona Building, Patio Building, Water Tower, Court Buildings and Educational Buildings
- Young Women's Christian Association, (YWCA) (1929-1936) Tucson,
- Southern Arizona Bank and Trust Co., Downtown Tucson
- La Fonda Buen Provecho Inn, (1931) 1325 E. Speedway, Tucson, AZ,
- R.P. Boss House, Tucson, 1932
- Allison-James School, (1922–24) 433 Paseo de Peralta, Santa Fe, NM,
- Menaul School, Albuquerque, NM, (1919-1920)
- Casa Grande Women's Club, Casa Grande, Arizona 1923 (native stone)

== Buildings Attributed to Anne Graham Rockfellow ==
- YMCA, 38 Miami Ave., Miami, AZ, 1915
- Inspiration Grammar School, 929 Rose Rd., Miami, AZ, 1919
- Residence, Mr. Eric Wick, Tucson, AZ, 1920
- Schoolhouse and Teacher's residence, Amado, AZ, 1923
- Residence, George Martin, 202 E. Speedway, Tucson, AZ, 1923
- High School, Superior, AZ, 1924 [photo]
- Hospital, Apache Powder Co., Sixth St., Benson, AZ, 1924
- Girls' School, Lutheran Apache Mission, White River, AZ, 1924
- School for Lone Star District #20, Graham County, AZ, 1925
- Residence, W.E. Rudasill, Tucson, AZ, 1926
- Grade School, Benson, AZ, 1926
- St. Helen's Chapel, Oracle, AZ, 1927 [AHS PC 172 #96007]
- Residence, Mr. J.C. Wright, Safford, AZ 1927
- Residence, Caroline Marshall, east Broadway, Tucson, AZ, 1928 [AHS PC 172 #7069]
- Double residence, Mr. E.S. Jackson, Tucson, AZ 1928
- Mortuary Chapel, Reilly Undertaking, 102 E. Pennington, Tucson, AZ, 1929 and 1935 [photo]
- Residence, Hayward Hoyt, Broadway and Wilmot, Tucson, AZ, 1929 [photo]
- Residence, Mrs. A.W. Erickson, at the Desert Sanitarium (TMC), Tucson, AZ, 1929 and 1936
- Hotel, Safford, AZ, 1929
- Residence, R.P. Bass, Tanque Verde Rd., Tucson, AZ, 1932 [AHS PC 172 F12]
- Inspiration Home, Tucson, AZ, 1935No date known
- Arizona Children's Home, Tucson, AZ [organization history]
- Bank building, Safford, AZ
- Church, Miami, AZ
- Elementary school, St. David, AZ
- Four residences on Lee St., Tucson, AZ
- Indian Hospital at Sells, AZ
- Methodist Episcopal Church, Safford, AZ
- Pinal County Hospital, Florence, AZ
- Residence, Dr. V.G. Presson [Preston?], 1317 N. Stone, Tucson, AZ [demolished]
- Residence, Mrs. Hobart [Herbert?] Johnson, Erickson Dr. north of Grant Road, Tucson, AZ [possibly part of the Desert Sanatorium, see above] [AHS PC 172 #7066]
- Residence, Mrs. William P. Haynes, Tucson, AZ
- Residence, Warren Grossetta, 1645 E. Speedway, Tucson, AZ [demolished] [AHS PC 172 #95961]
- University Heights Elementary School, Tucson, AZ

== Demolished buildings ==
- El Conquistador Hotel (1928) Tucson, (Demolished)
- Hoyl House (1929)
- First Church of Christ Scientist, 904 N. Stone Ave., Tucson, AZ [demolished]

== Timeline of the life of Annie Graham Rockfellow ==
March 12, 1866, Born to Samuel and Julia Lucinda (Conkey) Rockfellow in Mt. Morris, NY. Lived in Mt. Morris, NY, Rochester, NY, New York City, Washington, DC, Richmond VA, Edenton, NC, and Saratoga Springs, NY.

1875–1878, Family moved back to Rochester, where she attended private schools and “roamed the city.” Decided to become an Architect.

1882–1885, Attended boarding school.

1885, Attended M.I.T., graduating in 1887 with a Diploma in Architecture.

1887–1893, Worked as draftsman for architect William C. Walker in Rochester, NY.

1895–1896, Faculty, University of Arizona, teaching English, Geography, U.S. History, and possibly drafting.

1897–1900, Moved back to NY again.

1898, Four-month tour of Great Britain and Europe on a bicycle, “studying architecture and enjoying the scenery.”

1898–1909, Private practice, in Mt. Morris, NY, Detroit, MI and Buffalo, NY.

1905, Her father Samuel Rockfellow moved to Tombstone, AZ.

1905, Article in January issue of Good Housekeeping entitled “The Nutshell.”

1909–1910, Moved to Tombstone, AZ to care for father.

1911–1915, Practicing in Western NY and “assisting in several offices.”

1915, Attended Panama–California Exposition, San Diego, CA.

1916–1938, Chief Architectural Designer for Henry O. Jaastad, Tucson Arizona.

1938, Retired and moved to Santa Barbara, CA.

1954, Died in Santa Barbara, CA; buried in Mt. Morris, NY.
