= Pyramidal cottage =

Square, hip-roofed house

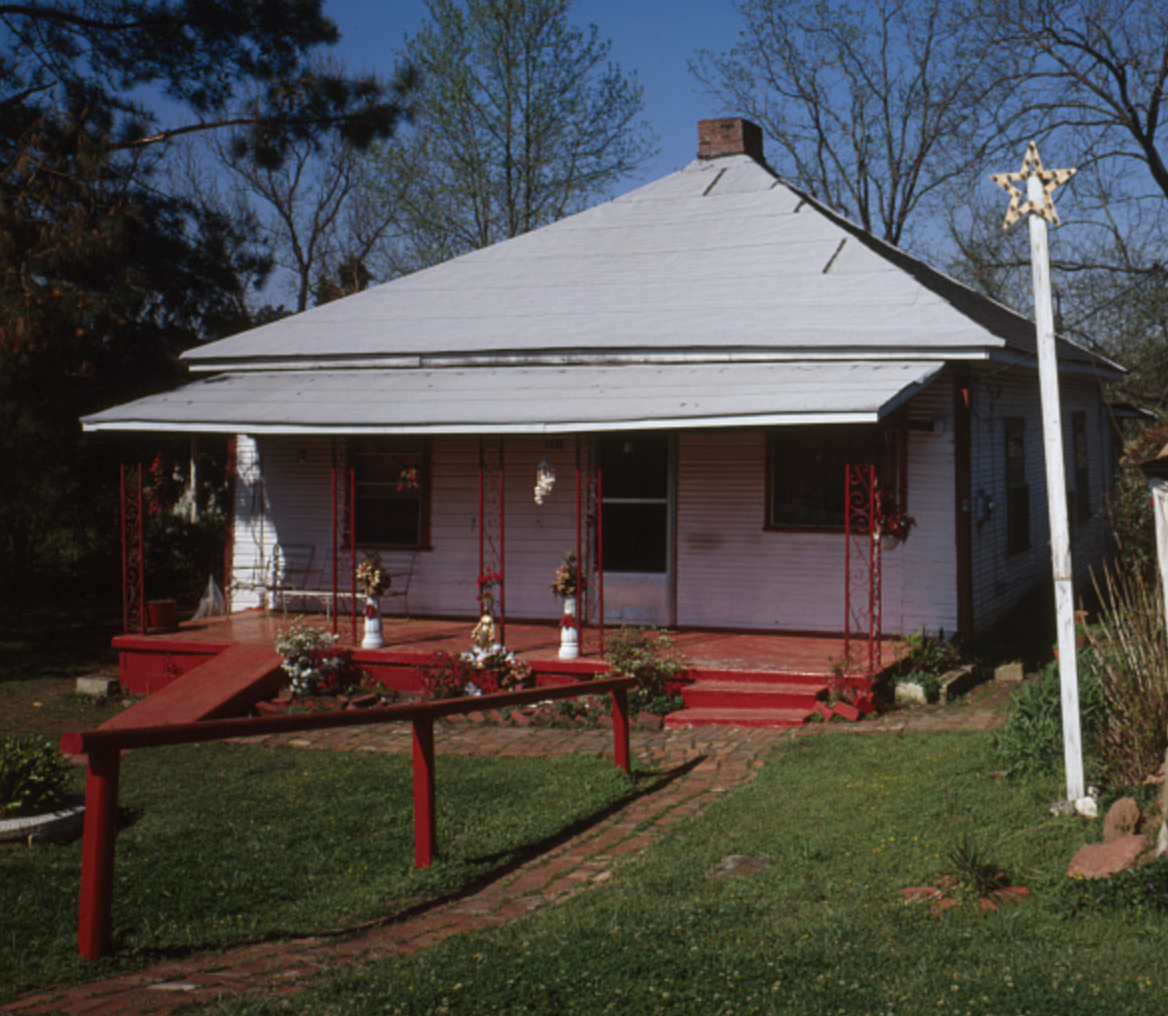
A pyramidal cottage at the Mulga Community, Birmingham, Alabama.

A pyramidal cottage is a roughly square, one-story, house with a hip roof. The hip roof over a square structure forms the characteristic pyramidal shape.

These are modest Folk Victorian homes built in the United States from the late 19th into the first half of the 20th Century. Classification of American architecture does not include a rigorous definition of pyramidal cottage; there are unmistakable examples, but there are variants which fit the description to degrees.

Alternative names include pyramidal house, pyramid cottage, and miner's cottage.

== Description ==
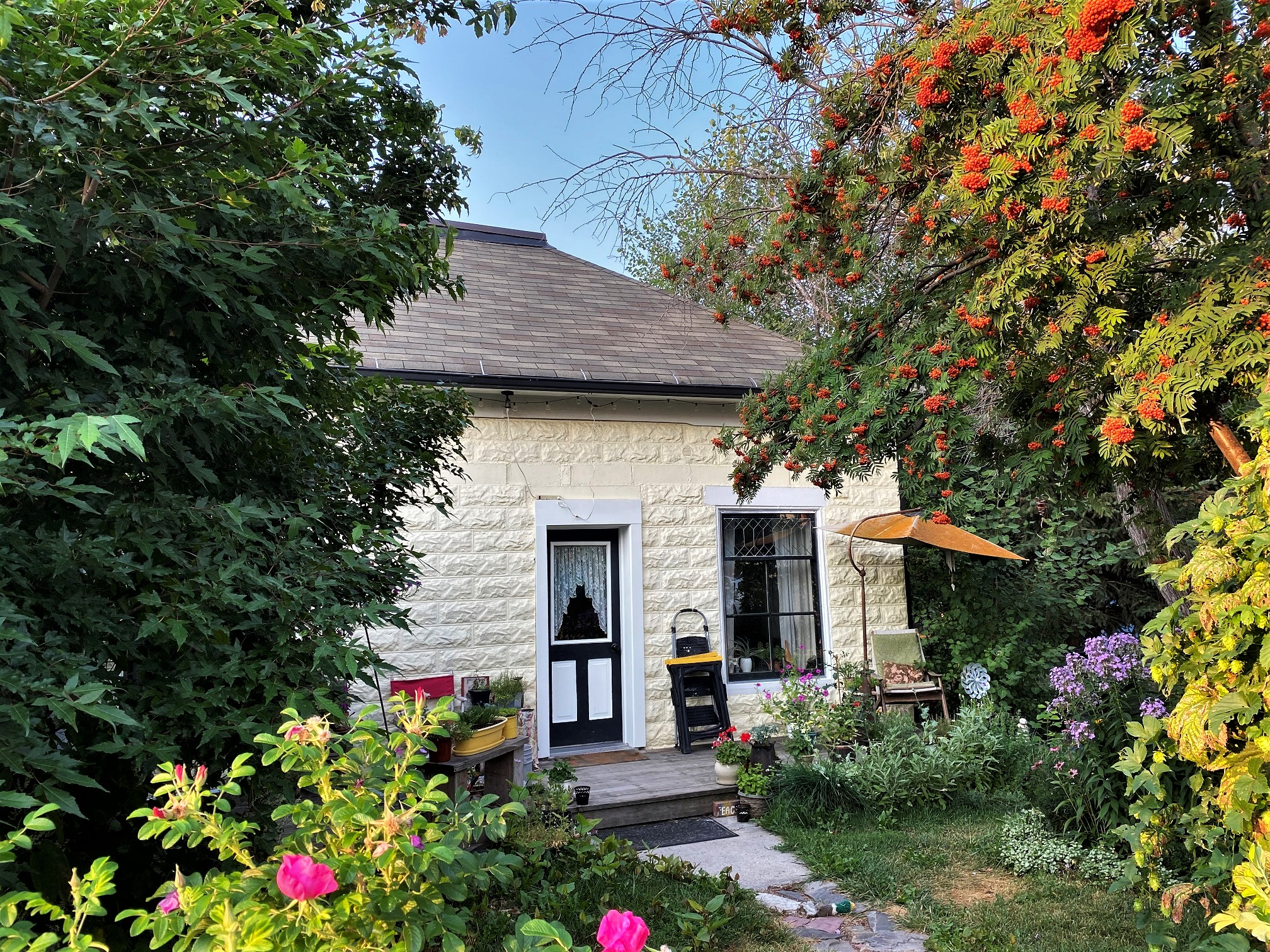
A concrete block cottage with a truncated hip roof, Lancaster House, Stevensville, Montana.

Pyramidal cottages are commonly (not exclusively) wooden frame structures. The roof may come to a pyramidal point, or it may come up to a central chimney. Over a less than truly square house, the roof may peak with a short ridge. Like some larger hip-roofed Victorian houses, some roofs are truncated by a flat cut-off at the top, sometimes crested with decorative millwork.

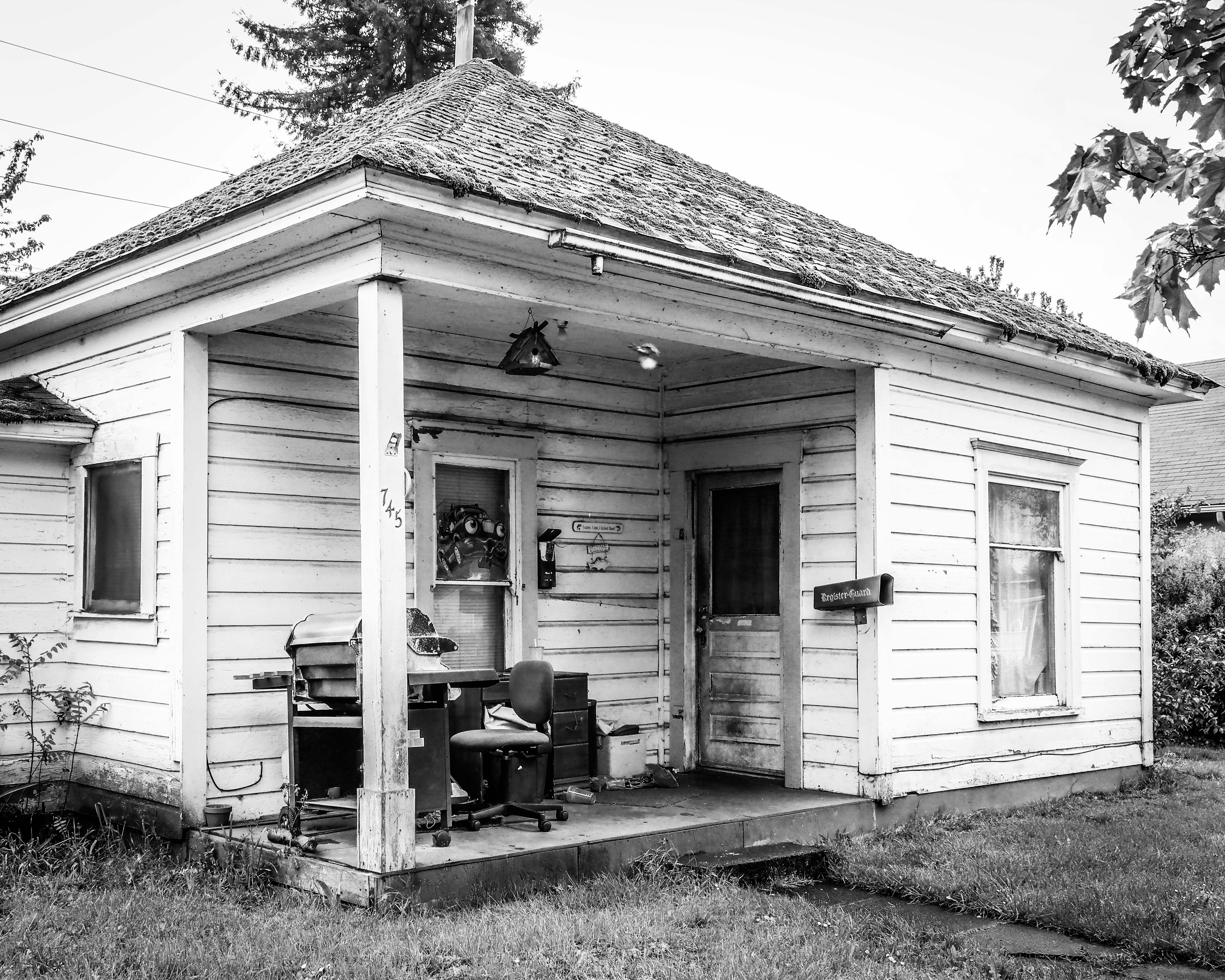
An engaged porch under the main roof, Washburne Historic District, Springfield, Oregon.

Roofed porches, original or added, may be attached to the front and/or back of the square main house. Full width front porches, or nearly full-width, are common. Alternatively, a front porch may be engaged into the square footprint under the main pyramidal roof.

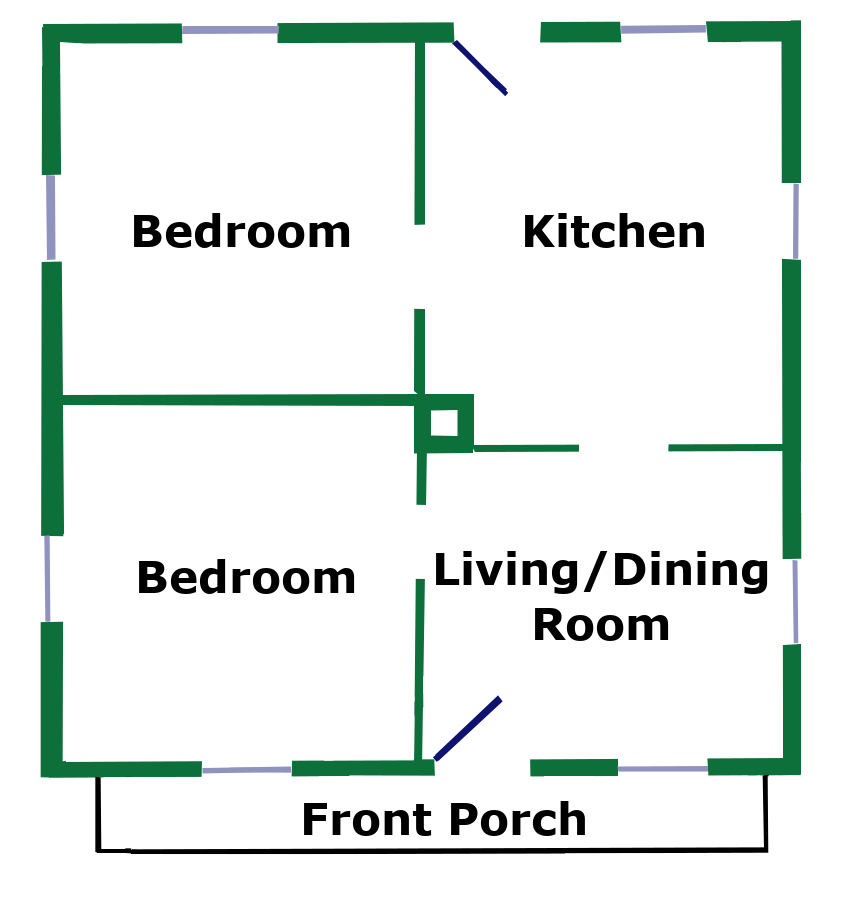
The one-story floorplan typical of an American pyramidal cottage, i.e. the "Four-box Plan" of Thomas Hubka.

The floor plan is typically four large rooms, two rooms wide and two rooms deep; each room may have a window on each outside wall (a "four-box plan"). The rooms are generally connected directly to each other with no connecting hallways. Sometimes a small bathroom is included as a fifth room, but many pyramidal cottages were built before the advent of indoor plumbing. The efficient four-box floor plan resembles that in the two-story American Foursquare.

== History ==
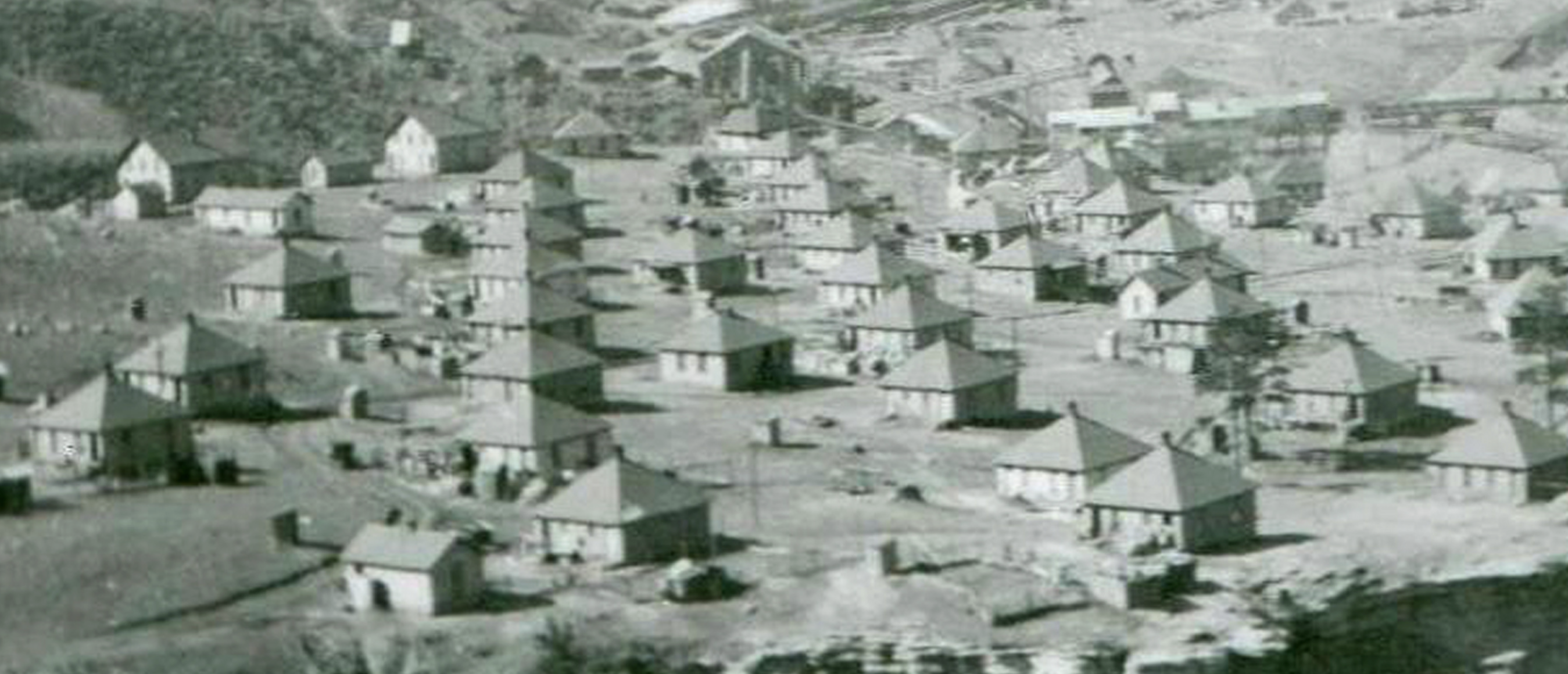
Miner's cottages at the Dawson coal mine in Dawson, New Mexico, 1921.

Pyramidal cottages were economical and efficient housing emerging during the rapid expansion of railroads and industrialization following the American Civil War, mostly but far from exclusively, in the Southern United States.

Pyramidal cottages were sometimes built as worker housing in the company towns associated with mines and mills. For example, in 1899 the Republic Iron and Steel Company added approximately 120 pyramid cottages to worker housing at their newly acquired Thomas, Alabama (now subsumed into Birmingham, Alabama) steel mill.

With their initial small size, their location often in now inner-city neighborhoods, and decades of modification such as extensions and porch enclosures, extant pyramidal cottages are often inconspicuous.

== Gallery ==
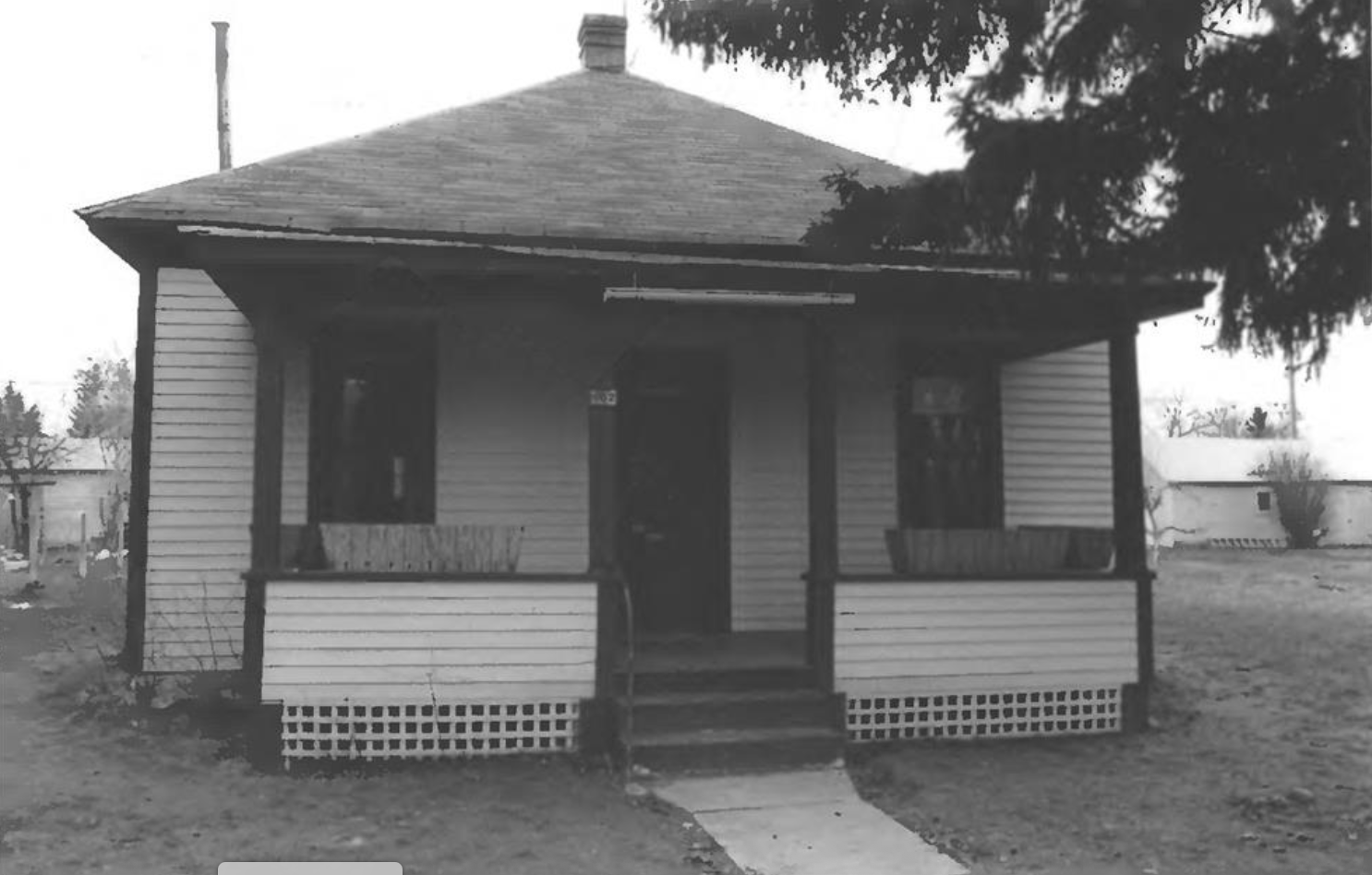
Philip and Ella Morr House in Stevensville, Montana, in 1991.

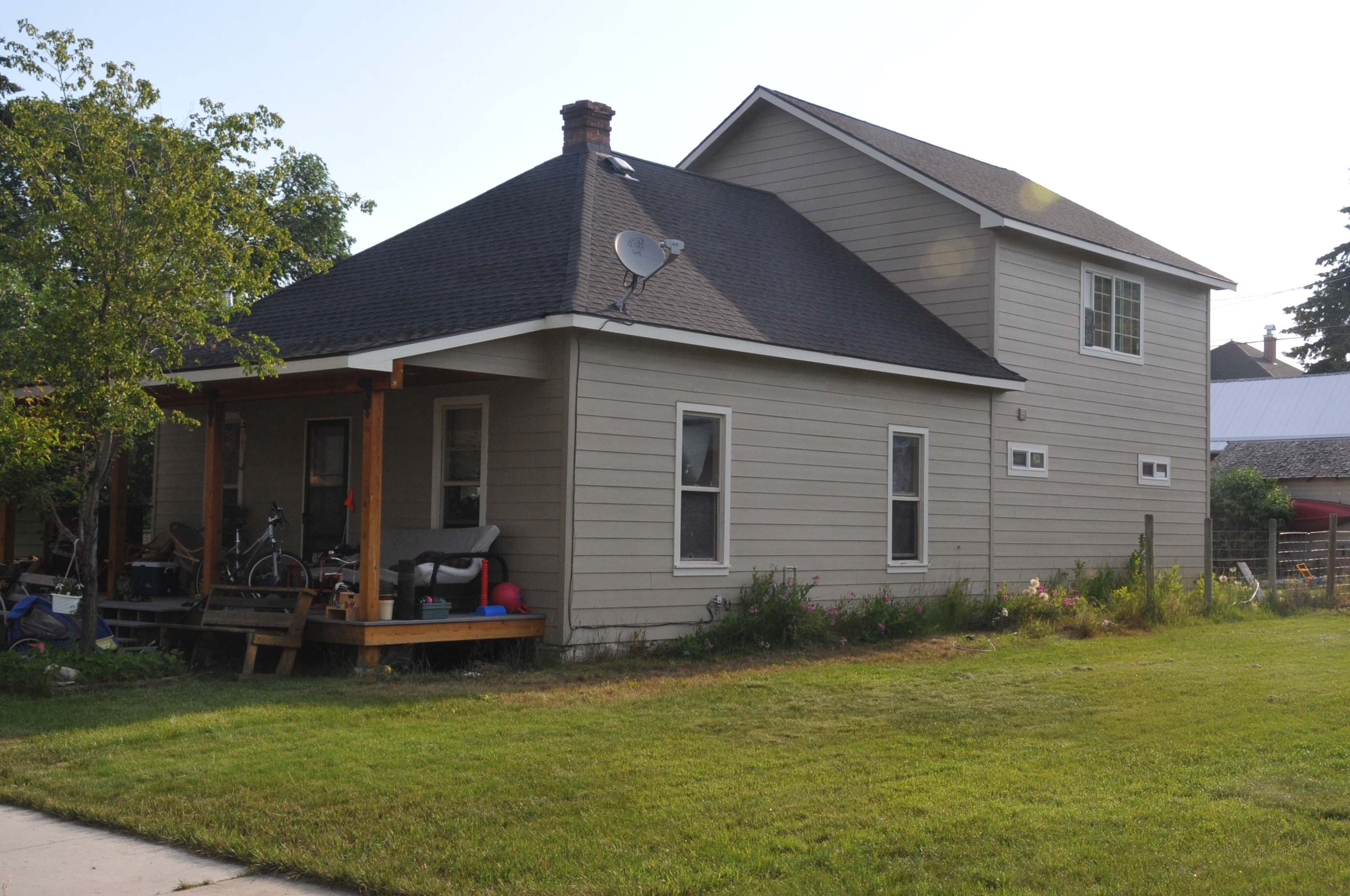
Philip and Ella Morr House, Stevensville, Montana. Cottage with modern addition, 2013. By Jerrye & Roy Klotz, MD.

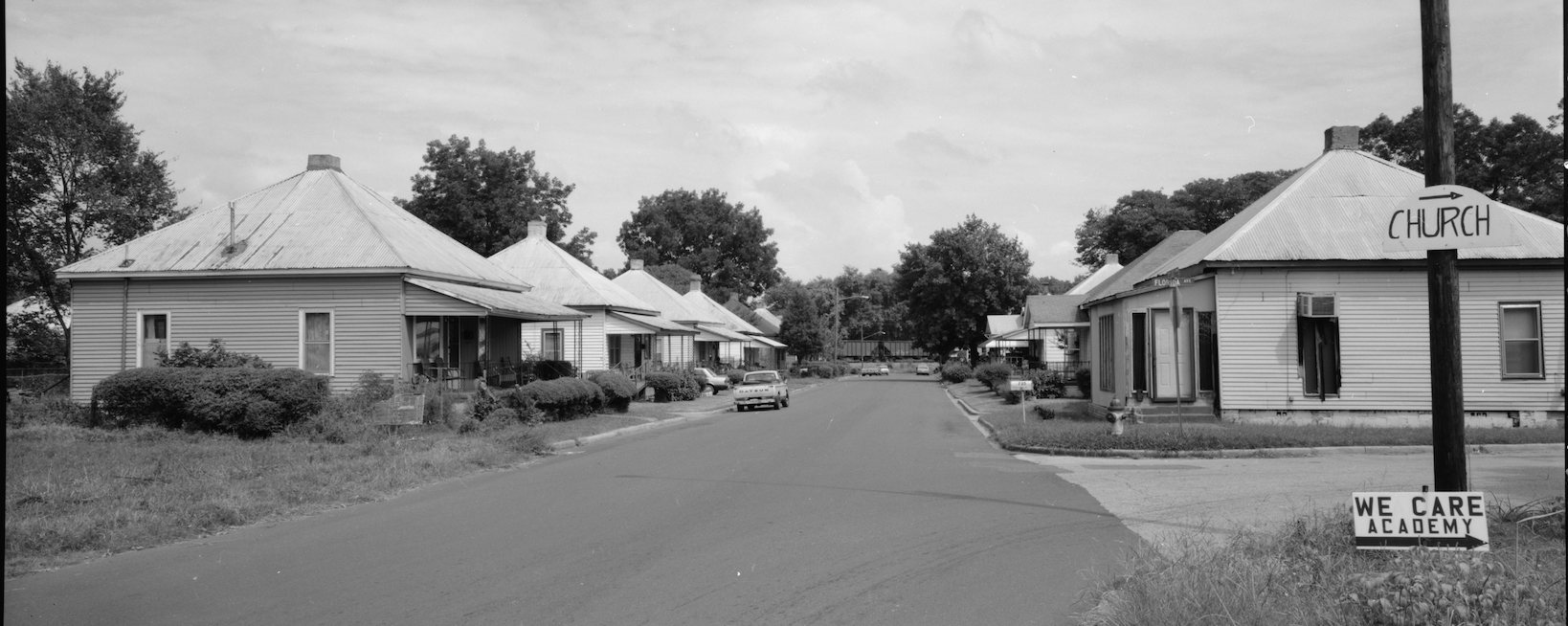
Streetscape, W, 7th St., Thomas Worker Housing, Jefferson County, Alabama

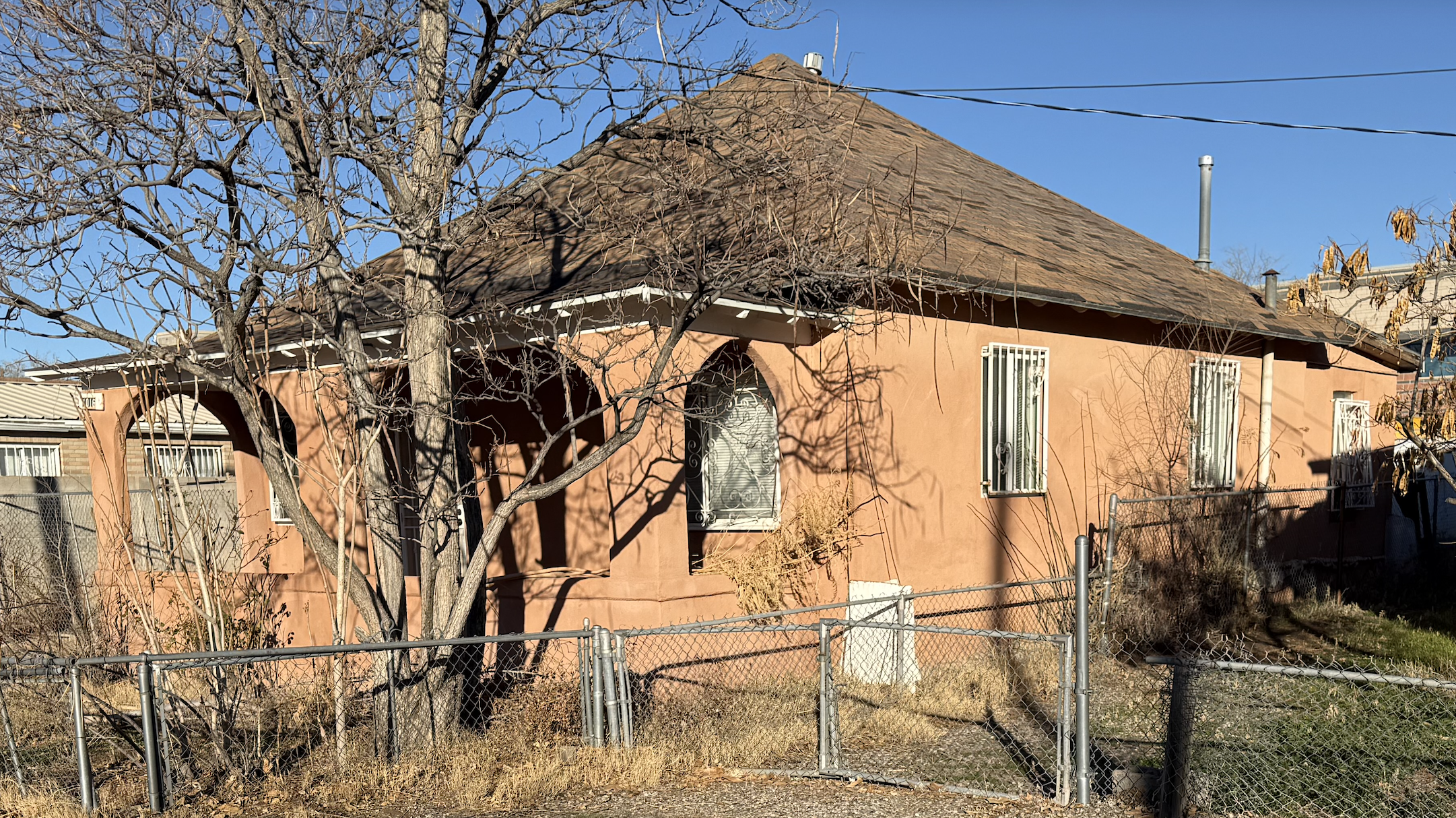
Cement-stuccoed adobe, built between 1913 and 1924, Albuquerque, New Mexico.

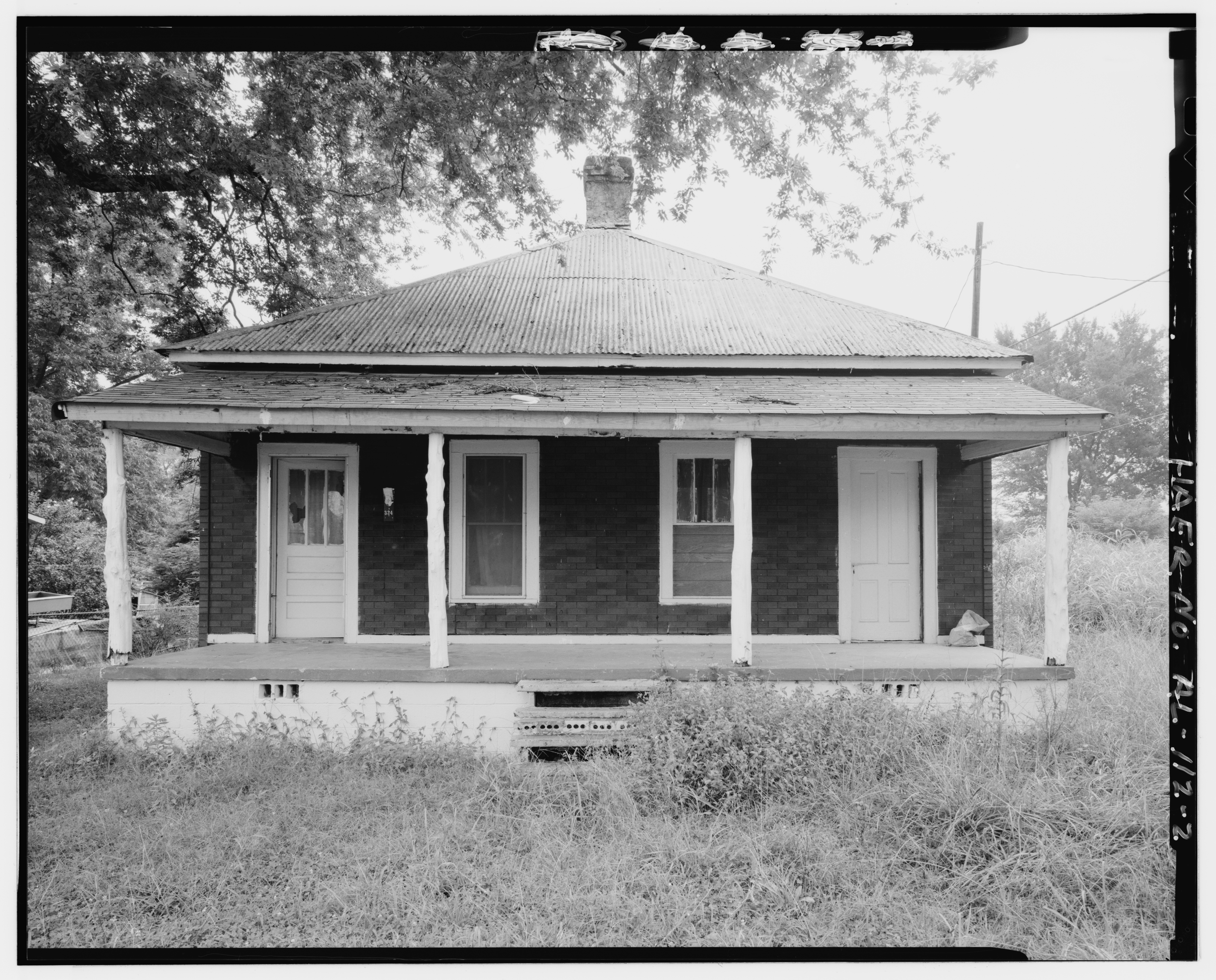
A pyramidal duplex (note two front doors) in Jefferson County, Alabama.

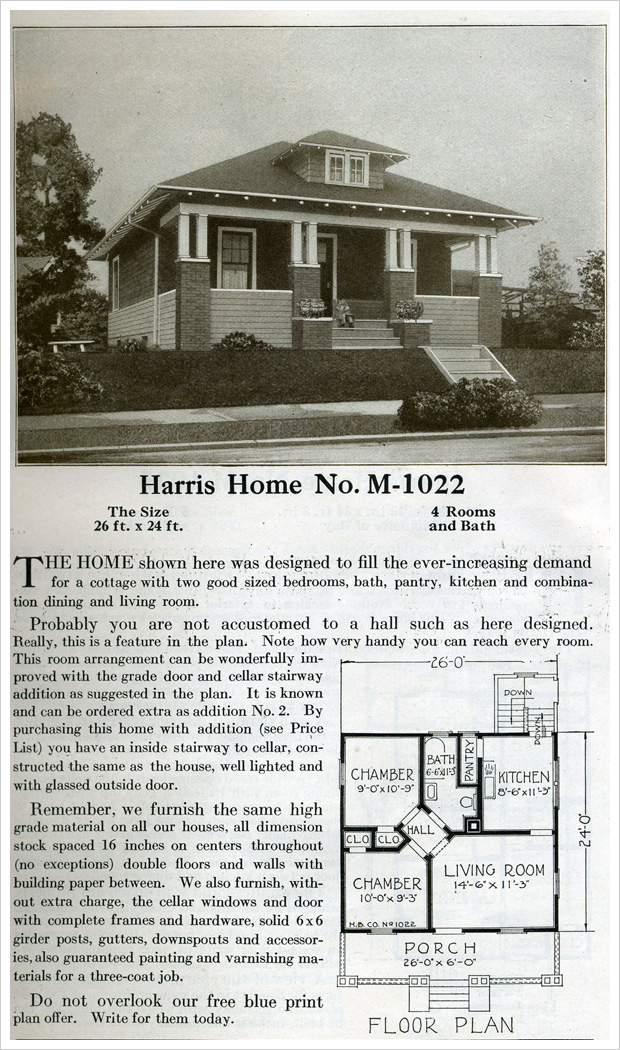
A bungalow-style kit house by Harris Homes in 1920.

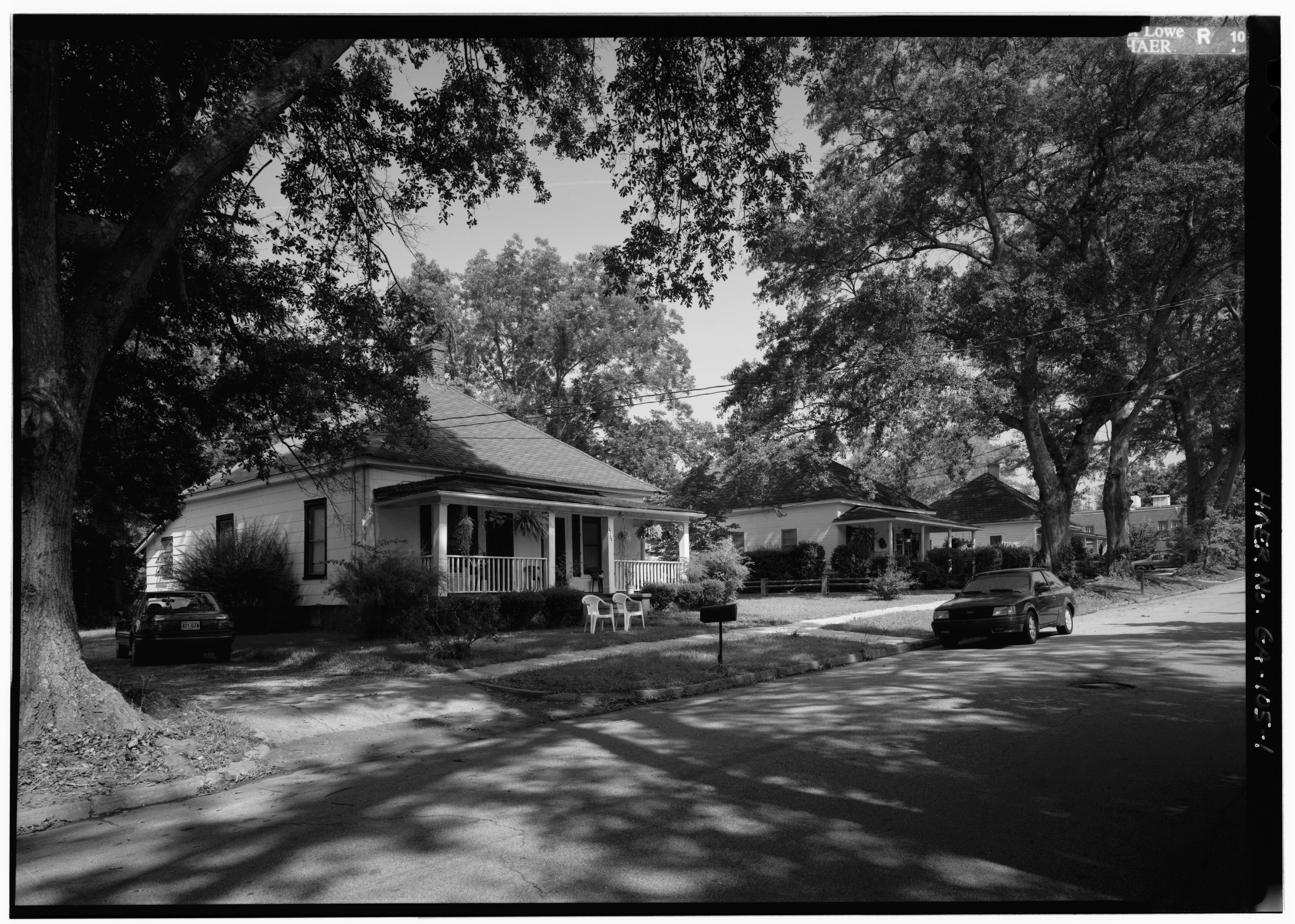
Mill-worker cottage located at 1312 Washington St., LaGrange, Georgia.

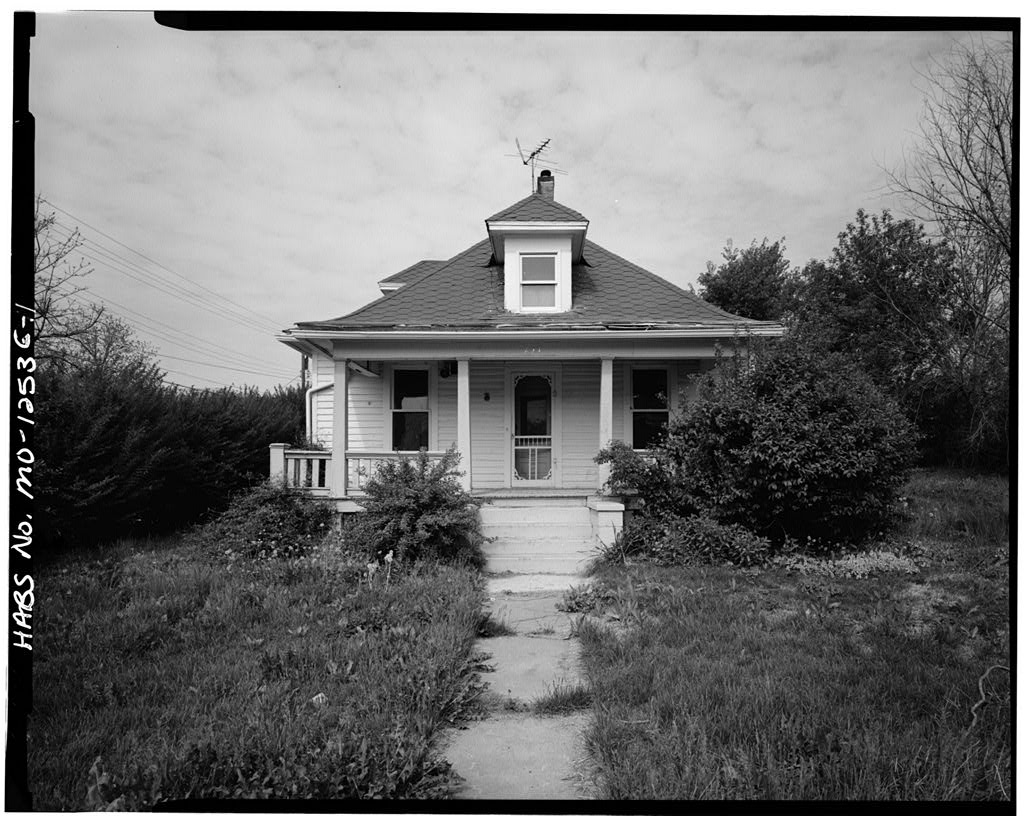
A one-and-a-half story cottage (2 dormers) at 237 McAllister Avenue of downtown Springfield, Missouri, circa 1905. Note flared roof.

Plan and Elevations - 3602 Twenty-fourth Avenue (House), Valley, Alabama

Gable Front House, Shotgun House, and Pyramidal Cottage in Jefferson County, Alabama.
