= Nob Hill, Albuquerque, New Mexico =

Nob Hill
- Neighborhood of Albuquerque
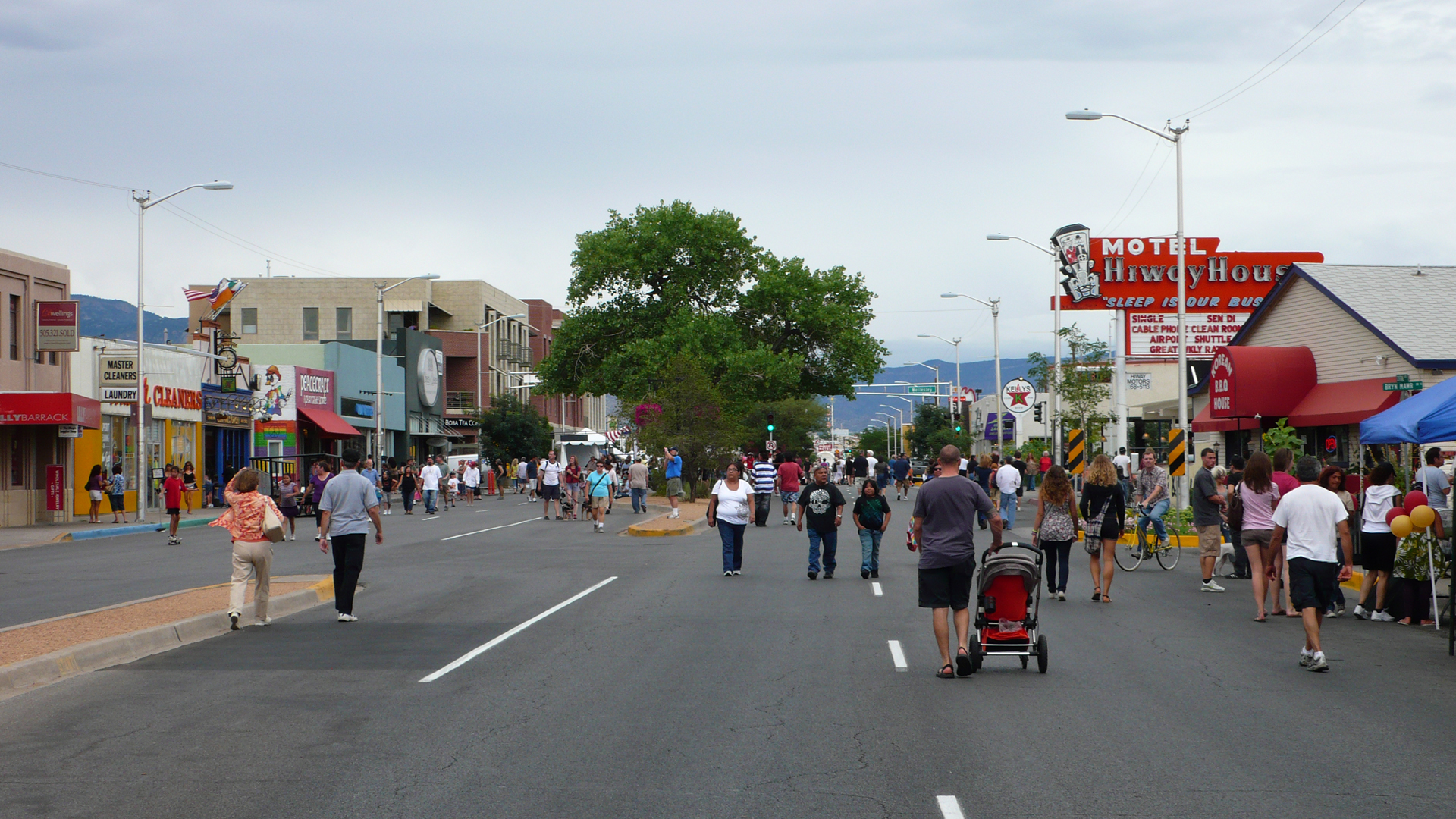
- Street fair in Nob Hill, 2010
- Interactive map of Nob Hill
- Coordinates: 35°4′47″N 106°36′16″W
- Country: United States
- State: New Mexico
- County: Bernalillo
- City: Albuquerque

Government
  - City Council: Rey Garduño
  - State House: Gail Chasey (D); Sheryl Williams Stapleton (D)
  - State Senate: Cisco McSorley (D)
  - U.S. House: Melanie Stansbury (D)

Area
  - Total: 0.96 sq mi (2.5 km^{2})

Population (2010)
  - Total: 4,767
  - Density: 4,952.7/sq mi (1,912.2/km^{2})
- ZIP Code: 87106, 87108, 87110
- Area code: 505

Nob Hill is a neighborhood in Albuquerque, New Mexico, United States, consisting of a commercial district along Central Avenue (former U.S. Route 66) and surrounding residential areas. Located just east of the University of New Mexico, the neighborhood was developed between about 1925 and 1950 and has since become a popular tourist and shopping destination. Known for its eclectic mix of mostly locally owned businesses, Nob Hill has been described as "the heart of Albuquerque's Route 66 culture and also its hippest, funkiest retail and entertainment district". The neighborhood is named after Nob Hill in San Francisco, California.

== Geography ==
According to the Nob Hill Neighborhood Association, the boundaries of Nob Hill are Lomas Boulevard to the north, Washington Street to the east, Garfield Avenue and Zuni Road to the south, and Girard Boulevard to the west. The principal thoroughfares in Nob Hill are Central Avenue and Carlisle Boulevard, which divide the neighborhood roughly into quadrants, and the one-way arterials Lead Avenue and Coal Avenue. The eastern half of the neighborhood is sometimes referred to as "Upper Nob Hill" to distinguish it from the more commercially developed area west of Carlisle.

The Nob Hill neighborhood comprises six individual subdivisions. Clockwise from northwest, these are Monte Vista, College View, Broadmoor, Mesa Grande, Granada Heights, and the eastern half of University Heights. The Monte Vista and College View subdivisions were jointly listed on the National Register of Historic Places in 2001 as the Monte Vista and College View Historic District. In 2022, the Broadmoor Addition and Granada Heights were also listed on the National Register. University Heights was listed in 2025.

== History ==
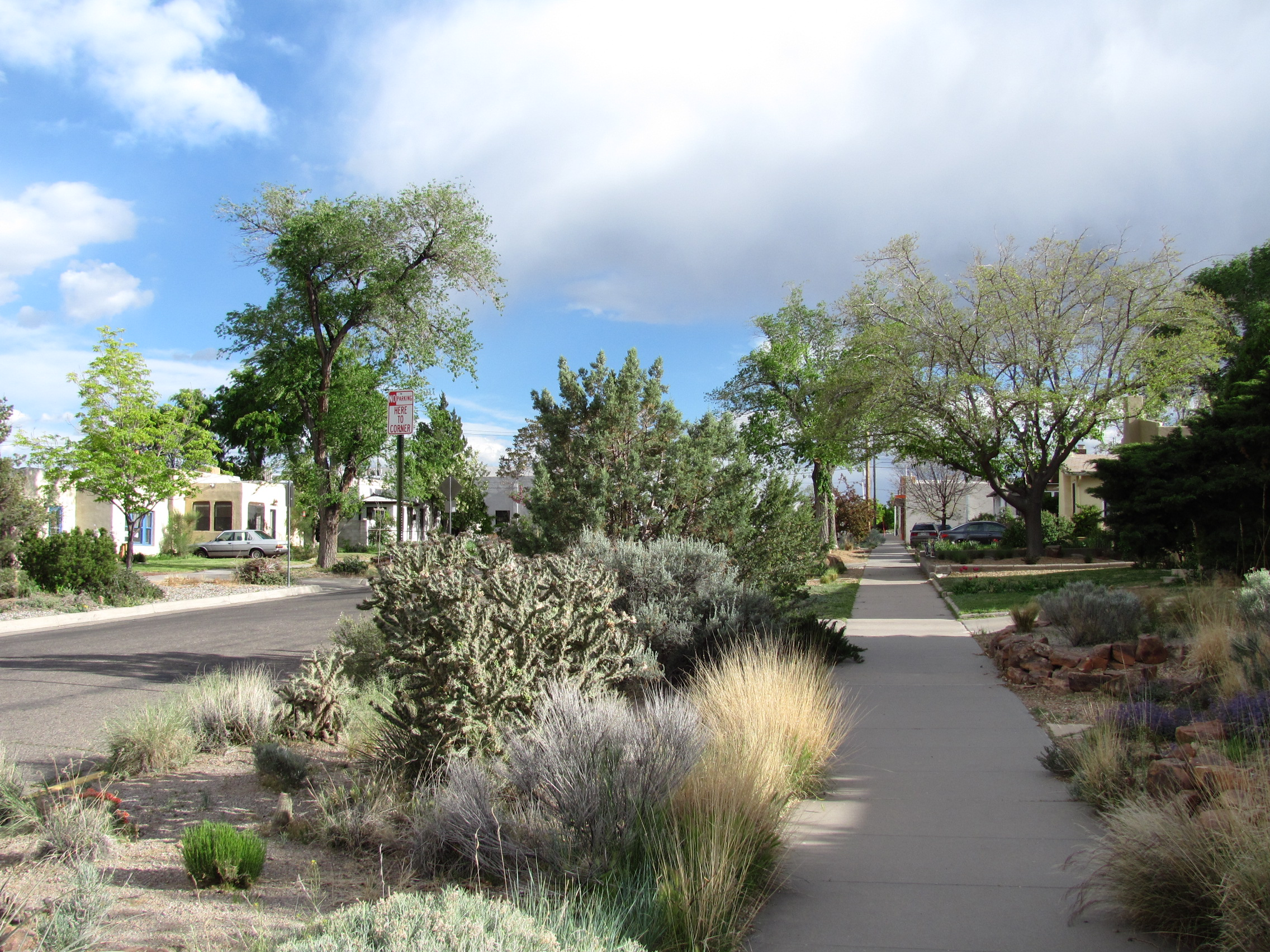
Dartmouth Drive in the Monte Vista Historic District

The area now referred to as Nob Hill was developed beginning in the mid-1920s as Albuquerque began to expand eastward along Central Avenue. The first part of the neighborhood to be laid out was the area south of Central and west of Carlisle, which was platted in 1906 as part of the University Heights Addition and developed beginning in the late 1920s. The developer was D.K.B. Sellers, a prominent local businessman who also served a term as mayor. In 1916 Sellers built a water tank on top of a large hill in eastern University Heights to provide a reliable water supply for the subdivision's residents. Seeking to promote his development, Sellers named the landform Nob Hill after a fashionable area of San Francisco, California. A photograph from 1937 shows Sellers posing with a large "Nob Hill" sign in an empty expanse of desert near what is now Silver and Tulane SE.

On the north side of Central, the Monte Vista Addition was platted in 1926 by William Leverett. Due to topography and drainage concerns, the streets were laid out in an irregular pattern around two intersecting diagonal boulevards, Campus and Monte Vista. Leverett also set aside a large plot for a public elementary school in order to make the development more attractive to potential residents. Opened in 1930 as only the second elementary school on the East Mesa, Monte Vista Elementary School is still operating and has been listed on the National Register of Historic Places. By 1930, over 100 houses had been built in the Monte Vista Addition. The other Nob Hill subdivisions were developed around the same time. Granada Heights was platted in 1925, followed by College View in 1926 and Mesa Grande in 1931.

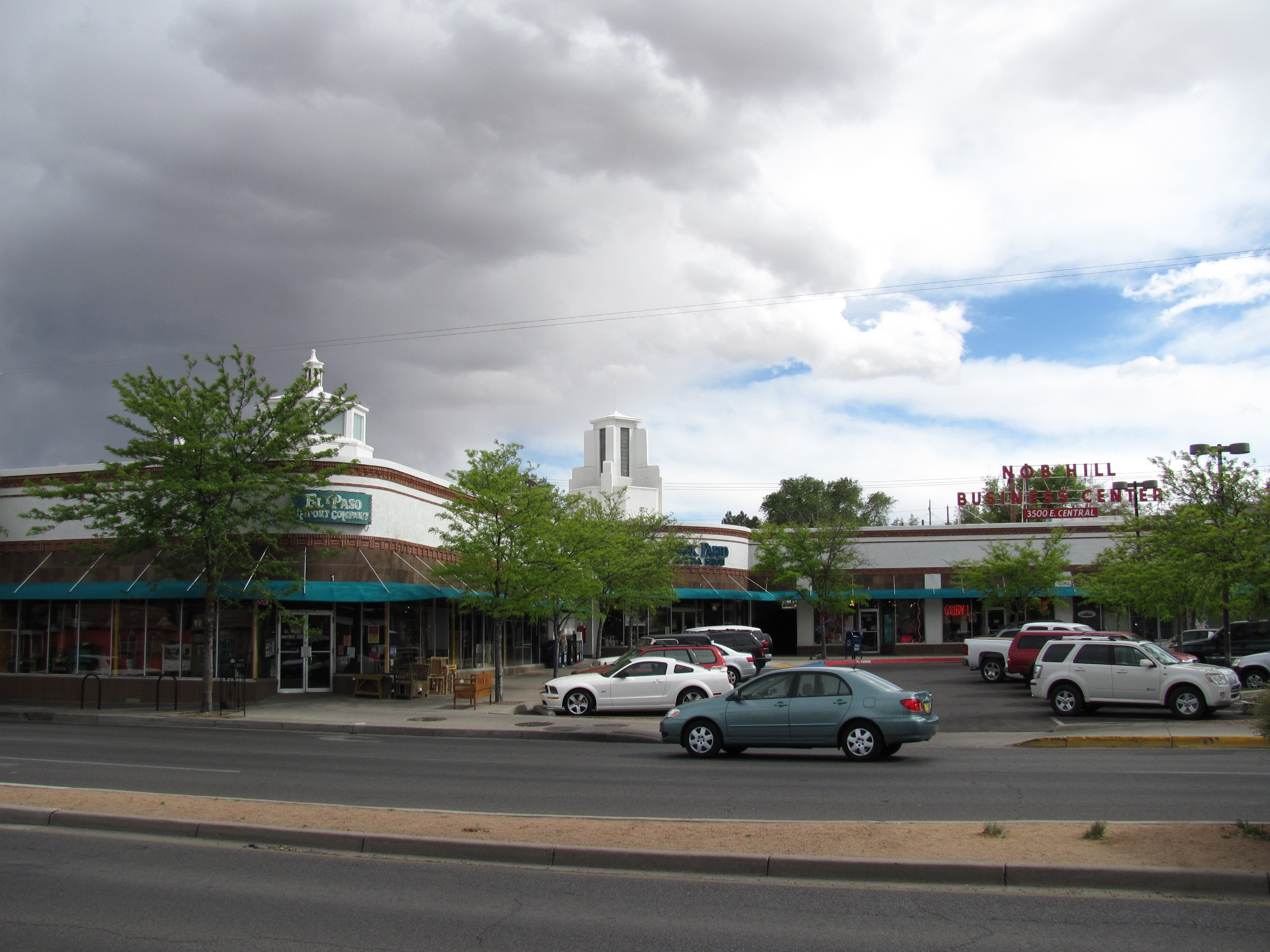
Nob Hill Business Center at Central Avenue and Carlisle Boulevard

Nob Hill's commercial strip began to develop in the 1930s, spurred both by the growth of the surrounding neighborhoods and by the increasing number of travelers on Central Avenue. The latter became increasingly important after 1937, when Central was designated as U.S. Route 66. The presence of both travelers and local residents in the neighborhood resulted in a mix of businesses catering to the two different markets, including the Aztec Motel (1932), El Oriente Court (1935), Modern Auto Court (1937), Lobo Theater (1938), De Anza Motor Lodge (1939), and Jones Motor Company (also 1939). In 1947, a developer named Robert Waggoman built Albuquerque's first modern shopping center, Nob Hill Business Center, at the southwest corner of Central and Carlisle. Critics of the project labeled it "Waggoman's Folly", believing it was too far from the downtown commercial area to attract much business. Further retail development soon turned Nob Hill into one of the city's premier shopping destinations.

After the initial boom, Nob Hill's retail sector entered a decline in the 1960s with the continuing decentralization of the city and the construction of two large shopping malls, Winrock Shopping Center and Coronado Center, in northeast Albuquerque. The tourist business similarly suffered when Interstate 40 was completed, providing travelers a faster and more convenient route through the city that bypassed Central. Nob Hill started to rebound in the 1980s, however, thanks to a growing appreciation of the neighborhood's unique character and Route 66-era history. A number of buildings were added to the National Register of Historic Places in the 1980s and 1990s, and by the mid-1990s the neighborhood's commercial core was thriving and property values were on the rise. In recent years, city planners have focused on expanding redevelopment efforts to the previously blighted Upper Nob Hill and Highland areas.

== Points of interest ==
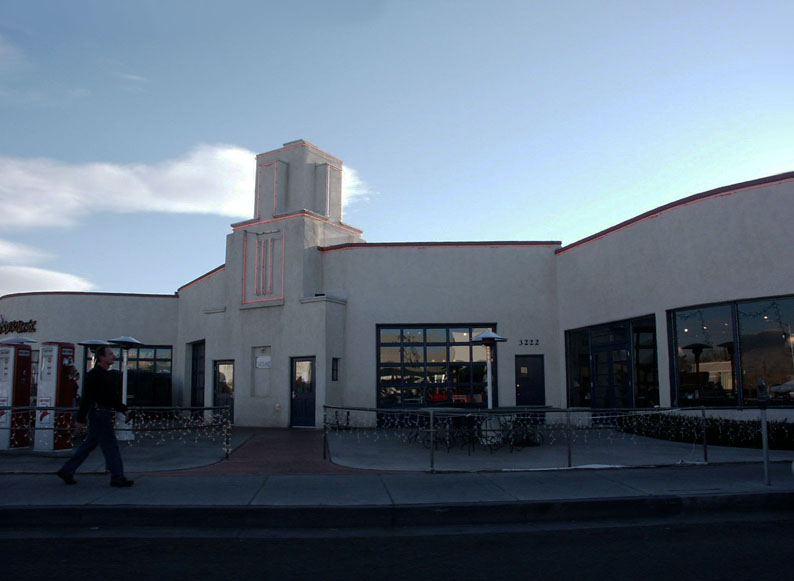
Jones Motor Company, 1939

Nob Hill is home to an eclectic mix of shops, galleries, bars, and restaurants, many of which are locally owned. There are also some chain stores. Until recently, most of the commercial activity in the neighborhood was confined to the area west of Carlisle, but new development has been gradually expanding eastward along Central.

=== National Register of Historic Places ===
Nob Hill includes four historic districts listed on the National Register of Historic Places (NRHP):

- Broadmoor Addition
- Granada Heights
- Monte Vista and College View Historic District
- University Heights

In addition, the neighborhood is or was home to a number of individually listed NRHP properties:

- Aztec Motel (demolished)
- De Anza Motor Lodge (city landmark, mostly demolished)
- Hendren Building
- Immanuel Presbyterian Church
- Jones Motor Company (city landmark)
- William J. Leverett House
- Modern Auto Court
- Monte Vista Elementary School
- Monte Vista Fire Station
- Nob Hill Business Center

== Transportation ==
Local bus service in Nob Hill is provided by ABQ RIDE's 66 Central, 97 Zuni, and 16/18 Broadway-University-Gibson routes. In addition, there is a Rapid Ride station at Central and Carlisle providing express bus service via the 766 Red Line and 777 Green Line.
