= Immanuel Presbyterian Church =

Immanuel Presbyterian Church may refer to:
(sorted by state, then city/town)

- Immanuel Presbyterian Church (Los Angeles, California), a Los Angeles Historic-Cultural Monument
- Immanuel Presbyterian Church (Milwaukee, Wisconsin), listed on the National Register of Historic Places (NRHP)
- Immanuel Presbyterian Church (Albuquerque, New Mexico), NRHP-listed
