= Silver Hill Historic District =

Silver Hill Historic District may refer to:

- Silver Hill Historic District (Weston, Massachusetts), listed on the National Register of Historic Places (NRHP)
- Silver Hill Historic District (Albuquerque, New Mexico), NRHP-listed
