= S. H. Kress Building (Albuquerque, New Mexico) =

- U.S. National Register of Historic Places
- NM State Register of Cultural Properties
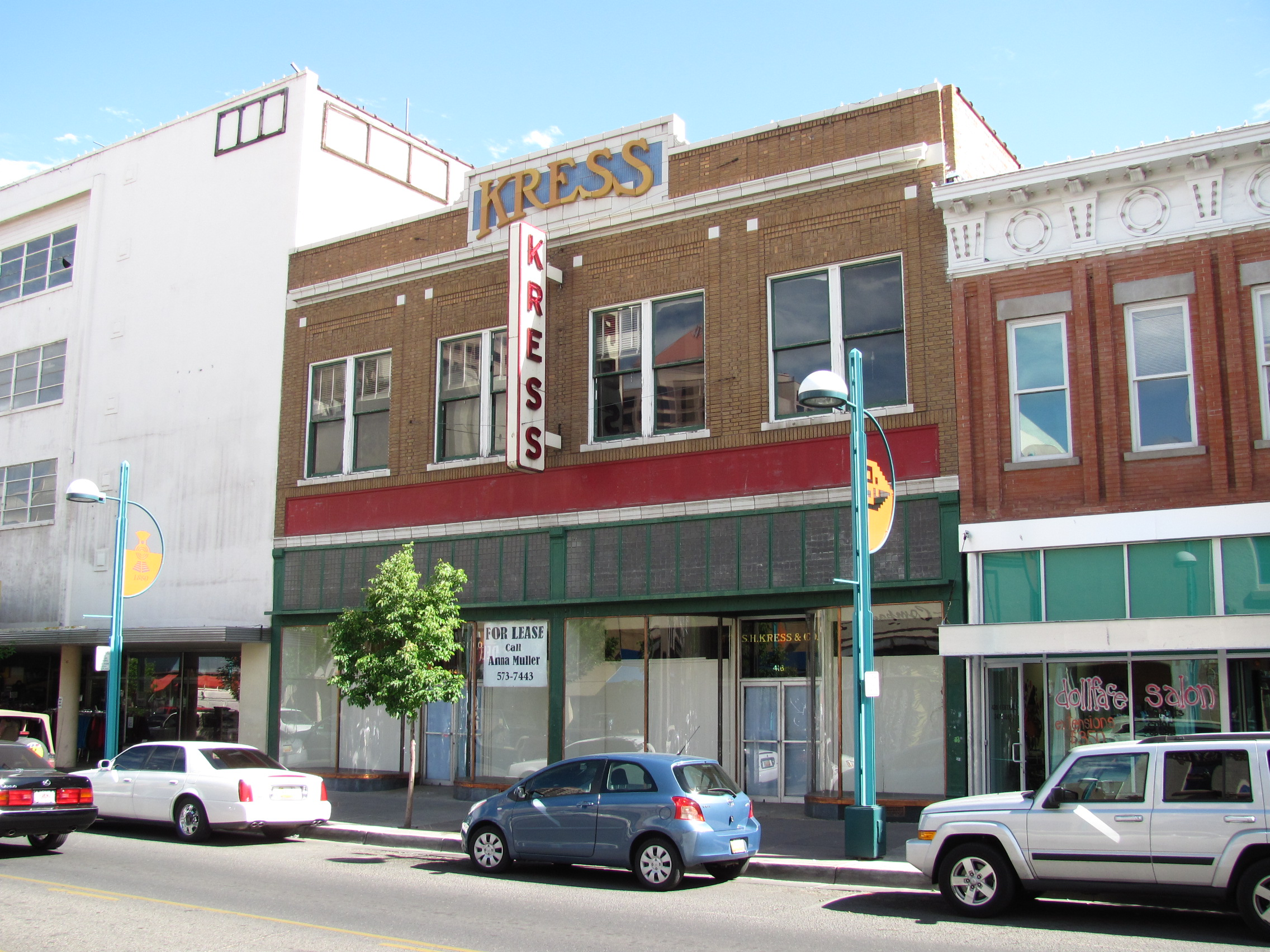
- S. H. Kress Building, May 2010

- Location within New Mexico Location within the United States
- Location: 414–416 Central Ave. SW; Albuquerque, New Mexico
- Coordinates: 35°05′04″N 106°39′07″W
- Built: 1925
- Architect: T.J.T. Hoffman
- NRHP reference No.: 84002871
- NMSRCP No.: 1004

Significant dates
- Added to NRHP: April 19, 1984
- Designated NMSRCP: February 17, 1984

The S. H. Kress Building is a historic commercial building in downtown Albuquerque, New Mexico. Built in 1925 by the S. H. Kress & Co. department store chain, it is notable as a well-preserved early 20th century retail building. It was added to the New Mexico State Register of Cultural Properties and the National Register of Historic Places in 1984.

== History ==
S. H. Kress & Co. purchased land for an Albuquerque store around 1909 but did not build until 1925, when market conditions were judged to be more favorable. The building design was completed in 1924 by architect T. J. T. Hoffman, and construction began in January the following year. The Kress store operated until 1981, when the parent company went out of business. Only minor changes to the building exterior have taken place. Though it’s been vacant for many years, as of 2020 it is currently being renovated by local, Victoria Van Dame. It’s intended to be “a gallery that draws in creatives across all fields – visual, music, performance arts and the culinary arts.”

== Architecture ==
The building is similar to many of the other Kress stores built in smaller cities during the 1910s and 1920s. It is a two-story, flat-roofed building occupying a double lot between the old J. C. Penney store and the McCanna-Hubbell Building. The ground floor storefront is cast iron, with large, plate glass display windows under a prism glass clerestory. The display windows curve inward toward the two recessed entrances, which each have aluminum-framed double doors under a glass transom painted with the name of the company.

The second floor facade is brown brick highlighted by horizontal bands of white stone molding between the first and second floors, near the top of the building, and along the parapet. There are four pairs of wood-framed sash windows set off by decorative brickwork over a flat horizontal panel which was originally a sign. The building is crowned with a white, blue, and gold terra cotta tile "Kress" logo. The interior of the building is mostly original with large, open retail areas on the first and second floors.
