= Silver Hill =

Silver Hill or Silverhill could refer to:

== Canada ==
- Silver Hill, Ontario, a hamlet in Norfolk County
- Silverhill, British Columbia, Canada, a neighbourhood in the District of Mission

== Guyana ==
- Silver Hill, Guyana

== Republic of Ireland ==
- Silver Hill, Donegal, a 600 m peak in County Donegal, Ireland

== United Kingdom and its oversea territories ==
=== England ===
- Silverhill, Hastings, an area of Hastings, East Sussex
- Silverhill, Nottinghamshire, a former colliery and reclaimed spoil heap

=== Northern Ireland ===
- Silverhill, County Fermanagh, a townland in County Fermanagh
- Silverhill, County Tyrone, a townland in County Tyrone

=== Montserrat ===
- Silver Hill, Montserrat - a mountain on the Caribbean island of Montserrat

== United States ==
- Silverhill, Alabama, a small town in Baldwin County, Alabama
- Silver Hill, Arkansas, a town in Searcy County, Arkansas
- Silver Hill Hospital, a private psychiatric hospital in New Canaan, Connecticut
- Silver Hill, Chattooga County, Georgia, an unincorporated community
- Silver Hill, Maryland, a census-designated place in Prince George's County
  - Paul E. Garber Preservation, Restoration, and Storage Facility (nicknamed "Silver Hill"), repair and storage facility of the Smithsonian National Air and Space Museum at Silver Hill, Maryland
- Silver Hill Historic District (Weston, Massachusetts), in the town of Weston, Middlesex County, Massachusetts
- Silver Hill (MBTA station), Weston, Middlesex County, Massachusetts
- Silver Hill, Albuquerque, a neighborhood in Albuquerque, New Mexico
  - Silver Hill Historic District (Albuquerque, New Mexico)
- Silver Hill, North Carolina, an unincorporated community in Davidson County, North Carolina
