= McCanna–Hubbell Building =

- U.S. National Register of Historic Places
- NM State Register of Cultural Properties
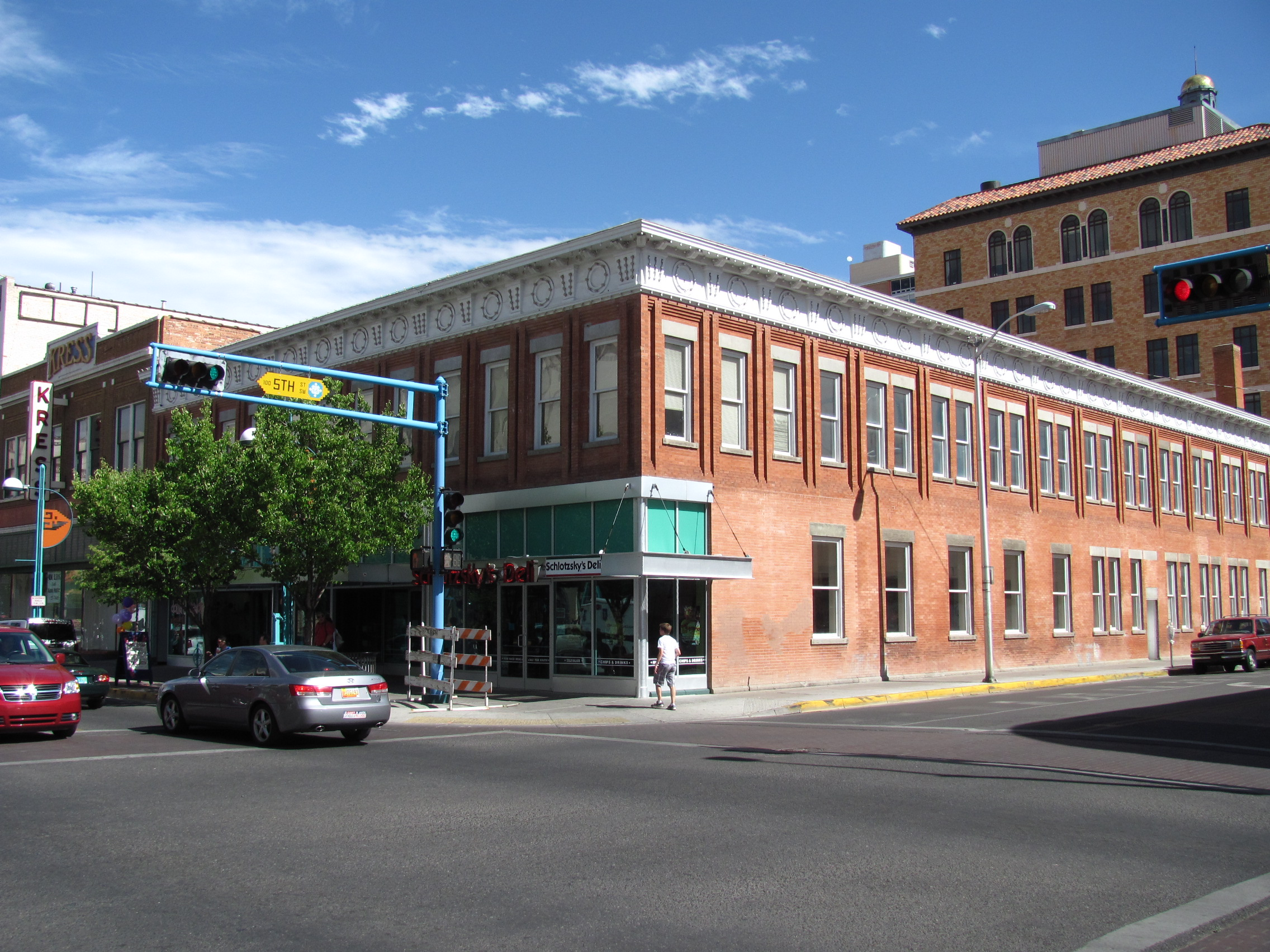
- McCanna–Hubbell Building, May 2010
- Location: 418–424 Central Avenue SW, Albuquerque, New Mexico
- Coordinates: 35°05′04″N 106°39′09.5″W
- Built: 1915
- NRHP reference No.: 82003314
- NMSRCP No.: 829

Significant dates
- Added to NRHP: May 13, 1982
- Designated NMSRCP: June 26, 1981

The McCanna–Hubbell Building, also known as the AG&E Building, is a historic commercial building in downtown Albuquerque, New Mexico. Built in 1915, it is a two-story brick structure with a prominent cornice. From 1917 to the mid-1960s the building was the headquarters of the Albuquerque Gas & Electric Company, which later became the Public Service Company of New Mexico (PNM). During this period the piers and cornice of the building were decorated with hundreds of electric light bulbs, the sockets for which are still in place. PNM later moved two blocks south to the PNM Building on Silver Avenue.

The property was added to the New Mexico State Register of Cultural Properties in 1981 and the National Register of Historic Places in 1982. It is located on the southeast corner of 5th Street and Central Avenue, adjacent to the S. H. Kress Building and directly across the street from the KiMo Theater.
