= Kelvinator House =

House in Albuquerque, New Mexico

- U.S. Historic district – Contributing property
- NM State Register of Cultural Properties
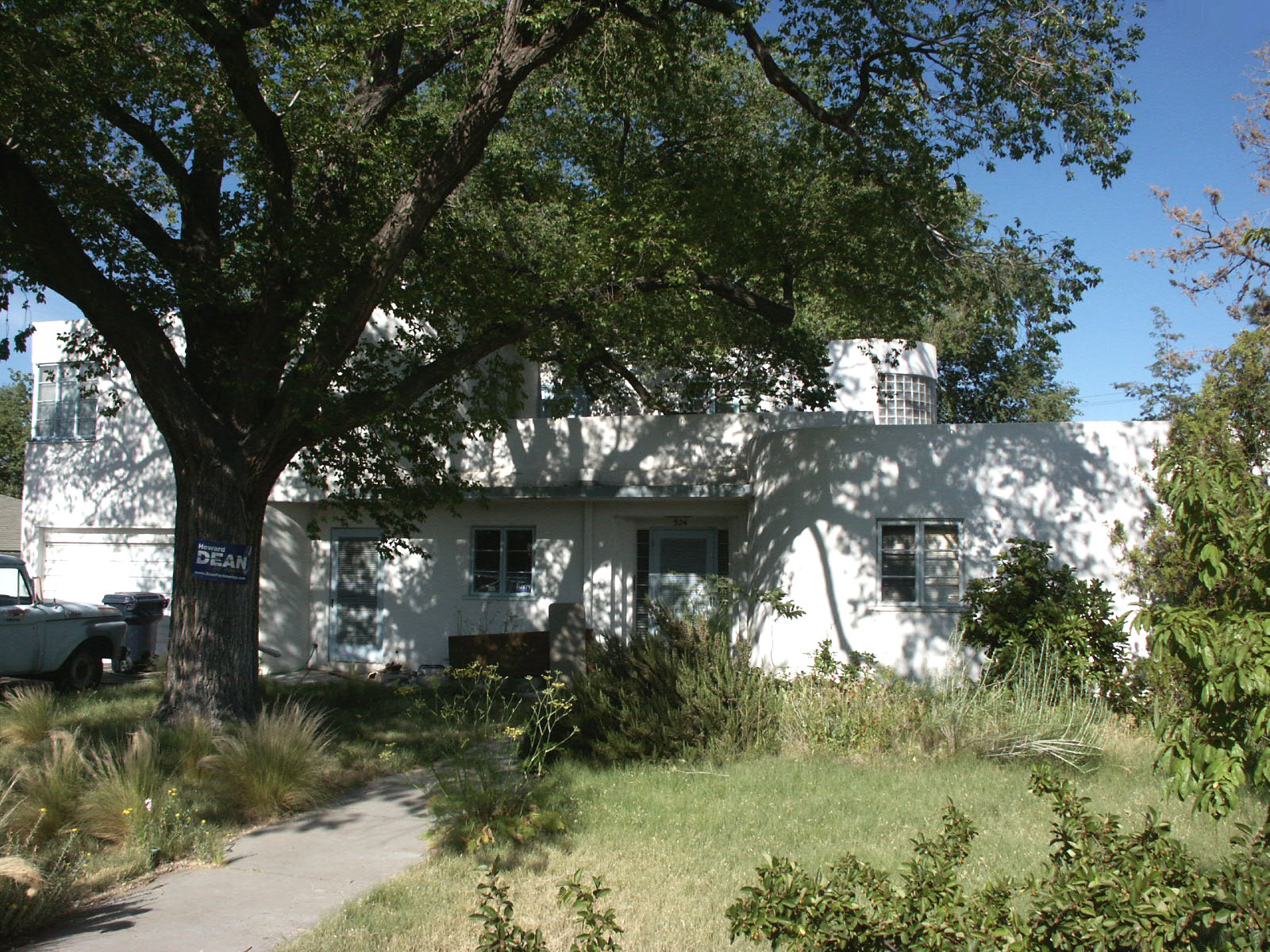
- The house in 2004

- Location within New Mexico
- Location: 324 Hermosa Dr. SE, Albuquerque, New Mexico
- Coordinates: 35°04′33″N 106°36′11″W
- Built: 1938
- Architect: William E. Burk Jr.
- Architectural style: International
- Part of: Granada Heights (ID100007700)
- NMSRCP No.: 704

Significant dates
- Designated CP: July 5, 2022
- Designated NMSRCP: October 20, 1978

The Kelvinator House, also known as the Raabe House, is a historic house in Albuquerque, New Mexico. It was built in 1938 by Walter C. Raabe, the owner of Raabe & Mauger Hardware Company, as a showcase for the Kelvinator appliances the company distributed. It was one of over 200 "Kelvin Homes" built around the country starting in 1936. The house was designed by William E. Burk Jr., and was one of the city's earliest International Style homes along with the Lembke House. In 1976, a stylistically consistent second-story studio space was added to the building. It was added to the New Mexico State Register of Cultural Properties in 1978. In 2022, it was listed as a contributing property in the Granada Heights historic district.

== History ==
The first Kelvin Home was built in 1936 in Livonia, Michigan and by 1938 there were reportedly over 200 of them around the country. Each home was equipped with a complete Kelvinator climate control system and electric appliances, and was intended to be affordable to the average consumer. According to the company's promotional materials, "The Kelvin Home, the result of years of scientific research on the part of Kelvinator corporation, applies the latest findings in the fields of air-conditioning, refrigeration, heating and architectural design to the needs and desires of the home owners of America. Designed for the moderate income group family, the Kelvin Home plans and specifications will be offered by Kelvinator corporation to the architects and builders of the country as a basis for the construction of truly modern homes."

In Albuquerque, Walter C. Raabe built his own Kelvin Home in 1937–38 in the Granada Heights subdivision, which was then at the edge of the city. Raabe was the owner of the Raabe-Mauger Hardware Company, a local distributor of Kelvinator products. An advertisement for the building's grand opening in February, 1938, read:

Yes—it has actually been built right here in our own community—the Kelvin Home you've been reading about—and hearing about—everywhere. And here's why you'll want to see it: It's a beautiful home—it's a well built home, it's a perfectly designed home. It's a home where all the drudgery is eliminated—where tasks are done electrically. It's a home that is completely air conditioned—summer and winter. And yet—you can "operate" this home at no greater cost than that of running an ordinary six room house!

It was reported to be the first house in Albuquerque to be equipped with air conditioning, and was called "ultra-modern in every respect" and the "home of tomorrow". It featured centrally controlled air conditioning, heating, and humidity control, as well as the newest Kelvinator refrigerator and electric range. The design by local architect William E. Burk Jr., featured the latest International Style architecture, which stood out among the mostly Pueblo Style houses in the area. In 1972, the house was purchased by Edna Heatherington, then an architecture student, who studied the building's design principles and constructed a second-story addition consistent with the original architecture. The addition was completed in 1976 and became the basis for Heatherington's master's thesis.

== Architecture ==
The Kelvinator House adheres to the principles of the International Style: an emphasis on functional, rational spaces, and a rejection of symmetry and ornament. According to architect Edna Heatherington, "Kelvinator House has an interesting place in the brief history of 'modern' architecture in Albuquerque, not only because of its aesthetic distinction but also because of its theoretical purity." The house is of frame construction and is two stories high, with a flat roof. The first floor is organized around a large living room which includes a semi-cylindrical wall of windows overlooking the back yard, with two bedrooms on one side and a garage, kitchen, and small dining area on the other side. The second floor originally consisted of only a single recreation room and an outdoor terrace area, but was expanded to include an additional bedroom or studio space in 1976. Like other International Style homes, the Kelvinator House makes extensive use of steel casement windows and glass brick.
