= Monte Vista Fire Station =

- U.S. National Register of Historic Places
- NM State Register of Cultural Properties
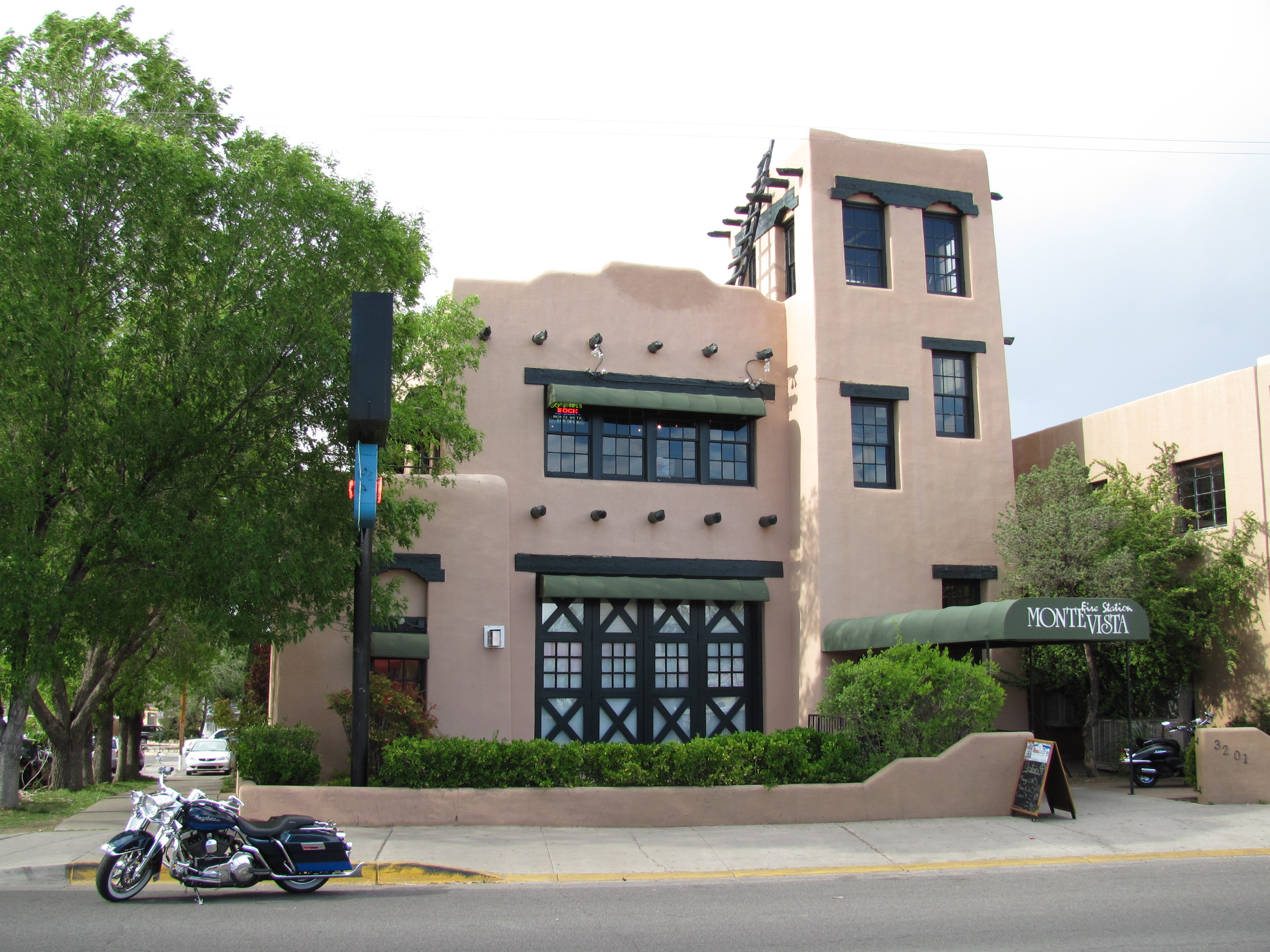
- Monte Vista Fire Station, May 2010

- Location within New Mexico Location within the United States
- Location: 3201 Central Ave. NE Albuquerque, New Mexico
- Coordinates: 35°04′51″N 106°36′31″W
- Built: 1936
- Architect: E. H. Blumenthal
- Architectural style: Pueblo Revival
- NRHP reference No.: 87001121
- NMSRCP No.: 849

Significant dates
- Added to NRHP: March 19, 1987
- Designated NMSRCP: December 18, 1981

Monte Vista Fire Station is a historic former fire station in the Nob Hill neighborhood of Albuquerque, New Mexico. Built in 1936 using Works Progress Administration funding, it is notable as a well-preserved WPA municipal project and for its significance in the early development of the Nob Hill area. The building served in its original role as a fire station until 1972 and currently houses a restaurant. It is the city's third oldest surviving fire station after the AT&SF Fire Station, built in 1920, and the old station #2 on the corner of High St. and Silver Ave. opened in 1926.

The fire station is listed in the New Mexico State Register of Cultural Properties and the National Register of Historic Places.

It was designed by Albuquerque's City Architect, Ernst H. Blumenthal, who also designed the Old Albuquerque Municipal Airport Building (1939), which is also NRHP-listed.

== History ==
In the 1930s, Albuquerque was undergoing rapid development along Central Avenue on the high ground east of Downtown, an area then known as the East Mesa. As the city worked to extend municipal services to the new residents, it was able to take advantage of federal funding from New Deal programs for many of its projects. This included a Works Progress Administration grant of $14,300 to build a new fire station. The building was designed by city architect E. H. Blumenthal and was completed in November 1936 after just five months of construction. The total cost of the project was about $24,000.

The building served the city as Albuquerque Fire Department Station No. 3 for over thirty years. The station originally housed one pumper truck with a crew of five, but was expanded in 1952 to accommodate a longer ladder truck and a crew of ten. However, by the 1970s the station's doors were too small for the newest fire engines and its location on traffic-heavy Central Avenue was inconvenient. The city built a new Station No. 3 about four blocks away on Girard Boulevard in 1972 and the old station was sold.

During the 1970s and 80s, the building housed a variety of tenants including an art gallery, a church, and a film production studio. In 1985 it was converted to a restaurant and bar called Monte Vista Fire Station. Monte Vista Fire Station closed and was re-opened as The Smoky Note in 2024. The fire station was added to the New Mexico State Register of Cultural Properties in 1981 and the National Register of Historic Places in 1987.

== Architecture ==
Designed by E. H. Blumenthal, the Monte Vista Fire Station is a two-story Pueblo Revival building with a three-story corner tower. The building is constructed from structural clay tile and stuccoed to resemble New Mexico's traditional adobe buildings with stepped parapets, projecting vigas, and ladders. The tower has staggered windows following the stairs inside and contains a three-story central shaft for drying fire hoses. The building retains its original 14-foot (4.3 m) garage doors and wood-framed 6/6 sash windows. A matching addition at the rear of the building was added in 1952 to accommodate larger trucks.
