= Castle Apartments =

Historic building in Albuquerque, New Mexico, US

- U.S. National Register of Historic Places
- NM State Register of Cultural Properties
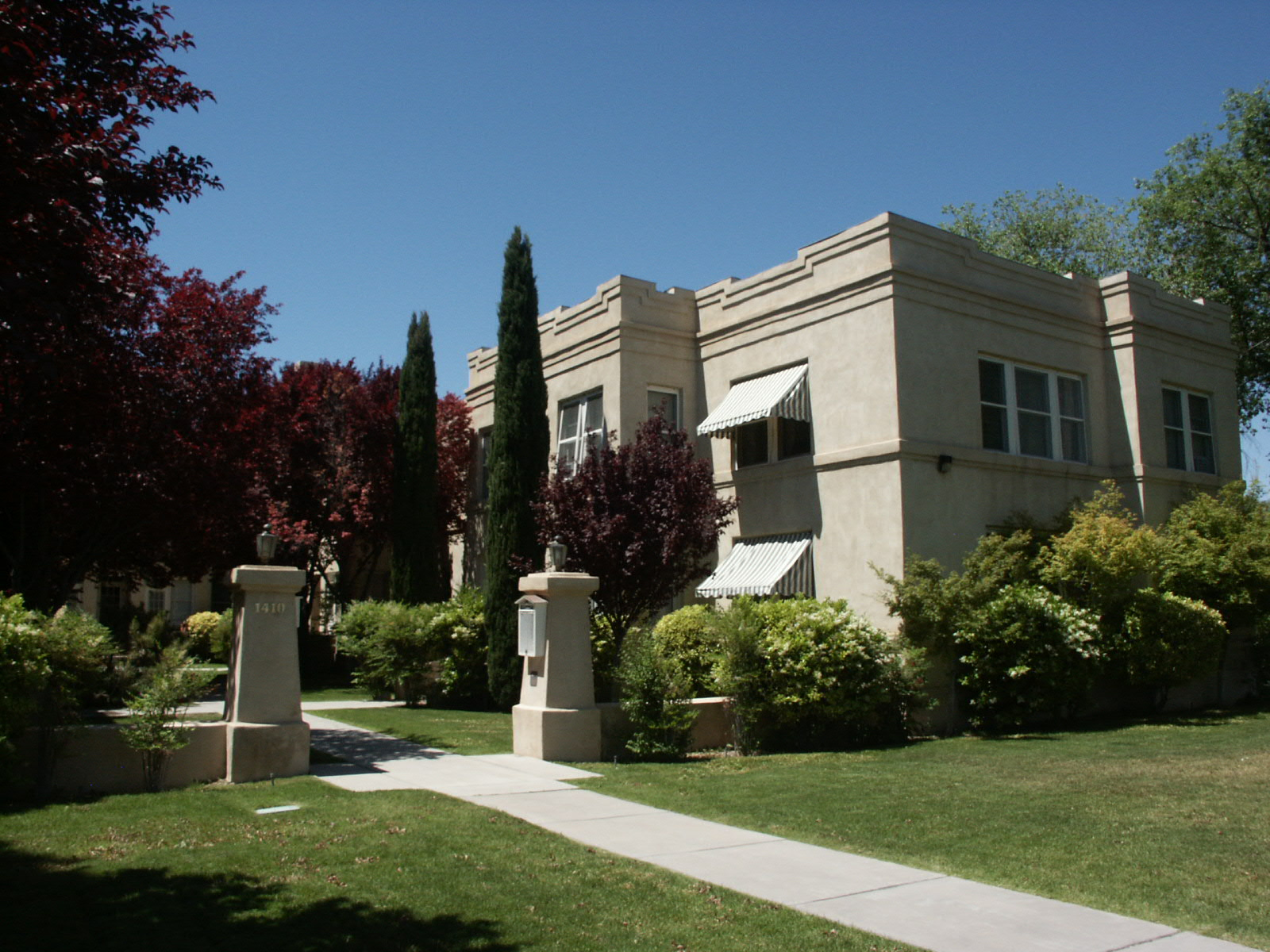
- The Castle Apartments in 2004

- Location within New Mexico Location within the United States
- Location: 1410 Central Ave. SW, Albuquerque, New Mexico
- Coordinates: 35°5′20″N 106°39′49″W
- Built: 1922
- Architect: Trost & Trost, George P. Hill
- Demolished: 2010
- NRHP reference No.: 86000219
- NMSRCP No.: 1213

Significant dates
- Added to NRHP: February 13, 1986
- Designated NMSRCP: November 22, 1985

Castle Apartments was a historic apartment building in Albuquerque, New Mexico, United States, which was destroyed by fire in 2009. It was located on the southeast corner of 15th Street and Central Avenue, roughly halfway between Downtown and Old Town, and took its name from the Huning Castle mansion, which originally stood on the other side of 15th Street.

Built in 1922, it was a two-story, U-shaped building with a central courtyard and 20 residential units ranging in size from 600 to 750 square feet. The architects were Trost & Trost of El Paso, with George P. Hill. The Castle Apartments were added to the New Mexico State Register of Cultural Properties in 1985 and the National Register of Historic Places in 1986.

== History ==
The apartments were built in 1922 by Arno Huning, the son of well known local businessman Franz Huning. At the time, the city was growing rapidly and there was an increasing demand for new apartment housing. Huning built the apartments on a piece of his late father's estate near the Huning Castle mansion, for which the building was named. The apartments cost approximately $75,000, a significant amount for the time. Contemporary advertisements reported that the apartments would "help to fill a long felt need in this city in providing homes for those of the most exacting requirements. The architect, while not restricted as to cost, has not permitted fancy to wander at random but has kept his product within the bounds of refined elegance." Due to the building's high quality of construction, it remained a fashionable address through much of its history.

== Architecture ==
The Castle Apartments were designed by the El Paso firm of Trost & Trost with George P. Hill. It was a U-shaped, two-story building with a central courtyard opening onto Central Avenue. The front elevation was symmetrical, with two projecting entrance bays on each of the side wings and one in the center, all topped with triangular pediments. Other ornamentation was restrained, consisting of simple string course and cornice moldings and a subtly crenellated parapet. The exterior walls were finished with cream-colored stucco and contained over 100 original wood-framed sash windows.

The apartments consisted of 20 one- and two-bedroom units ranging in size from 600 to 750 square feet (56–70 m^{2}). Each unit had 9-foot (2.7 m) ceilings, hardwood floors, and central steam heating provided by a boiler in the southwest corner of the building. The second-floor units were accessed by interior staircases, while the first-floor units could be entered directly from the courtyard as well as from the interior landings. At the time of the building's destruction, the interior trim and hardware was largely original. Also on the property was an original 10-unit garage building.

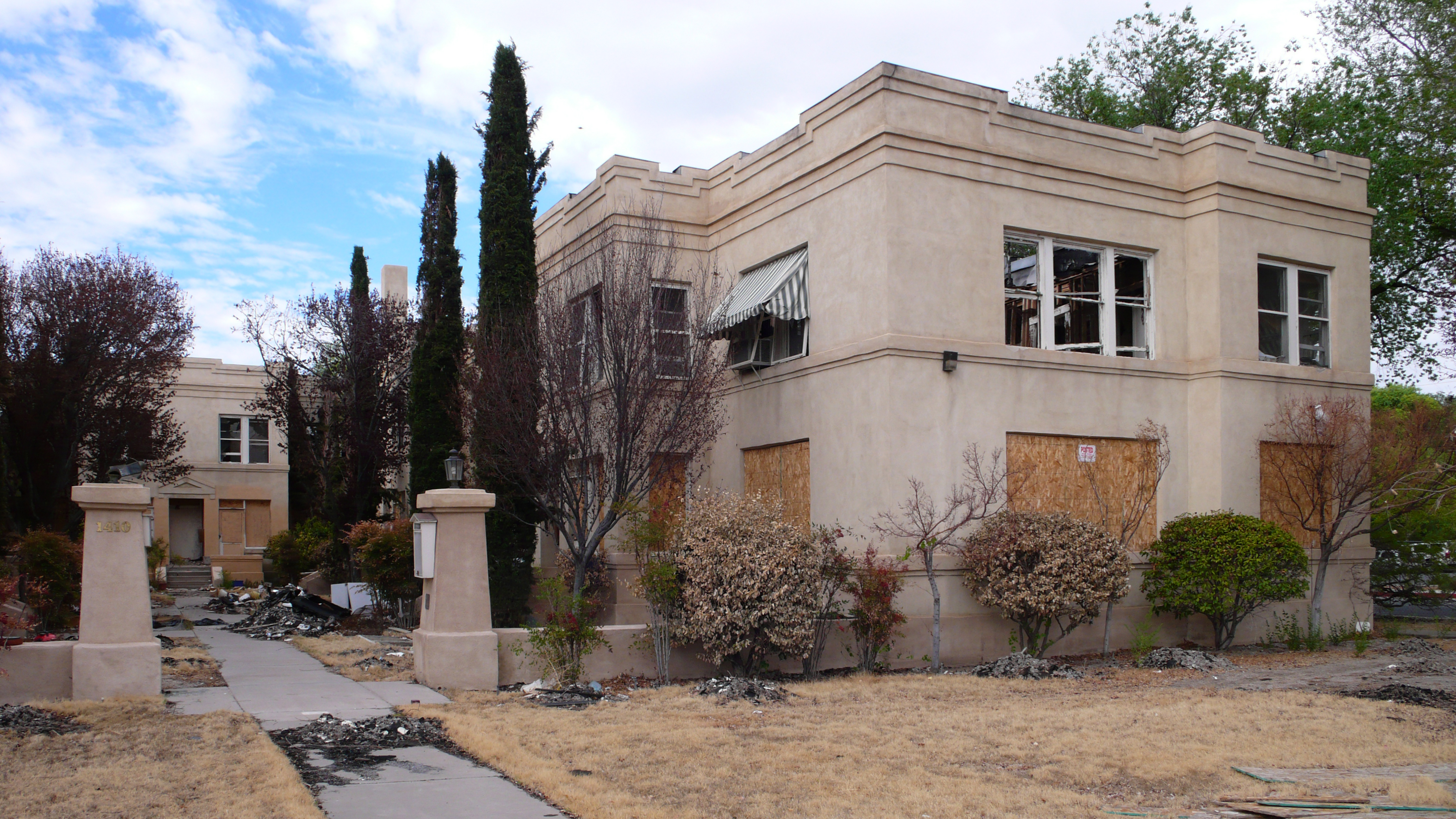
The fire-damaged building in 2010, shortly before its demolition

== Fire and aftermath ==
The Castle Apartments fire began around 8 pm on August 4, 2009, and quickly spread throughout the entire building via the shared attic space. Thirteen fire trucks and around 50 firefighters responded to the scene, fighting the blaze for nearly a full day before it was extinguished. No one was injured in the fire, but the historic apartments were gutted.

The building's owners initially expressed optimism that it could be restored, but were unable to find a financially viable means of doing so. Eventually, the burned-out structure was demolished in July 2010. The site was redeveloped and is now occupied by a bank building.

Televised footage of the fire was used by AMC's Albuquerque-based television series Breaking Bad to represent the crash of airliner Wayfarer 515 (season 3, episode 1, "No Más").
