= Modern Auto Court =

- U.S. National Register of Historic Places
- NM State Register of Cultural Properties
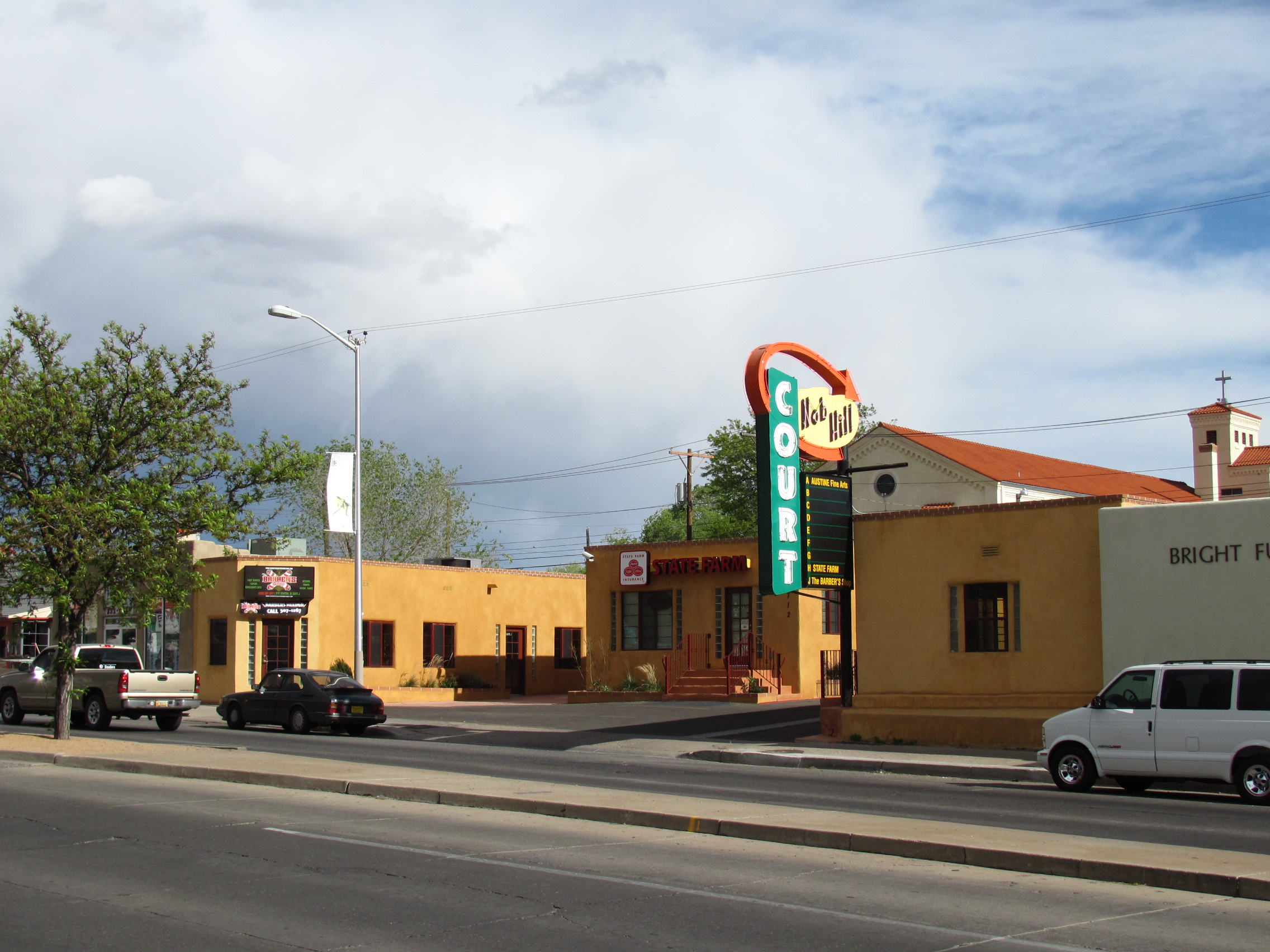

- Location within New Mexico
- Location: 3712 Central Ave. SE., Albuquerque, New Mexico
- Coordinates: 35.079369°N 106.602808°W
- Area: less than one acre
- Built: 1937
- Architectural style: Southwest Vernacular
- MPS: Route 66 through New Mexico MPS
- NRHP reference No.: 93001221
- NMSRCP No.: 1572

Significant dates
- Added to NRHP: November 22, 1993
- Designated NMSRCP: September 17, 1993

Nob Hill Motel, formerly the Modern Auto Court, at 3712 Central Ave. SE. (the original U.S. Route 66) in Albuquerque, New Mexico, was built in 1937. It was listed on the New Mexico State Register of Cultural Properties and the National Register of Historic Places in 1993. The listing included four contributing buildings.

Its architecture is Southwest Vernacular. It is one of few pre-World War II tourist courts remaining along Route 66 in New Mexico. It consists of four one-story buildings.
