= Old Albuquerque Municipal Airport Building =

- U.S. National Register of Historic Places
- NM State Register of Cultural Properties
- Albuquerque Historic Landmark
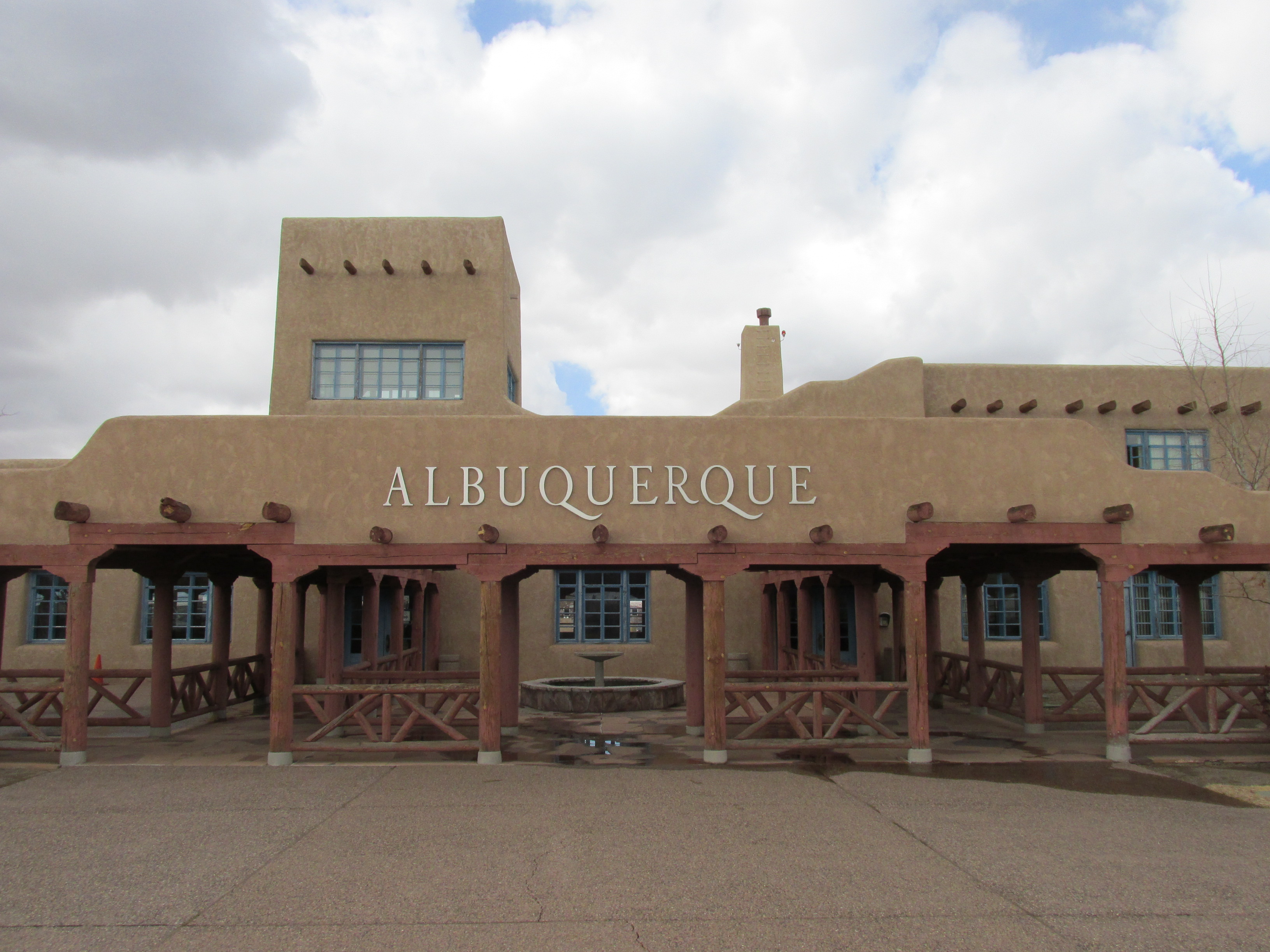

- Location within New Mexico
- Location: 2920 Yale Blvd. SE., Albuquerque, New Mexico
- Coordinates: 35°02′52″N 106°37′14″W
- Area: less than one acre
- Built: 1939
- Built by: City of Albuquerque
- Architect: Ernst H. Blumenthal
- Architectural style: Pueblo Revival, Spanish Colonial, Revival, New Deal
- NRHP reference No.: 89000348
- NMSRCP No.: 482

Significant dates
- Added to NRHP: May 5, 1989
- Designated NMSRCP: December 3, 1976

The Old Albuquerque Municipal Airport Building at 2920 Yale Blvd. SE. in Albuquerque, New Mexico, is a Pueblo Revival building built in 1939. It was listed on the National Register of Historic Places in 1989.

It is a two-story flat-roofed building. It was built in 1939 in labor-intensive construction funded by the Works Progress Administration, using adobe bricks and other local materials. It was designed by the City Architect, Ernst H. Blumenthal. Blumenthal also designed the Monte Vista Fire Station, also listed on the National Register.

The building was used as the passenger terminal for the Albuquerque Municipal Airport (now Albuquerque International Sunport) until the current terminal was built in 1965. It was served by Trans World Airlines, Continental Airlines, Frontier Airlines (1950-1986), and Pioneer Air Lines. The building later served as the first home of the Albuquerque Museum from 1967 to 1979. The building underwent a major rehabilitation in 2002 in which much of it was restored to its original condition of the 1940s.

The Municipal Airport Building has also been known as the William Cutter Memorial Building, a notable aviator.
