= Broadmoor Addition =

- U.S. National Register of Historic Places
- U.S. Historic district
- NM State Register of Cultural Properties
- Location within New Mexico Location within the United States
- Location: Roughly bounded by Brockmont and Copper Aves, Morningside Dr., and Washington St., Albuquerque, New Mexico
- Coordinates: 35°4′58″N 106°35′50″W
- Built: 1945–1955
- NRHP reference No.: 100007699
- NMSRCP No.: 2070

Significant dates
- Added to NRHP: July 5, 2022
- Designated NMSRCP: January 11, 2022

The Broadmoor Addition is a historic district encompassing the residential subdivision of the same name in the Nob Hill neighborhood of Albuquerque, New Mexico.

The development is representative of the post-World War II construction boom in Albuquerque and the neighborhood planning philosophies of the time, with mostly detached single-family houses on curving streets intended as a traffic calming measure. The subdivision was platted in 1945 and was fully built up by around 1955. It consists mostly of small one- to three-bedroom houses, either unstyled or in regional styles like the Pueblo Revival.

The district was added to the New Mexico State Register of Cultural Properties and the National Register of Historic Places in 2022.
