= Jones Motor Company =

- U.S. National Register of Historic Places
- NM State Register of Cultural Properties
- Albuquerque Historic Landmark
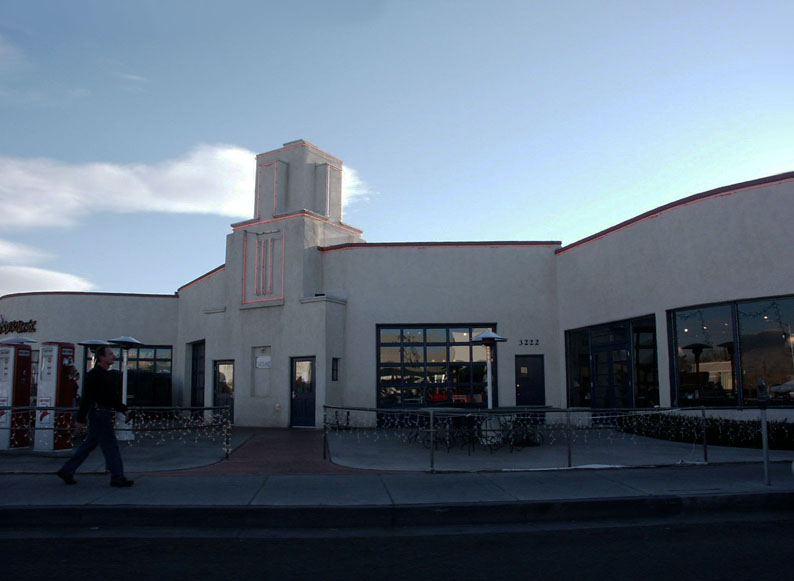
- Location: 3222 Central Avenue SE, Albuquerque, New Mexico
- Coordinates: 35°4′37.72″N 106°37′8.88″W
- Built: 1939
- Architect: Tom Danahy
- Architectural style: Moderne
- MPS: Route 66 through New Mexico MPS
- NRHP reference No.: 93001219
- NMSRCP No.: 1568

Significant dates
- Added to NRHP: November 22, 1993
- Designated NMSRCP: September 17, 1993

Jones Motor Company is a historic U.S. Route 66-era building in Albuquerque, New Mexico. Built in 1939, on Central Avenue in the Nob Hill neighborhood of Albuquerque, the building originally housed Ralph Jones' service station and Ford Motor Company car dealership. It was designed by Tom Danahy in the Streamline Moderne style, with curved garage bays surmounted by a central stepped tower.

Jones Motor Company was added to the New Mexico State Register of Cultural Properties and the National Register of Historic Places in 1993, and was designated as a protected city landmark in 2001. In 2000 it was restored and converted into Kelly's Brew Pub after lying empty for many years. It also houses a Cold Stone Creamery location.
