= Nob Hill Business Center =

- U.S. National Register of Historic Places
- NM State Register of Cultural Properties
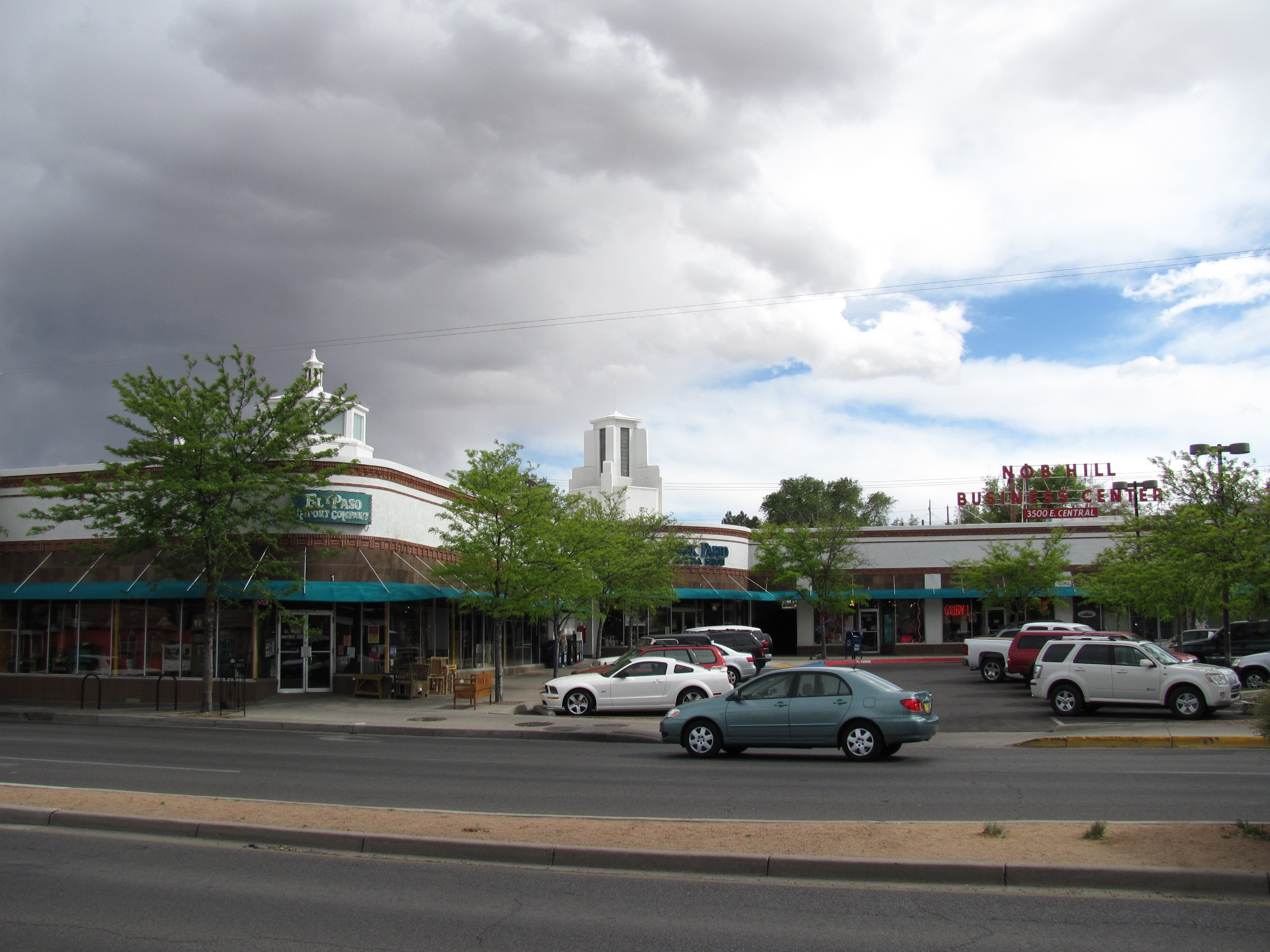
- Nob Hill Business Center, 2010

- Location within New Mexico Location within the United States
- Location: 3500 Central Avenue SE, Albuquerque, New Mexico
- Coordinates: 35°4′46″N 106°36′19″W
- Built: 1947
- Architect: Louis Hesselden
- Architectural style: Streamline Moderne, Territorial Revival
- NRHP reference No.: 84004143
- NMSRCP No.: 991

Significant dates
- Added to NRHP: March 18, 1994
- Designated NMSRCP: December 16, 1983

Nob Hill Business Center is a historic shopping center in Albuquerque, New Mexico. Built in 1946–7, it was the first modern suburban shopping center in New Mexico, and its construction marked a shift away from pedestrian-oriented development in Albuquerque in favor of decentralized, auto-oriented sprawl. Located on Central Avenue (former U.S. Route 66) at Carlisle Boulevard, the building is the focal point of the Nob Hill district.

The shopping center was developed by Robert Waggoman on what was then the eastern fringe of the city, more than two miles from the downtown commercial district. Local commentators dubbed the project "Waggoman's Folly" because it was so far from the center of town, but the shopping center turned out to be a major success and served as a model for future commercial development in Albuquerque. The building was added to the New Mexico State Register of Cultural Properties in 1983 and the National Register of Historic Places in 1994.

Nob Hill Business Center is a one-story, U-shaped building with an interior parking lot facing Central Avenue. The building was designed by Louis Hesselden in a predominantly Streamline Moderne style with rounded corners, decorative towers, and white stucco walls with horizontal bands of terra cotta tile and brick. Some of the architectural features are also reminiscent of the local Territorial Revival style.
