= William J. Leverett House =

Historic house in New Mexico, United States

- U.S. National Register of Historic Places
- U.S. Historic district – Contributing property
- NM State Register of Cultural Properties
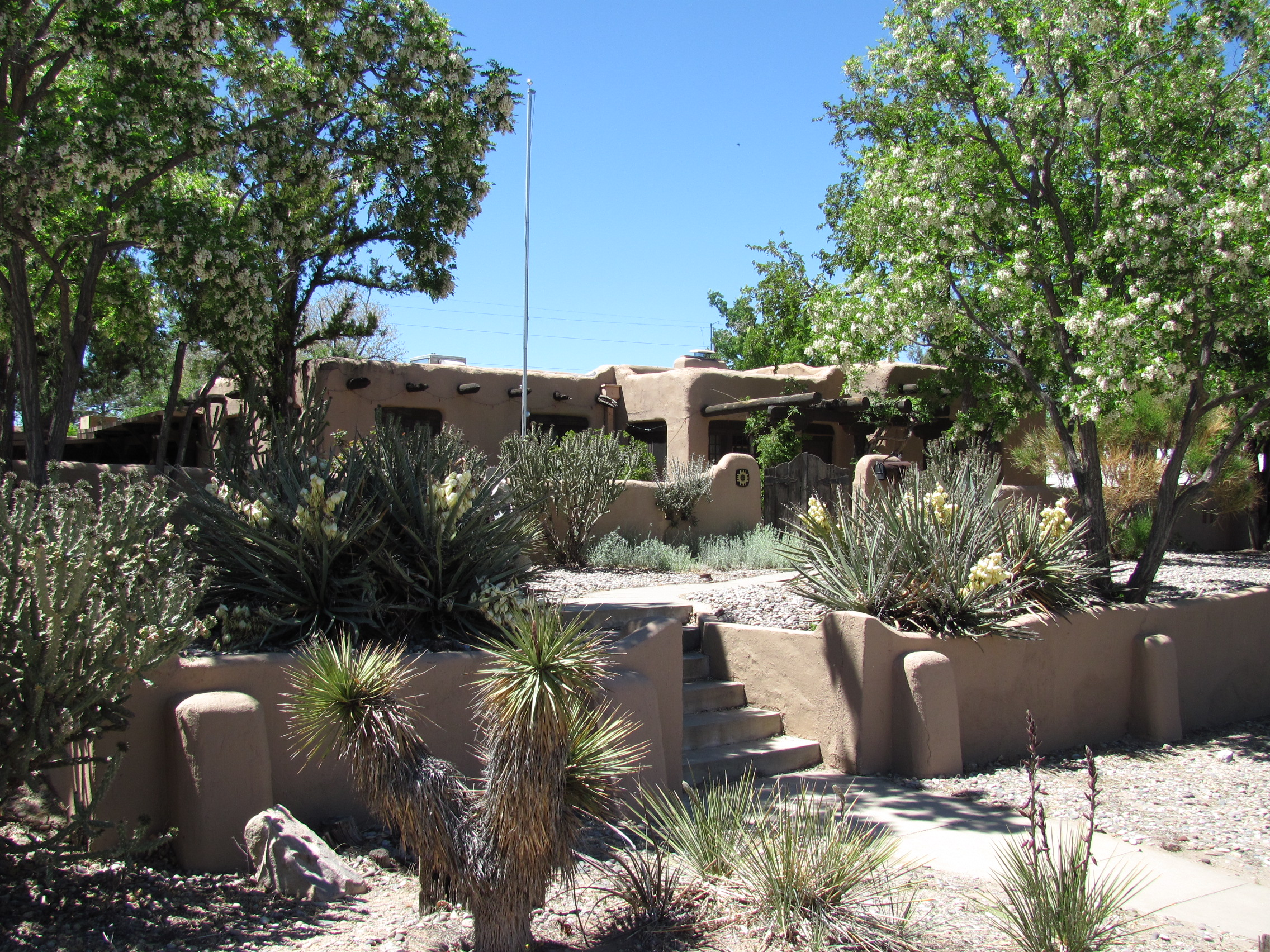
- The house in 2010

- Location within New Mexico Location within the United States
- Location: 301 Dartmouth Dr. NE, Albuquerque, New Mexico
- Coordinates: 35°5′8″N 106°36′44″W
- Built: 1928
- Architectural style: Pueblo Revival
- Part of: Monte Vista and College View Historic District (ID01000770)
- NRHP reference No.: 86000221
- NMSRCP No.: 1212

Significant dates
- Added to NRHP: February 13, 1986
- Designated CP: August 3, 2001
- Designated NMSRCP: November 22, 1985

The William J. Leverett House is a historic house in the Nob Hill neighborhood of Albuquerque, New Mexico. It was built in 1928 and is a notable early example of the Pueblo Revival style. The property was listed on the New Mexico State Register of Cultural Properties in 1985 and the National Register of Historic Places in 1986. It is also a contributing property in the Monte Vista and College View Historic District.

The house was built as a personal residence and model home by William J. Leverett, the developer of the surrounding Monte Vista subdivision. It has been compared to the James N. Gladding House, which is also a Pueblo-style model home built around the same time in the Spruce Park neighborhood. The Leverett house is roughly rectangular in plan, one story high, and constructed from stuccoed adobe. It displays many characteristics of the Pueblo style such as vigas, irregular parapets, and front and rear portales or porticos with log posts and corbels.
