= Granada Heights =

- U.S. National Register of Historic Places
- U.S. Historic district
- NM State Register of Cultural Properties
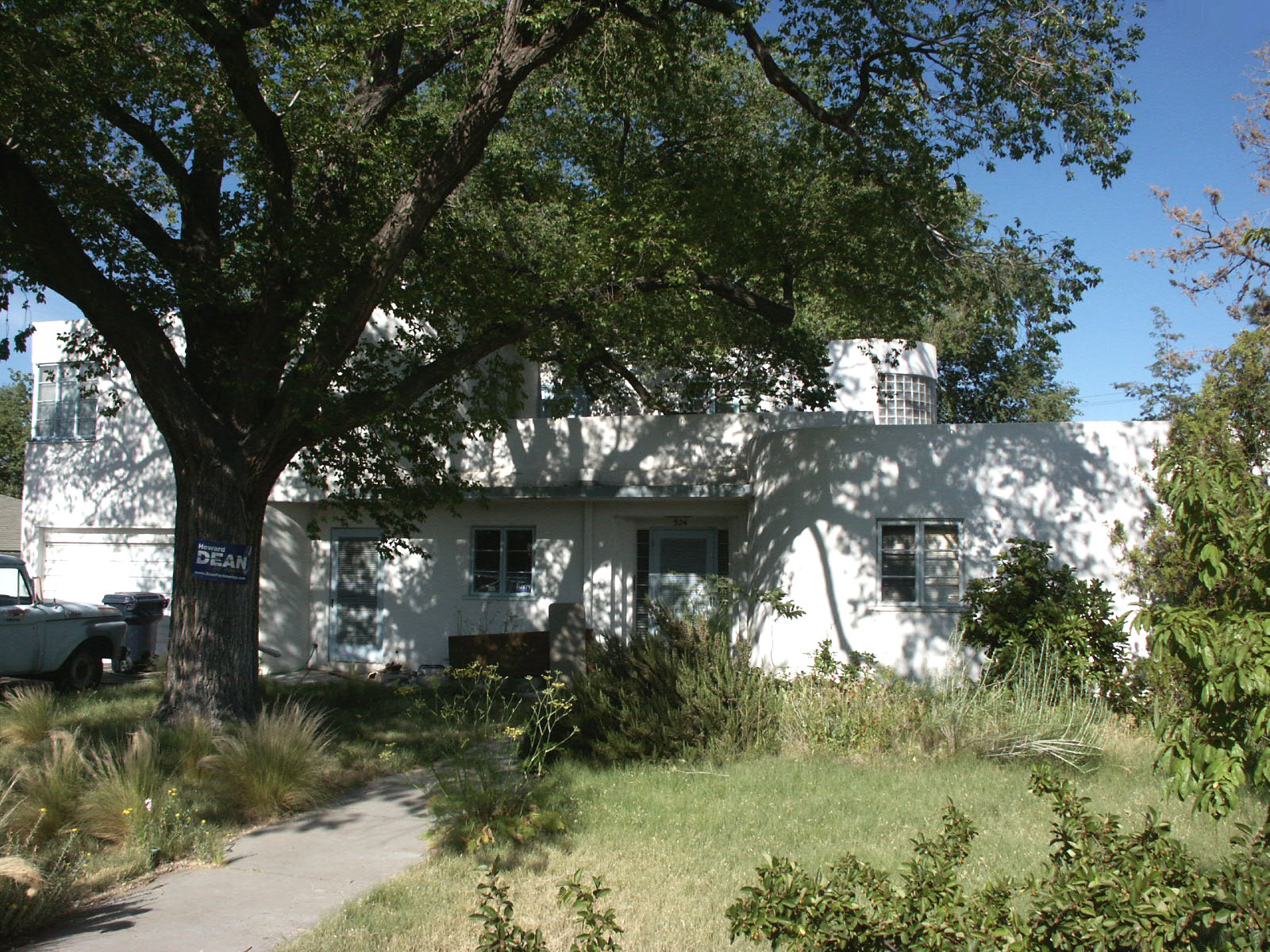
- Kelvinator House at 324 Hermosa Dr. SE

- Location within New Mexico Location within the United States
- Location: Roughly bounded by Silver and Garfield Aves., Carlisle Blvd., and Morningside Dr., Albuquerque, New Mexico
- Coordinates: 35°4′32″N 106°36′8″W
- NRHP reference No.: 100007700
- NMSRCP No.: 2069

Significant dates
- Added to NRHP: July 5, 2022
- Designated NMSRCP: January 11, 2022

Granada Heights is a historic district encompassing the residential subdivision of the same name in the Nob Hill neighborhood of Albuquerque, New Mexico.

The district is notable as an example of residential urban planning from the midcentury period, as well as for its architecture. Granada Heights was platted in 1925 by Katherine B. Patterson, who was also locally known as a temperance movement and women's suffrage activist. Most of the houses were built between the 1920s and 1950s and exemplify various styles including Spanish Colonial Revival, Pueblo Revival, and International Style, as well as unstyled Ranch and split-level houses. Contributing properties in the district include Immanuel Presbyterian Church and the Kelvinator House.

Granada Heights was added to the New Mexico State Register of Cultural Properties and the National Register of Historic Places in 2022.
