= Aztec Motel =

Coordinates: 35°4′46.5″N 106°36′4.5″W

- Aztec Auto Court
- U.S. National Register of Historic Places
- NM State Register of Cultural Properties
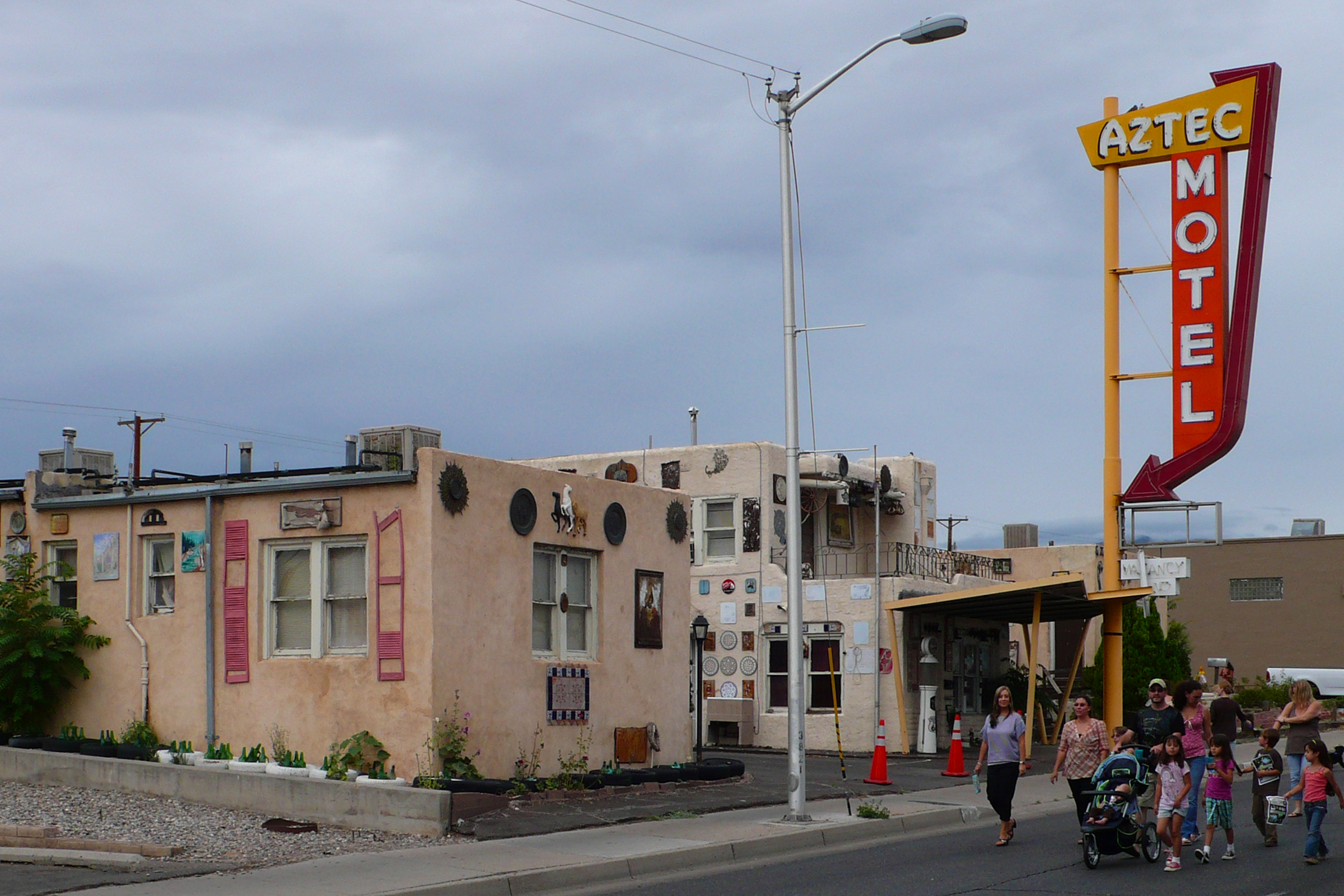
- Aztec Motel in 2010
- Location: 3821 Central Avenue NE, Albuquerque, New Mexico
- Built: 1932
- Demolished: 2011
- NRHP reference No.: 93001217
- NMSRCP No.: 1571

Significant dates
- Added to NRHP: November 22, 1993
- Designated NMSRCP: September 17, 1993

The Aztec Motel, also known as the Aztec Auto Court or Aztec Lodge, was a historic motel located on former U.S. Route 66 in the Upper Nob Hill neighborhood of Albuquerque, New Mexico, United States. Until its demolition in 2011 it was the oldest continuously-operating Route 66 motel in New Mexico and "one of the five most important motels left" in Albuquerque.

== History ==
The Aztec Motel was built in 1932 as the first of what would eventually be dozens of auto courts lining Central Avenue, which became U.S. Route 66 4 years later. During a remodeling of the building in the 1950s, the garages were walled in, bringin the number of units from 13 to 17, and a new neon sign replaced the original one.

It was listed on the New Mexico State Register of Cultural Properties and the National Register of Historic Places in 1993. The building was well known locally for its exterior decorations, which consisted of hundreds of found objects assembled in the 1990s by a resident of the motel. The work was described in the Albuquerque Journal as a "beloved local folk art installation".

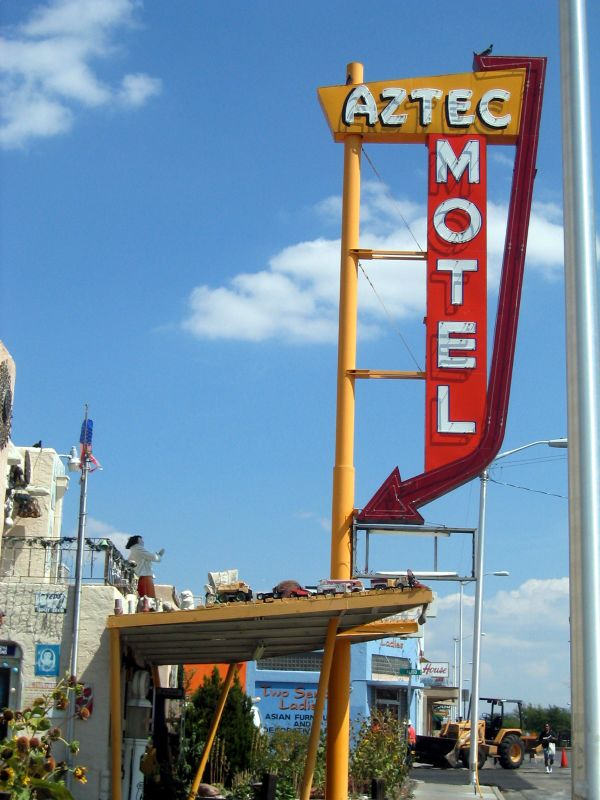
Aztec Motel sign seen from Central Ave.

In 2003, the Aztec Motel received a fund from the National Park Service Route 66 Corridor Preservation Program to restore its neon sign.

The Aztec Motel was razed in early June 2011. The motel's owners cited its deteriorating condition and high maintenance costs as reasons for the demolition, estimating the building would cost $1 million to renovate. The motel's neon sign was left standing and was intended to be part of future development on the site. However, the sign ended up being removed in March 2015. The city declared its intention to restore and reinstall it at a to-be-determined location.

== See also ==
- List of motels
