= Lembke House =

Historic house in New Mexico, United States

- U.S. National Register of Historic Places
- NM State Register of Cultural Properties
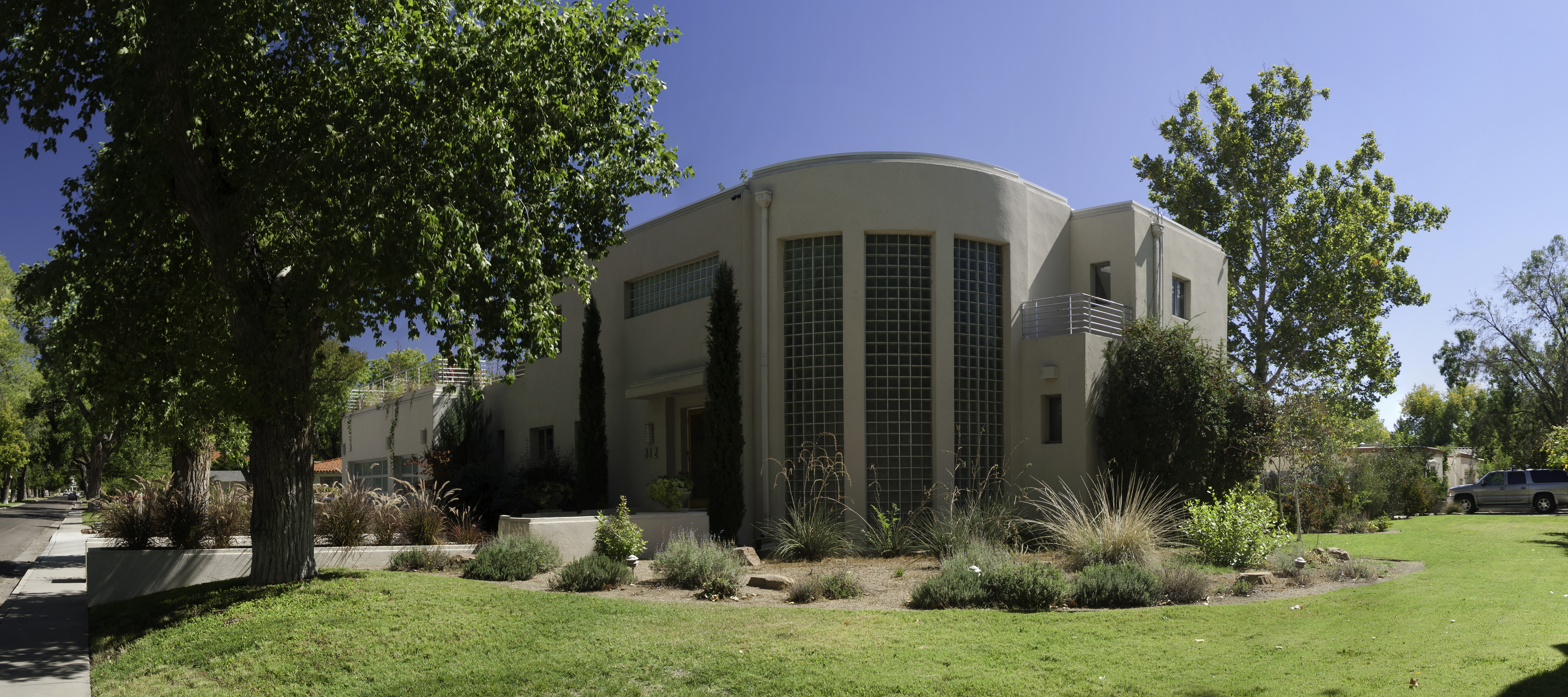
- The house in 2014

- Location within New Mexico Location within the United States
- Location: 312 Laguna Blvd. SW, Albuquerque, New Mexico
- Coordinates: 35°5′18″N 106°40′5″W
- Built: 1937
- Architect: Townes & Funk
- Architectural style: International
- NRHP reference No.: 80002541
- NMSRCP No.: 467

Significant dates
- Added to NRHP: November 25, 1980
- Designated NMSRCP: August 27, 1976

The Lembke House is a historic house in Albuquerque, New Mexico, and one of the best examples of residential International Style architecture in the city. It was built in 1937 by Charles H. Lembke (1889–1989), a local construction company owner who was also Chairman of the City Commission during the time he occupied the house. It was one of the earlier houses in the Huning Castle neighborhood, an area of large homes that was mostly developed between the 1930s and 1950s. The house was probably constructed as a speculative venture as Lembke lived there for less than a year before selling it. The house was added to the New Mexico State Register of Cultural Properties in 1976 and the National Register of Historic Places in 1980.

The house is two stories high with a basement and is constructed from reinforced concrete. The defining feature of the building is a rounded corner with three vertical bands of glass brick extending almost the full height of the house which is oriented toward the adjacent street corner. The interior of this feature contains an entry atrium and curving stairwell. The house also has a semi-cylindrical protrusion on the rear elevation, but is otherwise mostly rectangular in plan. The interior includes living, dining, and study space on the ground floor along with maid's quarters, and three bedrooms and two exterior balconies on the second floor. The basement contains a den, hobby room, and utilities. Metal casement windows, steel railings, and bird's eye maple flooring are used throughout. The house was designed by Townes & Funk, an architecture firm based in Amarillo, Texas.
