= Immanuel Presbyterian Church (Albuquerque, New Mexico) =

Historic church in New Mexico, United States

- U.S. National Register of Historic Places
- U.S. Historic district – Contributing property
- NM State Register of Cultural Properties
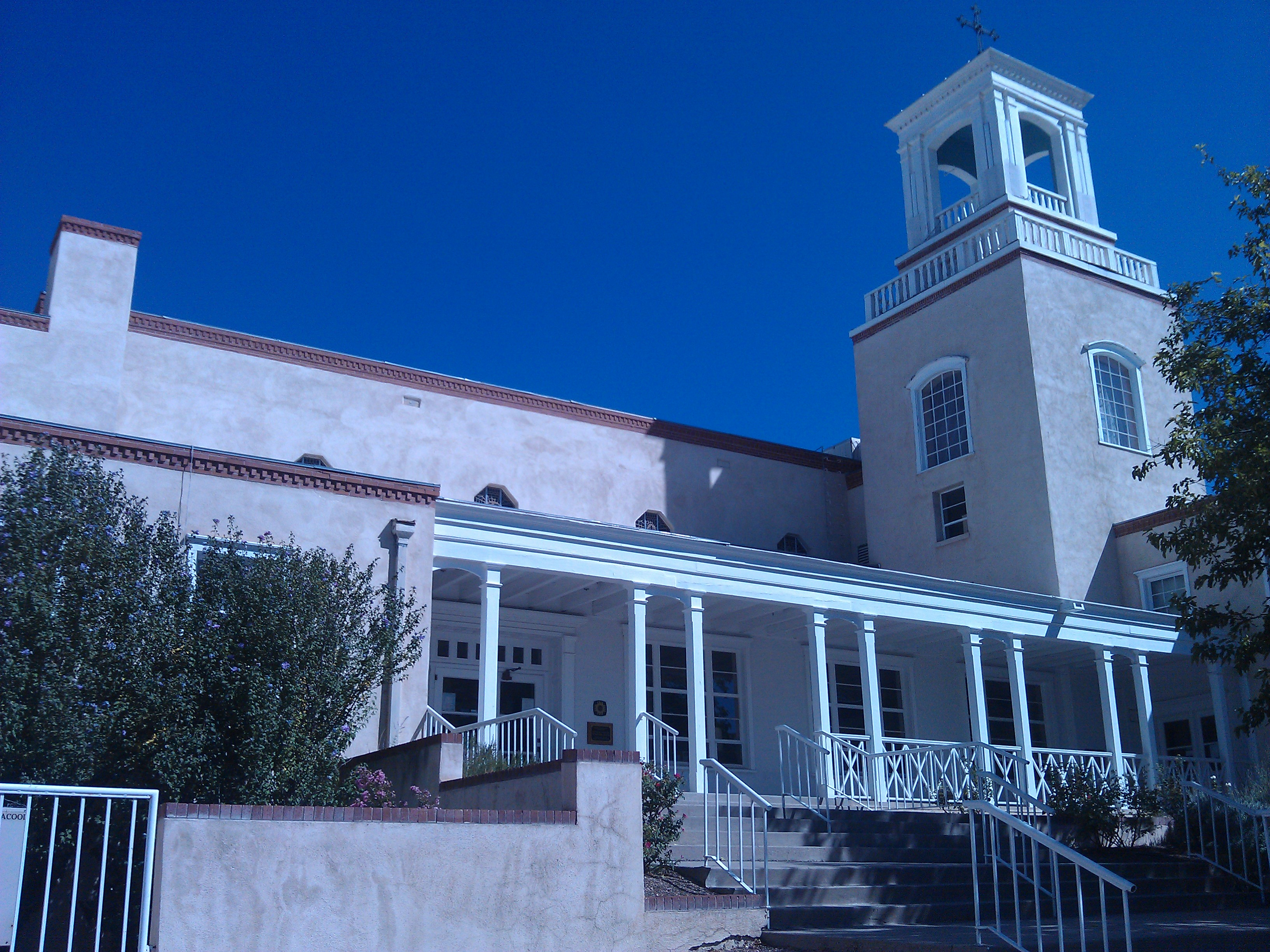

- Location within New Mexico Location within the United States
- Location: 114 Carlisle Boulevard SE, Albuquerque, New Mexico
- Coordinates: 35.078611°N 106.604167°W
- Built: 1950 with additions in 1951 and 1956
- Architect: John Gaw Meem
- Part of: Granada Heights (ID100007700)
- MPS: Buildings Designed by John Gaw Meem MPS
- NRHP reference No.: 11000032
- NMSRCP No.: 1868

Significant dates
- Added to NRHP: February 22, 2011
- Designated CP: July 5, 2022
- Designated NMSRCP: June 11, 2004

Immanuel Presbyterian Church is a historic church at 114 Carlisle Boulevard SE in Albuquerque, New Mexico. The building was designed by architect John Gaw Meem and was built in three phases between 1949 and 1956. It was added to the New Mexico State Register of Cultural Properties in 2004 and the National Register of Historic Places in 2011. In 2022, it was also listed as a contributing property in the Granada Heights historic district.

It was listed along with a number of other Meem works, as part of a study of multiple works by the architect.
