= Silver Hill, Albuquerque =

- Silver Hill Historic District
- U.S. National Register of Historic Places
- NM State Register of Cultural Properties
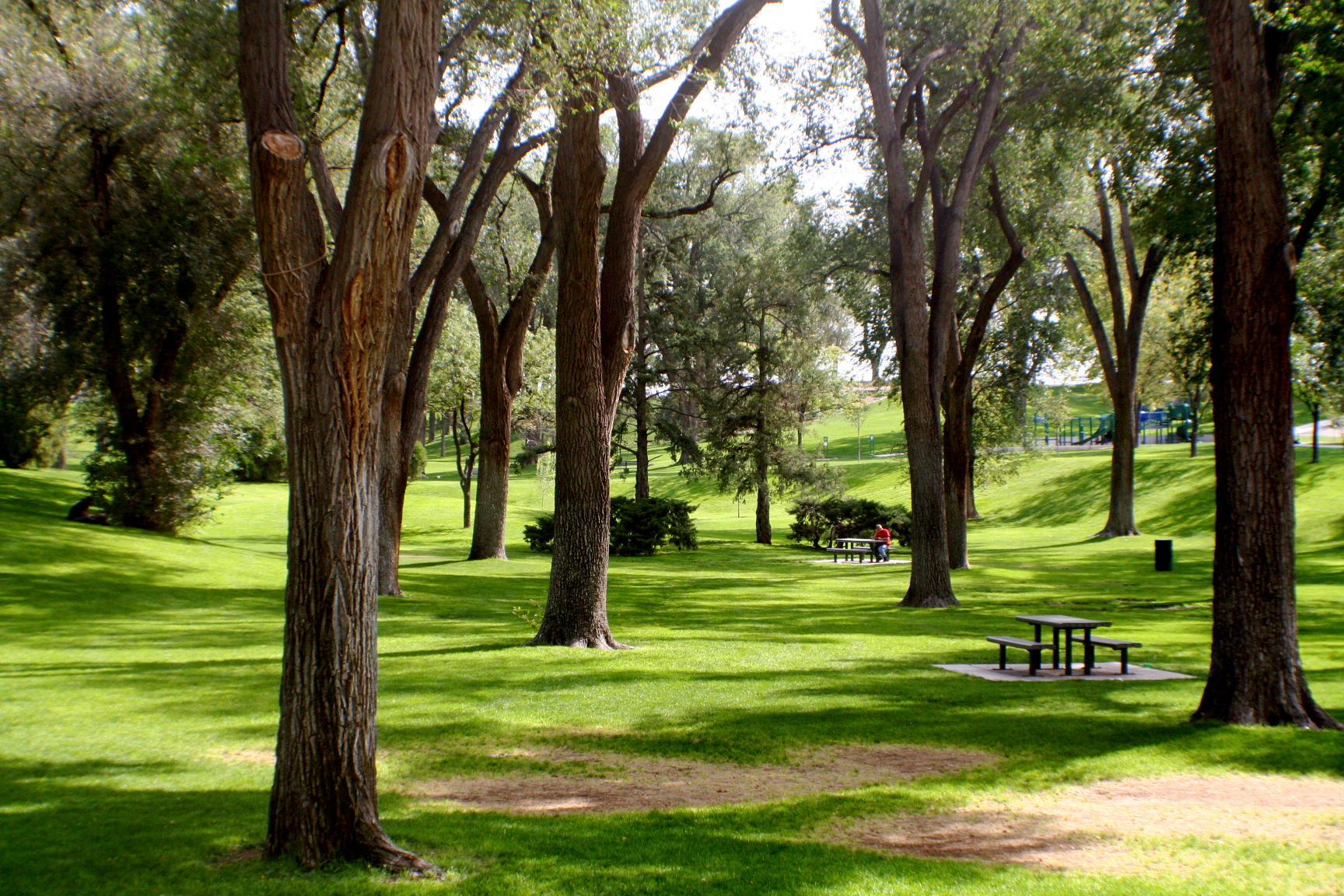
- Roosevelt Park

- Location within New Mexico
- Location: Albuquerque, New Mexico
- Coordinates: 35°04′47″N 106°37′46″W
- Architectural style: Bungalow, Craftsman
- NRHP reference No.: 86002414
- NMSRCP No.: 1254

Significant dates
- Added to NRHP: September 18, 1986
- Designated NMSRCP: February 28, 1986

Silver Hill is a neighborhood in southeast Albuquerque, New Mexico, which is significant as one of the oldest developments on the city's East Mesa. Much of the neighborhood is included in the Silver Hill Historic District, which was listed on the National Register of Historic Places in 1986. The neighborhood is roughly bounded by Central Avenue, Yale Boulevard, Central New Mexico Community College, and Presbyterian Hospital. The northeast corner of the neighborhood borders the University of New Mexico campus.
