= Lobo Theater =

Movie theater

Coordinates: 35°4′51.2″N 106°36′40.9″W

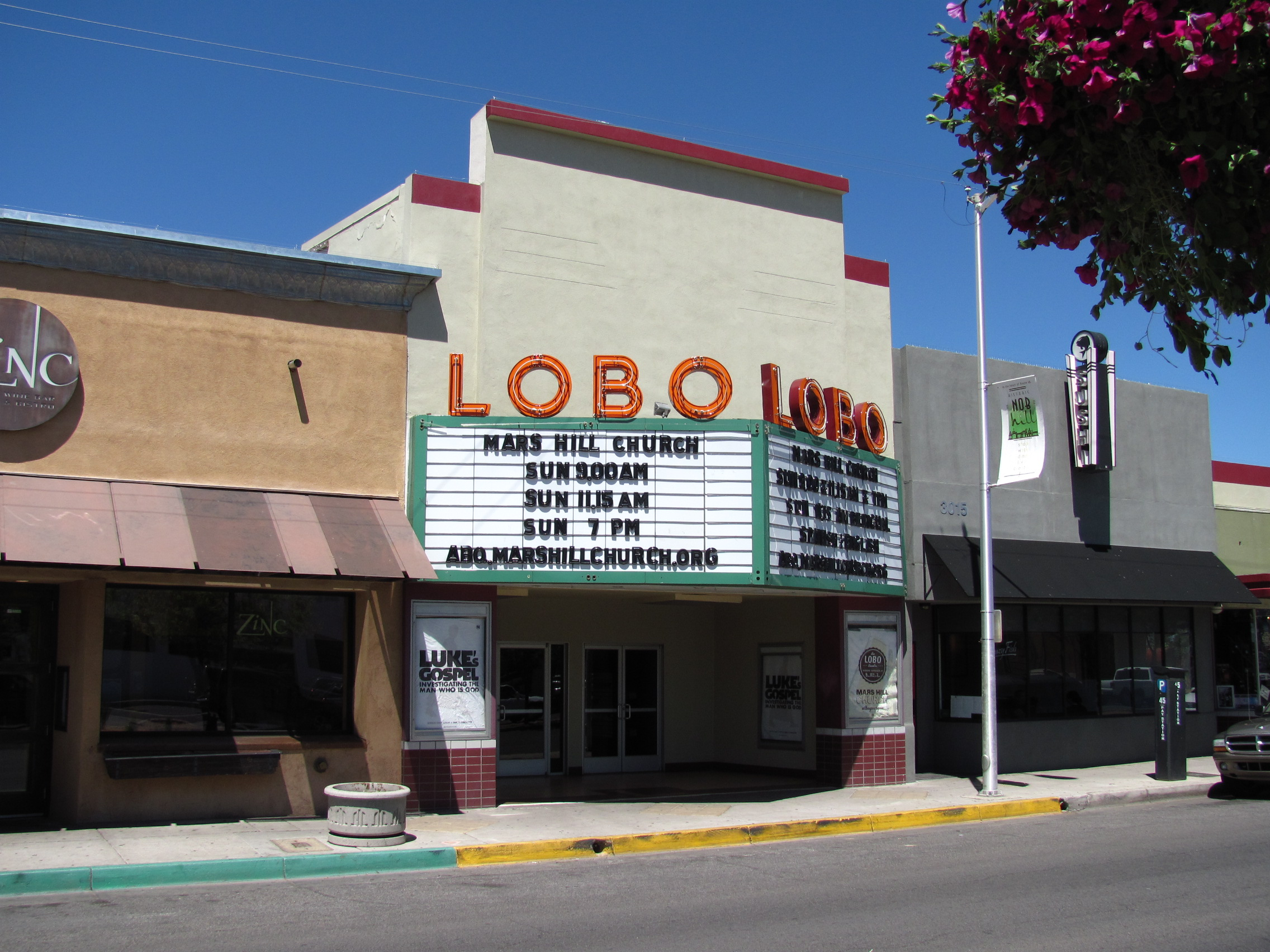
Lobo Theater

The Historic Lobo Theater & Event Center is a movie theater, concert venue, and event venue located along historic Route 66, at 3013 Central Avenue NE in Albuquerque, New Mexico in the United States of America.

The Lobo Theater first opened on August 19, 1938. By the early-1940’s it was operated by Paramount Pictures Inc. through their subsidiary Hoblitzelle & O'Donnell. The name Lobo ("Wolf" in Spanish) references the nickname for the sports teams, and students, at the University of New Mexico, which is nearly adjacent to the west. The theater reached out to area students and was a premiere venue for independent, classic and cult films. It also hosted concerts with local bands.

By 1964, the theatre was operated by Frontier Theatres. It has also been operated by Commonwealth Theaters, Creative Entertainment, and as of 2022, it was operated and owned by J. Richard Rivas of Savir LLC/Commercial Real Estate Services.

The theater closed on August 4, 2000, later leased to a church.

It was the primary setting for the 2002 independent film Collecting Rooftops. This film was directed by Billy Garberina and Rob Kellar. It started filming while the theater was under Bobby (Robert) McMullan's operation and finished its filming, in the theater, by the generosity of Amon Re (musician).

The Historic Lobo Theater reopened in late 2021 as the Lobo Lounge and Events Center.
