= Central Avenue (Albuquerque) =

Street in Albuquerque, New Mexico, United States

- Length: 17.4 mi (28.0 km)
- Location: Bernalillo County, New Mexico, United States
- West end: NM 500 west of Albuquerque
- Major junctions: NM 345; NM 45; NM 47; I-25; NM 556
- East end: I-40 / NM 333

Central Avenue is a major east–west street in Albuquerque, New Mexico, United States, which historically served as the city's main thoroughfare and principal axis of development. It runs through many of Albuquerque's oldest neighborhoods, including Downtown, Old Town, Nob Hill, and the University of New Mexico area. Central Avenue was part of U.S. Route 66 from 1937 until the highway's decommissioning in 1985 and also forms one axis of Albuquerque's house numbering system. It was also signed as Business Loop 40 until the early 1990s when ownership of Central Avenue was transferred from the New Mexico State Highway Department to the City of Albuquerque.

== Route ==
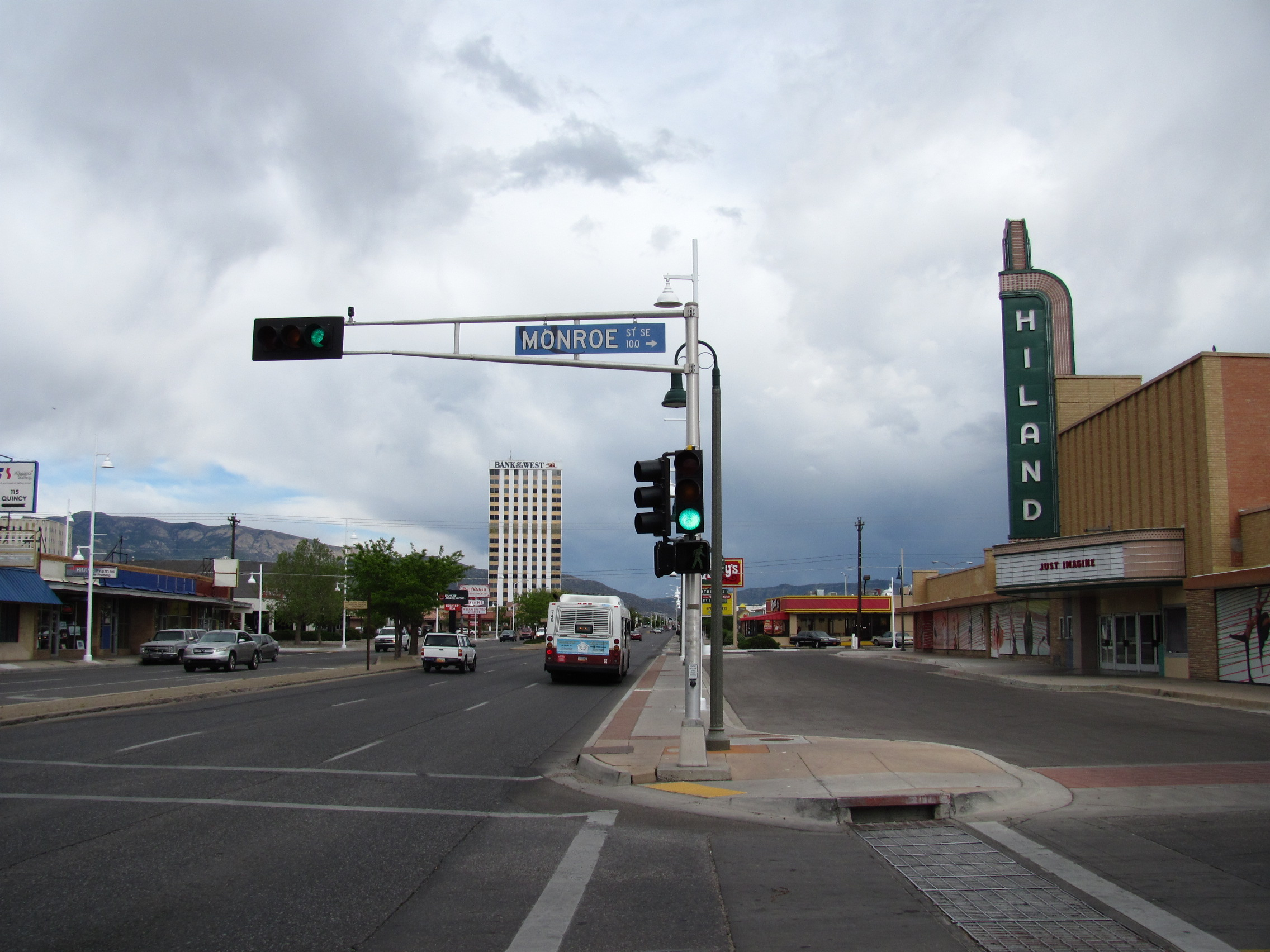
East Central

Central follows a primarily east–west alignment from Paseo del Volcán (Atrisco Vista Boulevard) on the western outskirts of the city to Four Hills Road just east of Tramway Boulevard (NM 556) near the mouth of Tijeras Canyon. Both ends terminate at Interstate 40, which replaced US 66 as the primary east–west route through Albuquerque. Along the way Central passes through the historic Old Town, Downtown, EDo, Huning Highlands, Silver Hill, University, Nob Hill, and Highland neighborhoods. The street crosses the Rio Grande just southwest of Old Town, passing through the old neighborhood of Atrisco. Central then passes through the heart of Albuquerque's west side before climbing Nine Mile Hill on the city's western limits.

== History ==
=== Early history ===
The route that is now Central Avenue has existed in some form since prehistoric times, linking Tijeras Canyon and points east with a good ford of the Rio Grande near present-day Old Town. Originally a Native American trading route, the trail later connected Albuquerque with the outlying settlement of Carnuel. It was upgraded to a wagon road by the U.S. Army in 1858.

The Atchison, Topeka, and Santa Fe Railway reached Albuquerque in 1880, but for logistical reasons the tracks were routed some two miles east of the existing town. This led to the establishment of a separate "New Town" around the railroad depot, which was built on the preexisting Carnuel road. When the original downtown street grid was laid out that same year, this road between Old Town and New Town became Railroad Avenue. A mule-drawn streetcar line was soon established.

=== Rise to prominence ===
By the turn of the century, Railroad Avenue had been clearly established as Albuquerque's main commercial corridor, and in 1907 the city council decided to rename the street to better reflect this fact. As reported in the Albuquerque Journal, "The name of 'Central Avenue' it is believed, will at once convey the idea that it is the city's main business street and the center of town." A new electric streetcar line was installed in 1904. Meanwhile, the city grew eastward along Central, driven in part by the establishment of the University of New Mexico on the East Mesa in 1889. The early 20th century saw an influx of tuberculosis patients seeking the healthful effects of Albuquerque's dry climate, and a number of sanatoria were established on a stretch of East Central that came to be known as "TB Avenue." One of these survived to the present day as Presbyterian Hospital.

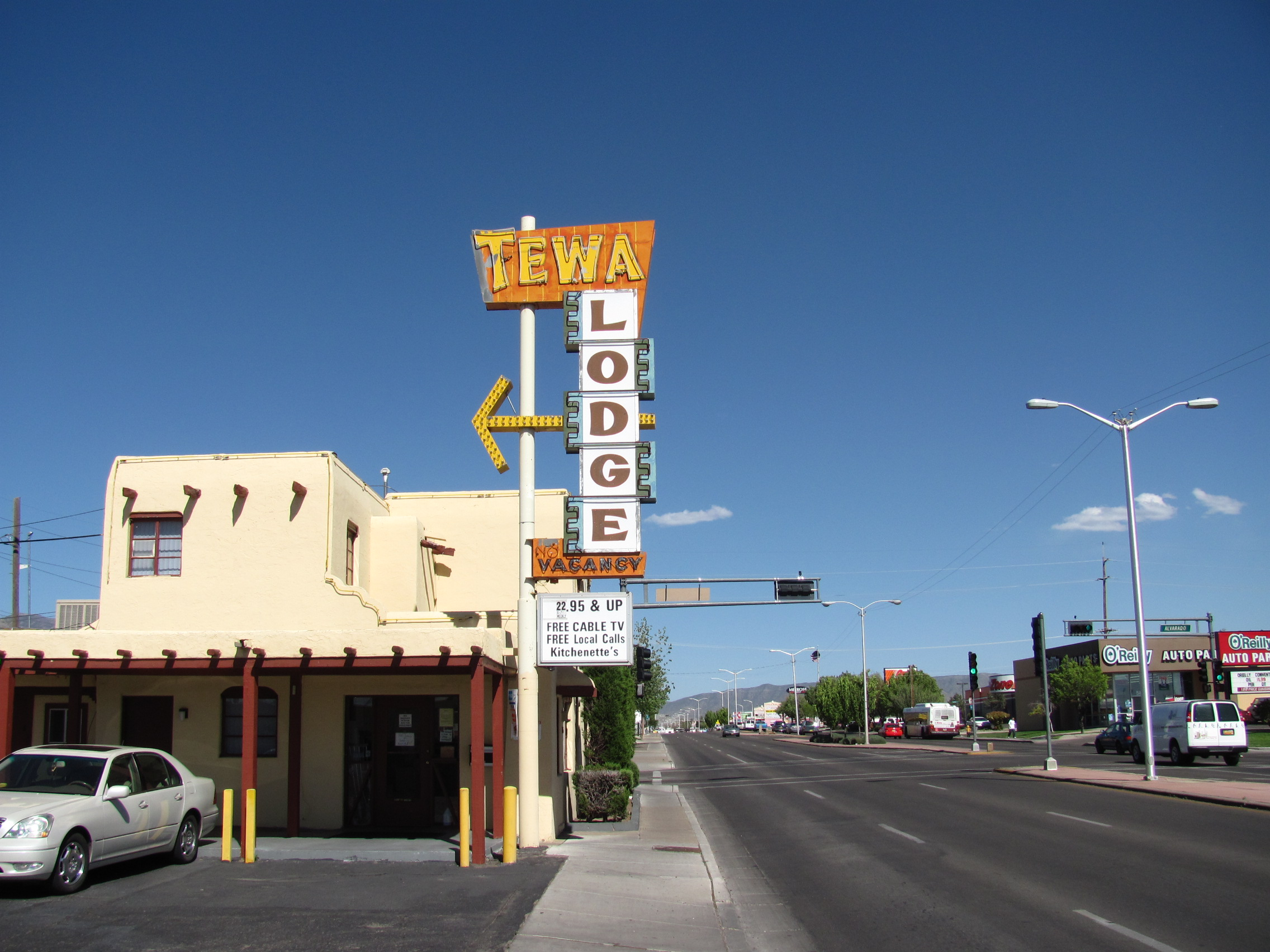
Tewa Lodge, a Route 66-era motel on East Central

With the increasing usage of the automobile in the 1920s, Central became a hub for car dealerships, service stations, and related enterprise. This role increased dramatically in 1937 when, with New Deal funding secured by governor Clyde Tingley, US 66 through Albuquerque was realigned from Fourth Street to a more direct east–west route along Central. The road was extended west across the Rio Grande and paved along its entire length, while the grade crossing downtown was eliminated with a new underpass. Dozens of new motels, diners, and filling stations sprang up along East and West Central to cater to the steady stream of travelers passing through the city. By 1955, there were 98 motels along Central Avenue.

=== Decline and renewal ===
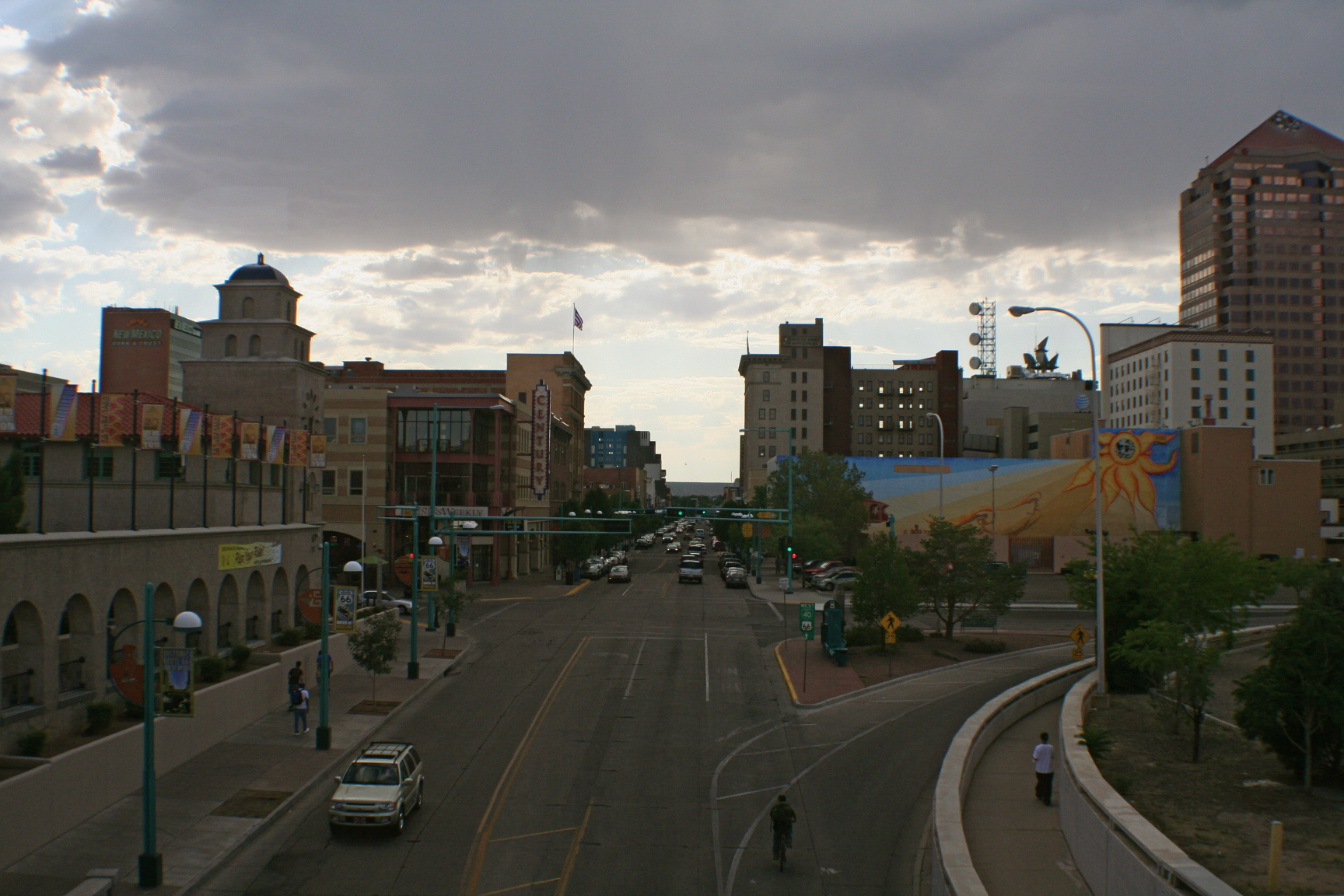
Central Avenue in Downtown in 2009

Central entered an economic decline in the 1960s as Albuquerque became increasingly decentralized. I-40 provided travelers with a faster and more convenient east–west route through Albuquerque, while the new Winrock and Coronado shopping centers drew customers away from the older retail districts on Central. The large downtown Alvarado and Franciscan hotels were demolished in the early 1970s and Albuquerque High School moved to a new location in 1973, leaving its old campus at Central and Broadway boarded up.

The street's fortunes began to turn around in the early 1980s with the successful renovation of the KiMo Theater, a treasured landmark which had been threatened with demolition. Over the next two decades, downtown Central Avenue was gradually transformed into an arts and entertainment district with a variety of bars, restaurants, galleries, and live music venues, as well as new residential space. Nob Hill has also rebounded, with an eclectic mix of mostly locally owned businesses.

== Landmarks ==
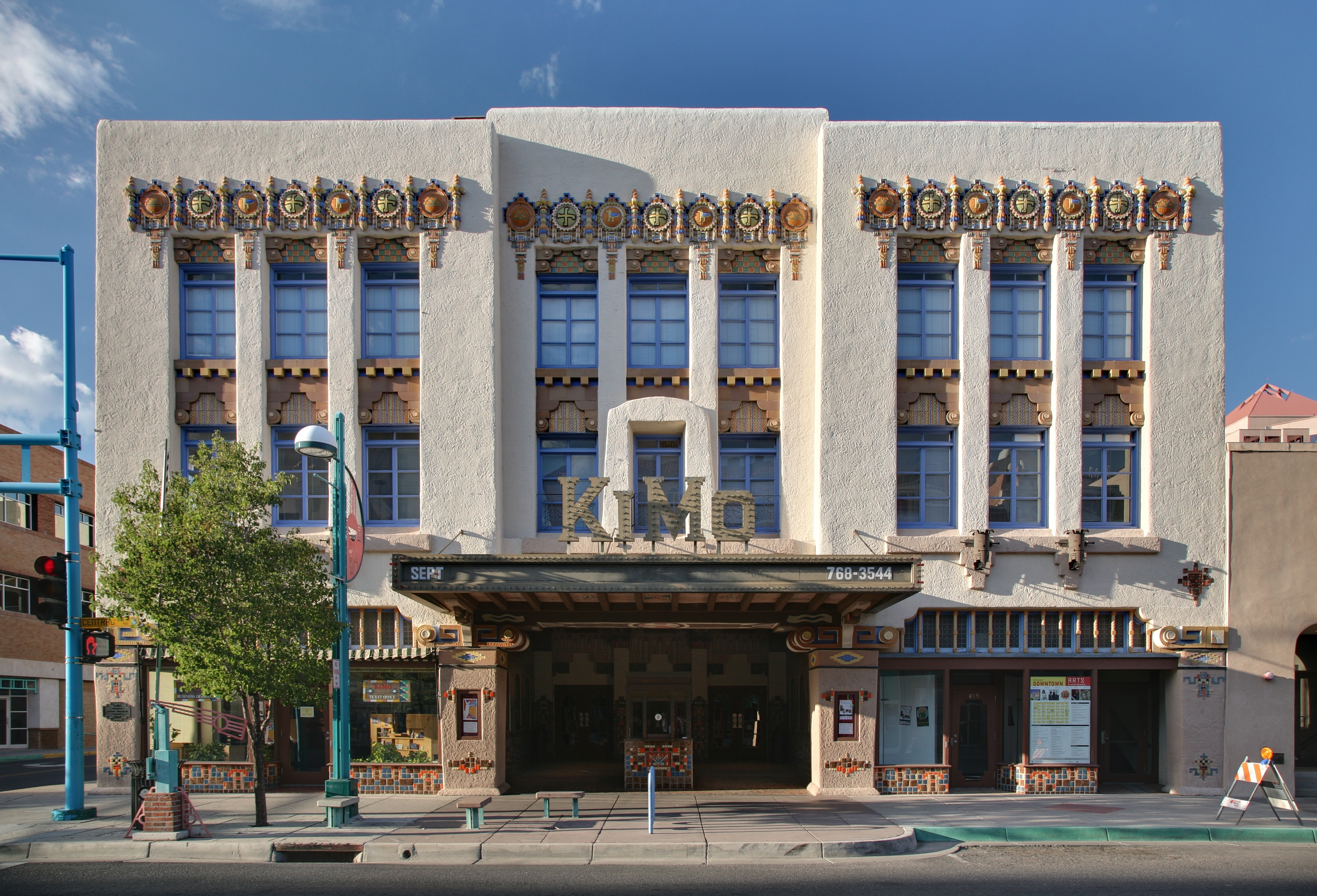
The KiMo Theater

Central has a large number of surviving Route 66-era commercial buildings as well as earlier buildings downtown and in Old Town.

=== West Central ===
Unlike most of downtown Albuquerque, the streetscape of Central Avenue has remained mostly intact since the early 20th century. Notable buildings include the Pueblo Deco-style KiMo Theater, the Sunshine Building, and the First National Bank Building, which was Albuquerque's first skyscraper. Robinson Park, a rare remnant of the railroad era, is located on a triangular block between Eighth and Tenth Streets.

La Glorieta, a Spanish hacienda dating back to the seventeenth century, is believed to be the oldest building on Central. It is now a part of Manzano Day School.

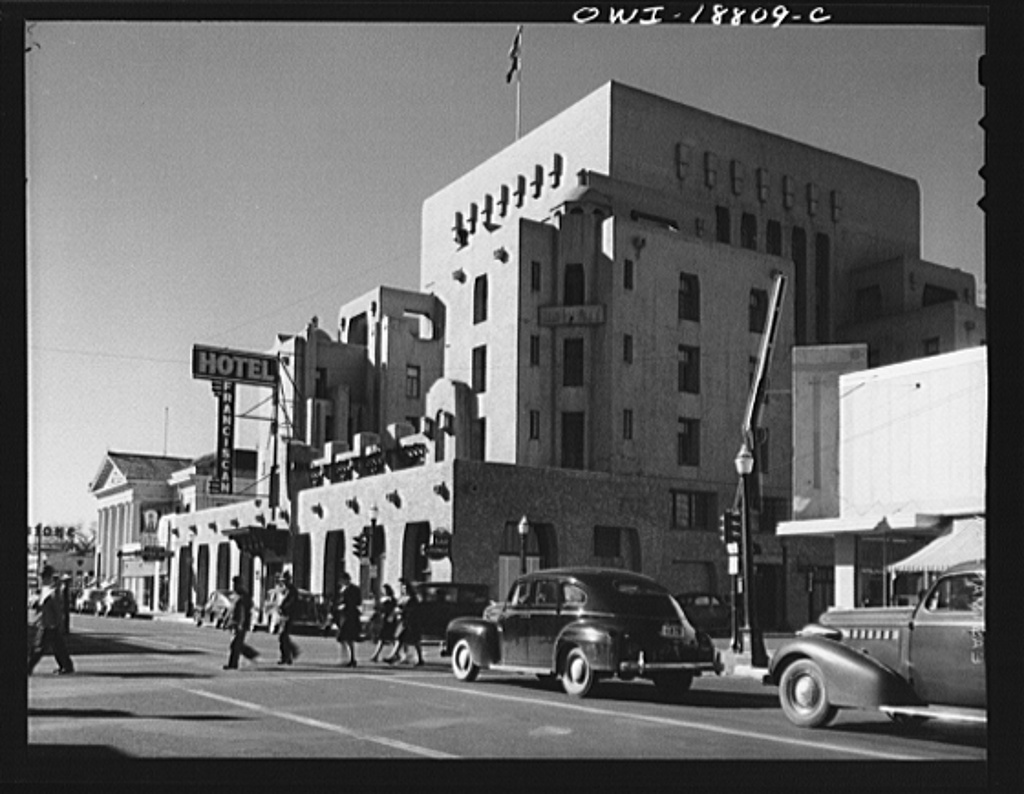
Franciscan Hotel

=== East Central ===
Two major landmarks on East Central are the University of New Mexico main campus and Expo New Mexico, the site of the New Mexico State Fair. The former Albuquerque High School campus at Central and Broadway has been converted to loft apartments. The Nob Hill neighborhood is home to a number of Route 66-era commercial buildings including Jones Motor Company, the Nob Hill Business Center, and the Lobo Theater. The 17-story Bank of the West Tower at Central and San Mateo is a highly visible landmark.

=== Former landmarks ===
Some of Albuquerque's most famous former landmarks were located on Central, including the Alvarado Hotel, the Franciscan Hotel, the Castle Huning mansion, and the old Bernalillo County Courthouse in Old Town. More recently the list has also grown to include the Castle Apartments on West Central and the Aztec Motel in Nob Hill.

== Transportation ==
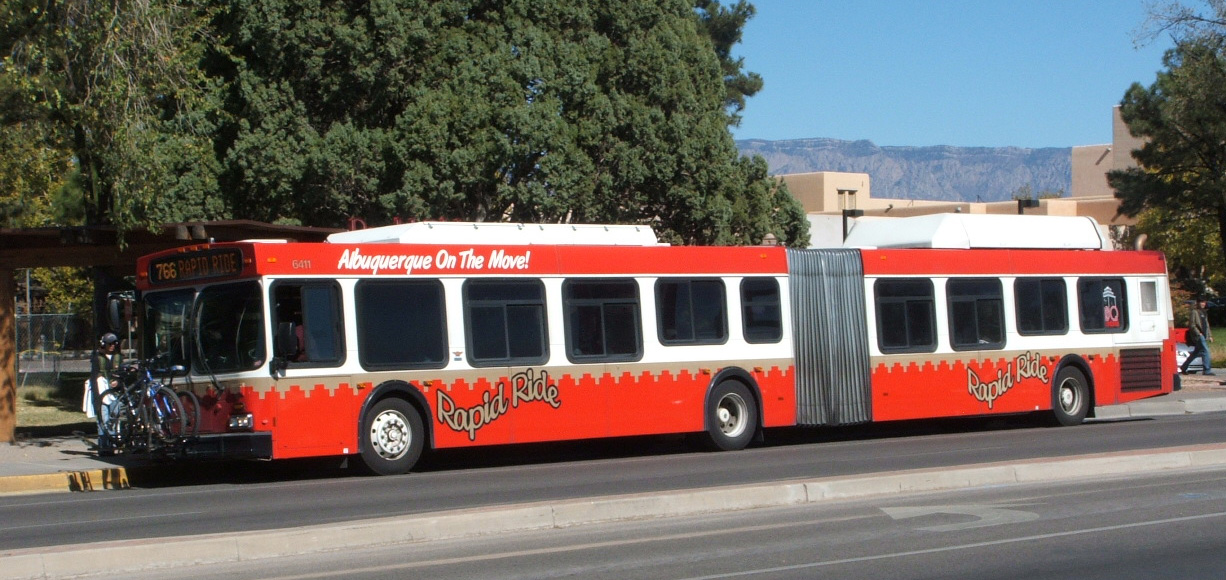
A Rapid Ride bus on Central

The Central Avenue public transit corridor is the most heavily traveled in the city with 350,000 monthly boardings in 2006. ABQ RIDE operates three city bus routes on Central: the 66 Central local route and the 766 Red Line and 777 Green Line Rapid Ride express routes. The Alvarado Transportation Center, located at First and Central, provides access to many other ABQ RIDE routes as well as Greyhound Lines, the Amtrak Southwest Chief, and the New Mexico Rail Runner Express commuter train.

Formerly, Central was also served by an electric street railway between 1904 and 1928. The City Electric Company owned twelve streetcars and provided service on a three-mile route between Old Town Plaza and the university. Another former transportation facility on Central was the West Mesa Airport, which operated from 1929 to 1967.

In 2006, the city proposed building a new streetcar line along Central between Old Town and Nob Hill. With no clear source of funding, the project eventually fell victim to widespread opposition from the City Council and the public.

Albuquerque Rapid Transit was introduced in 2017, bringing bus rapid transit service to Central Avenue via dedicated bus lanes and transit priority signals.
