= House at 380 Albion Street =

Historic house in Massachusetts, United States

- U.S. National Register of Historic Places
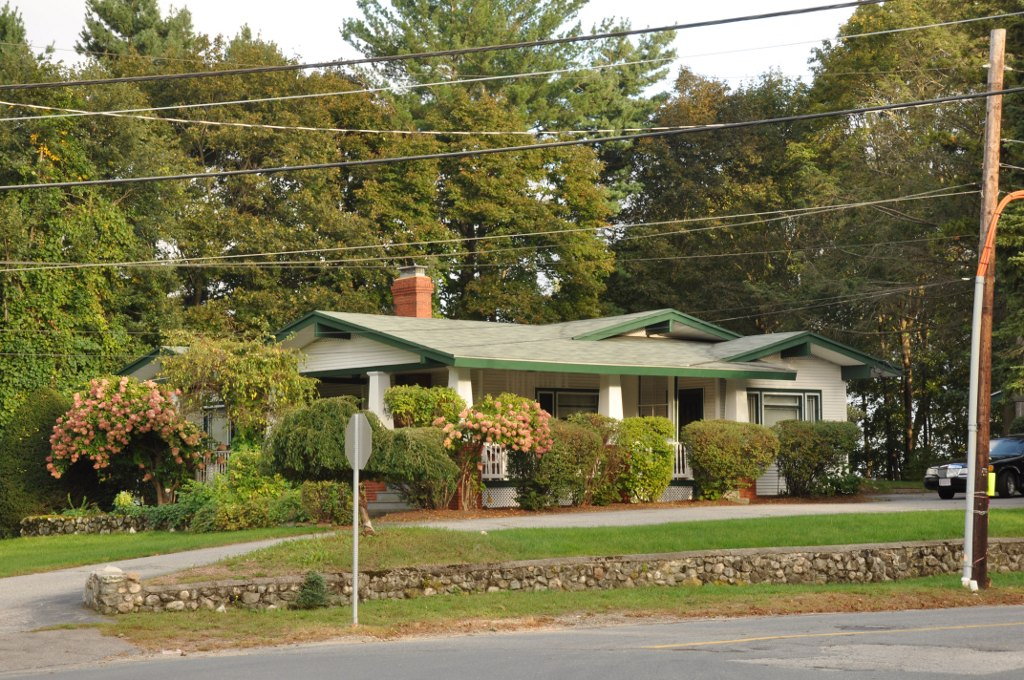

- Location within Massachusetts Location within the United States
- Location: 380 Albion St., Wakefield, Massachusetts
- Coordinates: 42°29′32″N 71°5′8″W
- Area: less than one acre
- Built: 1910
- Architectural style: Bungalow/Craftsman
- MPS: Wakefield MRA
- NRHP reference No.: 89000711
- Added to NRHP: July 06, 1989

The House at 380 Albion Street in Wakefield, Massachusetts is one of the finest Bungalow/Craftsman style houses in the town. It was built c. 1910 in a then-rural part of Wakefield that been annexed from Stoneham in the 1880s. The house was listed on the National Register of Historic Places in 1989.

== Description and history ==
Albion Street is a major local thoroughfare, running southwest from the center of Wakefield to the north side of Stoneham center. Number 380 is set on a parcel under 1 acre (0.40 ha) in size that abuts the present town line at the Green Street intersection. The parcel is fringed on its street-facing sides by a low field-stone retaining wall capped in concrete The house is a single story building with a shallow pitch roof that extend across a wraparound porch supported by Craftsan-style sloping square columns. The gables are decorated with latticework and there are decorated viga-like rafter ends embellishing the area. The building is roughly T-shaped, with three-part picture and casement window combinations at the front of the gable, and of the projecting side section. It has been extended to the rear, with a period garage attached on the right rear.

The Albion Street area was largely farmland in the 19th century, and was part of a large rural tract that Wakefield annexed from Stoneham in 1880. This house does not appear on a 1906 map of the area, which showed some development north of Albion Street. From stylistic evidence, its construction date is estimated to be 1910.

== See also ==
- National Register of Historic Places listings in Wakefield, Massachusetts
- National Register of Historic Places listings in Middlesex County, Massachusetts
