= Reredos of Our Lady of Light =

Historic artwork in New Mexico, United States

- U.S. National Register of Historic Places
- NM State Register of Cultural Properties
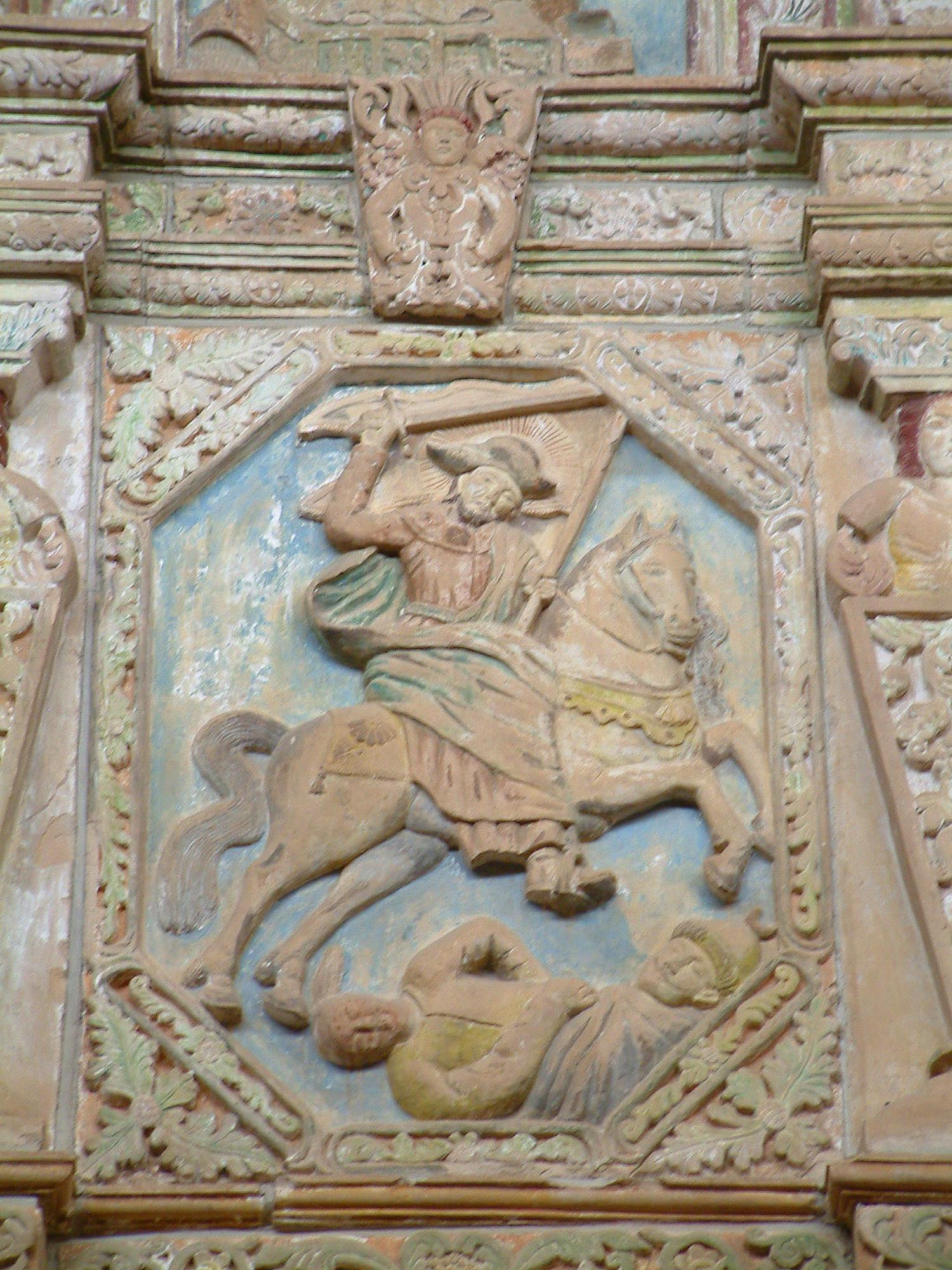
- Detail of the reredos depicting St. James the Apostle

- Location within New Mexico Location within the United States
- Location: Cristo Rey Church, Canyon Rd. and Cristo Rey St., Santa Fe, New Mexico
- Coordinates: 35°40′43″N 105°55′0″W
- Area: 9.9 acres (4.0 ha)
- Built: 1761
- NRHP reference No.: 70000411
- NMSRCP No.: 89

Significant dates
- Added to NRHP: September 4, 1970
- Designated NMSRCP: July 20, 1979

The Reredos of Our Lady of Light is a historic stone reredos carved in 1761 in Santa Fe, New Mexico. It was originally installed in the Chapel of Our Lady of Light on the Plaza and is presently housed in Cristo Rey Church, which was built for that purpose in 1940. Described as "the only one of its kind from the Spanish period in the United States" and "definitely one of the most extraordinary pieces of ecclesiastical art in the country," it was added to the National Register of Historic Places in 1970.

The reredos has been attributed to Bernardo de Miera y Pacheco (1713–1785), a Spanish artist and cartographer who came to Santa Fe in the 1750s.

== Description ==
The reredos is over 25 feet (7.6 m) high and 18 feet (5.5 m) wide. It was carved from soft, white volcanic stone quarried near Pojoaque and was originally painted, though only traces of color remain. Reliefs carved into the stone depict a variety of religious iconography. At the crown of the reredos, God appears above the Mother and child (Our Lady of Valvanera). In the next tier of carvings, St. James the Apostle, the patron saint of Spain, appears in the center as Santiago Matamoros, a warrior on horseback attacking enemy infidels. This depiction held symbolic resonance for the Spanish conquistadores and was consequently widely used in New Mexico and other Spanish colonies. The image of James is flanked by St. Joseph with the infant Jesus on the left and St. John Nepomuk, the protector of the Jesuits, on the right.

The bottom row of carvings depicts St. Ignatius Loyola on the left and St. Francis Solano on the right. In the center is a niche that originally housed an oil painting of Our Lady of Light. When the reredos was moved to Cristo Rey Church in 1940, the stone slab that formerly adorned the front of La Castrense was placed in the niche. This depicts Our Lady of Light holding the infant Jesus while rescuing a human figure from the clutches of Satan. Some of the iconography is unusual in that it depicts Jesuit and Benedictine figures rather than strictly those of the Franciscans, who were responsible for most of the Spanish colonial churches in New Mexico.

== History ==
The Chapel of Our Lady of Light, or La Castrense, was a military chapel on the south side of the Santa Fe Plaza which was built in 1760 by Governor Francisco Antonio Marín del Valle. To complete the interior of the chapel, Marín del Valle brought masons from Zacatecas, Mexico to carve a massive stone reredos. Archaeological investigations of the chapel site found chips of the same stone, suggesting that the carving took place on site. The building of the chapel was observed by Bishop of Durango Pedro Tamarón y Romeral during his visit to New Mexico in 1760; he wrote

In the plaza, a very fine church dedicated to the Most Holy Mother of Light was being built, it is thirty varas [about 80 feet] long and nine [25 feet] wide, with a transept. Eight leagues from there a vein of very white stone had been discovered, and the amount necessary for an altar screen large enough to fill a third [of the wall] of the high altar was brought from this place. This was then carved. Later both it and the church were finished. The dedication of this church was also celebrated, and I was informed that it was all well adorned. The chief founder of this church was the governor himself, Don Francisco Marín del Valle, who simultaneously arranged for the founding of a confraternity which was established while I was there. I attended the first meeting and approved everything.

A later visitor, Fray Atanasio Domínguez, recorded a very detailed description of the chapel in 1776. According to his measurements, La Castrense was about 100 feet (30 m) long overall and 22 feet (6.7 m) wide, extending to 40 feet (12 m) wide at the transept. The ceiling, supported by corbeled beams, was about 26 feet (7.9 m) high with a clerestory above the sanctuary. As to the reredos, he wrote

The altar screen is all of a white stone ... very easy to carve. It consists of three sections. In the center of the first, as if enthroned, is an ordinary oil painting on canvas with a painted frame of Our Lady of Light, which was brought from Mexico at the aforesaid Lord Governor Marín's expense ... On the right side of this image is St. Ignatius of Loyola, and on the left is St. Francis Solano ... All of these images, with the exception of Our Lady of Light, are in medallions of the same stone of which the altar screen is made and carved in half relief, painted as is suitable, and this work resembles a copy of the facades which are now used in famous Mexico.

Ultimately, although highly critical of many of the churches he visited in New Mexico, Domínguez conceded "Its interior is very attractive." The chapel remained in use by Spanish, and later Mexican, troops stationed in Santa Fe until the 1830s. The chapel was last regularly used during the first term of Governor Manuel Armijo (1827−29), who attended services in full uniform along with the military garrison. However, the Mexican government later withdrew its financial support for military chaplains and La Castrense was left empty, eventually falling into disrepair. By the time the U.S. Army occupied the city in 1846, the roof had fallen in and bones were sticking out of the earthen floor. The army repaired the chapel and turned it into a storehouse.

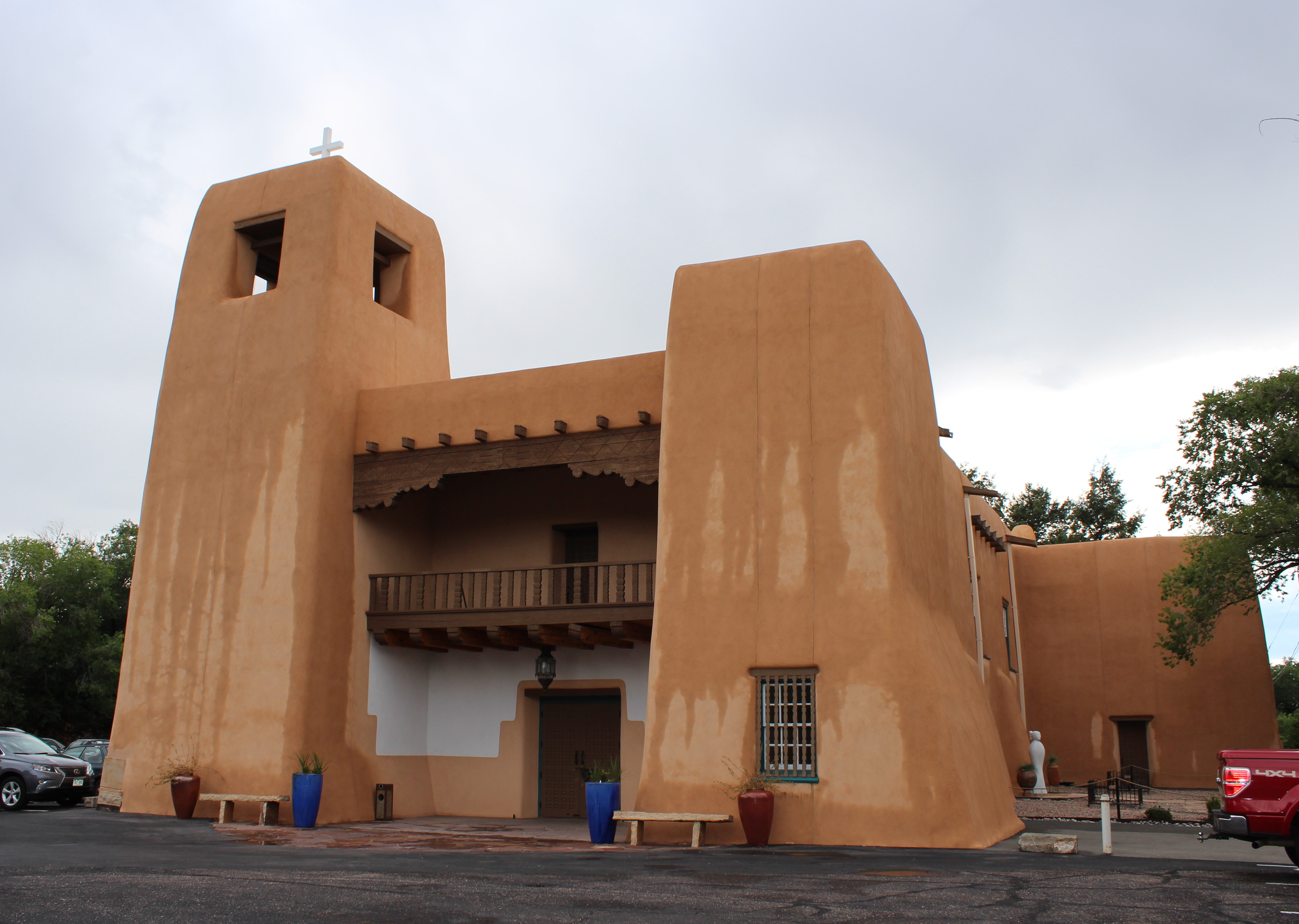
The reredos has been housed in Cristo Rey Church since 1940

When Jean-Baptiste Lamy arrived in Santa Fe as its new Vicar Apostolic in 1851, one of his first tasks was to take control of La Castrense and other property that he saw as rightfully belonging to the church. The Territorial Legislature had vowed not to interfere but Grafton Baker, the Chief Justice of the New Mexico Supreme Court, was opposed to handing over the chapel and drunkenly declared that he would hang Lamy if he tried to take it. This created an uproar in the heavily Catholic city and Baker, fearing for his own safety, was forced to back down. Lamy tried for a few years to revive the chapel, but without much success, and ended up selling it in 1859 to raise money for his new cathedral project. The building was converted into a store and remained standing at least until the 1870s, though it was later demolished. When the site was cleared for a new building in 1955, the foundations of La Castrense were uncovered and studied by archaeologists.

Before disposing of the chapel, Lamy had the reredos and a stone medallion from the facade removed and transferred to La Parroquia, the main parish church of Santa Fe at the time. Later this church was replaced by St. Francis Cathedral. Once the cathedral was completed, the reredos was consigned to a small room behind the altar away from public view. In 1940, it was moved to the new Cristo Rey parish church on Canyon Road, which was built specifically to house it, and has remained there since. The church was designed by noted New Mexico architect John Gaw Meem.

== See also ==
- National Register of Historic Places listings in Santa Fe County, New Mexico
