= Bud Holman =

American Expressionist Landscape Painter

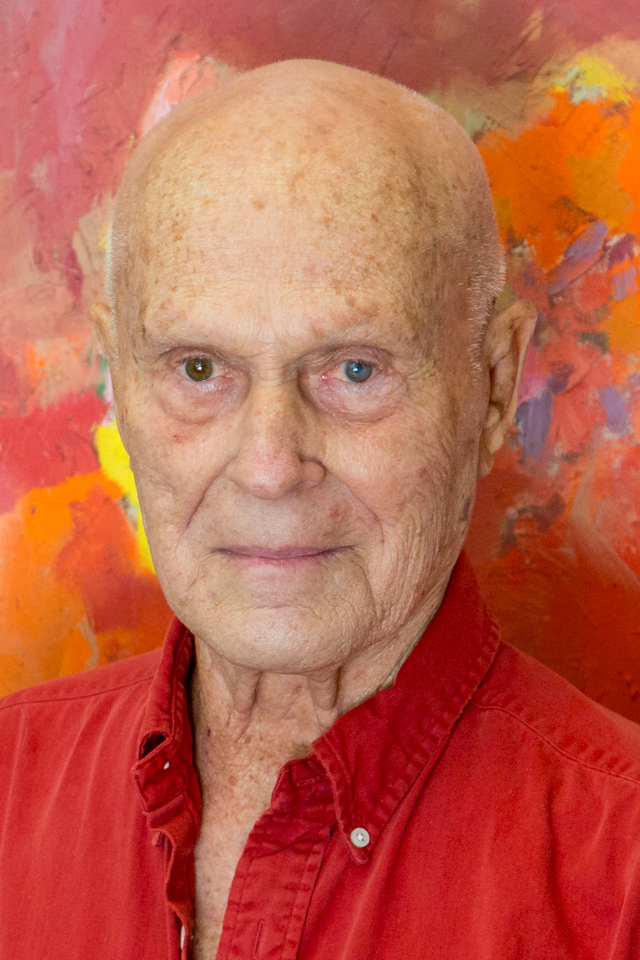
- Holman in 2016
- Born: Charles Edward Holman II; July 30, 1926; Topeka, Kansas, U.S.
- Died: June 27, 2023 (aged 96); Nogales, Arizona, U.S.
- Known for: Painting, sculpture
- Website: Catalogue Raisonné

Signature
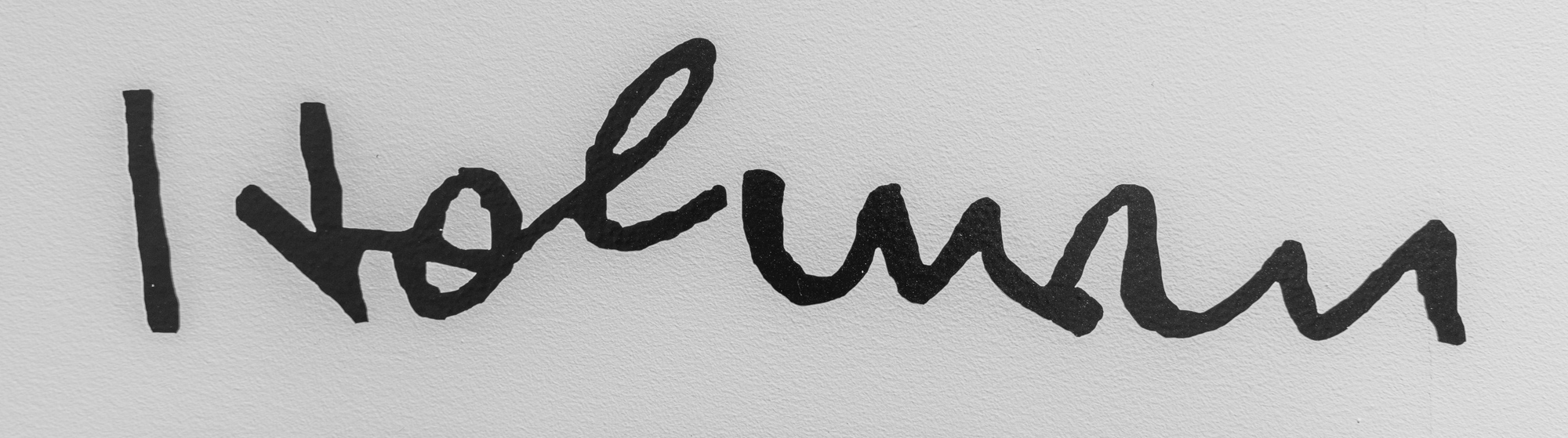

Charles Edward "Bud" Holman II (July 30, 1926 – May 27, 2023) was an American painter and sculptor.

== Early life and education ==
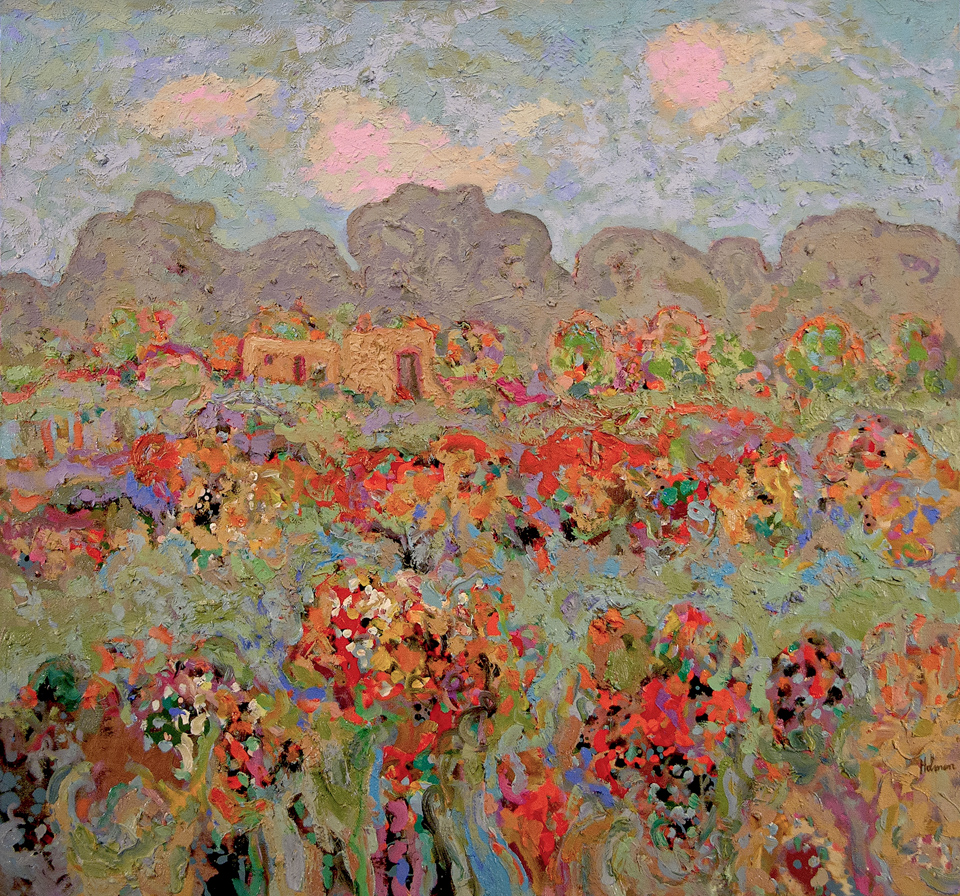
The Adobe - New Mexican Landscape, 1974-1975

Born July 30, 1926 in Topeka, Kansas, Holman graduated from Stanford University in 1950, with a BA and MA in Art History and Archeology.

== Career ==
In 1975 Holman purchased a home on Canyon Road, in Santa Fe, New Mexico which he renovated. The following year he held a four person show there that included his work, entitled Four Mystery Painters. In 1980 he exhibited in a show of Southwestern art at the Whitney Gallery in Taos.

In 2014, an exhibition of Holman's early drawings from 1948-1950 were shown at the Morris Gallery/NOTO Arts Center in Topeka, Kansas; the drawings were then donated to the Topeka and Shawnee County Public Library. Several of these sketches were used in the 1950's for the Shawnee County Historical Society covers.

In 2016, the Mulvane Art Museum at Washburn University in Topeka, Kansas hosted a retrospective show. The style of the work in the show was described as "abstracted landscape." The museum published a 52-page catalogue in conjunction with the exhibition.

In 2021, Holman exhibited in the Hamptons Fine Art Fair in South Hampton, New York where some of his Sagaponack series were shown.

=== Collections ===
The Spencer Museum of Art at the University of Kansas acquired two large paintings in 1961. In the 1970's the New Mexico Museum of Art acquired three of Holman's works. In the 1980's the Tucson Museum of Art acquired four of Holman's paintings. The Mulvane Art Museum at Washburn University, Kansas, acquired five paintings.
