= Turner Carroll Gallery =

Coordinates: 35°40′50.8″N 105°55′30.6″W

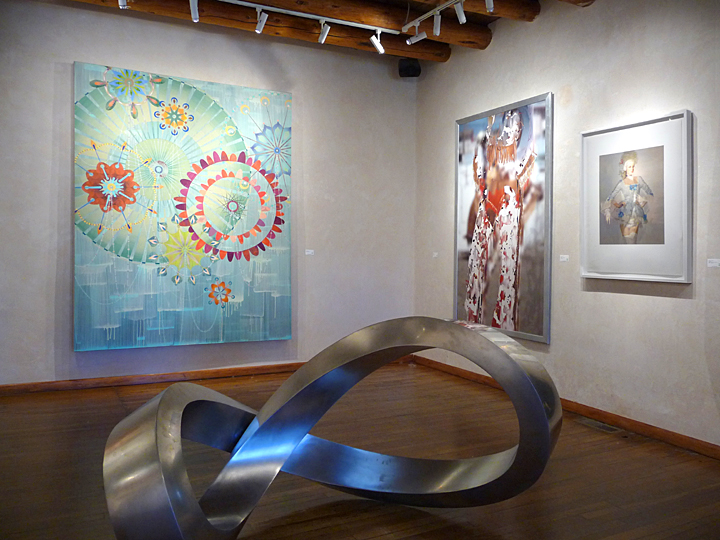
Works by Rex Ray, Deborah Oropallo, and more at Turner Carroll Gallery.

Turner Carroll Gallery is a fine art gallery on Canyon Road, Santa Fe, New Mexico, established in 1991 and owned and operated by Michael Carroll and Tonya Turner Carroll. The couple's cumulative experience includes Sotheby's London, the Philadelphia Museum of Art, the Israel Museum, and art studies in Russia and Italy.

The gallery represents contemporary art from diverse areas of the world. To date, the gallery has featured exhibitions and artists from Romania, Ireland, France, Russia, Mexico, Korea, China, and Japa.

The gallery has featured artists who have works in the Whitney Museum of American Art, The Museum of Modern Art, The Metropolitan Museum of Art, the San Francisco Museum of Modern Art, the Berkeley Art Museum, the Belvedere Museum in Vienna, the Russian State Museum, and the Dallas Museum of Art.

== Notable shows, fundraising, and expansion ==
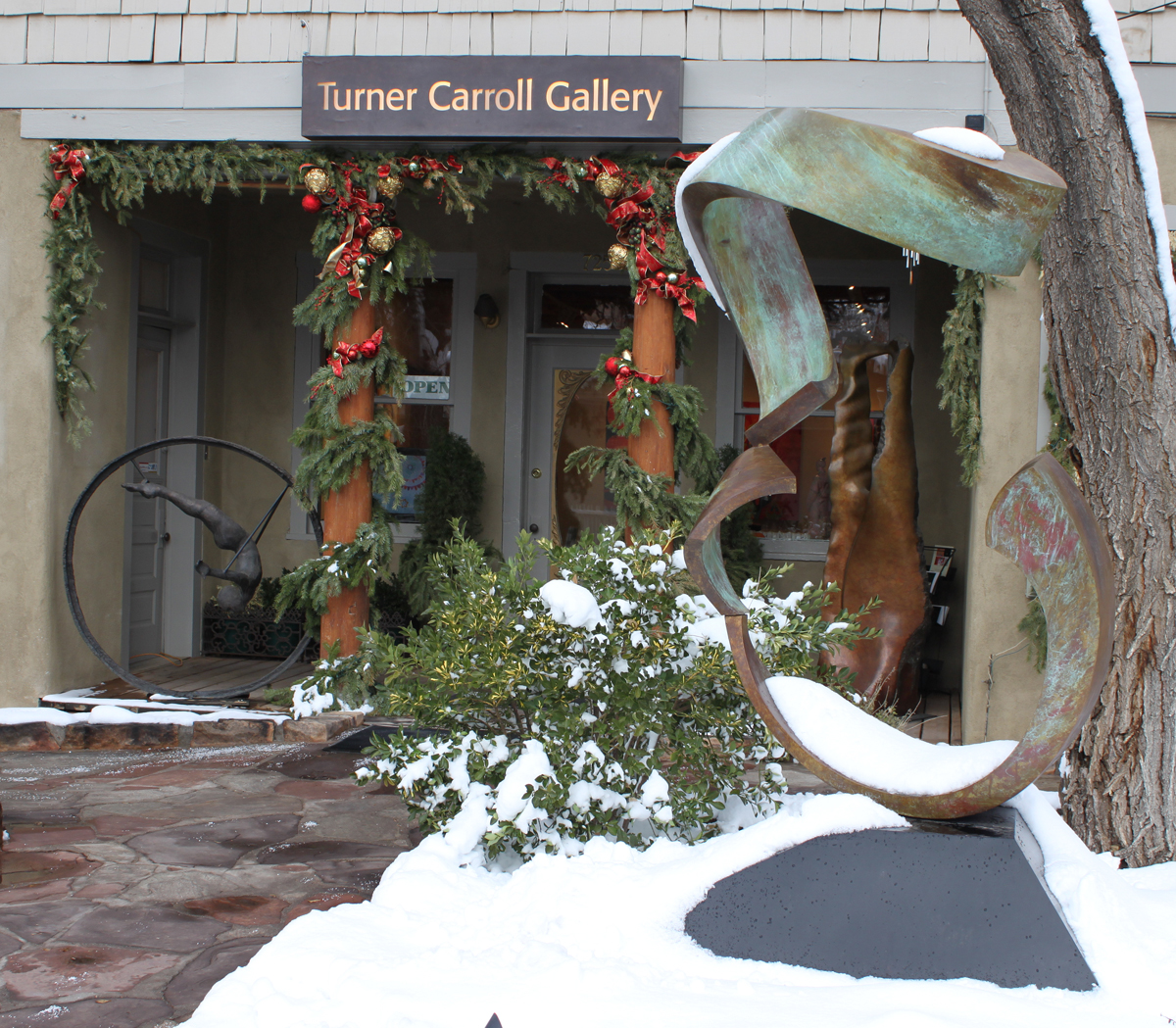
Turner Carroll Gallery, Santa Fe, New Mexico.

Owner Michael Carroll is president of the Santa Fe Gallery Association, which serves to publicize the Santa Fe art market to a larger audience outside of the state and to broaden the public conception of Santa Fe art. The gallery is also involved in fundraising for arts education through the Art Smart charity arm of the Santa Fe Gallery Association.

In 2008, Turner Carroll exhibited the work of Wanxin Zhang, Hung Liu, Yoshiko Shimano, and Youngmi Song in a show entitled New Gallery Artists to Watch - Asia.

In 2011 the gallery announced the opening of a project space in Dallas, Texas. After Hotel ZaZa owner Charles S. Givens met representatives from Turner Carroll Gallery at Art Basel Miami Beach, Hotel ZaZa Dallas opened Stay ZaZa Art House & Social Gallery in January 2011. Stay ZaZa is an art and events space where Turner Carroll Gallery will curate shows of nationally and internationally recognized artists.

The inaugural show at Stay ZaZa featured the work of Ashley Collins and ten percent of the proceeds of its sales were donated to America SCORES Dallas, a charity organization serving local elementary students.

The second show featured painter Hung Liu, whose first job in the arts since emigrating from China was at the University of Texas; the Dallas Museum of Art was also the first American museum to acquire one of Liu's paintings for its permanent collection. "The art historical significance of Hung's work has been internationally proclaimed, but it was in Texas that she got her start in the American art world," notes Tonya Turner Carroll.

The third show, "Wet," included works by painters Eric Zener and Conrad Kern as well as sculptures by Gino Miles involving the theme of water.

Turner Carroll Gallery also administrates ArteMita, a project dedicated to Mexican contemporary art in Punta Mita, Mexico. Events and exhibitions put on by ArteMita often include a charity aspect. In September 2010, ArteMita held an art workshop by Mexican contemporary artist Fernando Diaz to raise money for Costa Verde International School in Sayulita, Mexico. In March 2011, ArteMita hosted an exhibition of paintings by Magdiel Perez in which ten percent of the proceeds of sales were donated to CVIS.

In 2012, Turner Carroll Gallery will help curate an exhibition of Igor Melnikov works at the Russian State Museum.

== Artists ==
The following is a partial list of artists represented by Turner Carroll Gallery:

- Jeremy Biggers
- Calyxte Campe
- Steven Cozart
- Jim Dine
- Stephen Hayes
- Clarence Heyward
- Etsuko Ichikawa
- Hung Liu
- Monica Lundy
- Agnes Martin
- Igor Melnikov
- Virgil Ortiz
- Rusty Scruby
- Hunt Slonem
- Swoon (artist)
- Nadya Tolokonnikova
- Lien Truong
- Karen Yank
