= Cristo Rey Church =

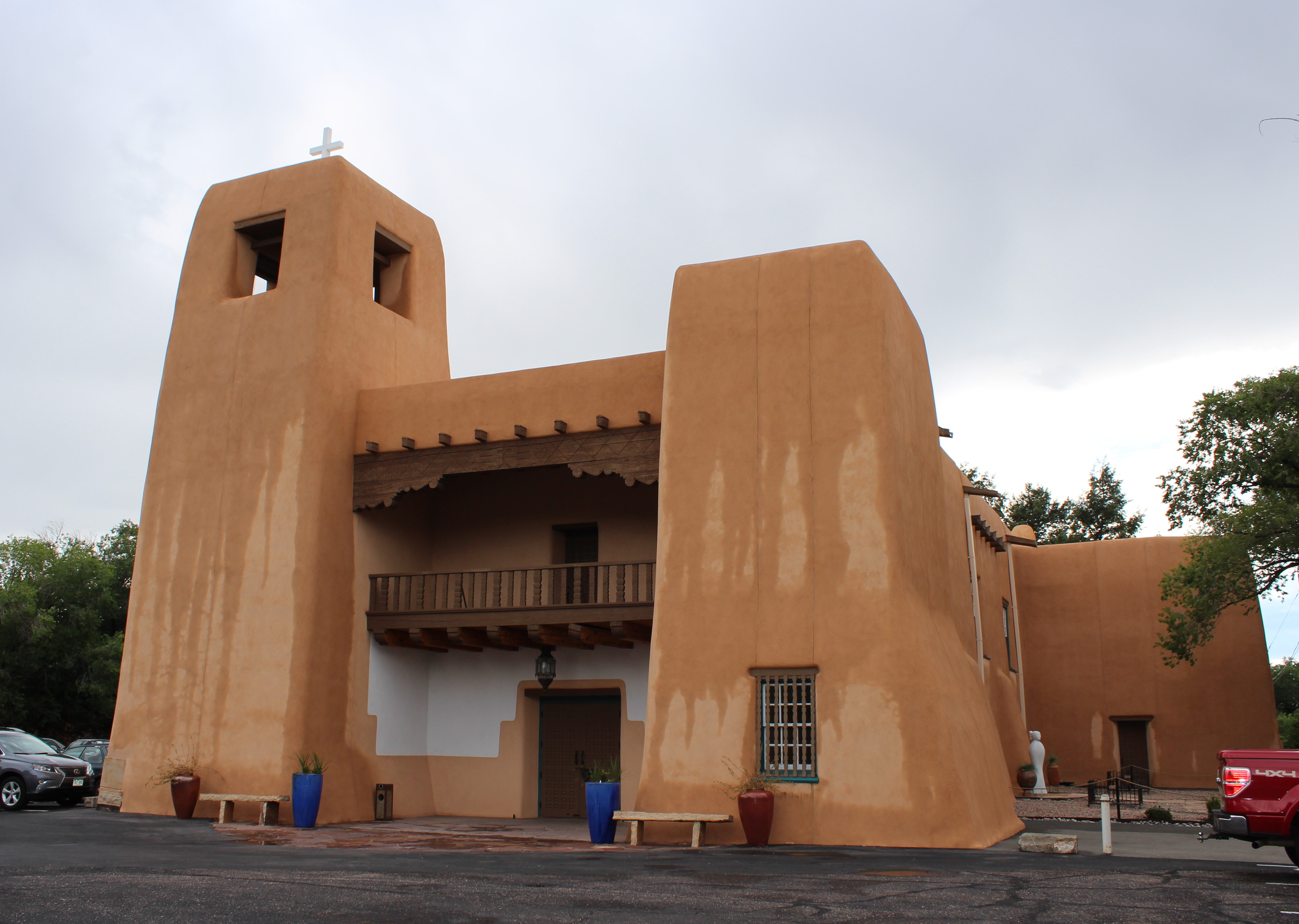
- The church in 2015
- Cristo Rey Church
- 35°40′44″N 105°55′02″W
- Location: 1120 Canyon Rd., Santa Fe, New Mexico
- Country: United States
- Denomination: Roman Catholic
- Website: cristoreyparish.org

History
- Status: Parish church
- Founded: 1940

Architecture
- Functional status: Active
- Architect: John Gaw Meem
- Style: Pueblo Revival
- Groundbreaking: 1939
- Completed: 1940

Administration
- Archdiocese: Santa Fe

Cristo Rey Church (transl. Christ the King) is a Roman Catholic parish church on Canyon Road in Santa Fe, New Mexico. It is one of the most notable buildings designed by influential Santa Fe architect John Gaw Meem and is claimed by some sources to be the largest adobe building in the United States. It is also notable for its historic altar screen, the Reredos of Our Lady of Light, which is listed on the National Register of Historic Places. The reredos was carved in 1761 and originally hung in La Castrense, a military chapel on the Santa Fe Plaza. It has been described as "one of the most extraordinary pieces of ecclesiastical art in the country". The church was dedicated in 1940.

== History ==
The church was commissioned by Archbishop of Santa Fe Rudolph Gerken in 1939 and completed in 1940. The project served three purposes: to provide a new parish church on Santa Fe's east side, to commemorate the 400th anniversary of Francisco Vázquez de Coronado's expedition to New Mexico, and to provide a permanent home for the Reredos of Our Lady of Light. The stone reredos was carved in 1761 and was originally installed in the Chapel of Our Lady of Light, also known as La Castrense, on the Santa Fe Plaza. More recently, it had been stored for decades under less than ideal circumstances in a rarely visited room of St. Francis Cathedral. The new church allowed it to be returned to full public display for the first time since 1859.

The church was one of the most ambitious adobe buildings ever undertaken in New Mexico, requiring 150,000–200,000 individual adobes. Around 120 laborers worked onsite to manufacture and lay the adobes and cut logs and branches into vigas and latillas. A total of 222 large logs were required for the ceiling. The church was dedicated on June 27, 1940.

== Architecture ==
Cristo Rey Church was designed by John Gaw Meem in the Pueblo Revival style, drawing inspiration from New Mexico's historic Spanish missions. In particular, the design borrows elements from San Estevan Del Rey Mission Church at Acoma Pueblo and San José de Gracia Church in Las Trampas. Like its antecedents, the church is built from adobe, though it is supported by a hidden steel frame rather than relying completely on traditional building techniques. The building is massive in scale, 125 feet (38 m) long, 40 feet (12 m) wide, and 33 feet (10 m) high, and the adobe walls are up to 9 feet (2.7 m) thick in places. Architecture critic Chris Wilson described the building as "the last, great adobe mission".

The facade is asymmetrical, with two battered towers of different heights separated by a recessed balcony above the main entrance. Inside, the church follows a traditional Latin cross plan with an aisleless nave, transept, and polygonal apse. The ceiling is supported on massive, corbeled vigas in the traditional manner, and there is a clerestory above the altar to illuminate the Reredos of Our Lady of Light which is installed at the west end. The pews, confessionals, and doors are all wooden and were made by students at the Lourdes trade school in Albuquerque.

== See also ==
- List of churches in the Roman Catholic Archdiocese of Santa Fe
