= Viga (architecture) =

Architectural wood-beamed roof beams

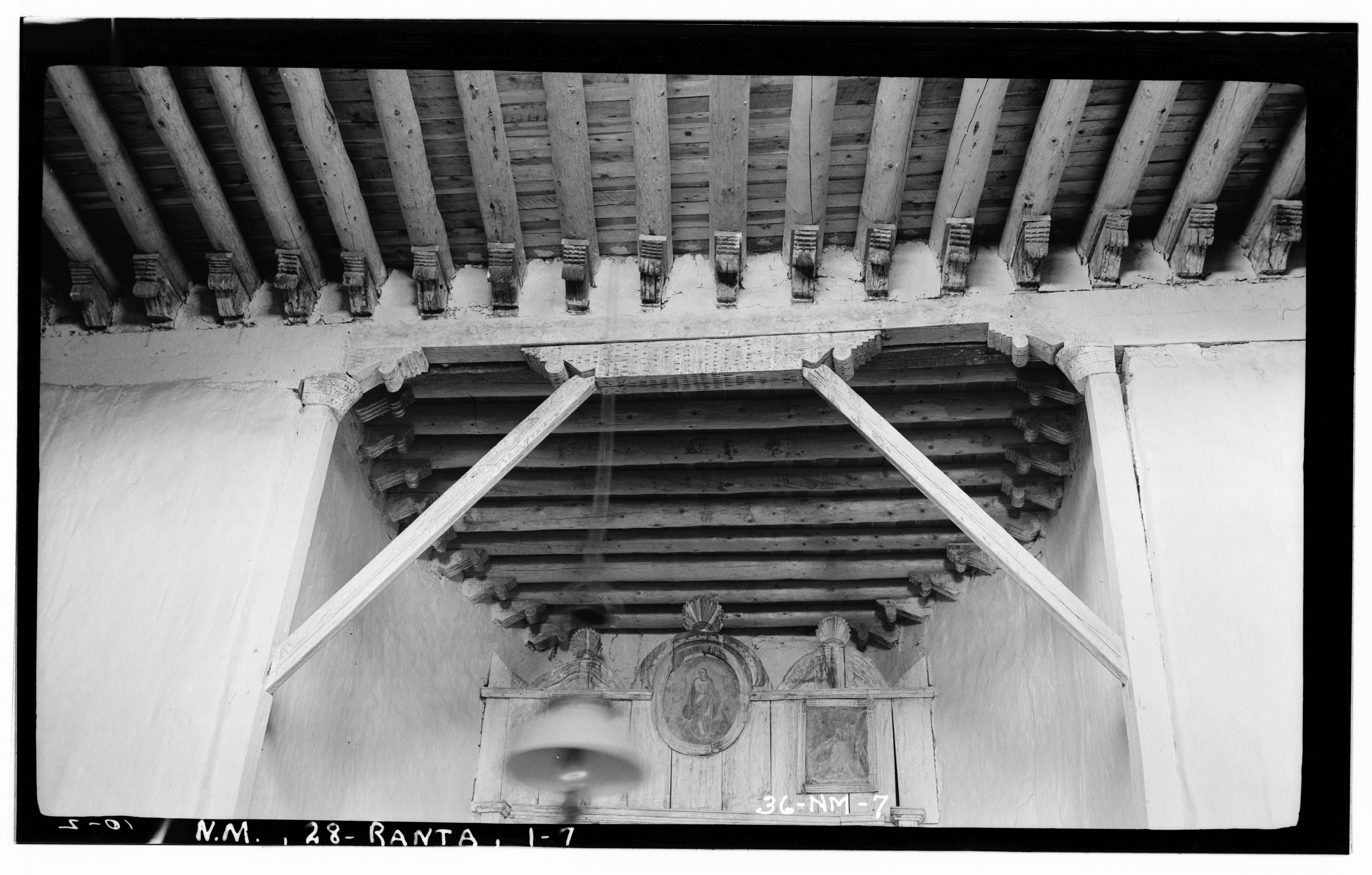
Vigas and latillas in the ceiling of San Francisco de Asis Mission Church, Ranchos de Taos, New Mexico

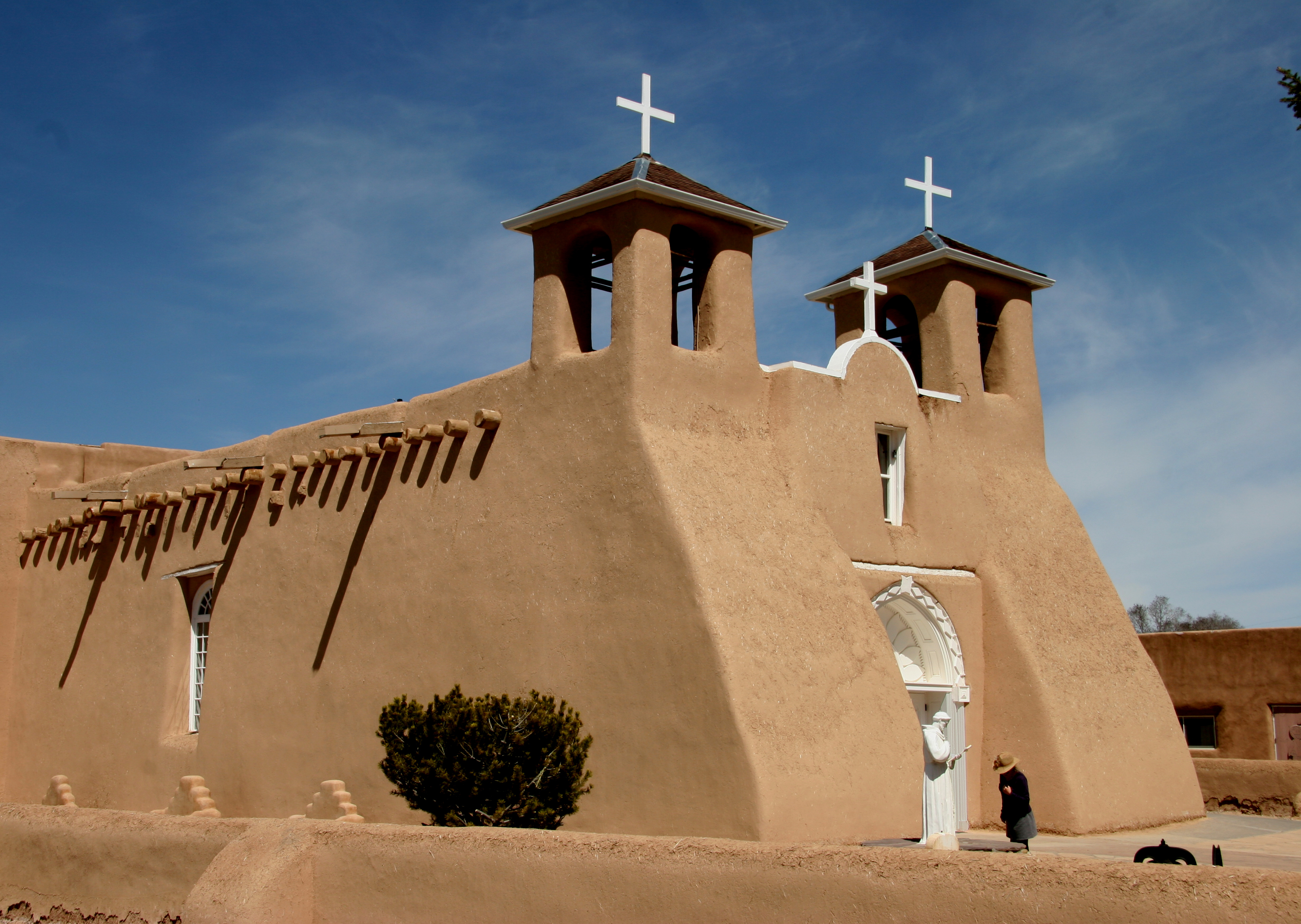
The exterior of the same building showing the projecting vigas

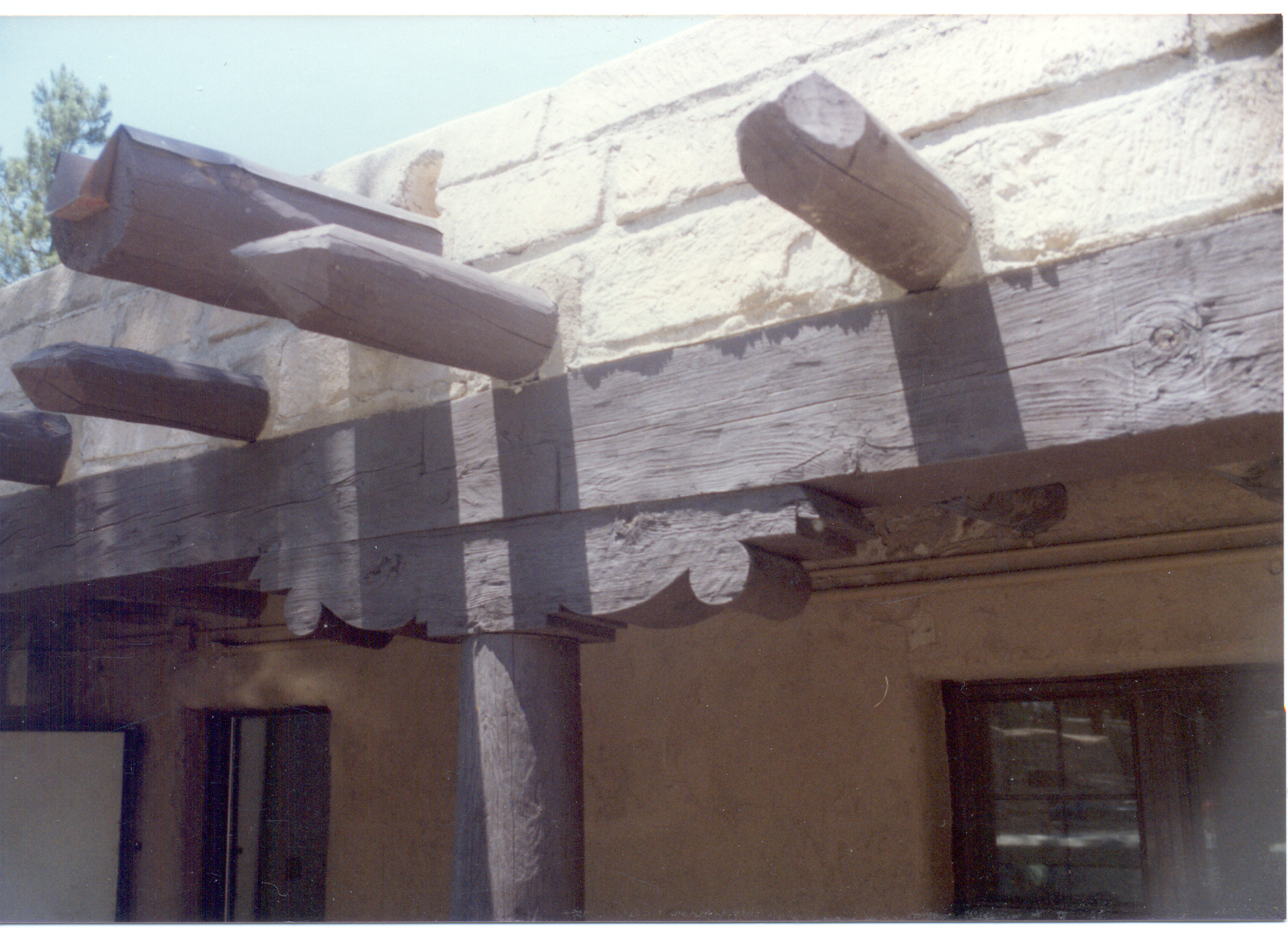
Bandelier National Monument Headquarters, originally the Park Lodge Dining room and snack-bar building, built by the Civilian Conservation Corps

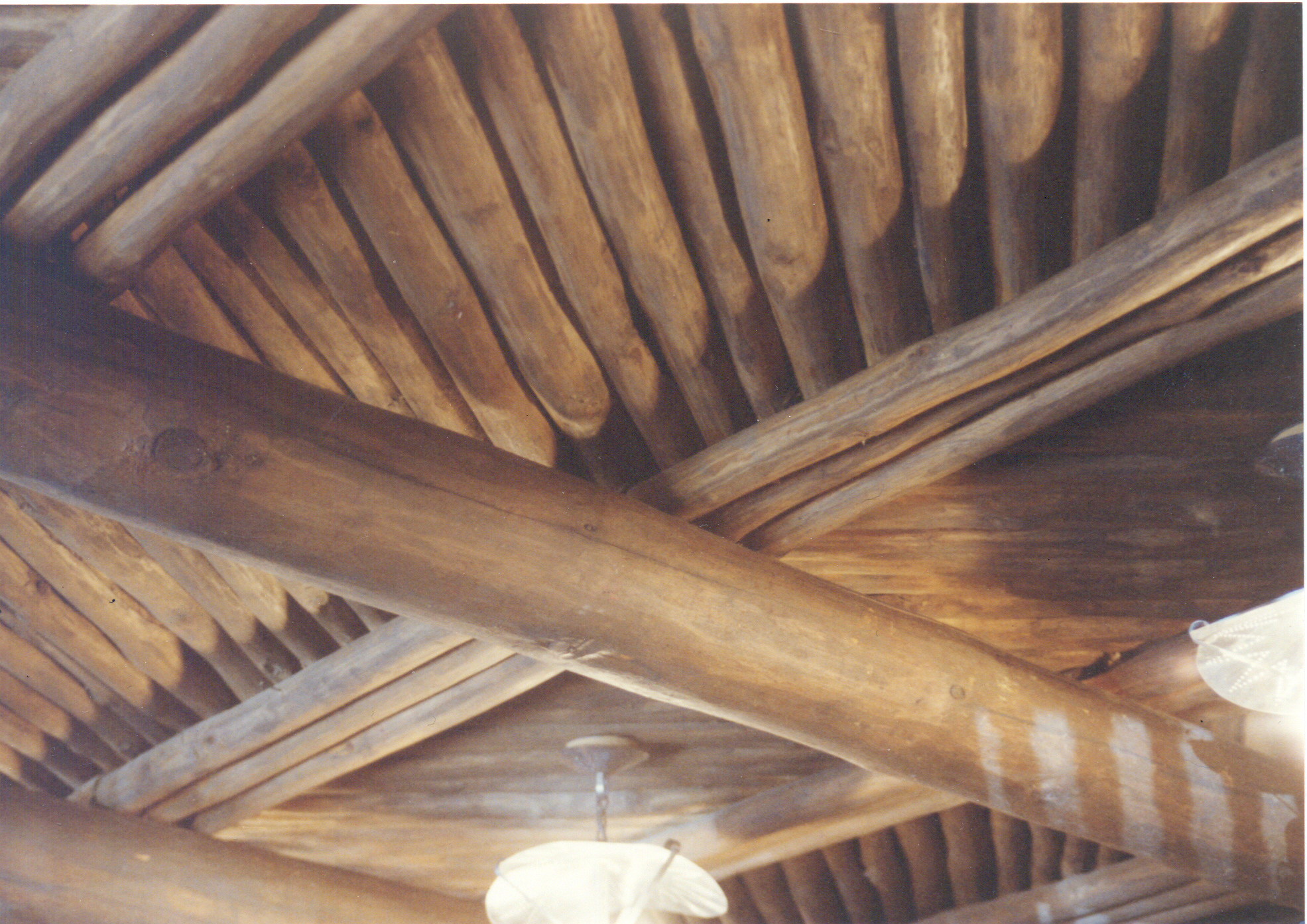
Latillas in a viga roof

Vigas are wooden beams used in the traditional adobe architecture of the American Southwest, especially in New Mexico. In this type of construction, the vigas are the main structural members carrying the weight of the roof to the load-bearing exterior walls. The exposed beam-ends projecting from the outside of the wall are a defining characteristic of Pueblo architecture and of Spanish Colonial architecture in New Mexico, often replicated in modern Pueblo Revival architecture. Usually the vigas are simply peeled logs with a minimum of woodworking. In traditional buildings, the vigas support latillas (laths) which are placed crosswise and upon which the adobe roof is laid, often with intermediate layers of brush or soil. The latillas may be hewn boards, or - in more rustic buildings - simply peeled branches. These building techniques date back to the Ancestral Puebloan peoples of 750 to 1300 CE, and vigas (or holes left where the vigas have deteriorated) are visible in many of their surviving buildings.

Since the popularization of the modern Pueblo Revival style in the 1920s and 1930s, vigas are typically used for ornamental rather than structural purposes. Noted Santa Fe architect John Gaw Meem (1894-1983) incorporated ornamental vigas into many of his designs. Contemporary construction in Santa Fe, New Mexico, which is controlled by stringent building-codes, typically incorporates ornamental vigas, although the 2012 revision of the residential building-code gives credit for structural vigas. Older structures that have been reconstructed (e.g. the Palace of the Governors in Santa Fe) may contain both structural and ornamental vigas.

== Etymology ==
The word viga is Spanish for "beam", "rafter" or "girder".

== Composition ==
Vigas are typically about 6 to 10 inches (15.24 to 25.4 cm) in diameter and average 15 feet (4.6 m) long. Pinyon (Pinus edulis) and Ponderosa Pine were the most common wood species used for vigas during the 17th century. Engelmann spruce is preferred because of "wood character and lack of cracking," but Ponderosa pine (Pinus ponderosa) is more commonly used. Because the availability of vigas longer than 15 feet is limited by the size of the trees cut for the purpose, traditional viga-constructed rooms are typically less than 15 feet (4.6 m) wide. A layer of smaller branches or saplings known as latillas or latias (laths) is laid over the top of the vigas, and then a slightly sloped layer of adobe is added on top of the latillas for insulation and drainage.

Although vigas were sometimes salvaged from old buildings to erect new ones, such as in Walpi, this practice depended on the condition of the site and the material salvaged. The use of traditional rounded vigas changed with the arrival of the railroad in the 1880s, which brought dimensioned lumber, and immigrants who used different construction methods, from the east coast.

== Materials ==
Cutting trees for vigas was usually done in winter because of the good temperatures. "Dead and down" trees were the preferred source for vigas in the adjacent forests. Traditional vigas were usually cut to length with metal axes. Latillas were also collected, along with other construction materials at the same time. To make transportation easier, wood preparation usually was done before shipment. Large labor crews were involved, and vigas were transported from the mountains by teams of oxen. Some construction historians have mentioned the use of latillas under the vigas for carrying poles.

Wood cutting was an important aspect of material production. If cutting was done shorter than needed, the builders had to wait until one year later to get the same material, thus representing a problem. These issues led to some structural and designing decisions in constructions, such as the building of second walls inside the proposed building so shorter materials could be used.

Large diameter vigas were cut first so that they can dry or cure for a longer period. As lighter elements for transportation, latillas or latias were cut last from various wood types. These were then sorted and laid out in different patterns from the vigas and painted in a different colors. The 1846 American immigration brought notions of New England architecture. New technologies substituted the use of vigas for machine-sawn beams, among other construction techniques that followed to the 20th century. This practice did not interfere with the use of vigas for mostly decorative purposes in the Pueblo Revival Style architecture between the 1920s and 1930s.

== Structural assembly ==
Traditional vigas were mostly used for structural purposes in buildings. Vigas were often spaced 3 feet (0.91 m) apart, although irregular or unequal spaced was characteristic of Spanish colonial architecture. Buildings using viga roof construction vary from large institutional buildings to small ones. The amount of vigas used for a room vary, but six was the standard. Some rooms in Acoma are roofed with five to nine vigas. Also, other structural practices were added to later buildings, such as placing horizontal bond beams to transfer structural loads to the adobe roof.

The extension of vigas some feet outside of the wall is a standard practice. This was used for the creation of portales or covered porches. An umbral or lintel was added for support of the viga along with vertical posts in these spaces. The porch's roof treatment was the same as in the interior room, but the space provided was used for different purposes.

Vigas were usually installed with the smaller ends to one side of the roof to facilitate good drainage. Vigas usually sat directly on the adobe or stone walls and were strapped. Decorative corbels were used in the portales and in the interiors.

New technologies, especially in Pueblo Revival Architecture, were integrated. The practice of anchoring vigas with rebar through pre-drilled holes at opposing angles and the designing of parapets for anchoring, was ideal for vigas in low flat roofs. This was used to prevent roof uplift.

The vaulted viga roof is another type of structural system using vigas, using parapets on the two side and eaves on the ends. The roof is left exposed on the interior and latillas are placed parallel with others in a diagonal pattern.

== Examples ==
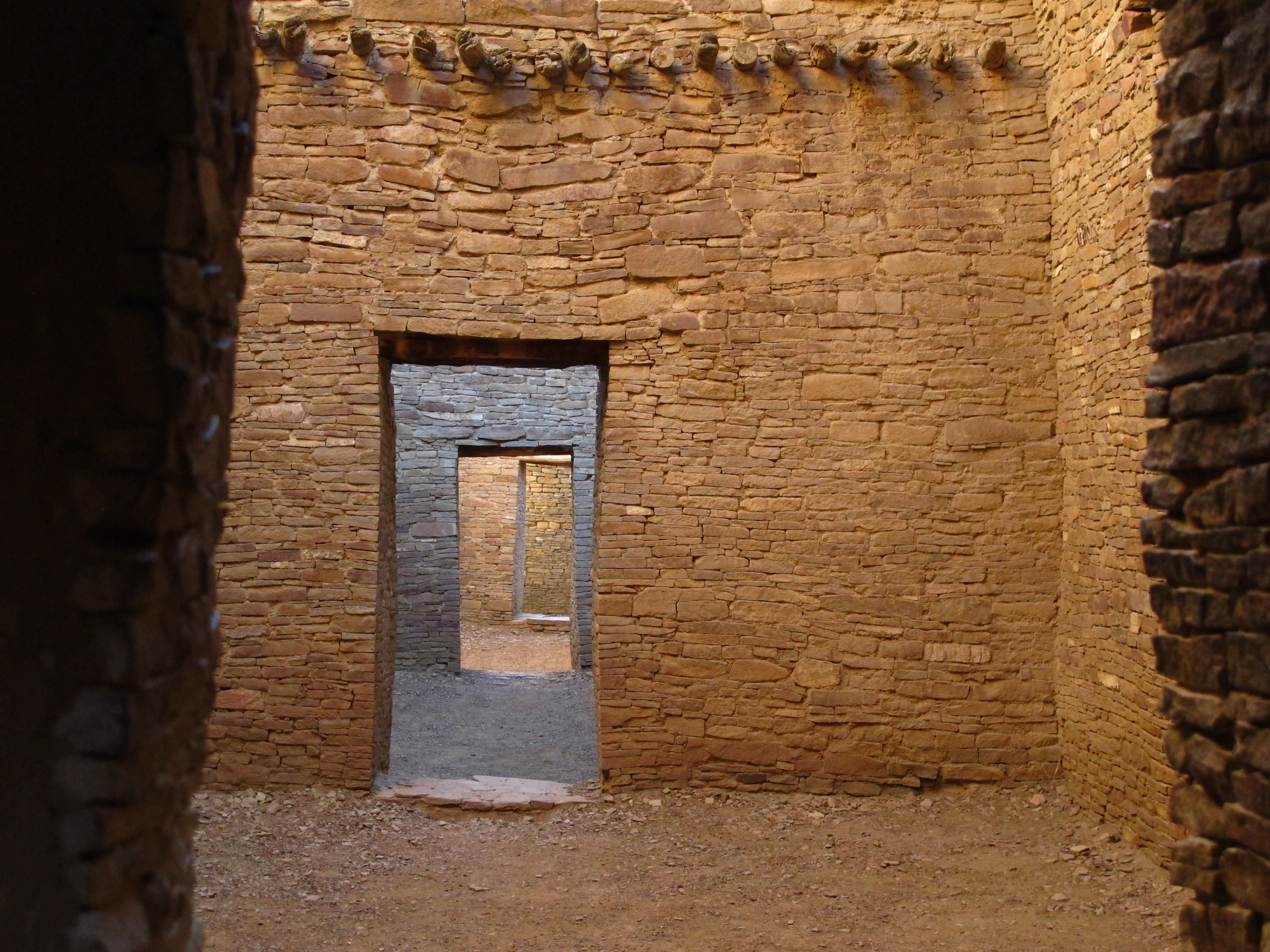
Pueblo Bonito, constructed by Ancestral Puebloan people between 850 and 1150 CE

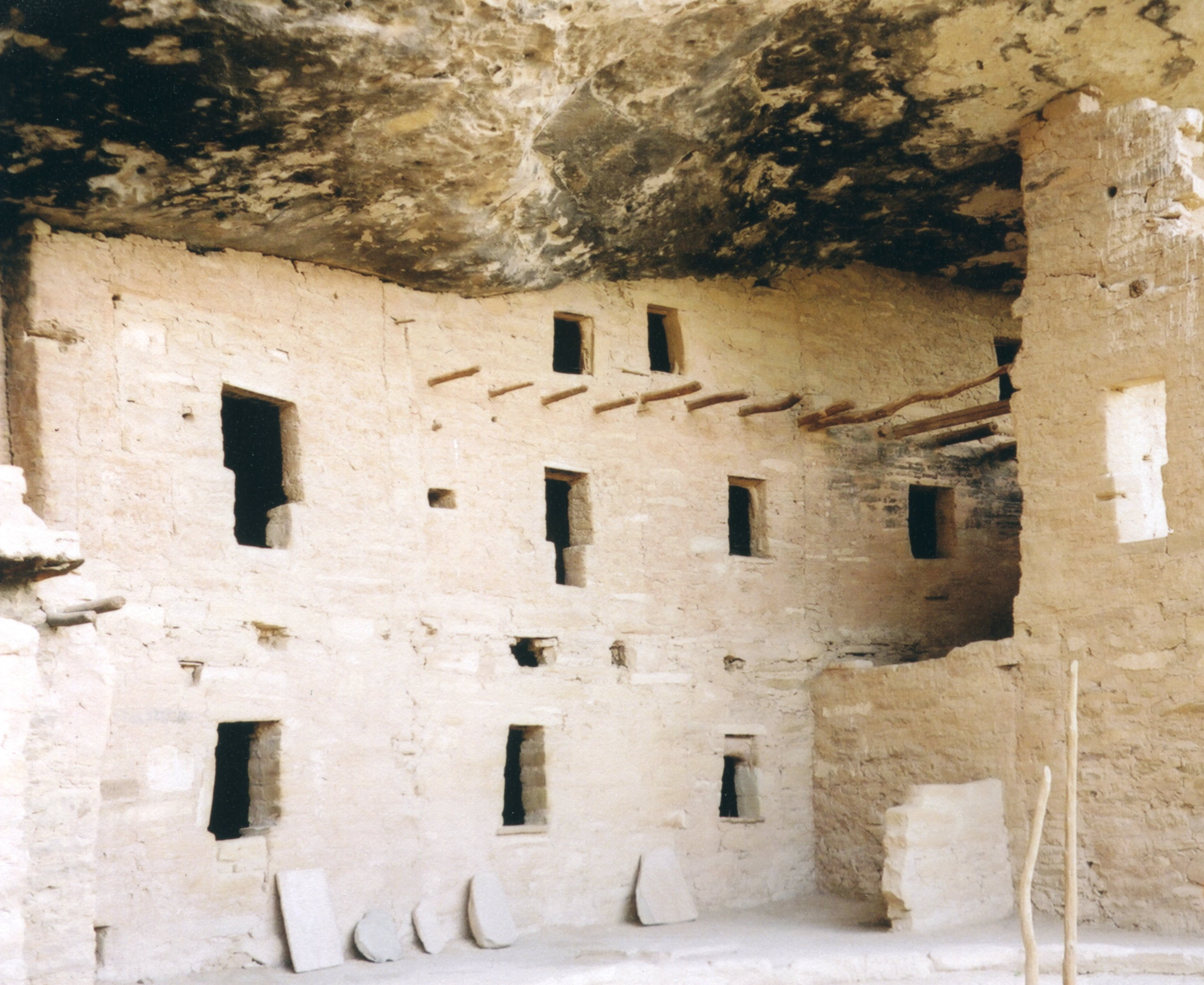
Spruce Tree House, Mesa Verde National Park

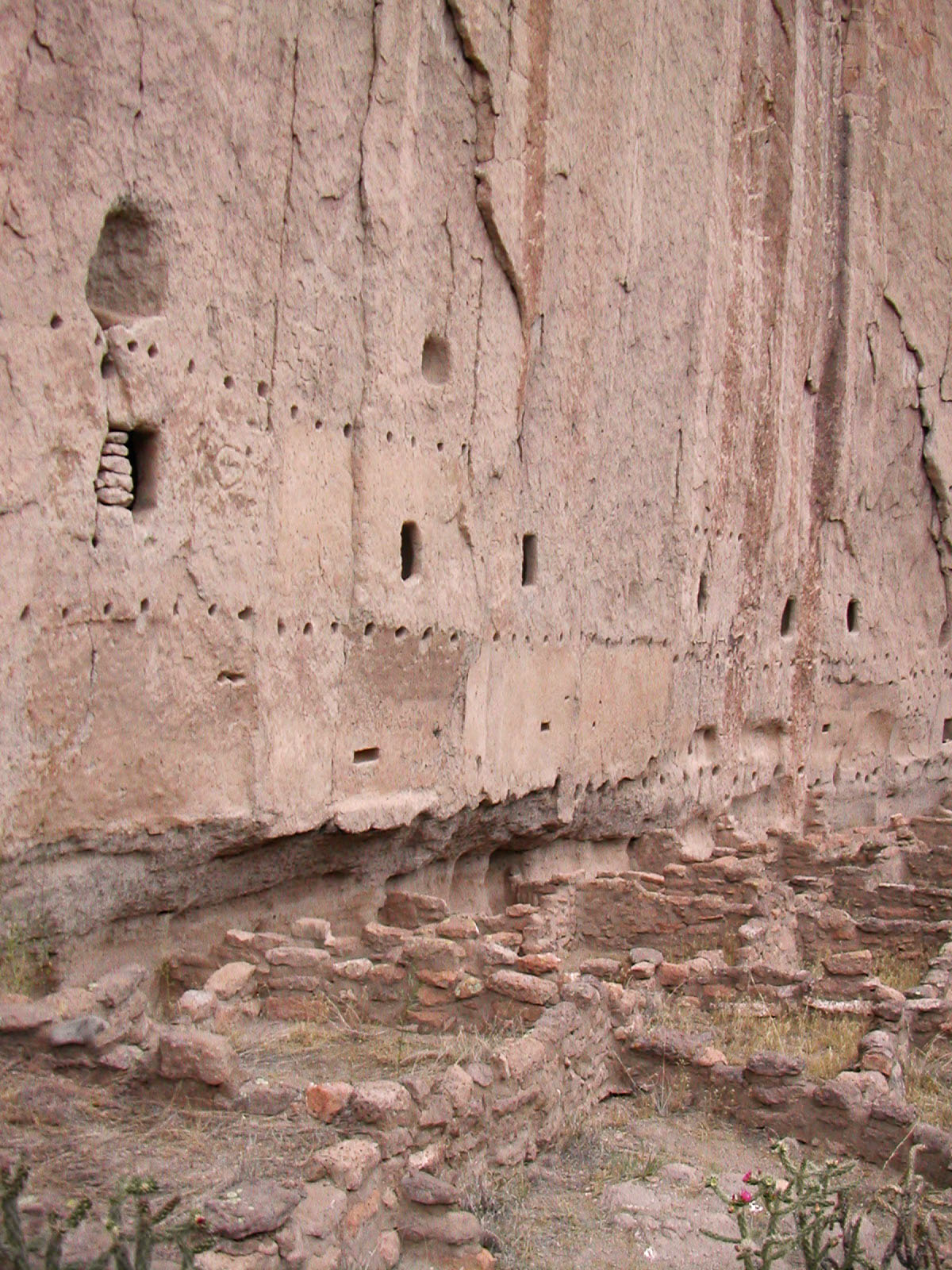
Viga holes in cliff dwellings at Bandelier National Monument

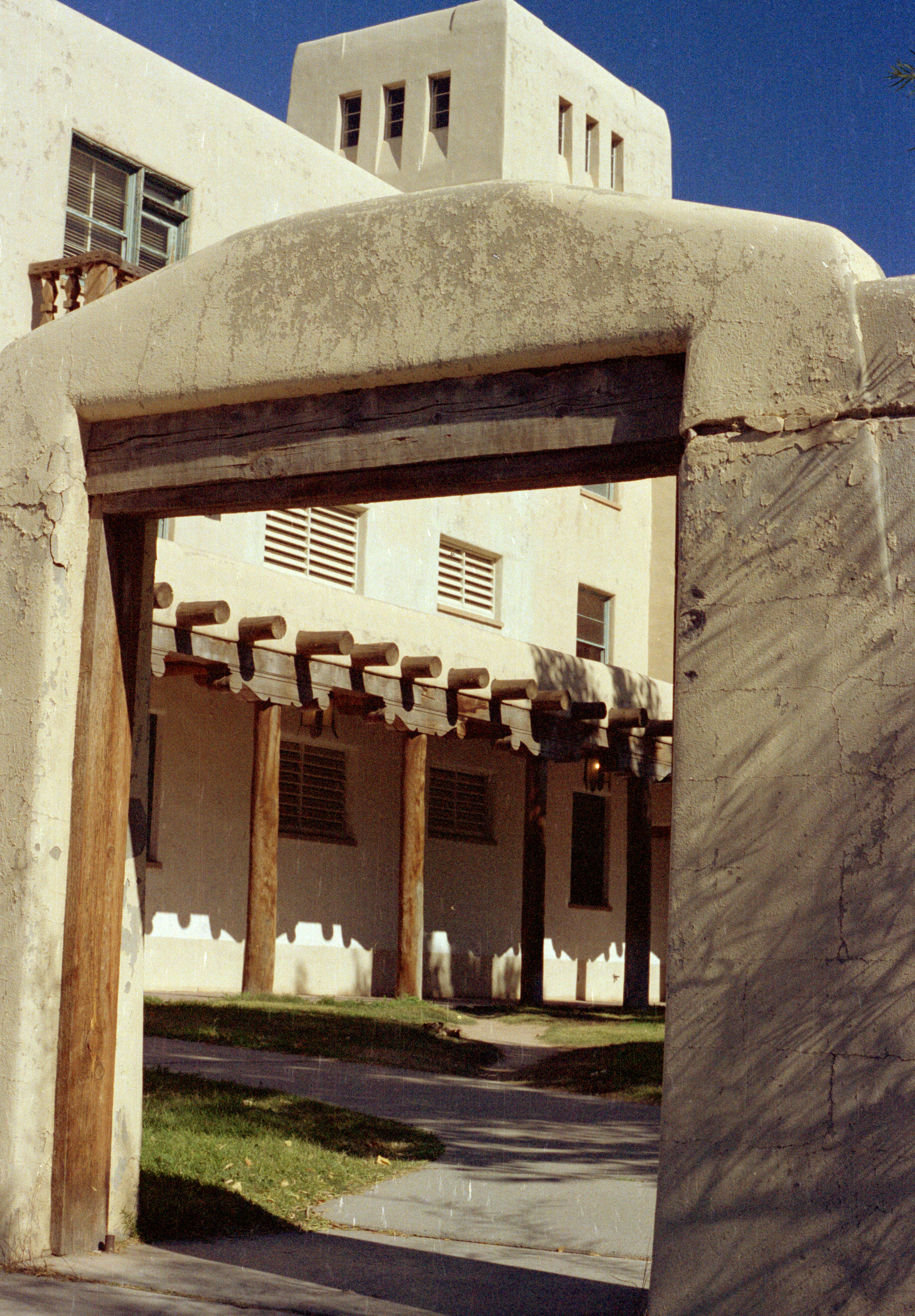
Mesa Vista Hall (1950), University of New Mexico, a modern building with vigas used as ornamentation

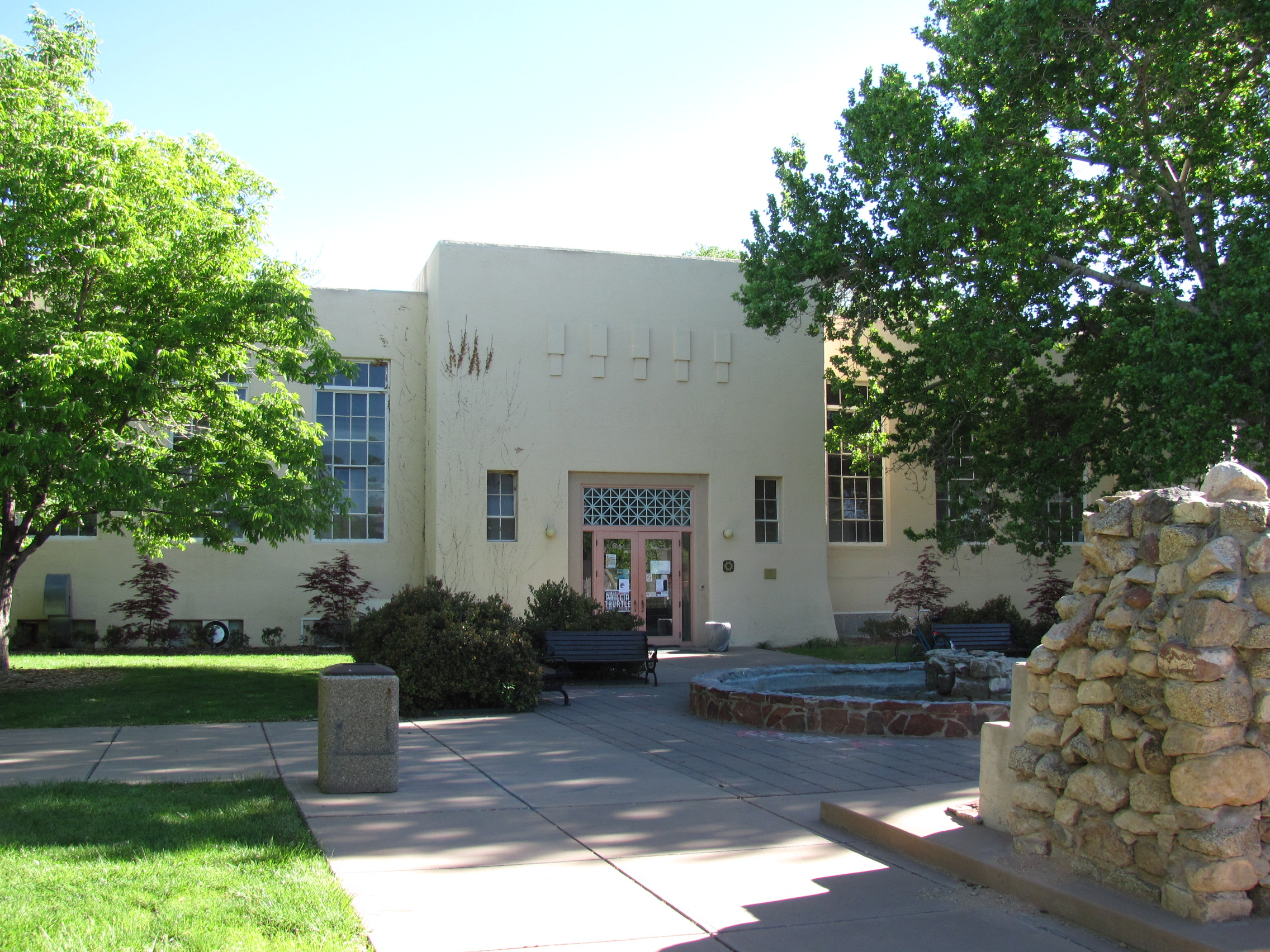
The Art Annex (1926) at UNM, a more abstract Pueblo style building, evokes vigas using stylized ornamentation

== Featured buildings ==
- Acoma Pueblo
- San Esteban del Rey Mission
- Pueblo del Arroyo
- Palace of the Governors
- Taos Pueblo
- Mission Nuestra Señora de los Ángeles de Porciúncula de los Pecos
- Pueblo Bonito
- La Fonda on the Plaza
- Taylor Memorial Chapel
- Cristo Rey Church
- New Mexico Museum of Art
- Painted Desert Inn
- Cabot's Pueblo Museum
- Hodgin Hall
- Estufa
- Chaco Culture National Historical Park
- Salinas Pueblo Missions National Monument
- Santa Clara Pueblo, New Mexico
- Mission Nuestra Señora de la Asunción de Zia
- Kewa Pueblo, New Mexico

== See also ==
- Adobe roof
- Putlog hole
