= Canyon Road, Santa Fe, New Mexico =

Art district in Santa Fe, New Mexico

Coordinates: 35°40′53″N 105°55′40″W

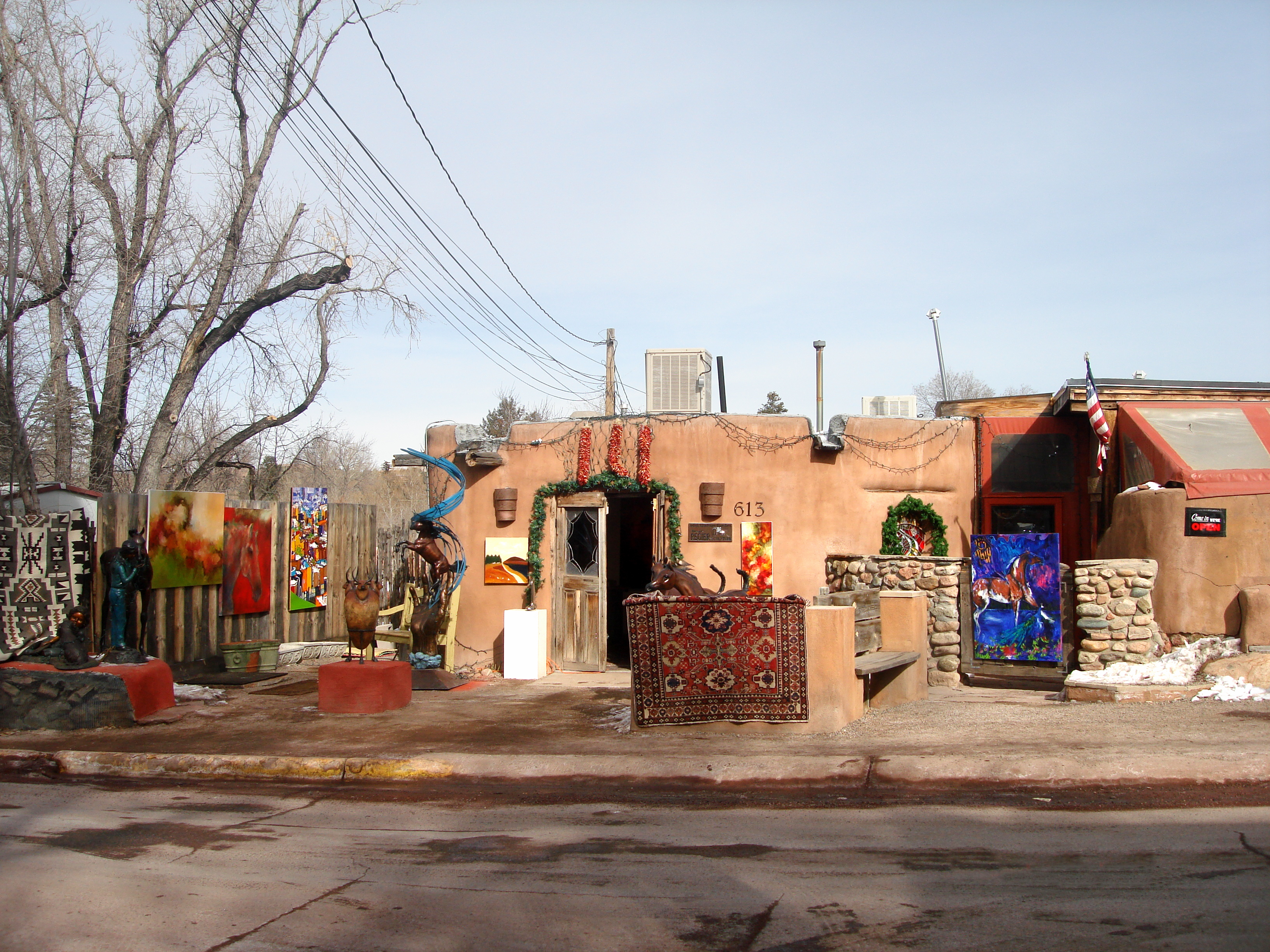
Canyon Road in Santa Fe, New Mexico.

Canyon Road is an art district in Santa Fe, New Mexico with over a hundred art galleries and studios exhibiting a wide range of art, including Native American art and antiquities, historical and contemporary Latino art, regional art, international folk art, and contemporary art.

== History ==
Canyon Road is a long, narrow road that leads to the Sangre de Cristo Mountains. It runs parallel to the Acequia Madre ("mother ditch"), an irrigation ditch dating back to 1680. Prior to Spanish arrival, the road was a footpath between the Santa Fe River Valley and Pecos Pueblo.

Canyon Road was once a primarily residential neighborhood. Houses built in the Pueblo Revival style, in accordance with the local Spanish Colonial and Pueblo methods, were constructed with adobe walls and courtyards, often as compounds for extended family.

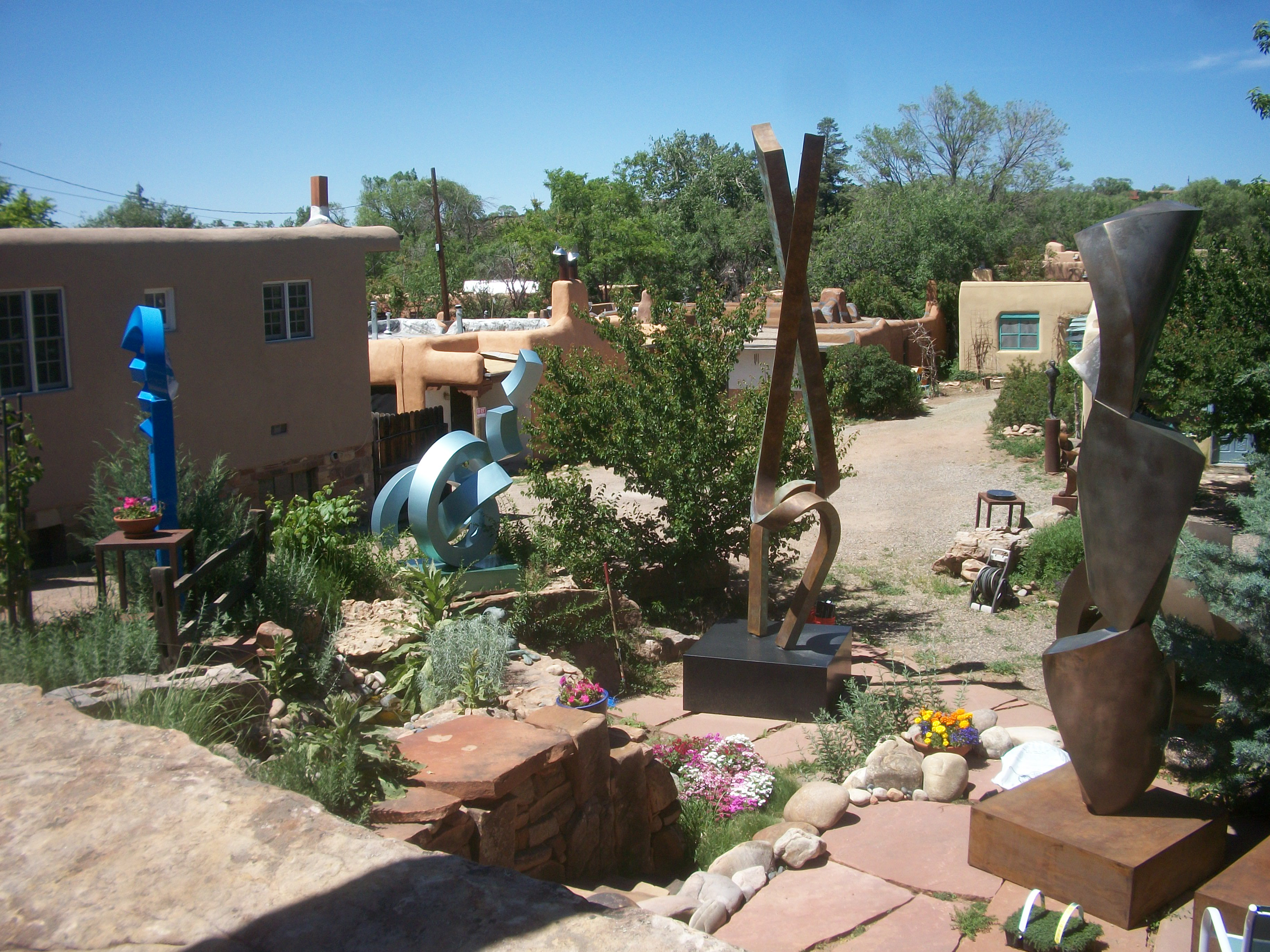
Art installations line this street of almost uniformly adobe-colored structures.

Artists were drawn to its beauty, particularly the Los Cinco Pintores in the 1920s. Olive Rush (1873–1966) was a prominent early Canyon Road artist who maintained a studio at 630 Canyon, which she donated to the Society of Friends. It is still a Quaker meeting hall today. Over time, artists created a subculture of artist-run studios and galleries, and as Santa Fe became more of a tourist destination, Canyon Road became known to the wider world.

== Traditions ==
The area hosts a "Farolito walk" open house event on Christmas Eve that can attract thousands to the area.

== See also ==
- El Farol Bar problem, a game theory problem inspired by a bar on Canyon Road
- Turner Carroll Gallery, "gallery" on Canyon Road
- Cristo Rey Church
