= Downtown Neighborhood, Albuquerque =

Downtown Neighborhood
- Neighborhood of Albuquerque
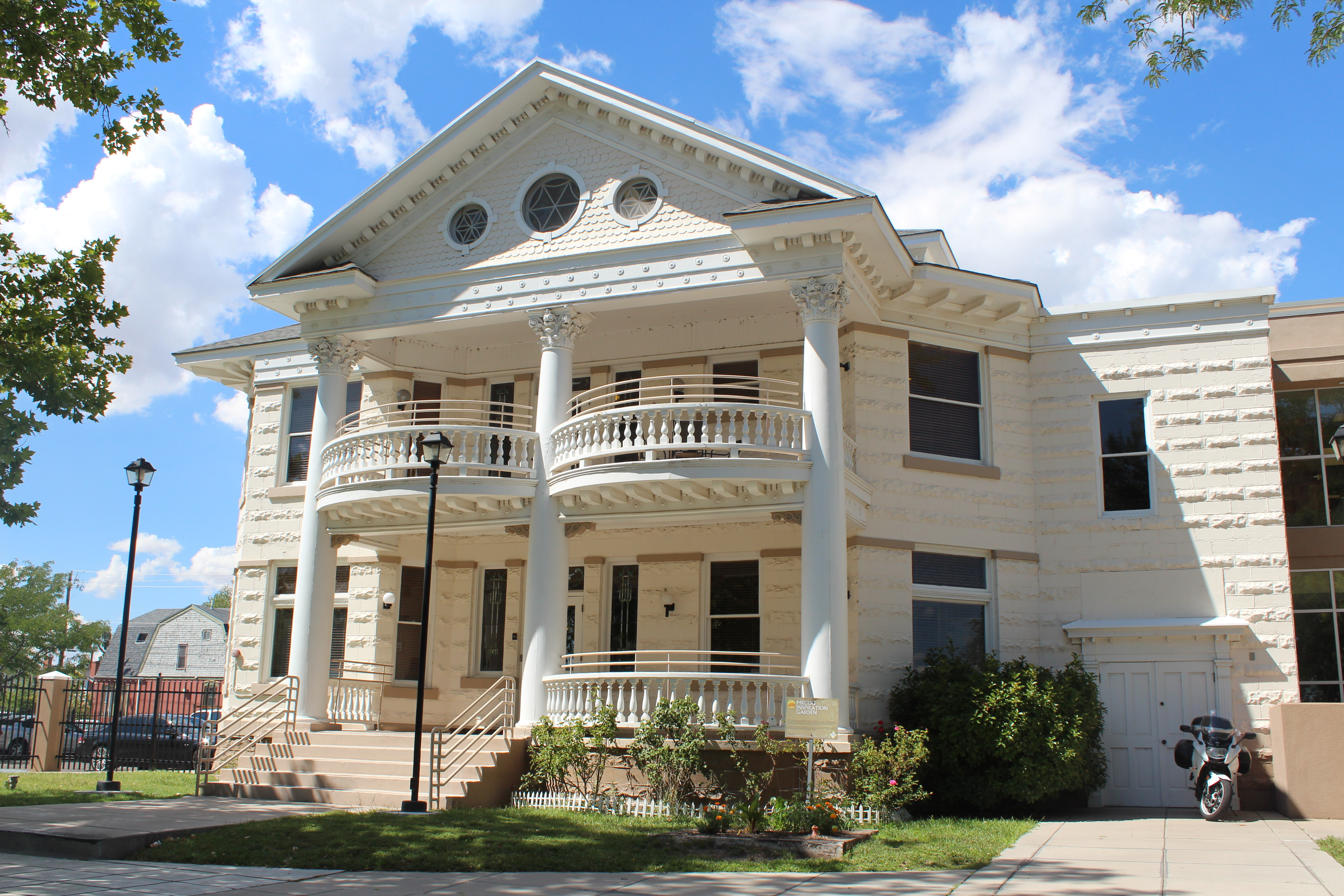
- The Breece House, Fourth Ward Historic District
- Interactive map of Downtown Neighborhood
- Coordinates: 35°05′N 106°40′W

Government
  - City Council: Joaquín Baca
  - State House: Javier Martínez (D)
  - U.S. House: Melanie Stansbury (D)

Area
  - Total: 0.48 sq mi (1.2 km^{2})

Population (2010)
  - Total: 2,551
  - Density: 5,301/sq mi (2,047/km^{2})
- ZIP Code: 87102, 87104
- Area code: 505

The Downtown Neighborhood is a neighborhood in Albuquerque, New Mexico, located between Downtown and Old Town. It is sometimes known as the Fourth Ward based on Albuquerque's former system of political wards. The neighborhood is a mostly residential area consisting largely of single-family dwellings in various sizes and styles constructed between the 1880s and 1940s. There is also a commercial district along Central Avenue which has been branded since 2017 as West Downtown.

== Geography ==
The generally accepted boundaries of the Downtown Neighborhood are Central Avenue to the south, 19th Street to the west, Mountain Road to the north, and Downtown to the east. The boundary with Downtown follows a stair-step pattern extending from 8th Street in the south to 4th Street in the north. Adjoining neighborhoods include Old Town to the west, Wells Park and the Sawmill District to the north, and Huning Castle and the Raynolds Addition to the south.

== Demographics ==
The 2010 United States census recorded a population of 2,551 residents in the Downtown Neighborhood. The racial breakdown of the neighborhood was 48% non-Hispanic white, 43% Hispanic, 3% American Indian, 2% Black, and 4% other races or mixed-race. The racial makeup of the Downtown Neighborhood is similar to that of Albuquerque as a whole.

== History ==
What is now the Downtown Neighborhood was traditionally an agricultural area used by Pueblo people since around 1200. Starting in the 1600s, several haciendas were established in the area by Spanish colonists, possibly including La Glorieta, which is still standing. When the Atchison, Topeka, and Santa Fe Railway reached Albuquerque in 1880, the location of the railroad depot some 1.5 miles (2.4 km) from Old Town Plaza led to the development of a separate "New Town" which became Downtown Albuquerque. The railroad brought an influx of new residents and created demand for additional housing, leading to much of the area between Old Town and New Town being platted for residential lots in 1880–81. The largest of these subdivisions was the Perea Addition, which was laid out by Jose Perea in 1881 and covered most of the land between 11th and 16th Streets.

The Downtown Neighborhood, or Fourth Ward as it was known at the time, developed slowly during the 1880s and 1890s as the Huning Highlands emerged as Albuquerque's most fashionable neighborhood. Once the Highlands were substantially filled in, the Fourth Ward began to see more building activity, with development peaking around 1905–1915 and continuing into the 1940s. The neighborhood reflected a wide variety of income levels and architectural styles, with houses ranging from small New Mexico vernacular adobe cottages in the primarily Hispanic western section to large Queen Anne and Prairie School residences on the so-called Judges' Row on 11th and 12th Streets.

The neighborhood experienced a decline due to increasing suburbanization in the mid-20th century, but the organization of the Downtown Neighborhoods Association in 1974 and greater interest in historic preservation during the 1970s and 1980s helped reverse the trend. In 1976, the city of Albuquerque enacted the Downtown Neighborhood Area Sector Development to guide development in the area. The neighborhood population has remained stable since the 1970s.

== Education ==
The Downtown Neighborhood is served by Albuquerque Public Schools. Lew Wallace Elementary School is located within the neighborhood and serves most of its elementary students, while others attend Reginald Chavez Elementary. Older students are assigned to Washington Middle School and Albuquerque High School.

== Transportation ==
The main thoroughfares in the Downtown Neighborhood are Lomas Boulevard (east-west) and 12th Street (north-south). Mountain Road and Central Avenue run along the northern and southern edges of the neighborhood, respectively.

Public bus transit is provided by ABQ RIDE's 36/37 12th Street/Rio Grande routes, which run along Lomas and 12th, and 790 ARTx Blue Line, which runs along Lomas. The neighborhood also has access to the Albuquerque Rapid Transit (ART) bus rapid transit Red and Green Lines via the West Downtown station.

== Places of interest ==
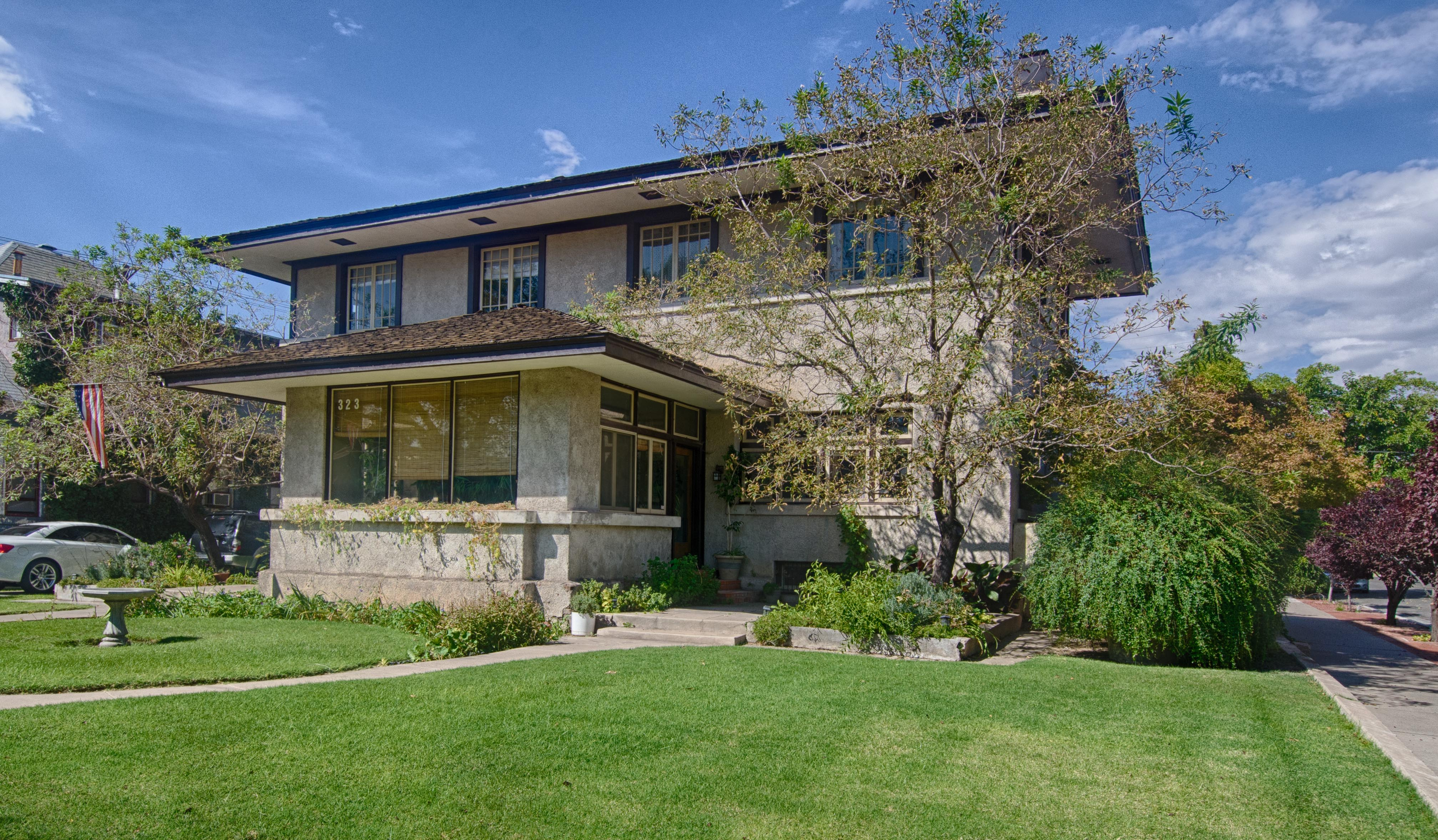
The Berthold Spitz House, a historic Prairie-style residence in the Downtown Neighborhood

The Downtown Neighborhood contains three historic districts listed on the National Register of Historic Places (NRHP): the Fourth Ward Historic District, Eighth Street-Forrester Historic District, and Manzano Court Addition Historic District. Two other historic districts, Watson and Orilla de la Acequia, are listed on the New Mexico State Register of Cultural Properties.

Individually listed NRHP properties in the neighborhood include:

- Chester Carnes House
- Delfina Gurule House
- Harwood School
- A. W. Hayden House
- La Glorieta
- Charles LeFeber House
- Hilario Lopez House
- Henry Mann House
- W. E. Mauger House
- J. H. O'Rielly House
- Berthold Spitz House
