= Gurule =

Gurule is a surname. Notable people with the surname include:

- Delfina Gurule (1883–1979), owner of Delfina Gurule House in Albuquerque, New Mexico, U.S.
- Jimmy Gurulé (born 1951), American attorney, academic and government official
- Martin Gurule (1969–1998), American prisoner
- Luis Gurule (born 1993), American Mixed Martial Artist
