= Fourth Ward Historic District (Albuquerque, New Mexico) =

- U.S. National Register of Historic Places
- U.S. Historic district
- NM State Register of Cultural Properties
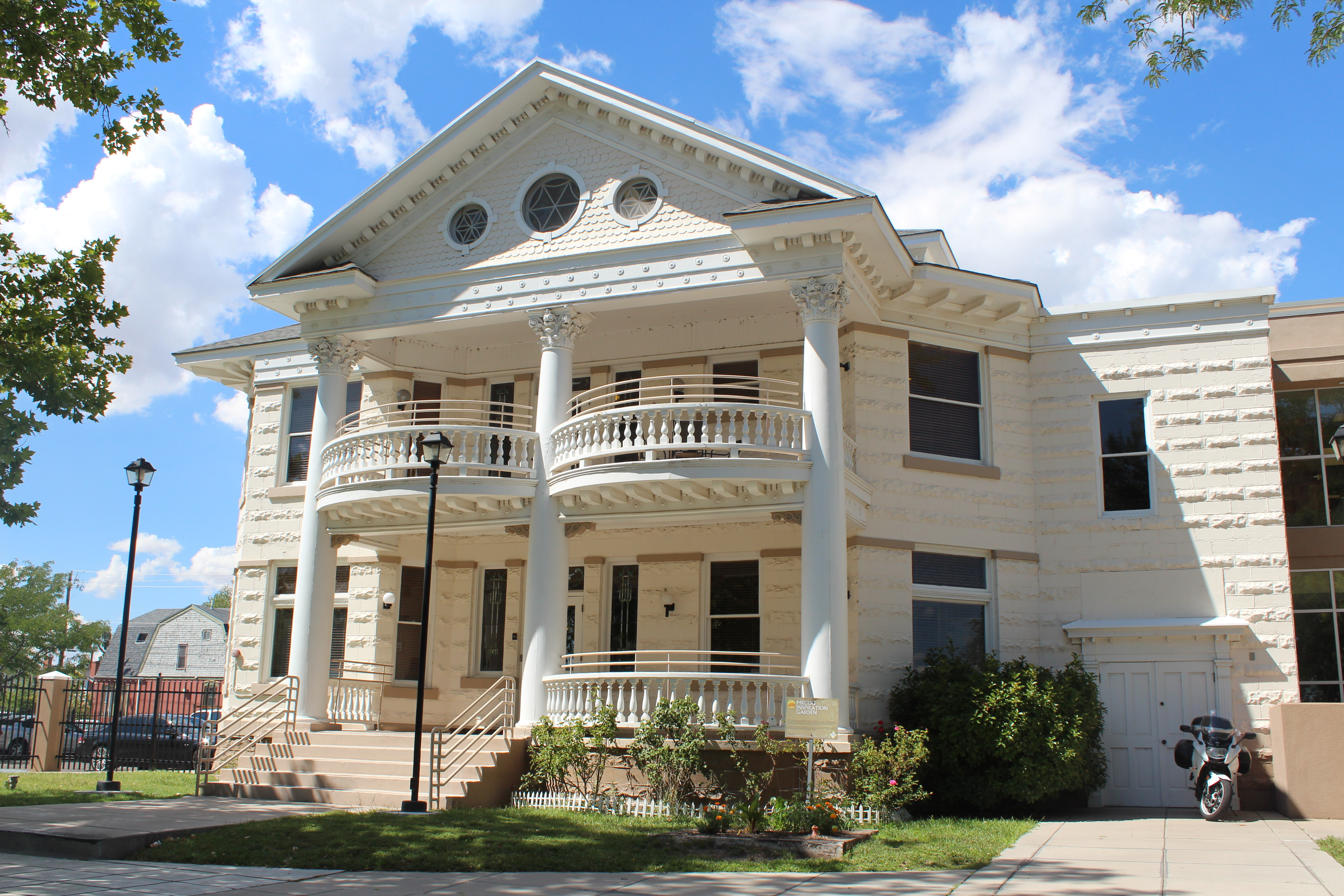
- The Breece House, 2014

- Location within New Mexico Location within the United States
- Location: Downtown Neighborhood, Albuquerque, New Mexico
- Coordinates: 35°05′N 106°40′W
- NRHP reference No.: 80002534
- NMSRCP No.: 733

Significant dates
- Added to NRHP: December 1, 1980
- Designated NMSRCP: August 24, 1979

The Fourth Ward Historic District is a historic district in Albuquerque, New Mexico which encompasses an area between Downtown and Old Town which is roughly bounded by Central Avenue, 8th Street and Keleher Avenue, Lomas Boulevard, and 15th Street. It is named for its location in the city's former fourth political ward. The district is almost entirely residential and developed at a "leisurely pace" between the 1880s and 1930s. As a result, it includes houses in a wide variety of sizes and styles including Queen Anne, Italianate, Tudor, Dutch Colonial, Prairie School, Mediterranean, Pueblo, Territorial, Mission, and Bungalow. The district was added to the New Mexico State Register of Cultural Properties in 1979 and the National Register of Historic Places in 1980.

The district includes two properties which are also individually listed on the National Register, the J. H. O'Rielly House and Berthold Spitz House.
