= Charles LeFeber House =

Historic house in New Mexico, United States

- U.S. National Register of Historic Places
- NM State Register of Cultural Properties
- Location within New Mexico Location within the United States
- Location: 313 15th St. NW, Albuquerque, New Mexico
- Coordinates: 35°5′28″N 106°39′48″W
- Built: 1909
- Architectural style: Eclectic, Tudor Revival
- NRHP reference No.: 80002540
- NMSRCP No.: 741

Significant dates
- Added to NRHP: December 1, 1980
- Designated NMSRCP: August 24, 1979

The Charles LeFeber House is a historic house in the Downtown Neighborhood of Albuquerque, New Mexico. It was built in 1909 and was the home of Charles A. LeFeber (c. 1883–1957), a local contractor, until his death. LeFeber probably built the house himself. It was listed on the New Mexico State Register of Cultural Properties in 1979 and the National Register of Historic Places in 1980.

The house is notable for its unusual architecture. It is an eclectic cottage with "touches of Tudor Revival styling", and does not resemble any other designs that were popular at the time. In particular, it has a very unusual gable roof with sloped ends and an angled porch roof supported by two Doric columns. The house originally had clapboard siding but is now stuccoed.
