= Fannie S. Spitz =

American inventor (1873–1943)

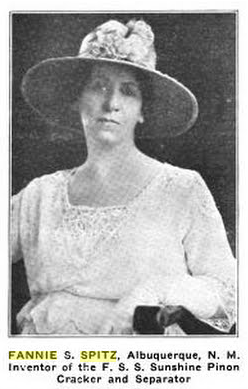
- Spitz, from a 1922 publication
- Born: Fannie Schutz; February 14, 1873
- Died: October 17, 1943 (aged 70); Pasadena, California, U.S.
- Occupation: Inventor
- Known for: Patenting the first machine to shell pine nuts for commercial use
- Spouse: Berthold V. Spitz (m. 1893; died 1933)

Fannie Schutz Spitz (February 14, 1873 – October 17, 1943) was an American inventor. She patented the first machine to shell pine nuts for commercial use.

== Early life ==
Fannie Schutz was from El Paso, Texas, the daughter of Samuel Schutz and Friederike Siebenborn Schutz. Both of her parents were born in Germany. Her father was a merchant. Her cousin Solomon C. Schutz was elected El Paso's third mayor in 1880.

== Career ==
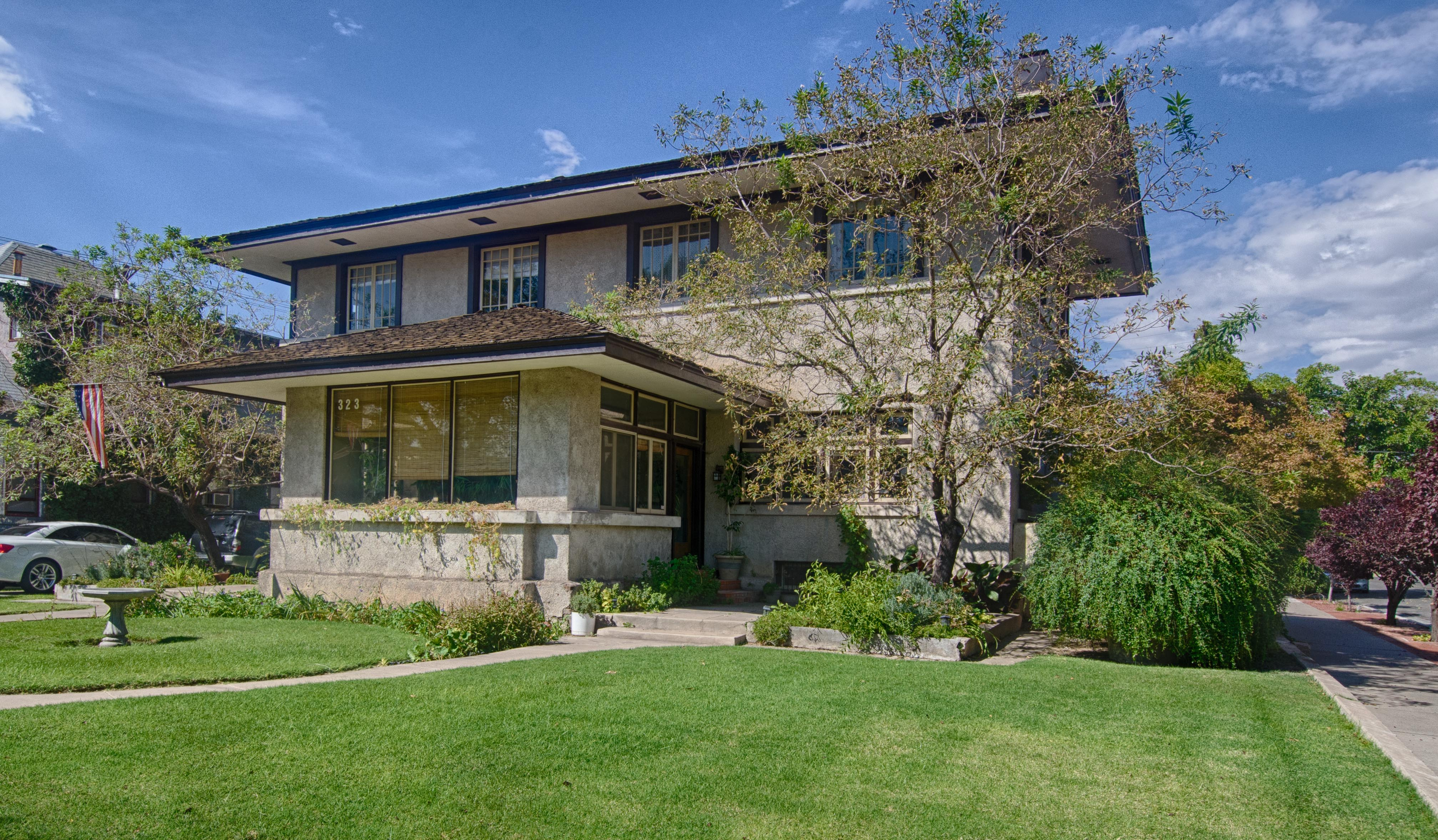
Berthold Spitz House

Spitz invented the first practical machine for shelling pine nuts in bulk. She traveled to study nut processing methods, and spent months as an apprentice in a machine shop, before she built a prototype of her original design in her basement workshop. She was granted a patent for the "Method and Apparatus for Shelling Nuts" in 1918. She also sold pine nuts from her Albuquerque farm, and promoted their nutritional value and culinary possibilities. She also exhibited the machine at a national convention of confectioners in 1922, in Chicago. She also experimented with using the machine for processing coffee beans. The Albuquerque Journal declared her "the greatest known authority on the pinon nut and its possibilities". In October 1923, she announced that she was retiring and seeking buyers to take over her business.

== Personal life and legacy ==
Fannie D. Schutz married Berthold V. Spitz, a Jewish immigrant from Bohemia, in 1893. The couple were among the founders of Congregation Albert, a synagogue still active in Albuquerque, New Mexico. She was widowed when Berthold died in 1933. She died in Pasadena, California, in 1943, aged 70 years, from a heart attack.

The Berthold Spitz House in Albuquerque was placed on the National Register of Historic Places in 1977.
