= Eighth Street–Forrester Historic District =

- U.S. National Register of Historic Places
- U.S. Historic district
- NM State Register of Cultural Properties
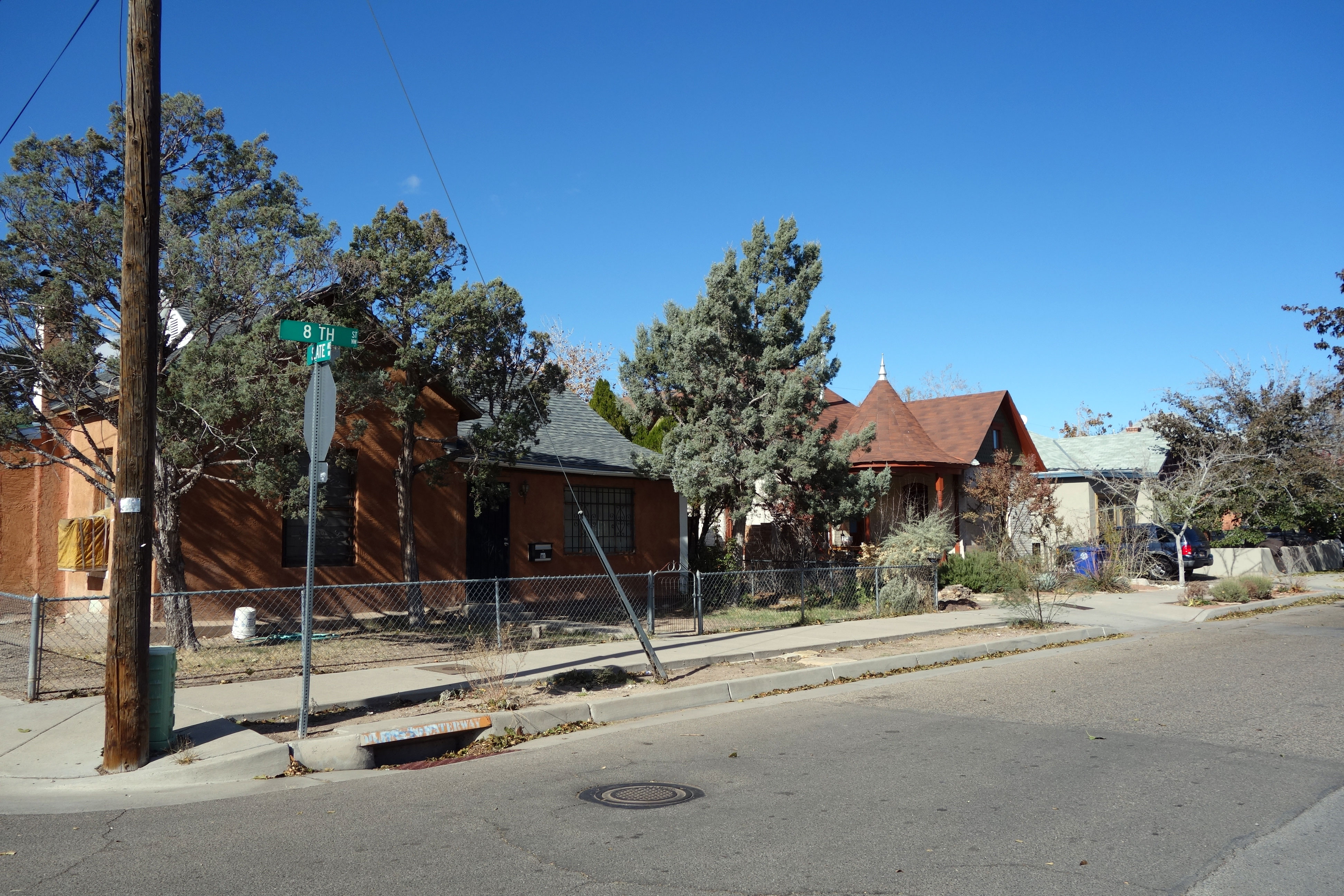
- Northwest corner of 8th St. and Slate Ave. NW, 2014

- Location within New Mexico Location within the United States
- Location: Downtown Neighborhood, Albuquerque, New Mexico
- Coordinates: 35°05′37″N 106°39′17″W
- NRHP reference No.: 80002532
- NMSRCP No.: 731

Significant dates
- Added to NRHP: December 1, 1980
- Designated NMSRCP: August 24, 1979

The Eighth Street–Forrester Historic District is a historic district in the Downtown Neighborhood of Albuquerque, New Mexico which primarily encompasses the two parallel streets Eighth Street and Forrester Avenue between Lomas Boulevard and Mountain Road. The district is almost entirely residential, consisting mainly of well preserved lower-middle-class homes built between 1905 and 1915. Most of the houses are modest examples of the "Hipped Box" form, while the Queen Anne, Bungalow, and southwest vernacular styles are also represented. The district was added to the New Mexico State Register of Cultural Properties in 1979 and the National Register of Historic Places in 1980.
