= Manzano Court Addition Historic District =

- U.S. National Register of Historic Places
- U.S. Historic district
- NM State Register of Cultural Properties
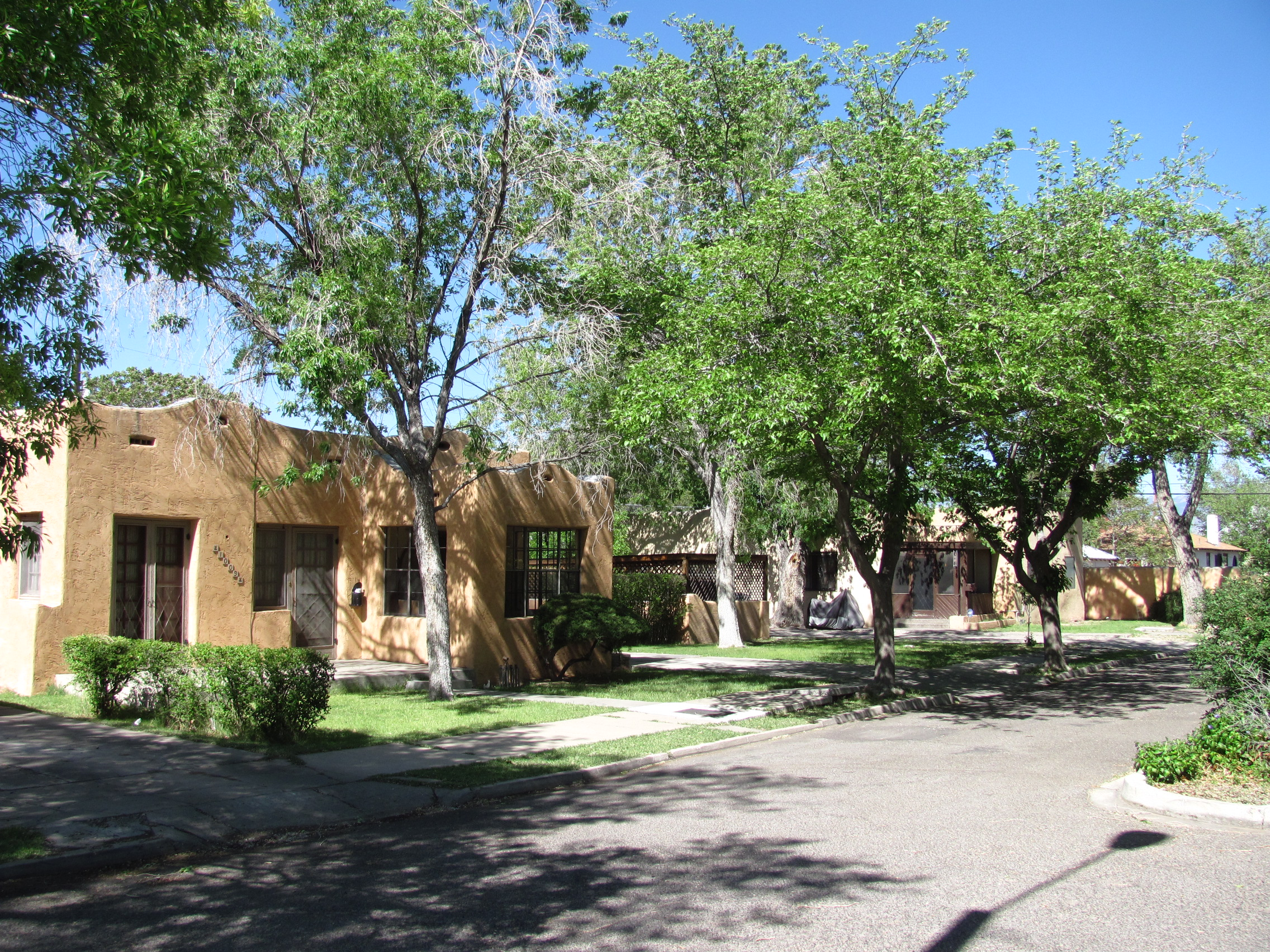
- Manzano Court in 2010

- Location within New Mexico Location within the United States
- Location: 1000–1025 Manzano Court NW; Albuquerque, New Mexico
- Coordinates: 35°5′43″N 106°39′29″W
- Built: 1923–1937
- Architect: Anna Swetland Gotshall
- NRHP reference No.: 03001234
- NMSRCP No.: 1838

Significant dates
- Added to NRHP: October 14, 2004
- Designated NMSRCP: August 8, 2003

The Manzano Court Addition Historic District is a historic district in the Downtown Neighborhood of Albuquerque, New Mexico. It encompasses the entirety of the Manzano Court Addition, a small subdivision consisting of a one-block-long cul-de-sac and twelve surrounding houses, eight of which are contributing properties. The subdivision was platted in 1923 by Anna Swetland Gotshall (1892–1985), an Ohio native who came to Albuquerque for tuberculosis treatment. Gotshall also designed and built the subdivision's first eight houses between 1925 and 1928. Four additional houses were completed later. The district was added to the New Mexico State Register of Cultural Properties in 2003 and the National Register of Historic Places in 2004.

Manzano Court is a short cul-de-sac opening onto 11th Street with six houses on either side. It incorporates various features drawing inspiration from the City Beautiful movement, including landscaped medians and an ornamental gateway at the entrance to the court, which are unusual in the city. Of the eight contributing houses, seven are Gotshall's original houses at 1000, 1001, 1004, 1008, 1009, 1013, and 1021 Manzano Court. These houses are of differing designs and materials, but share a similar scale and modest Mission Revival details. The eighth contributing house (1025) was built in 1937 and is in the Pueblo Revival style. Three newer houses and one of Gotshall's houses that was remodeled are considered non-contributing.
