= John Pearce House =

Historic house in New Mexico, United States

- U.S. National Register of Historic Places
- NM State Register of Cultural Properties
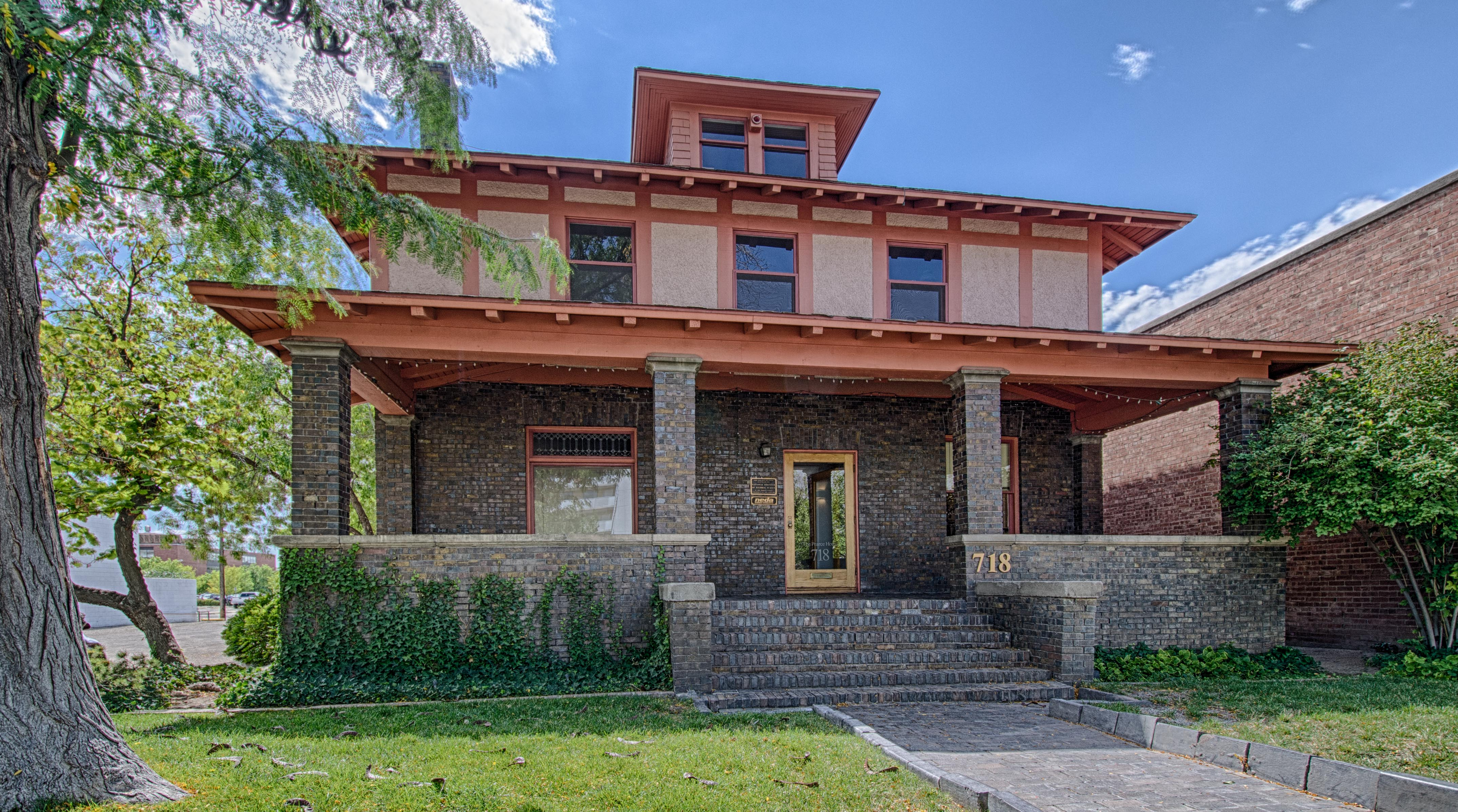
- The house in 2012

- Location within New Mexico Location within the United States
- Location: 718 Central Ave. SW, Albuquerque, New Mexico
- Coordinates: 35°5′5″N 106°39′18″W
- Built: 1905
- Architectural style: American Foursquare
- NRHP reference No.: 80002546
- NMSRCP No.: 782

Significant dates
- Added to NRHP: November 22, 1980
- Designated NMSRCP: September 16, 1980

The John Pearce House is a historic house in Albuquerque, New Mexico. It is notable for its architecture and as the only extant house on the Downtown section of Central Avenue, which is otherwise occupied entirely by commercial buildings. The house was built in 1905 by Dr. John F. Pearce (c. 1859–1937), one of the city's first physicians. The contractor, Wallace Hesselden, also built the Henry Mann House the same year. After Pearce moved out of the house in 1933, it was used for various functions including a boarding house and chiropractic clinic. In 1982, the house was renovated and converted to office space. The architect for the renovation was Antoine Predock. The property was added to the New Mexico State Register of Cultural Properties and the National Register of Historic Places in 1980. It is next door to another historic structure, the Skinner Building.

The house is a two-and-a-half-story building generally adhering to the American Foursquare design, with a rectangular plan, a pyramidal hipped roof with dormers on three sides, and a full-width porch. The ground floor and porch columns are faced with dark-colored clinker brick, while the second floor is stuccoed with half-timbering reminiscent of the Tudor Revival style. Both of these wall treatments are unusual for Albuquerque. The clinker brick was also used to build a wall and walkway in front of the house.
