= Harwood School =

- U.S. National Register of Historic Places
- NM State Register of Cultural Properties
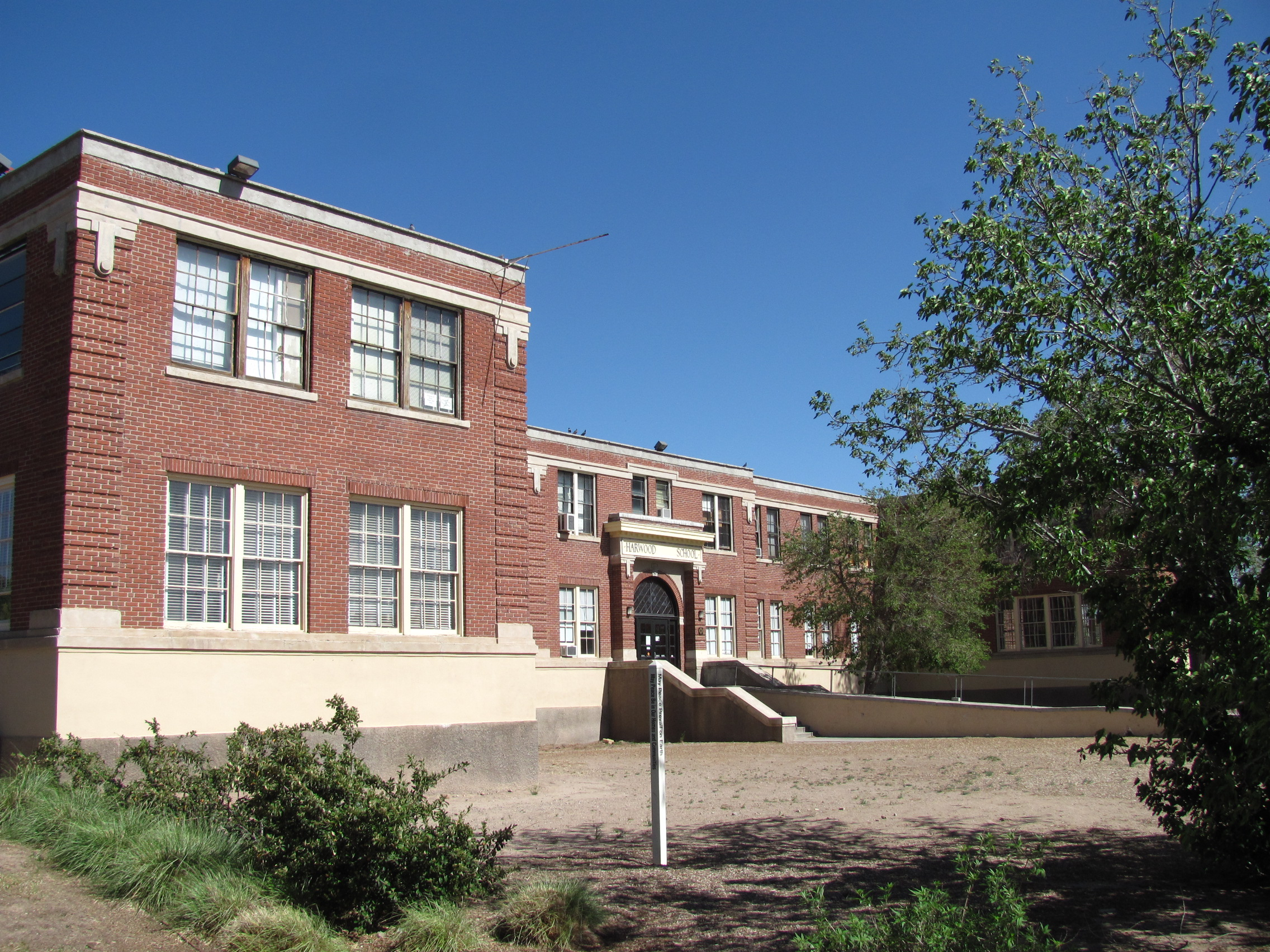
- Harwood School, May 2010
- Location: 1114 7th Street NW, Albuquerque, New Mexico
- Coordinates: 35°05′42″N 106°39′13″W
- Built: 1925
- Architectural style: Neoclassical Revival
- NRHP reference No.: 80002537
- NMSRCP No.: 737

Significant dates
- Added to NRHP: December 1, 1980
- Designated NMSRCP: August 24, 1979

The Harwood School is a historic building in Albuquerque, New Mexico, which was originally a Methodist boarding school. Built in 1925, it is a two-story, H-shaped building with a red brick facade and Neoclassical detailing. The building ceased operating as a school in 1976 and now houses a community art center as part of the outreach programs of Escuela del Sol Montessori (an independent school serving children aged 18 months through 8th grade). It was listed on the New Mexico State Register of Cultural Properties in 1979 and the National Register of Historic Places in 1980.

The Harwood Girls' School was established in 1887 by Emily Harwood and her husband Thomas, a Methodist minister. The school operated from various locations including a house in Downtown Albuquerque before moving to the 7th Street location in 1925. Two additional buildings were added to the campus in 1935 and 1940, respectively. The Harwood School continued to serve girls in grades 1-12 until the 1970s, when it was closed due to lack of funding.
