= Berthold Spitz House =

United States historic place

- U.S. National Register of Historic Places
- U.S. Historic district – Contributing property
- NM State Register of Cultural Properties
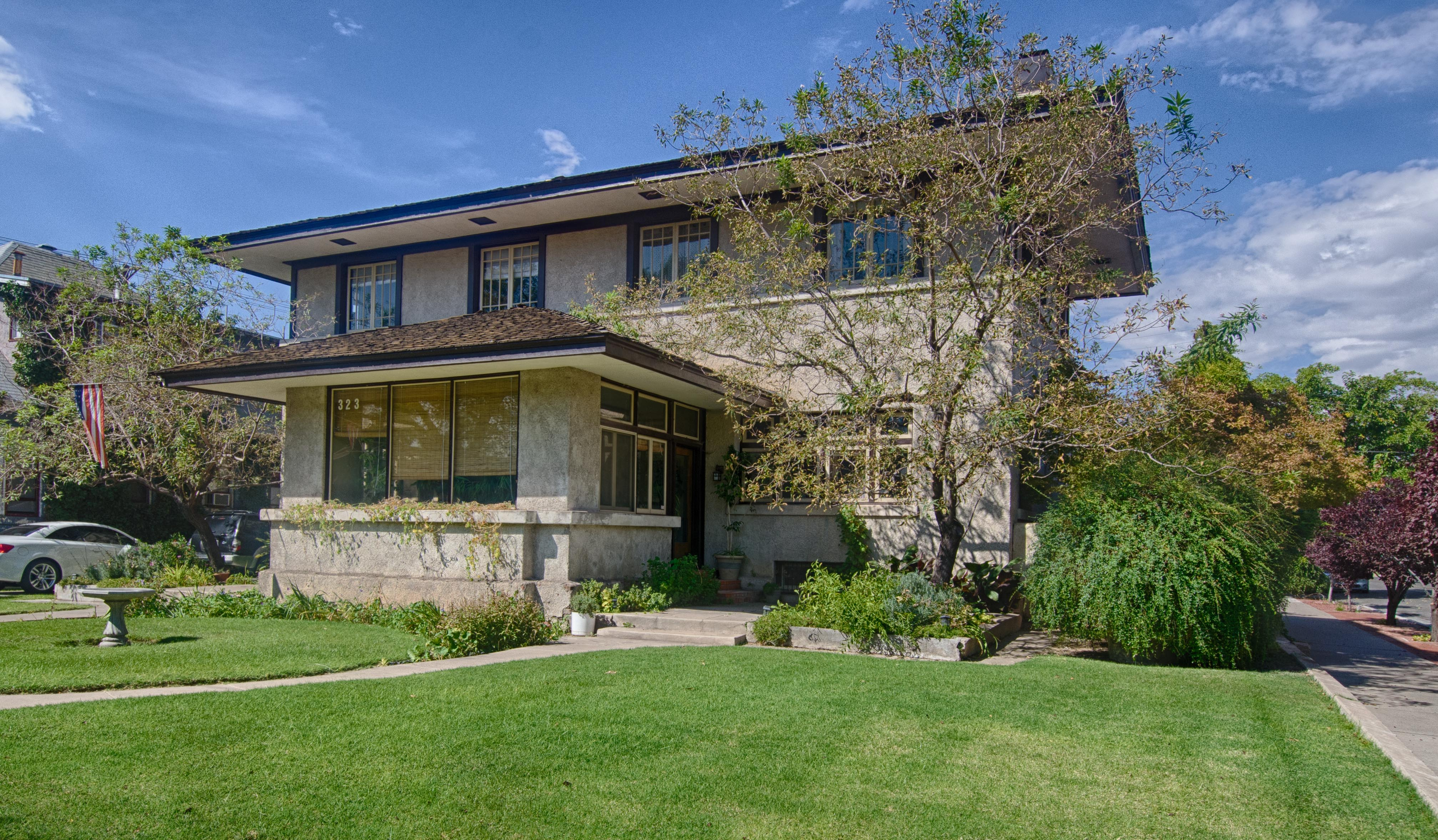
- The house in 2012

- Location within New Mexico Location within the United States
- Location: 323 10th St. NW, Albuquerque, New Mexico
- Coordinates: 35°5′19″N 106°39′28″W
- Built: c. 1910
- Architect: Trost & Trost
- Architectural style: Prairie School
- Part of: Fourth Ward Historic District (ID80002534)
- NRHP reference No.: 77000922
- NMSRCP No.: 371

Significant dates
- Designated NRHP: December 22, 1977
- Designated CP: December 1, 1980
- Designated NMSRCP: February 28, 1975

The Berthold Spitz House is a historic house in Albuquerque, New Mexico, which is significant as the city's best example of Prairie School architecture. It was built around 1910 by Berthold Spitz (c. 1860–1933) and his wife Fannie Schutz Spitz (1873–1943). Berthold was a German Jewish merchant who was born in Bohemia (present-day Czech Republic) and immigrated to Albuquerque around 1880. He ran a successful dry goods business and made a few forays into local politics before being appointed as the city's postmaster in 1921. Fannie grew up in El Paso and was notable as the inventor of the first commercial pine nut shelling machine. She was described by the Albuquerque Journal as "the greatest known authority on the piñon nut and its possibilities". The house was designed by Henry C. Trost of the El Paso firm of Trost & Trost. It was listed on the New Mexico State Register of Cultural Properties in 1975 and the National Register of Historic Places in 1977.

The house is a two-story masonry building with a broadly overhanging hipped roof. The design is relatively simple and lacks the heavy ornamentation of some of Trost's other Prairie houses, including his own residence in El Paso. The Spitz House has stuccoed walls with dark wooden trim around the casement windows and a projecting sill course on the second floor. The front elevation is symmetrical, with a hipped entrance porch, while the rear has an asymmetrical two-story projection and less regular window patterns.
