= Chester Carnes House =

Historic house in New Mexico, United States

- U.S. National Register of Historic Places
- NM State Register of Cultural Properties
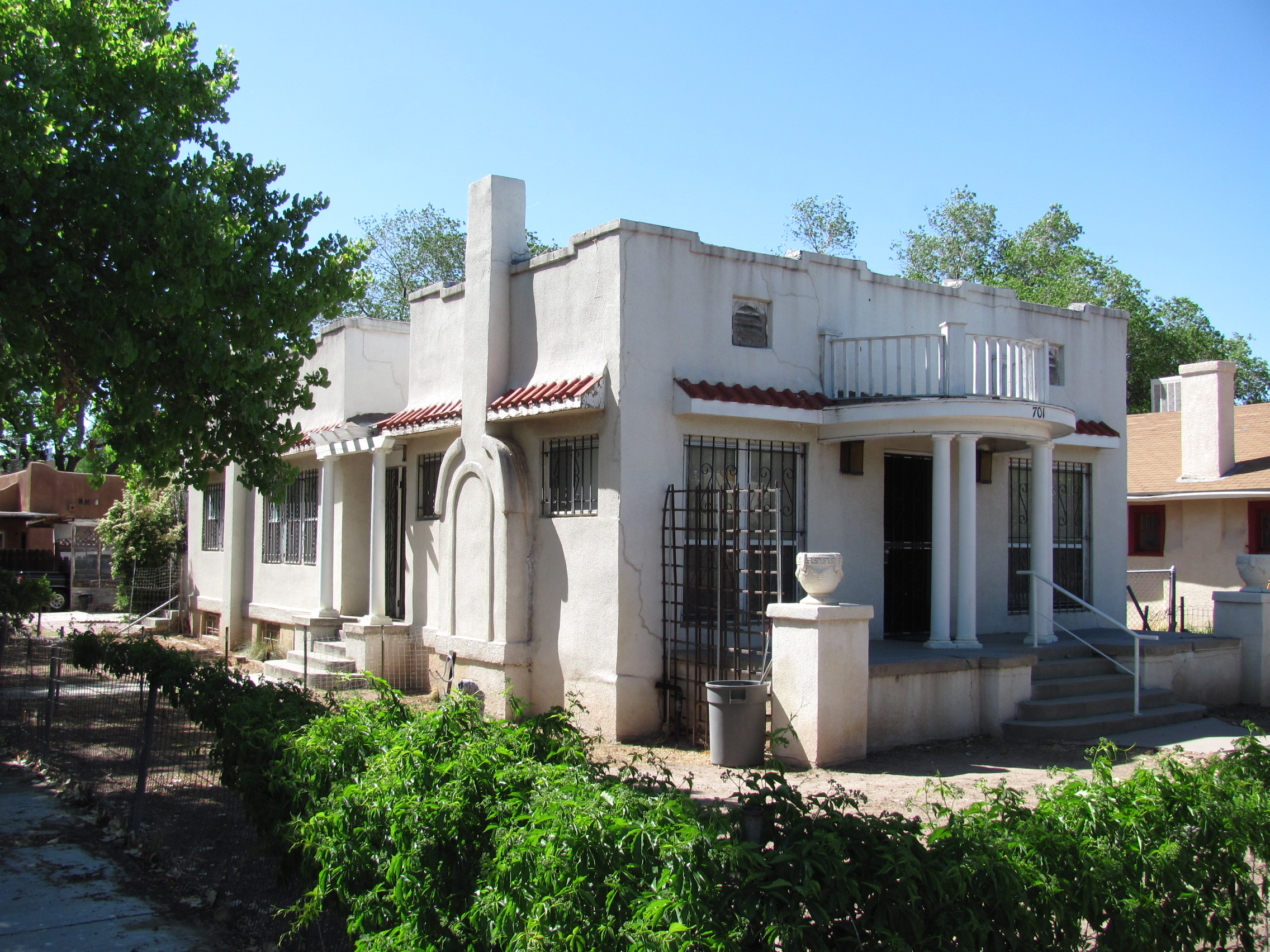
- The house in 2010

- Location within New Mexico
- Location: 701 13th Street, NW, Albuquerque, New Mexico
- Coordinates: 35°05′38″N 106°39′36″W
- Area: 0.2 acres (0.081 ha)
- Built: 1923
- Built by: Lembke Construction
- Architectural style: Mediterranean Revival
- MPS: Albuquerque Downtown Neighborhoods MRA
- NRHP reference No.: 80002529
- NMSRCP No.: 729

Significant dates
- Added to NRHP: December 1, 1980
- Designated NMSRCP: August 24, 1979

The Chester Carnes House is a historic house in Albuquerque, New Mexico. It was built in 1923 by Lembke Construction for Chester Carnes, an optometrist who was the president of the New Mexico Optometric Association, his wife Helen, and their three sons. It was designed in the Mediterranean Revival architectural style. It was listed on the New Mexico State Register of Cultural Properties in 1979 and the National Register of Historic Places in 1980.
