= W. E. Mauger House =

- U.S. National Register of Historic Places
- NM State Register of Cultural Properties
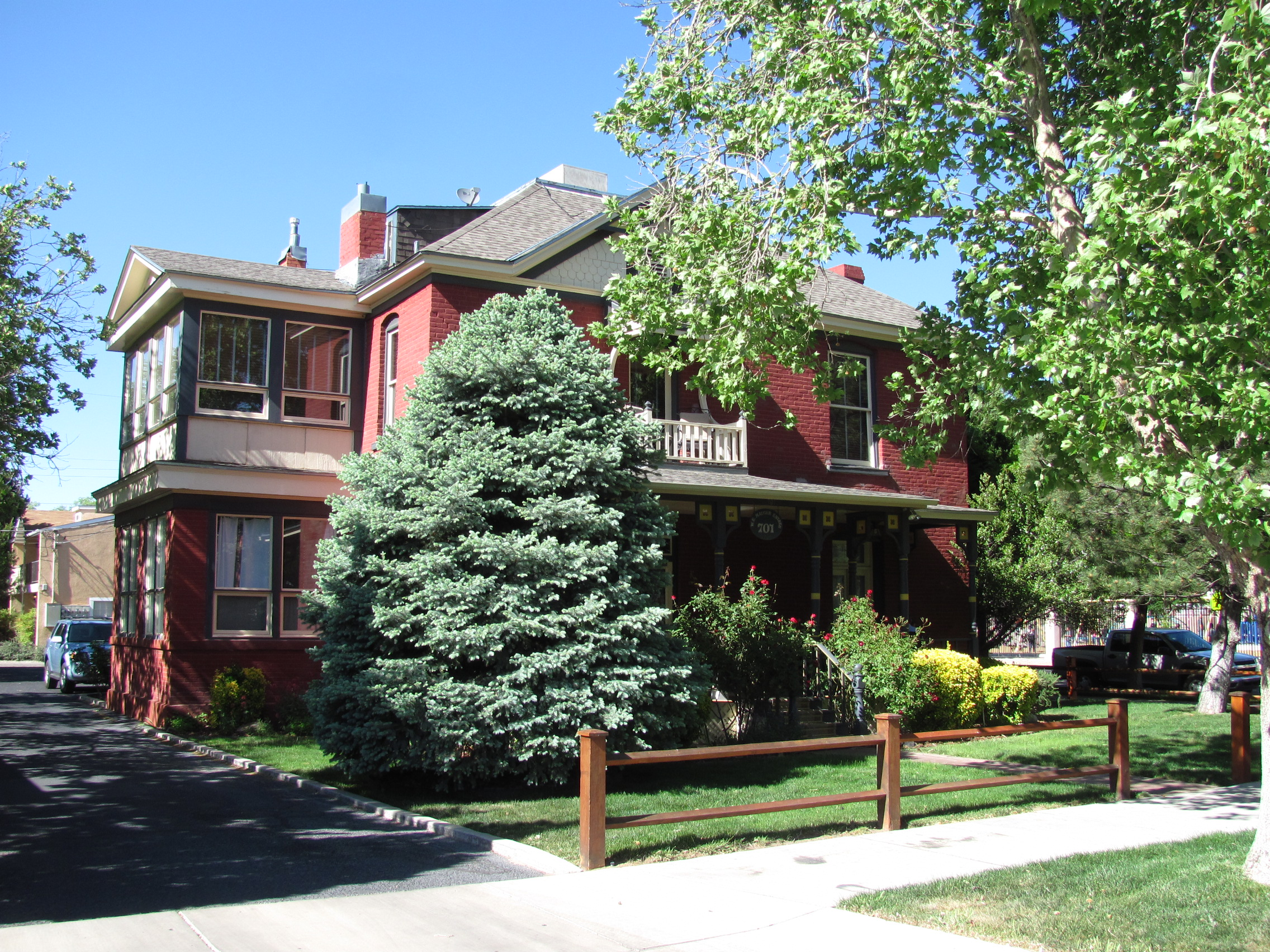
- The house in 2010

- Location within New Mexico Location within the United States
- Location: 701 Roma Ave. NW, Albuquerque, New Mexico
- Coordinates: 35°5′23″N 106°39′14″W
- Built: c. 1896
- Architectural style: Queen Anne
- NRHP reference No.: 85000375
- NMSRCP No.: 1127

Significant dates
- Added to NRHP: February 28, 1985
- Designated NMSRCP: January 11, 1985

The W. E. Mauger House is a historic Queen Anne style home in Albuquerque, New Mexico. It was built around 1896 by Maude Goodlander and Martha Talbott, but is most closely associated with William and Brittania Mauger, who owned it from 1907 to 1932. Later, it was converted into a boarding house and remained in use as rental housing until the 1980s. Starting in 1985, the building was restored to its original appearance and has operated as a bed and breakfast since 1987. It is a 2 1/2 story brick house with a hip roof, asymmetrical front elevation with a large entrance porch, and a two-level sleeping porch on the west side. The house was added to the New Mexico State Register of Cultural Properties and the National Register of Historic Places in 1985 as "701 Roma NW".

== History ==
The house was built by Maude Goodlander and her mother, Martha Talbott, who was reportedly one of Albuquerque's earliest Anglo residents, having moved there after the U.S. Civil War. Goodlander bought the lot from Franz Huning in 1895 and the house was reported to be under construction in September 1896. Goodlander and Talbott moved to Missouri in 1899, keeping the house as a rental property at first and then selling it to William E. Mauger (1867–1923) in 1907. Mauger was a wool buyer and hardware store owner who moved to Albuquerque in 1902 for health reasons after contracting tuberculosis. He added a third lot to the property in 1912, enabling the construction of a two-story sleeping porch on the west side of the house. After Mauger died in 1923, his widow Brittania (1865–1968) lived in the house until 1932.

Around 1940, the building was converted into a boarding house and the rooms were partitioned to create a total of 18 rental units. It remained in use for this purpose until the 1980s, by which time the building was in poor condition. In 1984, the house was purchased by Richard Carleno, a local geologist, who spent two years and $200,000 carefully restoring it to its original appearance. The renovation included restoring the rooms to their original size, reopening the porches, which had been stuccoed over at some point, and replacing all of the plumbing. Once the project was complete, Carleno opened the house as a bed and breakfast in 1987. As of 2020, it remains in operation as the Mauger Estate Bed & Breakfast.

== Architecture ==
The Mauger House is a 2 1/2 story Queen Anne style building, constructed from brick laid in the common bond. It has a truncated hip roof with shingled gables on the front and rear elevations and small shed-roofed dormers on the side elevations. The asymmetrical south (front) elevation has a large open porch on the ground floor and another small porch on the second floor centered under the front gable. The west side of the house has a two-level sleeping porch which was added after 1912. A notable feature on the east side is a pair of oval windows which flank an interior fireplace. The interior of the house was restored maintaining much of the original trim.
