= J. H. O'Rielly House =

- U.S. National Register of Historic Places
- U.S. Historic district – Contributing property
- NM State Register of Cultural Properties
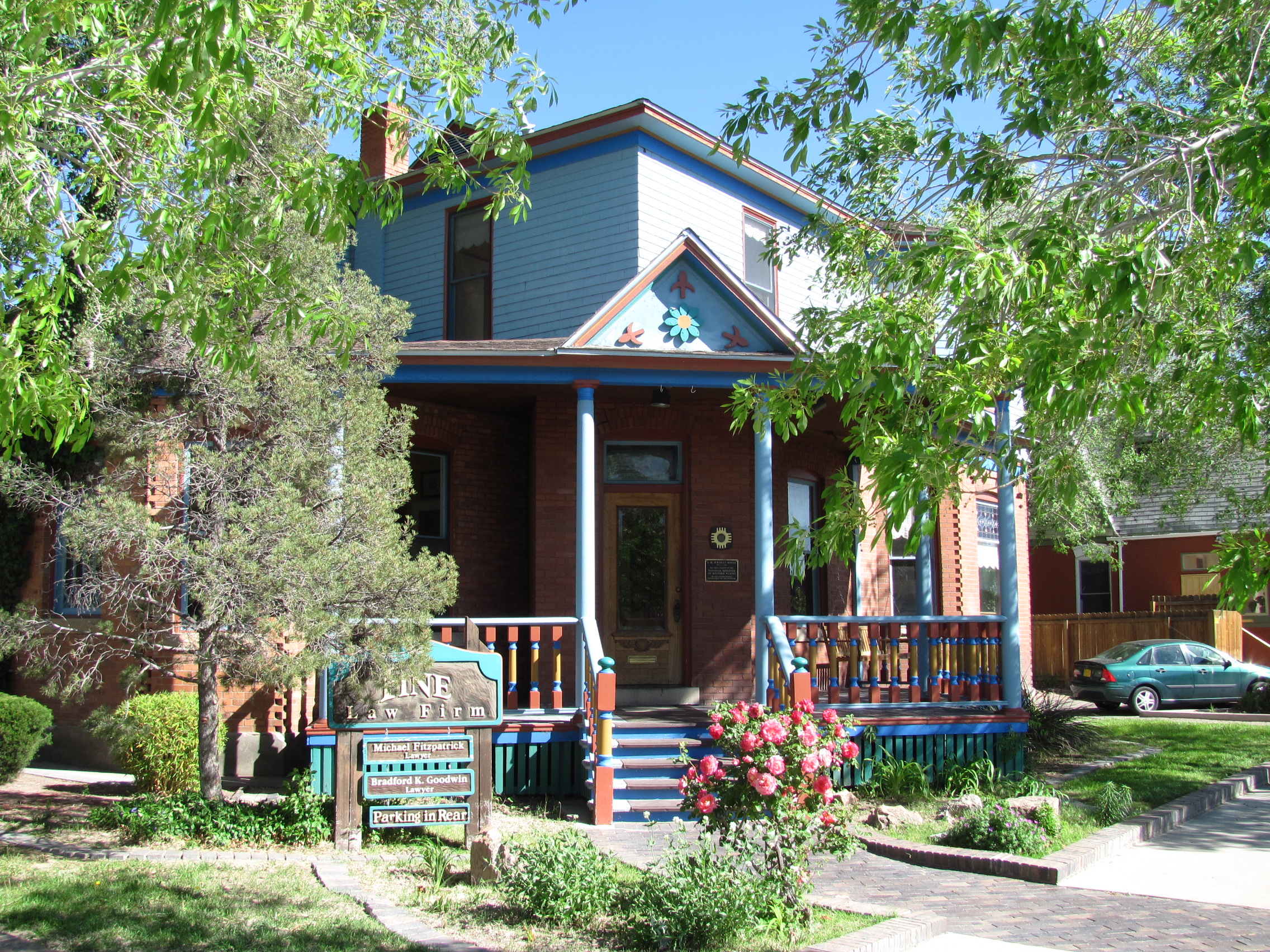
- The house in 2010

- Location within New Mexico Location within the United States
- Location: 220 9th St. NW, Albuquerque, New Mexico
- Coordinates: 35°5′13″N 106°39′23″W
- Built: c. 1904
- Architectural style: Queen Anne
- Part of: Fourth Ward Historic District (ID80002534)
- NRHP reference No.: 79003442
- NMSRCP No.: 534

Significant dates
- Designated NRHP: January 29, 1979
- Designated CP: December 1, 1980
- Designated NMSRCP: November 20, 1977

The J. H. O'Rielly House is a historic Queen Anne style home in Albuquerque, New Mexico. It was built around 1904 by H. H. Tilton, a local real estate developer, and was originally rented to J. H. O'Rielly, who owned a drugstore and was also a manager at the Occidental Life Insurance Company. O'Rielly bought the house in 1909 and continued to live there until 1917. The house was added to the New Mexico State Register of Cultural Properties in 1977 and the National Register of Historic Places in 1979.

The O'Rielly House is a two-story, hip-roofed building with a brick first floor and shingled frame second floor. It is rectangular in plan, with bay windows on the north and west elevations on either side of a corner porch which is oriented at 45 degrees to the rest of the house. The windows are wood-framed double-hung units; those on the first floor are set in arched openings with stone sills and some have ornamental stained glass panes. A two-story frame addition was constructed at the rear of the house sometime in the 1920s.
