= Hilario Lopez House =

Historic house in New Mexico, United States

- U.S. National Register of Historic Places
- NM State Register of Cultural Properties
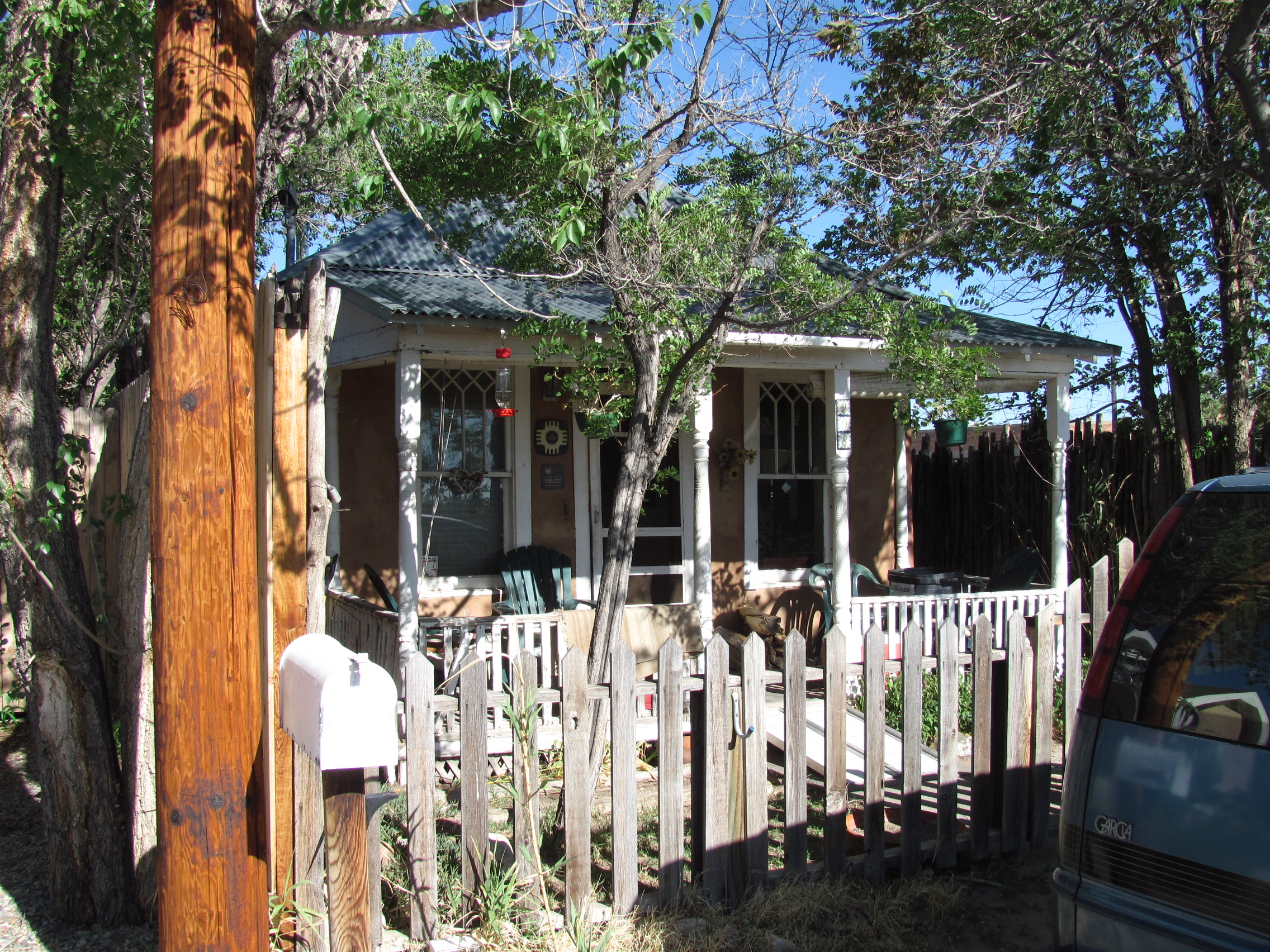
- The house in 2010

- Location within New Mexico Location within the United States
- Location: 208 16th St. NW, Albuquerque, New Mexico
- Coordinates: 35°5′28″N 106°39′48″W
- Built: c. 1907
- Architectural style: New Mexico Vernacular
- NRHP reference No.: 80002542
- NMSRCP No.: 1286

Significant dates
- Added to NRHP: December 1, 1980
- Designated NMSRCP: August 24, 1979

The Hilario Lopez House is a historic house in Albuquerque, New Mexico. It was built around 1907 by Hilario Lopez, who worked as a carpenter for the Atchison, Topeka and Santa Fe Railway. The house was added to the New Mexico State Register of Cultural Properties in 1979 and the National Register of Historic Places in 1980.

The house is an example of New Mexico vernacular architecture, with adobe walls and a corrugated metal roof. The house has a hipped roof with exposed rafters and a shed-roofed wooden porch supported by six turned columns. The front elevation is symmetrical with two wood-framed sash windows flanking the main entrance door. The front windows and transom over the door have ornamental diamond panes. There is also a small bay window on the south side of the house.
