= A. W. Hayden House =

Historic house in New Mexico, United States

- U.S. National Register of Historic Places
- NM State Register of Cultural Properties
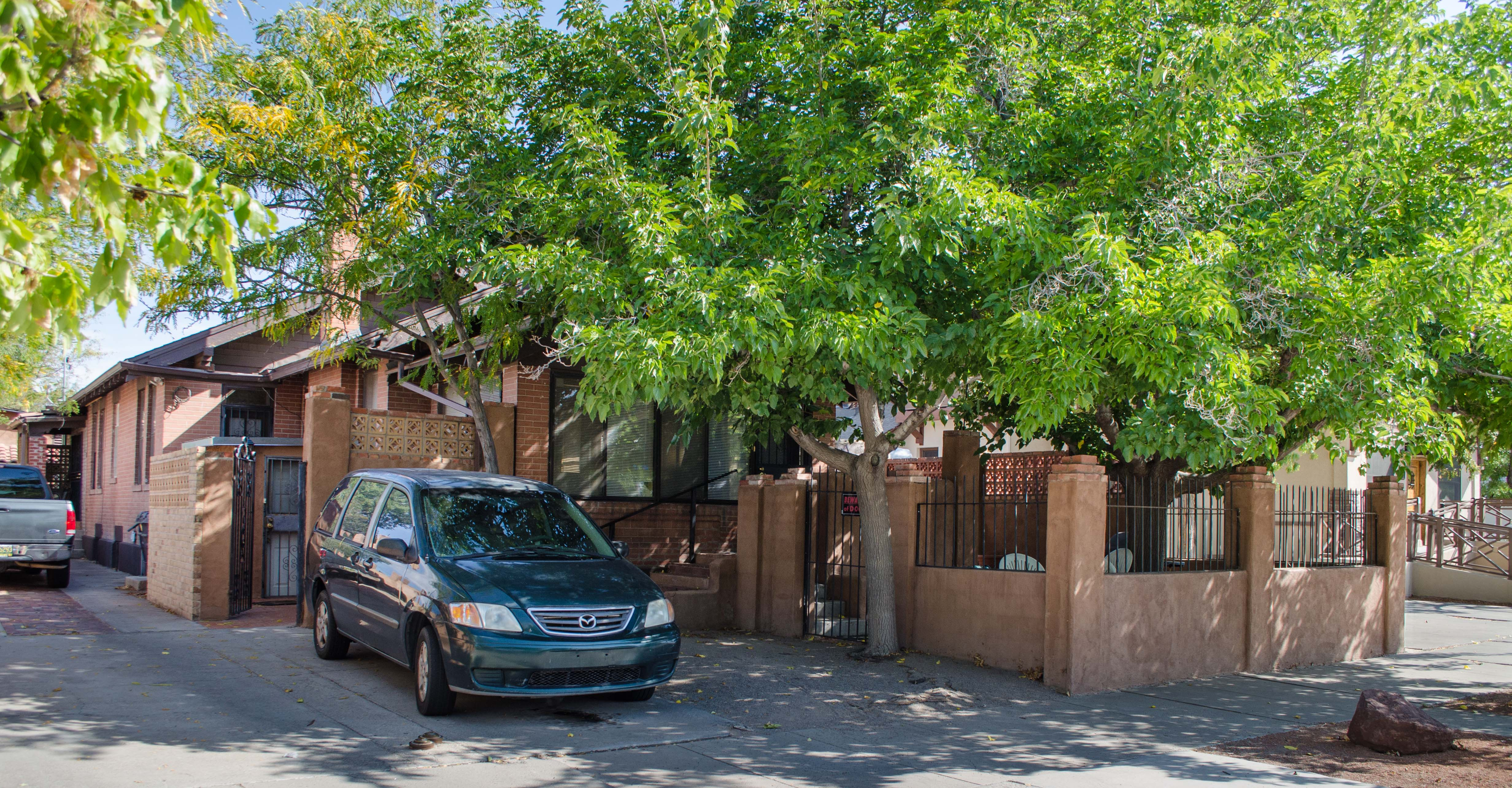
- The A. W. Hayden House in 2012

- Location within New Mexico Location within the United States
- Location: 609 Marble Avenue NW, Albuquerque, New Mexico
- Coordinates: 35°5′37″N 106°39′7″W
- Built: 1920
- Architectural style: American Craftsman
- NRHP reference No.: 80002538
- NMSRCP No.: 753

Significant dates
- Added to NRHP: December 1, 1980
- Designated NMSRCP: October 26, 1979

The A. W. Hayden House is a historic home in Albuquerque, New Mexico, United States. It was built in 1920 by A. W. Hayden, who was a local contractor and probably constructed the house himself. The property was added to the New Mexico State Register of Cultural Properties in 1979 and the National Register of Historic Places in 1980. It is a one-story, brick Craftsman style house with an unusual roofline consisting of three stepped, front-facing gables. Each gable has shingled gable ends, overhanging eaves supported by wooden brackets, and exposed rafter ends. The house also has 1-over-1 sash windows and an enclosed porch.
