= Henry Mann House =

Historic house in New Mexico, United States

- U.S. National Register of Historic Places
- NM State Register of Cultural Properties
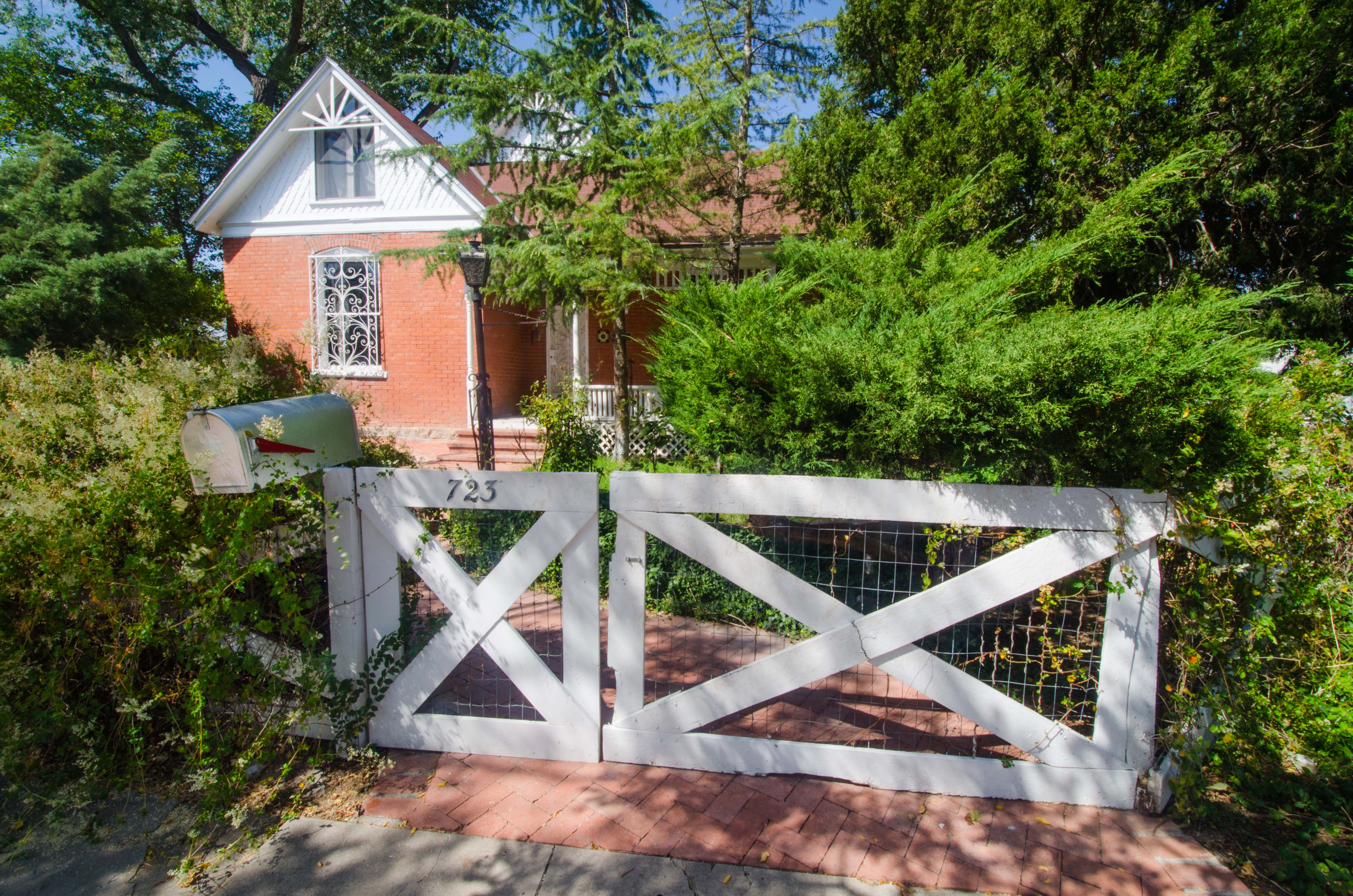
- The house in 2012

- Location within New Mexico Location within the United States
- Location: 723 14th St. NW, Albuquerque, New Mexico
- Coordinates: 35°5′44″N 106°39′38″W
- Built: 1905
- Architectural style: Queen Anne
- NRHP reference No.: 80002543
- NMSRCP No.: 742

Significant dates
- Added to NRHP: December 1, 1980
- Designated NMSRCP: August 24, 1979

The Henry Mann House is a historic house in Albuquerque, New Mexico. It was built in 1905 by Henry Mann, who operated a market garden near Old Town with his brothers. The house cost $2,700 and the contractor was Wallace Hesselden, who also completed the John Pearce House the same year. The property was added to the New Mexico State Register of Cultural Properties in 1979 and the National Register of Historic Places in 1980.

The house is a one-and-a-half-story brick building with modest Queen Anne elements. The house has a complex roofline, with a high Dutch gable over the main body of the house and smaller intersecting gables on both street-facing elevations. The lower gable ends are shingled and decorated with radiating spindles at each peak. The ground-floor windows are 1-over-1 wooden sash windows set in arched openings. The house also has shed-roofed front and rear porches with turned wooden posts.
