= Delfina Gurule House =

Historic house in New Mexico, United States

- U.S. National Register of Historic Places
- NM State Register of Cultural Properties
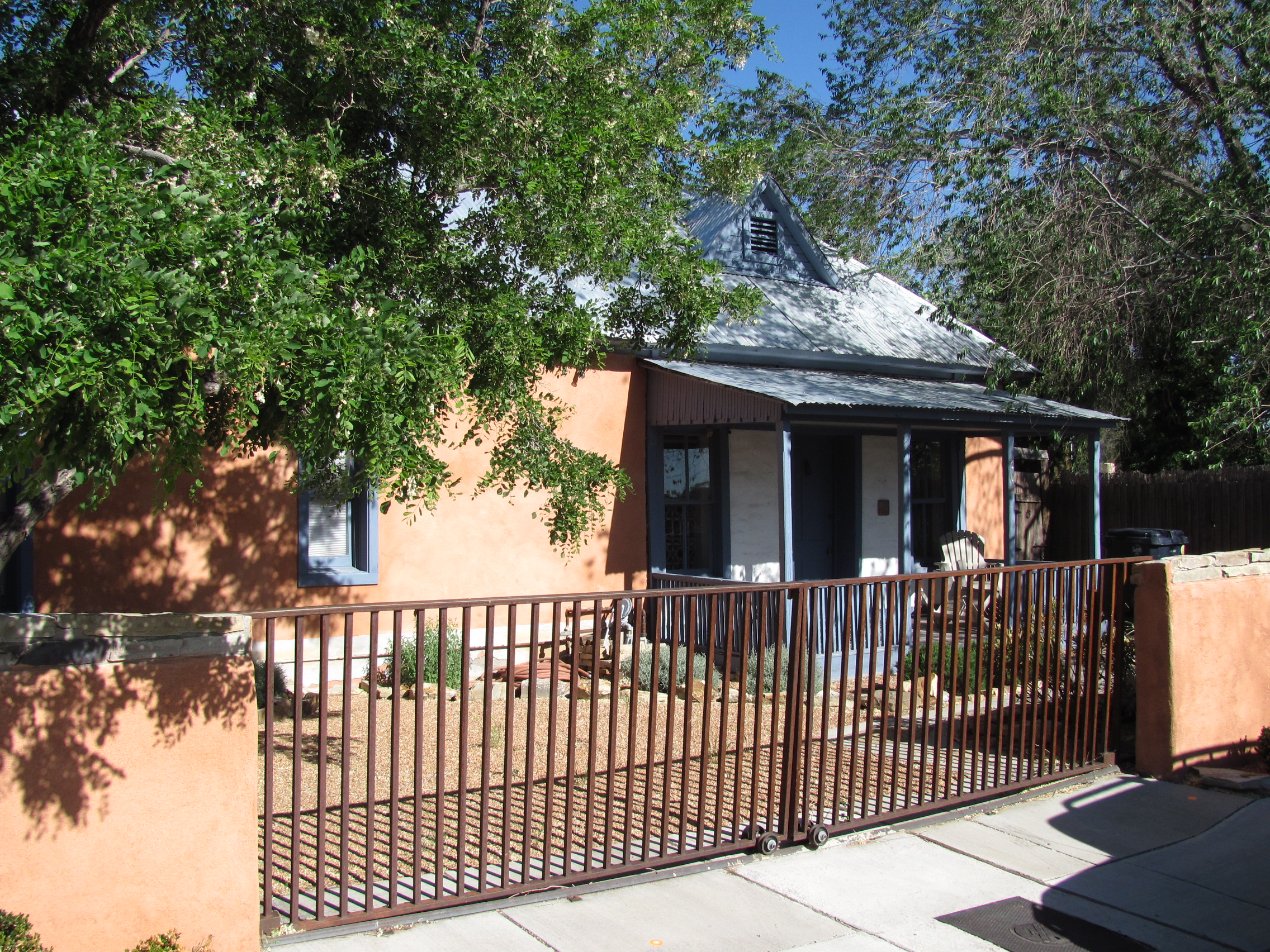
- The house in 2010

- Location within New Mexico Location within the United States
- Location: 306 16th St. NW, Albuquerque, New Mexico
- Coordinates: 35°5′32″N 106°39′48″W
- Built: c. 1912
- Architectural style: New Mexico Vernacular
- NRHP reference No.: 80002536
- NMSRCP No.: 1285

Significant dates
- Added to NRHP: December 1, 1980
- Designated NMSRCP: August 24, 1979

The Delfina Gurule House (Note: The property is listed in the NRHP as the Delfinia Gurule house; however, all other sources give her name as Delfina.) is a historic house in Albuquerque, New Mexico. It was built by Delfina Gurule (1883–1979), who bought the lot in 1912 from Dolores Otero Burg, the daughter of former Congressional delegate Mariano S. Otero. The house was probably built shortly afterward, and Gurule lived there until her death in 1979. The building was added to the New Mexico State Register of Cultural Properties in 1979 and the National Register of Historic Places in 1980.

The house is an example of New Mexico vernacular architecture, with adobe walls and a corrugated metal roof. The original section of the house is T-shaped and has a symmetrical three-bay front elevation with a shed-roofed wooden porch. The main roof consists of a hipped front section intersecting a gabled rear section. The windows in the front of the house are set in wooden frames, while those on the other sides of the house are set directly in the adobe walls with a wooden lintel. An addition was constructed on the north side of the house in the 1980s.
