= Albuquerque, New Mexico =

City in New Mexico, United States

Albuquerque
- City
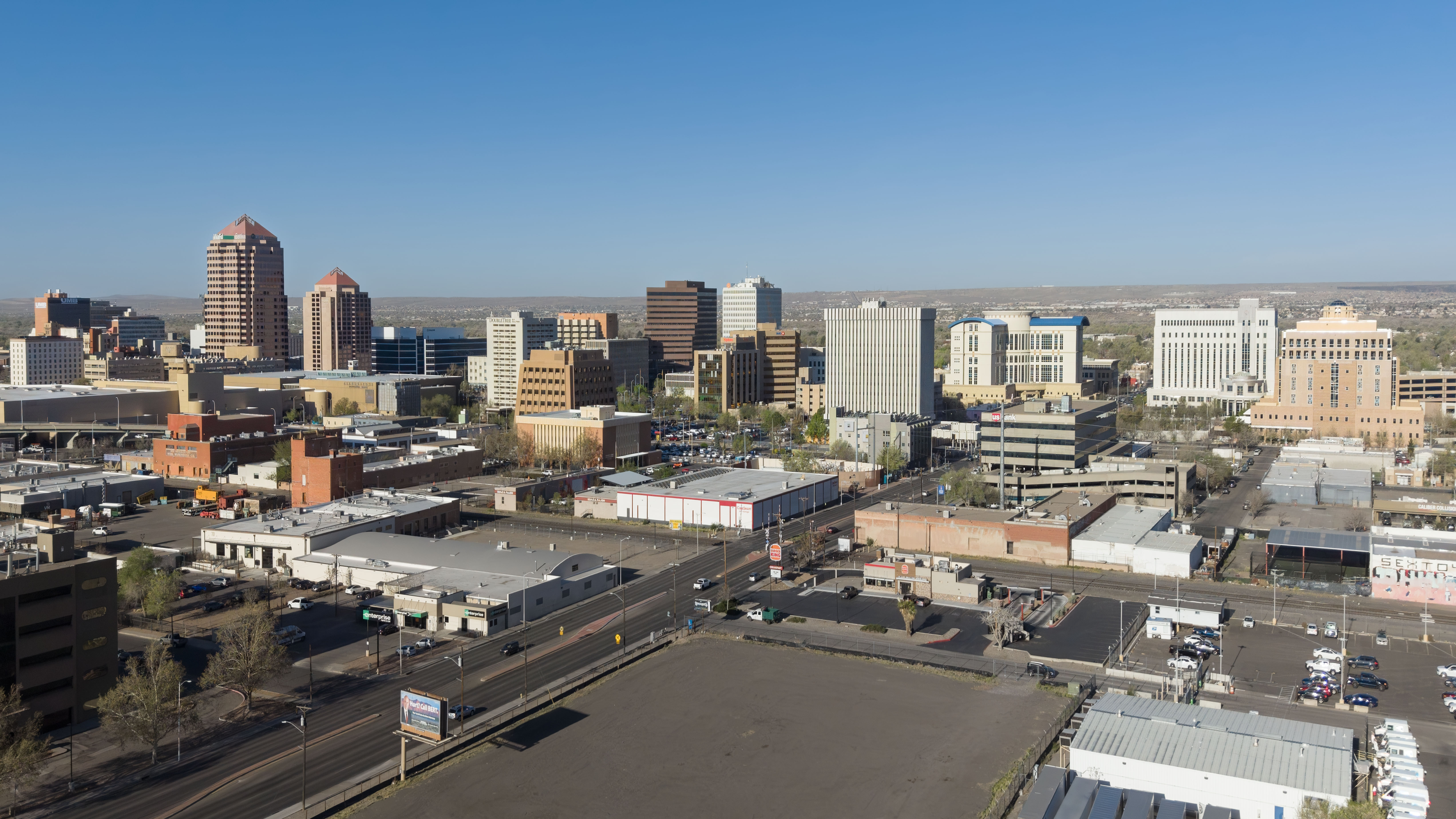
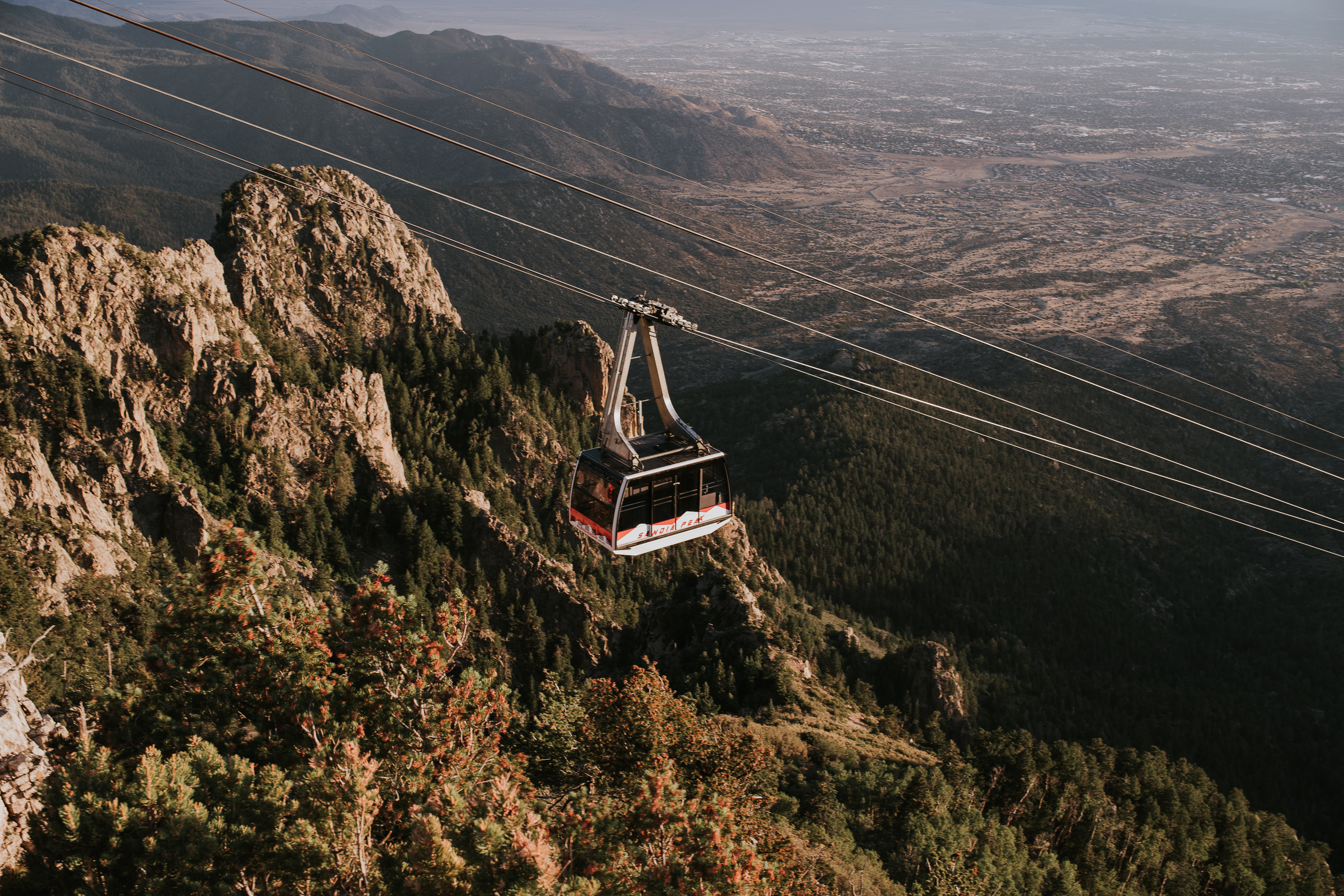
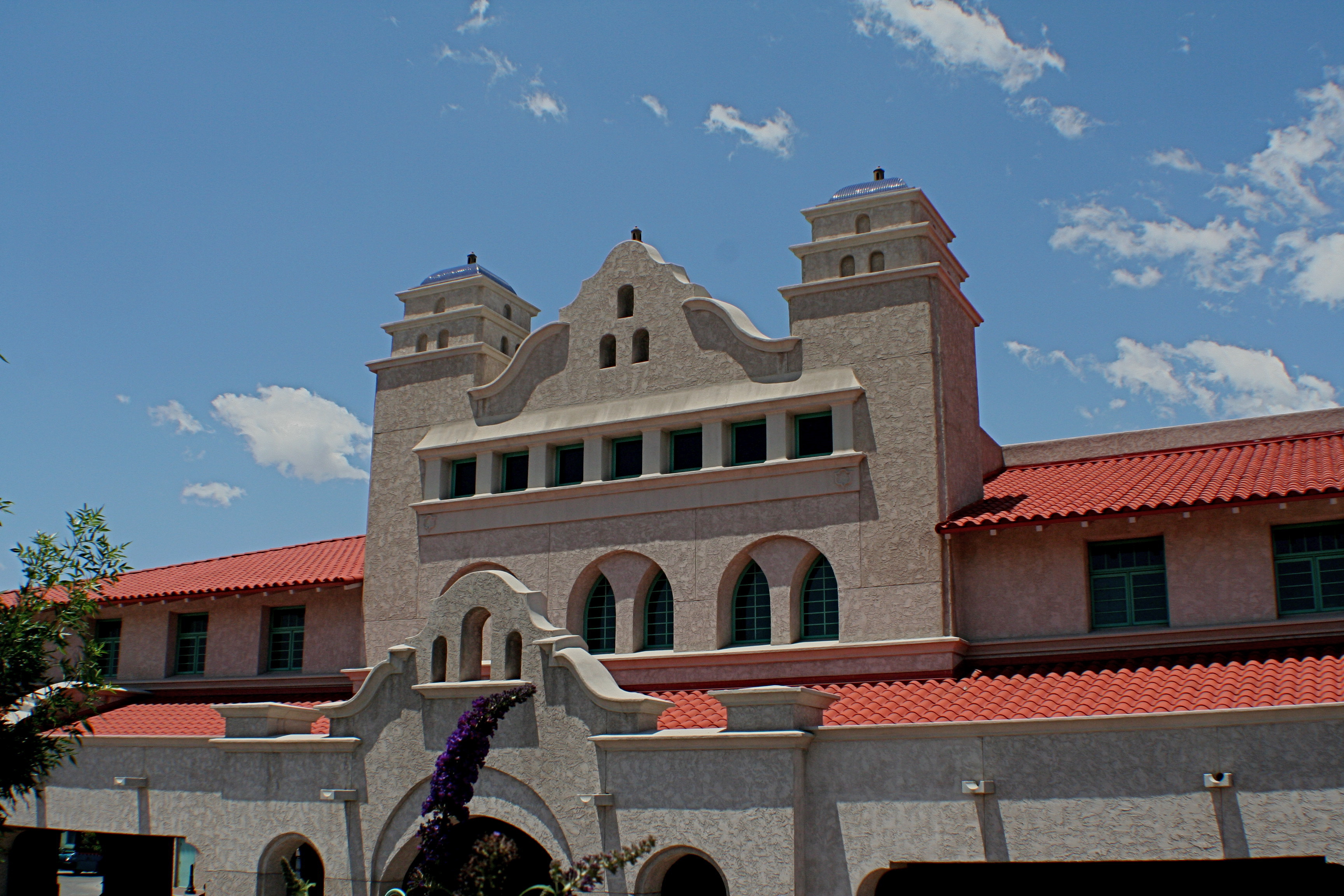
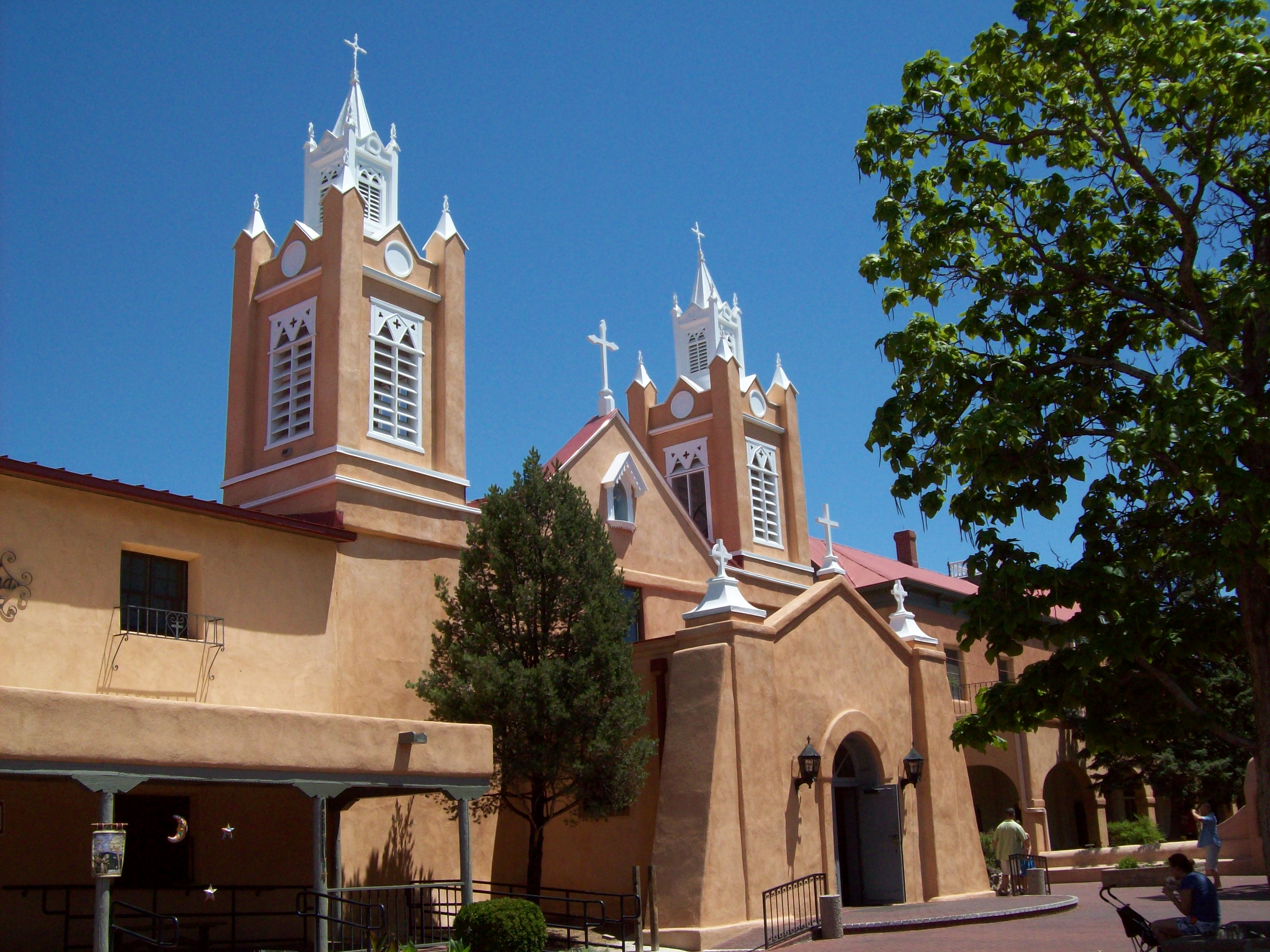
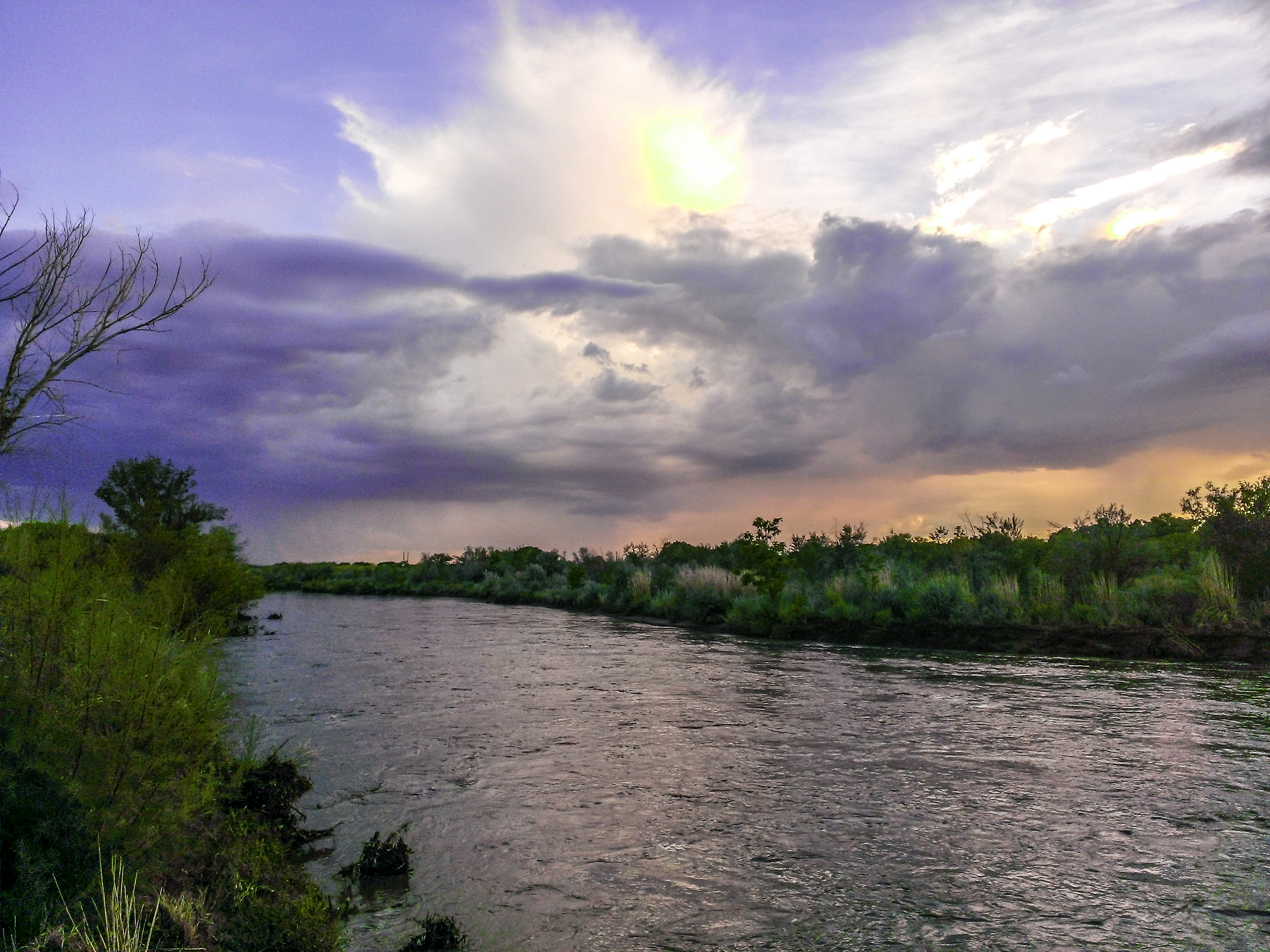
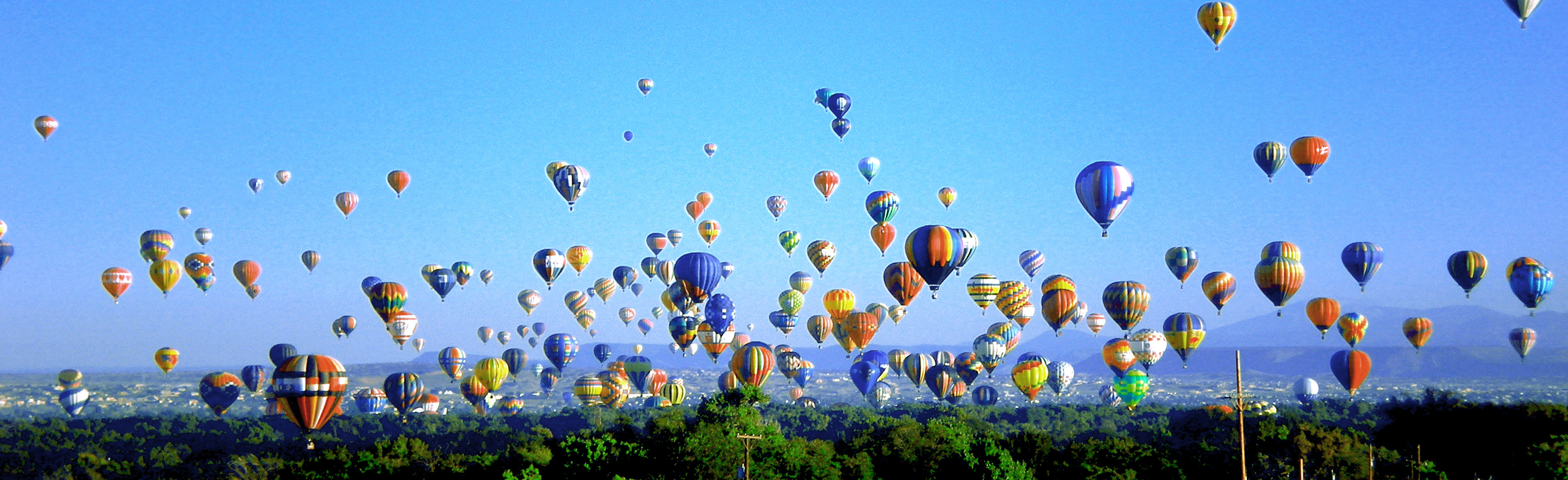
- Downtown Albuquerque Sandia Peak Tramway Alvarado Center San Felipe de Neri Church Rio Grande Albuquerque International Balloon Fiesta

- Flag Seal Wordmark
- Nicknames: The Duke City, ABQ, The 505, Burque, The Q.
- Interactive map of Albuquerque
- Location in New Mexico Location in the United States
- Coordinates: 35°5′4″N 106°39′6″W
- Country: United States
- State: New Mexico
- County: Bernalillo
- Metropolitan area: Albuquerque metropolitan area
- Founded: 1706 (as Alburquerque)
- Incorporated: 1891 (as Albuquerque)
- Founder: Francisco Cuervo y Valdés
- Named for: Francisco Fernández de la Cueva, 10th Duke of Alburquerque

Government
  - Type: Mayor–council government
  - Mayor: Tim Keller (D)

Area
  - City: 188.95 sq mi (489.39 km^{2})
  - Land: 187.66 sq mi (486.03 km^{2})
  - Water: 1.68 sq mi (4.35 km^{2})
- Elevation: 5,312 ft (1,619 m)

Population (2020)
  - City: 564,559
  - Estimate (2025): 556,588 ▼
  - Rank: 86th in North America; 32nd in the United States; 1st in New Mexico
  - Density: 3,014.7/sq mi (1,163.97/km^{2})
  - Urban: 769,837 (US: 59th)
  - Urban density: 2,926/sq mi (1,129.9/km^{2})
  - Metro: 960,000 (US: 61st)
  - CSA: 1,162,523
- Demonym(s): Albuquerquean (uncommon), Burqueño, Burqueña

GDP
  - Metro: $59.383 billion (2023)
  - Per capita: $61,857 (2023)
- Time zone: UTC−7 (MST)
  - Summer (DST): UTC−6 (MDT)
- ZIP Codes: 87101–87125, 87131, 87151, 87153, 87154, 87158, 87174, 87176, 87181, 87184, 87185, 87187, 87190–87199
- Area codes: 505
- FIPS code: 35-02000
- GNIS feature ID: 2409678
- Website: www.cabq.gov

Albuquerque (Note: /ˈælbəˌkɜːrki/ AL-bə-KURK-ee; Spanish: [alβuˈkeɾke] (Note: Also Spanish: Alburquerque, [alβuɾˈkeɾke], locally: [albʊ(ɹ)ˈkɛɹki]; Navajo: Beeʼeldííl Dahsinil, [peː˩ʔe˩ltiː˥l ta˩hsi˩ni˩l]; Eastern Keres: Arawageeki; Jemez: Vakêêke; Zuni: Alo:ke:k'ya; Jicarilla Apache: Gołgéeki'yé)) is the most populous city in the U.S. state of New Mexico. Founded in 1706 as La Villa de Alburquerque by Santa Fe de Nuevo México governor Francisco Cuervo y Valdés, and named in honor of Francisco Fernández de la Cueva, 10th Duke of Alburquerque and Viceroy of New Spain, it was an outpost on El Camino Real, linking Mexico City to the northernmost territories of New Spain. It is the county seat of Bernalillo County.

Located in the Albuquerque Basin, the city is flanked by the Sandia Mountains to the east and the West Mesa to the west, with the Rio Grande and its bosque flowing north-to-south through the middle. According to the 2020 census, Albuquerque had 564,559 residents, making it the 32nd most populous city in the U.S. and the fourth largest in the Southwest. The Albuquerque metropolitan area had 955,000 residents in 2023, and forms part of the Albuquerque–Santa Fe–Los Alamos combined statistical area, which had a population of 1,162,523.

Albuquerque is a hub for technology, fine arts, and mass media. It hosts New Mexico's primary international airport, Albuquerque International Sunport, and the state's flagship and largest university, the University of New Mexico. The U.S. federal government has a strong presence through Sandia National Laboratories, one of three laboratories of the National Nuclear Security Administration, and Kirtland Air Force Base, the largest installation in the Air Force Global Strike Command.

Nicknamed ABQ, Burque, and Duke City, Albuquerque is home to several historic landmarks, including over 160 sites listed on the National Register of Historic Places. Notable annual events include the Albuquerque International Balloon Fiesta, the largest balloon festival in the world, and the New Mexico State Fair. Albuquerque is also known for its restaurant scene, which features both New Mexican and global cuisine, and as a center of New Mexican music and architecture.

== History ==
=== Pre-colonial history ===
Petroglyphs carved into basalt in the western part of the city bear testimony to a Native American presence in the area dating back many centuries. These are preserved in the Petroglyph National Monument.

The Tanoan and Keresan peoples had lived along the Rio Grande for centuries before European colonists arrived in the area that developed as Albuquerque. By the 1500s, there were around 20 Tiwa pueblos along a 60-mile (97 km) stretch of river from present-day Algodones to the Rio Puerco confluence south of Belen. Of these, 12 or 13 were densely clustered near present-day Bernalillo, and the remainder were spread out to the south.

Two Tiwa pueblos lie on the outskirts of present-day Albuquerque. Both have been continuously inhabited for many centuries: Sandia Pueblo was founded in the 14th century, and Pueblo of Isleta is documented in written records since the early 17th century. It was then chosen as the site of the San Agustín de la Isleta Mission, a Catholic mission.

Before colonization, the Navajo, Apache, and Comanche peoples likely set up camps in the Albuquerque area, as there is evidence of trade and cultural exchange among these Native American groups dating back centuries before European arrival.

=== Colony of New Spain and Old Mexico Years ===
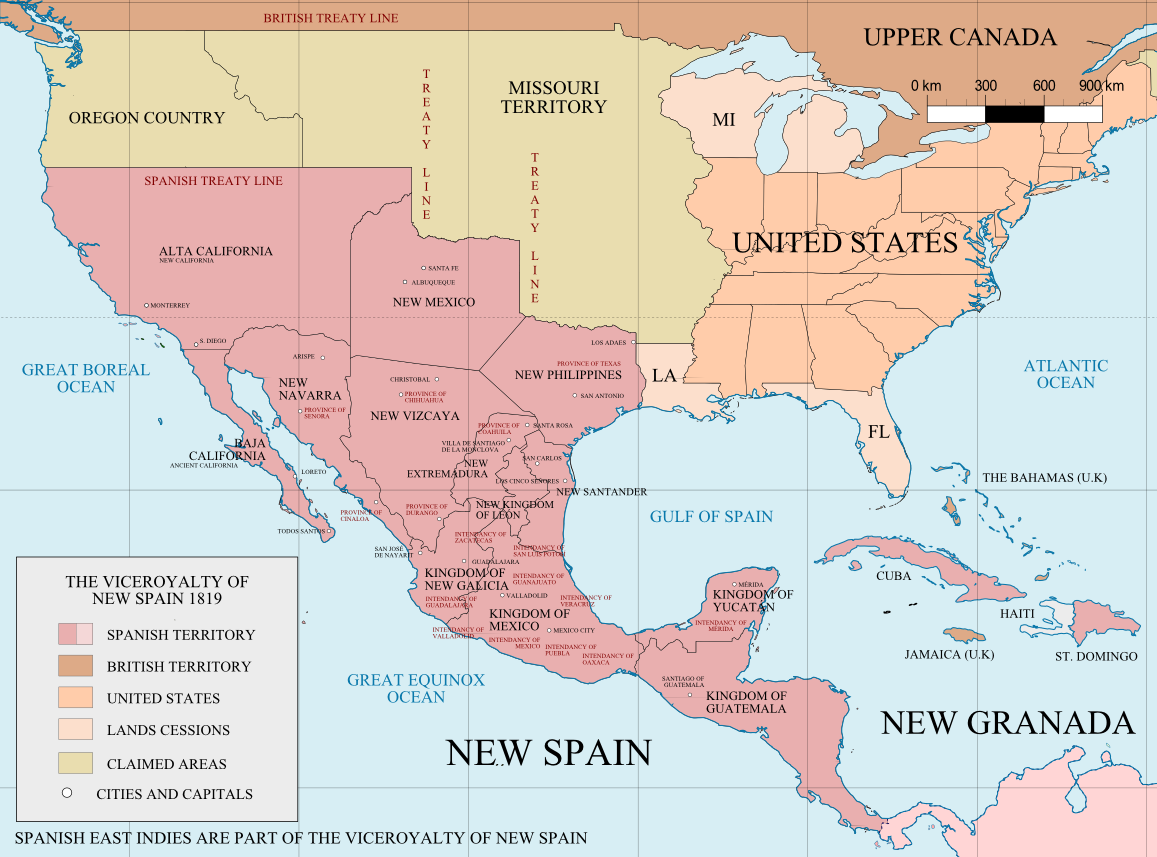
In 1706, Albuquerque was founded as a villa of Nuevo México, New Spain

Albuquerque was founded in 1706 as an outpost as La Villa de Alburquerque by Francisco Cuervo y Valdés in the province of Santa Fe de Nuevo México. The settlement was named after the original town of Viceroy Francisco Fernández de la Cueva, 10th duke of Alburquerque, who was from Alburquerque, Badajoz in southwest Spain.

Albuquerque developed primarily for farming and sheep herds. It was a strategically located trading and military outpost along the Camino Real. It served other Tiquex and Hispano towns settled in the area, such as Barelas, Corrales, Isleta Pueblo, Los Ranchos, and Sandia Pueblo.

After gaining independence in 1821, Mexico established a military presence here. The town of Alburquerque was built in the traditional Spanish villa pattern: a central plaza surrounded by government buildings, homes, and a church. This central plaza area has been preserved and is open to the public as a cultural area and center of commerce. It is referred to as "Old Town Albuquerque" or simply "Old Town". Historically it was sometimes referred to as "La Placita" (Little Plaza in Spanish). On the north side of Old Town Plaza is San Felipe de Neri Church. Built in 1793, it is one of the oldest surviving buildings in the city.

=== Incorporation into the US ===
After the New Mexico Territory became a part of the United States in the mid-19th century, a federal garrison and quartermaster depot, the Post of Albuquerque, were established here, operating from 1846 to 1867. In Beyond the Mississippi (1867), Albert D. Richardson, traveling to California via coach, passed through Albuquerque in late October 1859—its population was 3,000 at the time—and described it as "one of the richest and pleasantest towns, with a Spanish cathedral and other buildings more than two hundred years old."

During the Civil War, Albuquerque was occupied for a month in February 1862 by Confederate troops under General Henry Hopkins Sibley. He soon afterward advanced with his main body into northern New Mexico. During his retreat from Union troops into Texas, he made a stand on April 8, 1862, and fought the Battle of Albuquerque against a detachment of Union soldiers commanded by Colonel Edward R. S. Canby. This daylong engagement at long range led to few casualties. The residents of Albuquerque aided the Republican Union to rid the city of the occupying Confederate troops.

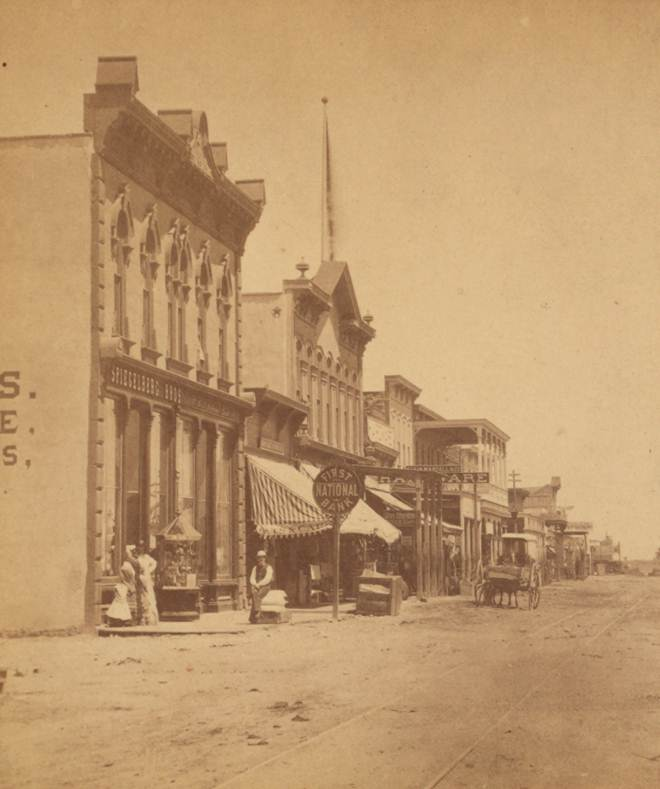
Downtown Albuquerque in the 1880s

When the Atchison, Topeka and Santa Fe Railroad arrived in 1880, it bypassed the Plaza, locating the passenger depot and railyards about 2 miles (3 km) east in what quickly became known as New Albuquerque or New Town. The railway company built a hospital for its workers that was later used as a juvenile psychiatric facility. It has since been converted to a hotel.

Many American merchants, mountain men, and settlers slowly filtered into Albuquerque, creating a major mercantile commercial center in Downtown Albuquerque. From this commercial center on July 4, 1882, Park Van Tassel became the first to fly a balloon in Albuquerque with a landing at Old Town. This was the first balloon flight in the New Mexico Territory.

Due to a rising rate of violent crime, gunman Milt Yarberry was appointed the town's first marshal that year. New Albuquerque was incorporated as a town in 1885, with Henry N. Jaffa its first mayor. It was incorporated as a city in 1891.

Old Albuquerque High School, the city's first public high school, was established in 1879. Congregation Albert, a Reform synagogue established in 1897, by Henry N. Jaffa, who was also the city's first mayor, is the oldest continuing Jewish organization in the city.

=== 20th Century and Present ===
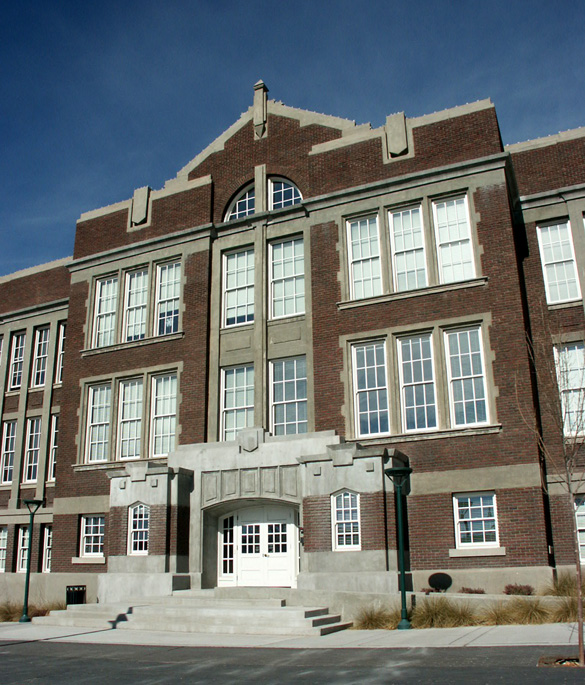
Old Albuquerque High, built in 1914. Victorian and Gothic styles were used in the late 19th and early 20th centuries.

Old Town remained a separate community until the 1920s, when it was absorbed by Albuquerque. By 1900, Albuquerque boasted a population of 8,000 and all the modern amenities, including an electric street railway connecting Old Town, New Town, and the recently established University of New Mexico campus on the East Mesa. In 1902, the Alvarado Hotel was built adjacent to the new passenger depot, and it remained a famous symbol of the city for decades. Outdated, it was razed in 1970 and the site was converted to a parking lot.

In 2002, the Alvarado Transportation Center was built on the site in a style resembling the old landmark. The large metro station functions as the downtown headquarters for the city's transit department. It also is an intermodal hub for local buses, Greyhound buses, Amtrak passenger trains, and the Rail Runner commuter rail line.

In the early days of transcontinental air service, Albuquerque was an important stop on many transcontinental air routes, earning it the nickname "Crossroads of the Southwest".

During the early 20th century, New Mexico's dry climate attracted many tuberculosis patients to the city in search of a cure; this was before penicillin was found to be effective. Several sanitaria were developed on the West Mesa for TB patients. Presbyterian Hospital and St. Joseph Hospital, two of the largest hospitals in the Southwest, had their beginnings during this period. Influential New Deal–era governor Clyde Tingley and famed Southwestern architect John Gaw Meem were among those who came to New Mexico seeking recovery from TB.

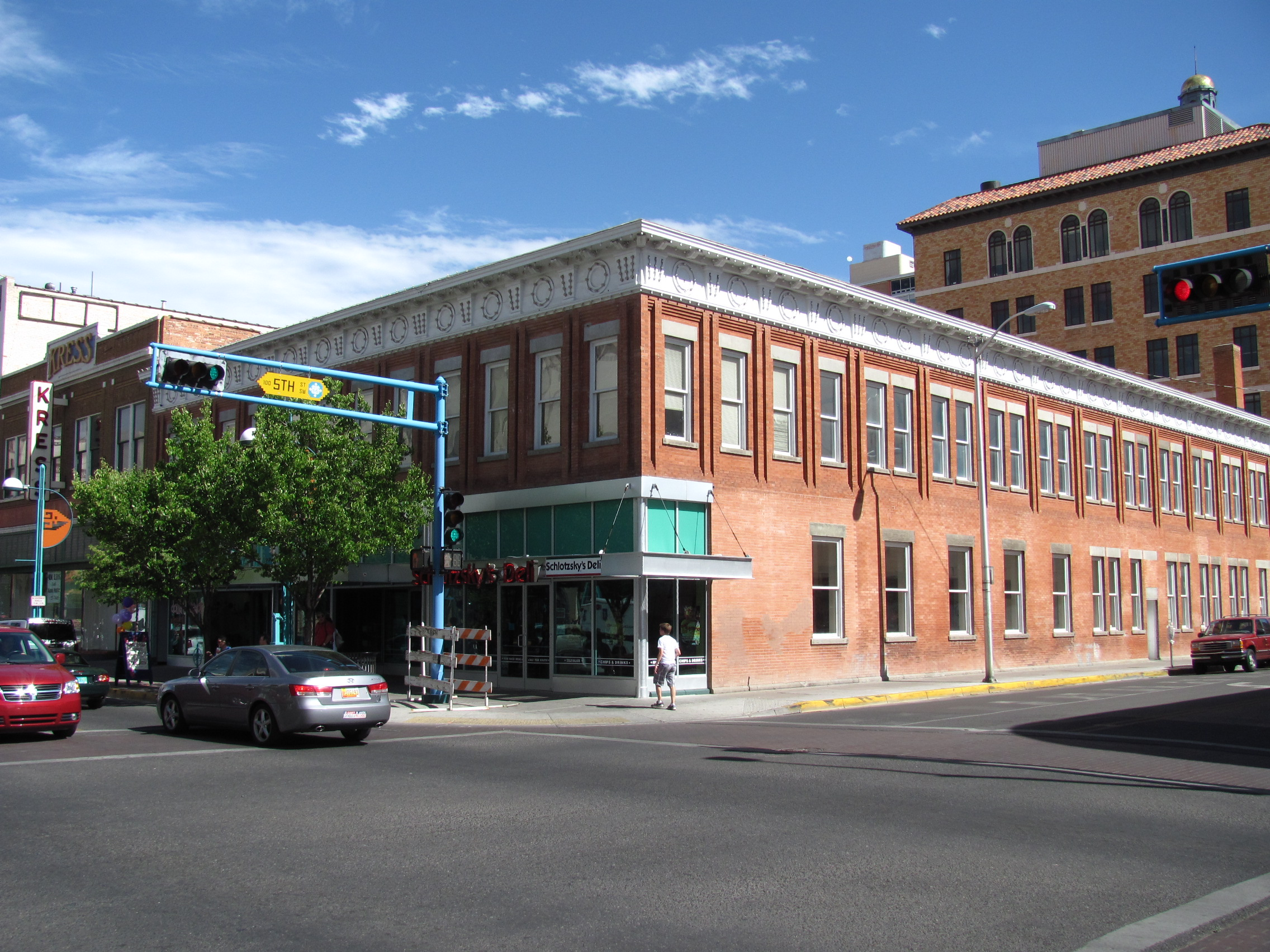
The McCanna–Hubbell Building, built in 1915, is one of downtown Albuquerque's many historic buildings

The first travelers on Route 66 appeared in Albuquerque in 1926. Soon dozens of motels, restaurants, and gift shops sprouted along the roadside. Route 66 originally ran through the city on a north–south alignment along Fourth Street. In 1937 it was realigned along Central Avenue, a more direct east–west route. The intersection of Fourth and Central downtown was the principal crossroads of the city for decades. The majority of the surviving structures from the Route 66 era are on Central, though there are also some on Fourth. Signs between Bernalillo and Los Lunas along the old route now have brown, historical highway markers denoting it as Pre-1937 Route 66.

The establishment of Kirtland Air Force Base in 1939, Sandia Base in the early 1940s, and Sandia National Laboratories in 1949, would make Albuquerque a key player of the Atomic Age. Meanwhile, the city continued to expand outward into the Northeast Heights, reaching a population of 201,189 by 1960 per the U.S. Census.

By 1990, it was 384,736 and in 2007 it was 518,271. In June 2007, Albuquerque was listed as the sixth fastest-growing city in the United States. In 1990, the U.S. Census Bureau reported Albuquerque's population as 34.5% Hispanic and 58.3% non-Hispanic white.

On April 11, 1950, a USAF B-29 bomber carrying a nuclear weapon crashed into a mountain near Manzano Base. On May 22, 1957, a B-36 accidentally dropped a Mark 17 nuclear bomb 4.5 miles from the control tower while landing at Kirtland Air Force Base. Only the conventional trigger detonated, as the bomb was unarmed. These incidents were not reported as they were classified as secret for decades.

Following the end of World War II, population shifts as well as suburban development, urban sprawl and gentrification, Albuquerque's downtown entered a period of decline. Many historic buildings were razed in the 1960s and 1970s to make way for new plazas, high-rises, and parking lots as part of the city's urban renewal phase. As of 2010, only recently has Downtown Albuquerque come to regain much of its urban character, mainly through the construction of many new loft apartment buildings and the renovation of historic structures such as the KiMo Theater.

During the 21st century, Albuquerque's population has continued to grow rapidly. The population of the city proper was estimated at 448,607 in the 2000 census, 528,497 in 2009, and 564,559 in 2020 census. During 2005 and 2006, the city celebrated its tricentennial with a diverse program of cultural events.

The passage of the Planned Growth Strategy in 2002–2004 was the community's strongest effort to create a framework for a more balanced and sustainable approach to urban growth.

Urban sprawl is limited on three sides—by the Sandia Pueblo to the north, the Isleta Pueblo and Kirtland Air Force Base to the south, and the Sandia Mountains to the east. Suburban growth continues at a strong pace to the west, beyond the Petroglyph National Monument, once thought to be a natural boundary to sprawl development.

Because of less-costly land and lower taxes, much of the growth in the metropolitan area is taking place outside of the city of Albuquerque itself. In Rio Rancho to the northwest, the communities east of the mountains, and the incorporated parts of Valencia County, population growth rates approach twice that of Albuquerque. The primary cities in Valencia County are Los Lunas and Belen, both of which are home to growing industrial complexes and new residential subdivisions. The mountain towns of Tijeras, Edgewood, and Moriarty, while close enough to Albuquerque to be considered suburbs, have experienced much less growth compared to Rio Rancho, Bernalillo, Los Lunas, and Belen. Limited water supply and rugged terrain are the main limiting factors for development in these towns. The Mid Region Council of Governments (MRCOG), which includes constituents from throughout the Albuquerque area, was formed to ensure that these governments along the middle Rio Grande would be able to meet the needs of their rapidly rising populations. MRCOG's cornerstone project is currently the New Mexico Rail Runner Express.

== Geography ==
Satellite view of Albuquerque taken in May 2023

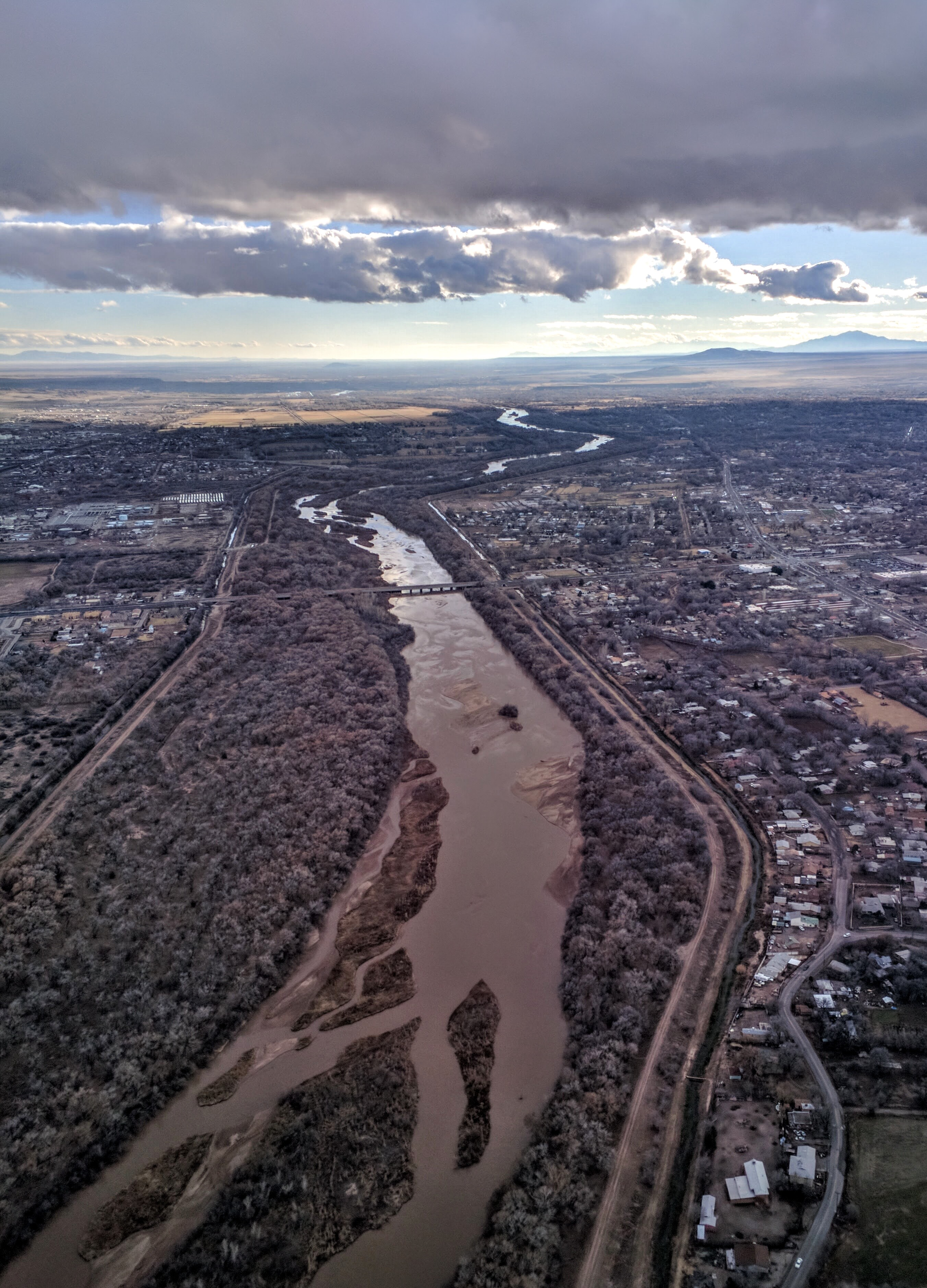
Aerial view of the Rio Grande flowing through Albuquerque in 2016

Albuquerque is located in north-central New Mexico. To its east are the Sandia–Manzano Mountains. The Rio Grande flows north to south through its center, while the West Mesa and Petroglyph National Monument make up the western part of the city. Albuquerque has one of the highest elevations of any major city in the U.S., ranging from 4,900 feet (1,500 m) above sea level near the Rio Grande to over 6,700 feet (2,000 m) in the foothill areas of Sandia Heights and Glenwood Hills. The civic apex is found in an undeveloped area within the Albuquerque Open Space; there, the terrain rises to an elevation of approximately 6,880 feet (2,100 m), and the metropolitan area's highest point is Sandia Crest at an altitude of 10,678 feet (3,255 m).

According to the United States Census Bureau, Albuquerque has a total area of 189.5 square miles (490.9 km^{2}), of which 187.7 square miles (486.2 km^{2}) is land and 1.8 square miles (4.7 km^{2}), or 0.96%, is water.

Albuquerque lies within the fertile Rio Grande Valley with its Bosque forest, in the center of the Albuquerque Basin, flanked on the eastern side by the Sandia Mountains and to the west by the West Mesa. Located in central New Mexico, the city also has noticeable influences from the adjacent Colorado Plateau semi-desert, New Mexico Mountains forested with juniper and pine, and Southwest plateaus and plains steppe ecoregions, depending on where one is located.

=== Landforms and drainage ===
Albuquerque has one of the highest and most varied elevations of any major city in the United States, though the effects of this are greatly tempered by its southwesterly continental position. The elevation of the city ranges from 4,949 feet (1,508 m) above sea level near the Rio Grande (in the Valley) to 6,165 feet (1,879 m) in the foothill areas of Sandia Heights. At the Albuquerque International Sunport, the elevation is 5,355 feet (1,632 m) above sea level.

The Rio Grande is classified, like the Nile, as an "exotic" river. The New Mexico portion of the Rio Grande lies within the Rio Grande Rift Valley, bordered by a system of faults, including those that lifted up the adjacent Sandia and Manzano Mountains, while lowering the area where the life-sustaining Rio Grande now flows.

=== Geology and ecology ===
Albuquerque lies in the Albuquerque Basin, a portion of the Rio Grande rift. The Sandia Mountains are the predominant geographic feature visible in Albuquerque. Sandía is Spanish for "watermelon", and is popularly believed to be a reference to the brilliant pink and green coloration of the mountains at sunset. The pink is due to large exposures of granodiorite cliffs, and the green is due to large swaths of conifer forests. However, Robert Julyan notes in The Place Names of New Mexico, "the most likely explanation is the one believed by the Sandia Pueblo Indians: the Spaniards, when they encountered the Pueblo in 1540, called it Sandia, because they thought the squash growing there were watermelons, and the name Sandia soon was transferred to the mountains east of the pueblo." He also notes that the Sandia Pueblo Indians call the mountain Bien Mur, "Big Mountain."

Albuquerque lies at the northern edge of the Chihuahuan Desert transitioning into the Colorado Plateau. The Sandia Mountains represent the northern edge of the Arizona/New Mexico Mountains ecoregion.

The environments of Albuquerque include the Rio Grande bosque, (floodplain cottonwood forest), arid scrub, and mesas that turn into the Sandia foothills in the east. The Rio Grande's bosque has been significantly reduced and its natural flood cycle disrupted by dams built further upstream. A corridor of bosque surrounding the river within the city has been preserved as Rio Grande Valley State Park.

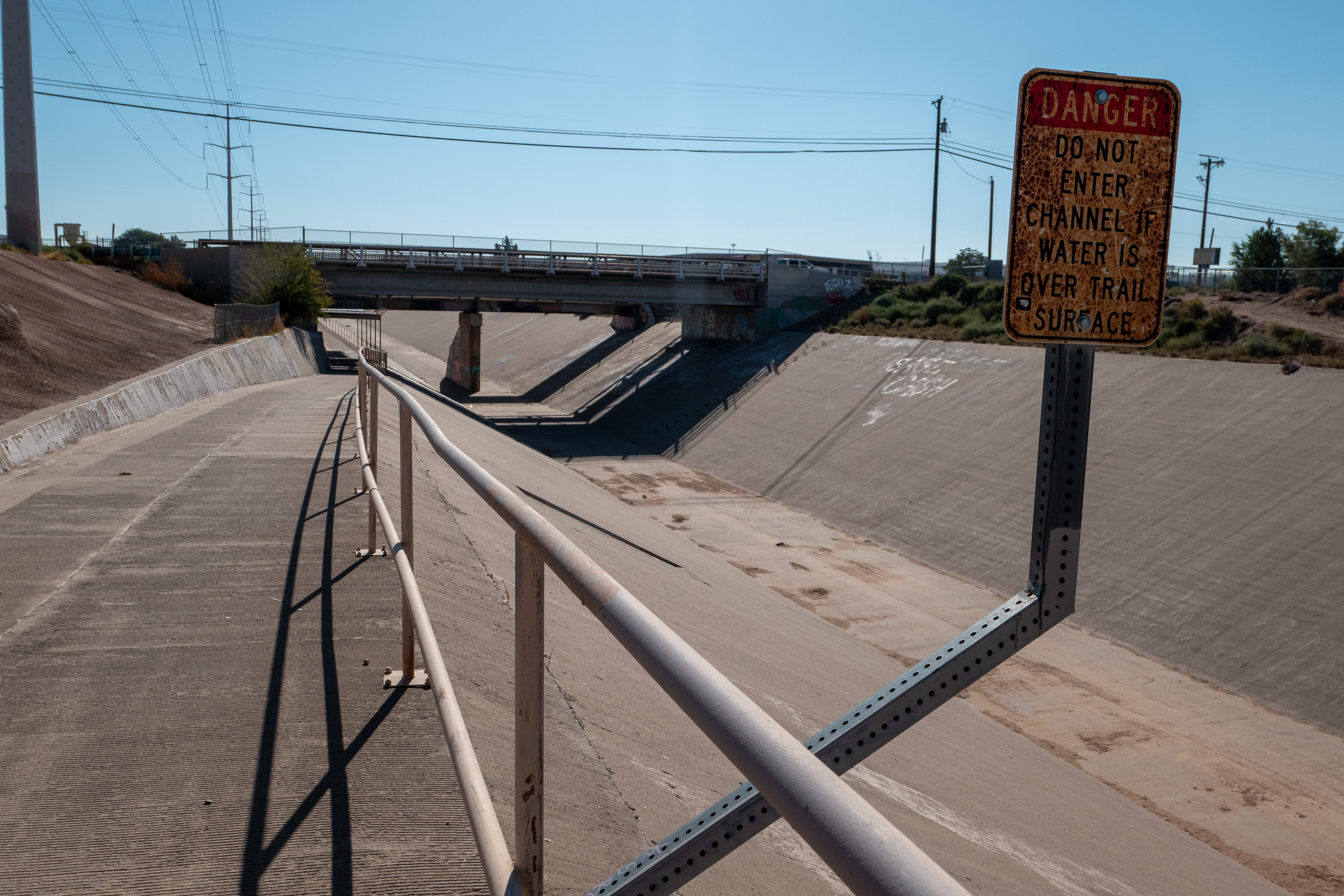
The South Diversion Channel

A few remaining natural arroyos provide riparian habitat within the city, though natural arroyos draining into the Rio Grande have largely been replaced with concrete channels. After a series of floods in the 1950s, passage of the "Arroyo Flood Control Act of 1963" provided for the construction of a series of concrete diversion channels. The network of channels was built by the Army Corps of Engineers during the 1960s and early 1970s.

Iconic urban wildlife includes the roadrunner, Gunnison's prairie dog, coyote, and New Mexico whiptail lizard. The bosque is a popular destination for wildlife viewing, with opportunities to see porcupines and sandhill cranes in the winter. Cooper's hawks are common in city parks.

Iconic vegetation in town varies by the terrain and soil type; in much of Albuquerque that includes the Rio Grande cottonwood, Gooding's and coyote willow, Arizona walnut, and alkali sacaton in the bosque; on the edges of the Rio Grande floodplain some remaining New Mexico olive, screwbean mesquite, and lead plant occur. tree cholla, various prickly pear and yucca, chamisa, and oneseed juniper occur in upland areas as part of the desert grassland plant community, within a cover of arid grasses including black grama and purple three awn, mostly east of I-25 and above the west mesa's volcanic escarpment. West of the Rio Grande but below the escarpment, the mesa sand scrub plant community includes sand sagebrush, broom dalea, fourwing saltbush, and sandy soil-adapted grasses including various dropseed and indian ricegrass; some stands of mariola, beebrush, threeleaf sumac, littleleaf sumac, and blackspine prickly pear grow along or near the volcanic escarpment. The foothill open space at the eastern border of the city limits also features Sonoran scrub oak, with gray oak and some Colorado piñon trees in more mesic locations. Desert willow is a native tree along some arroyos, and they are now commonly planted throughout the city; western honey mesquite and netleaf hackberry occur in small numbers beyond developed areas, as do remaining stands of creosote bush on the southern edge of the city. Tumbleweeds are a common weed in disturbed areas, and are used by Albuquerque's flood control authority, to make an annual holiday snowman adjacent to their headquarters building, near the "Big-I" interchange near the city's center.

=== Cityscape ===
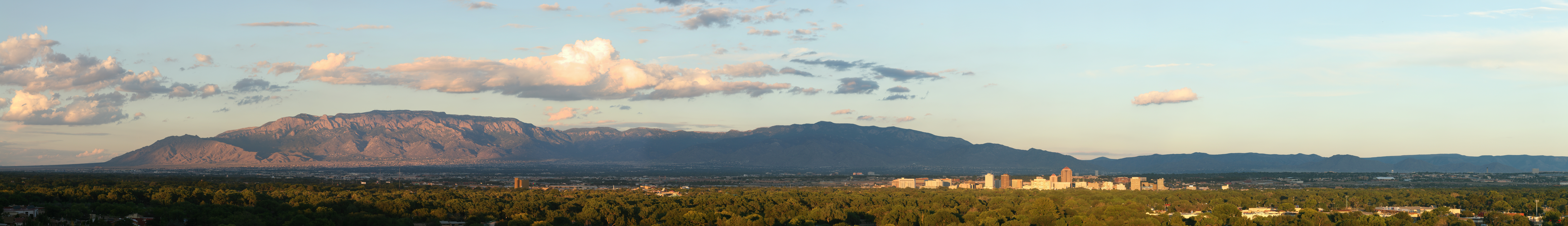
Panoramic view of the city of Albuquerque looking east
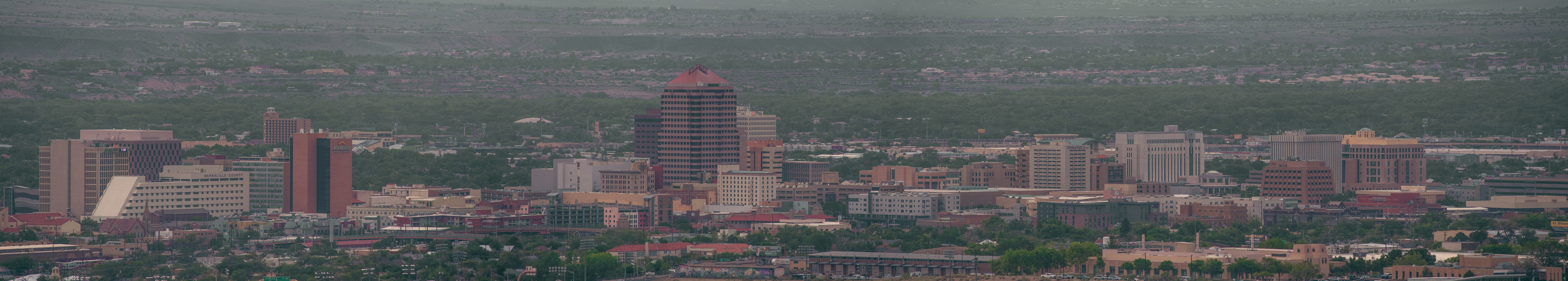
Panoramic view of downtown Albuquerque in May 2025

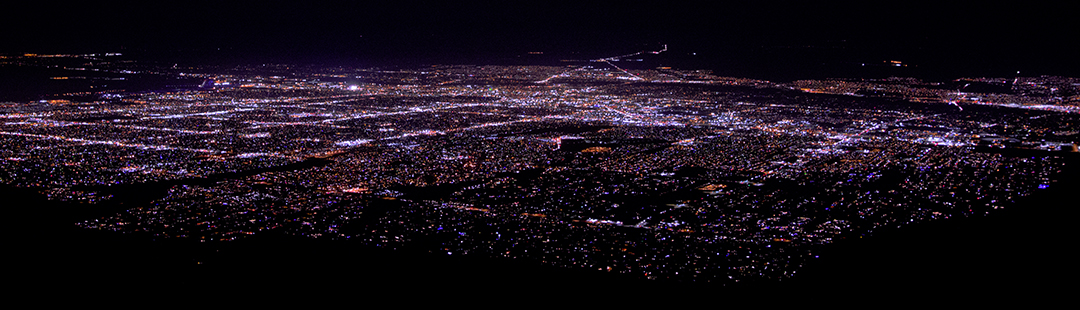
Nocturnal view of Albuquerque from Sandia Peak Tramway upper terminal

==== Quadrants ====
Albuquerque is geographically divided into four unequal quadrants that are officially part of mailing addresses, placed immediately after the street name. They are Northeast (NE), Northwest (NW), Southeast (SE), and Southwest (SW). Albuquerque's official quadrant system uses Central Ave for the north–south division and the railroad tracks for the east–west division. I-25 and I-40 are also sometimes used informally to divide the city into quadrants.

===== Northeast =====
This quadrant has been experiencing a housing expansion since the late 1950s. It abuts the base of the Sandia Mountains and contains portions of the foothills neighborhoods, which are significantly higher in elevation than the rest of the city. Running from Central Ave and the Railrunner tracks to the Sandia Peak Aerial Tram, this is the largest quadrant both geographically and by population. Martineztown, the Maxwell Museum of Anthropology, University of New Mexico, the Uptown area, which includes three shopping malls (Coronado Center, ABQ Uptown, and Winrock Town Center), Hoffmantown, Journal Center, and Cliff's Amusement Park are all in this quadrant.

Some of the most affluent neighborhoods in the city are here, including: High Desert, Tanoan, Sandia Heights, and North Albuquerque Acres. Parts of Sandia Heights and North Albuquerque Acres are outside the city limits proper. A few houses in the farthest reach of this quadrant lie in the Cibola National Forest, just over the line into Sandoval County.

===== Northwest =====
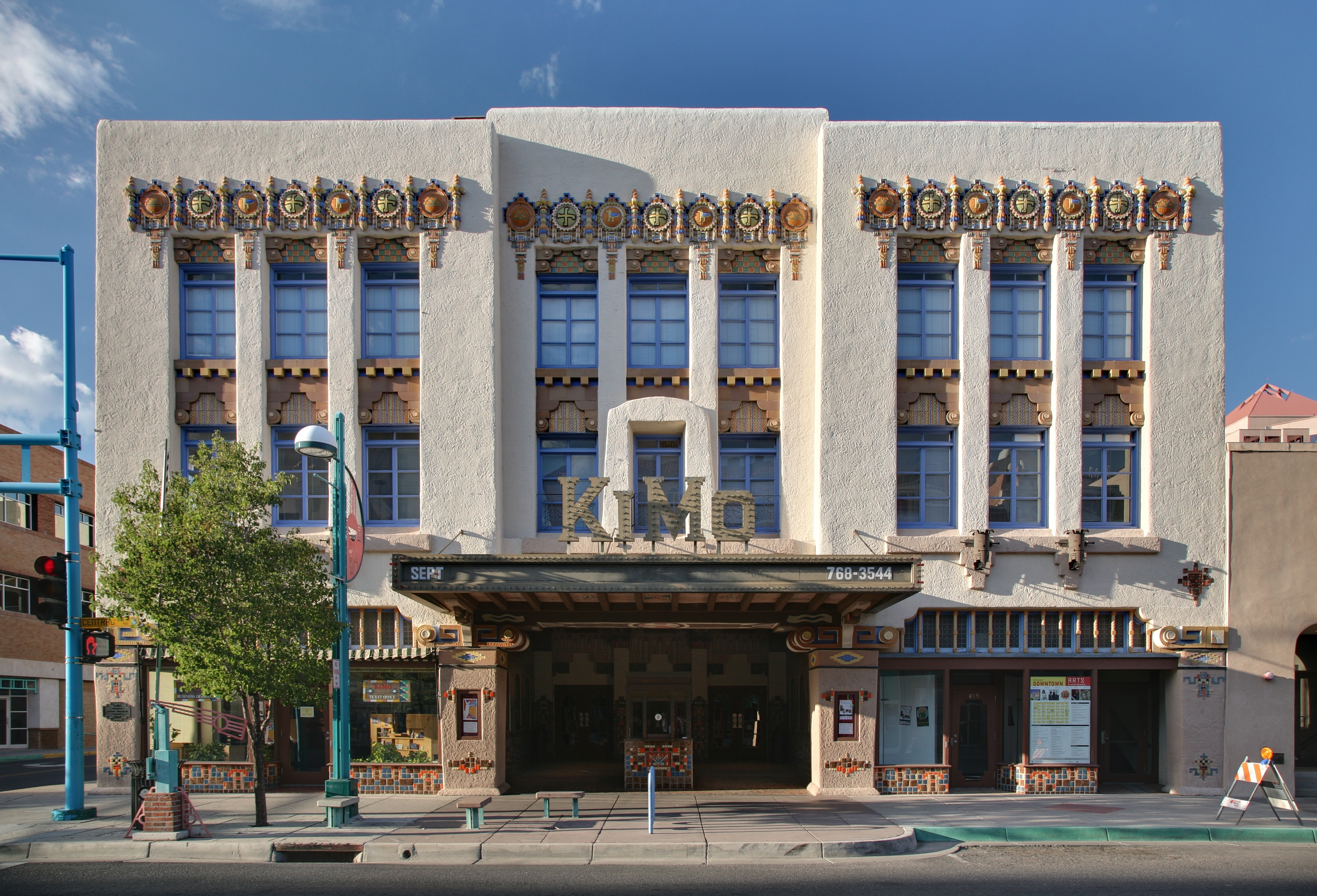
KiMo Theatre in Downtown

This quadrant contains historic Old Town Albuquerque, which dates to the 18th century, as well as the Indian Pueblo Cultural Center. The area has a mixture of commercial districts and low to high-income neighborhoods. Northwest Albuquerque includes the largest section of Downtown, Rio Grande Nature Center State Park and the Bosque ("woodlands"), Petroglyph National Monument, Double Eagle II Airport, the Paradise Hills neighborhood, Taylor Ranch, and Cottonwood Mall.

This quadrant also contains the North Valley settlement, outside the city limits, which has some expensive homes and small ranches along the Rio Grande. The city of Albuquerque engulfs the village of Los Ranchos de Albuquerque. A small portion of the rapidly developing area on the west side of the river south of the Petroglyphs, known as the "West Mesa" or "Westside", consisting primarily of traditional residential subdivisions, also extends into this quadrant. The city proper is bordered on the north by the North Valley, the village of Corrales, and the city of Rio Rancho.

===== Southeast =====
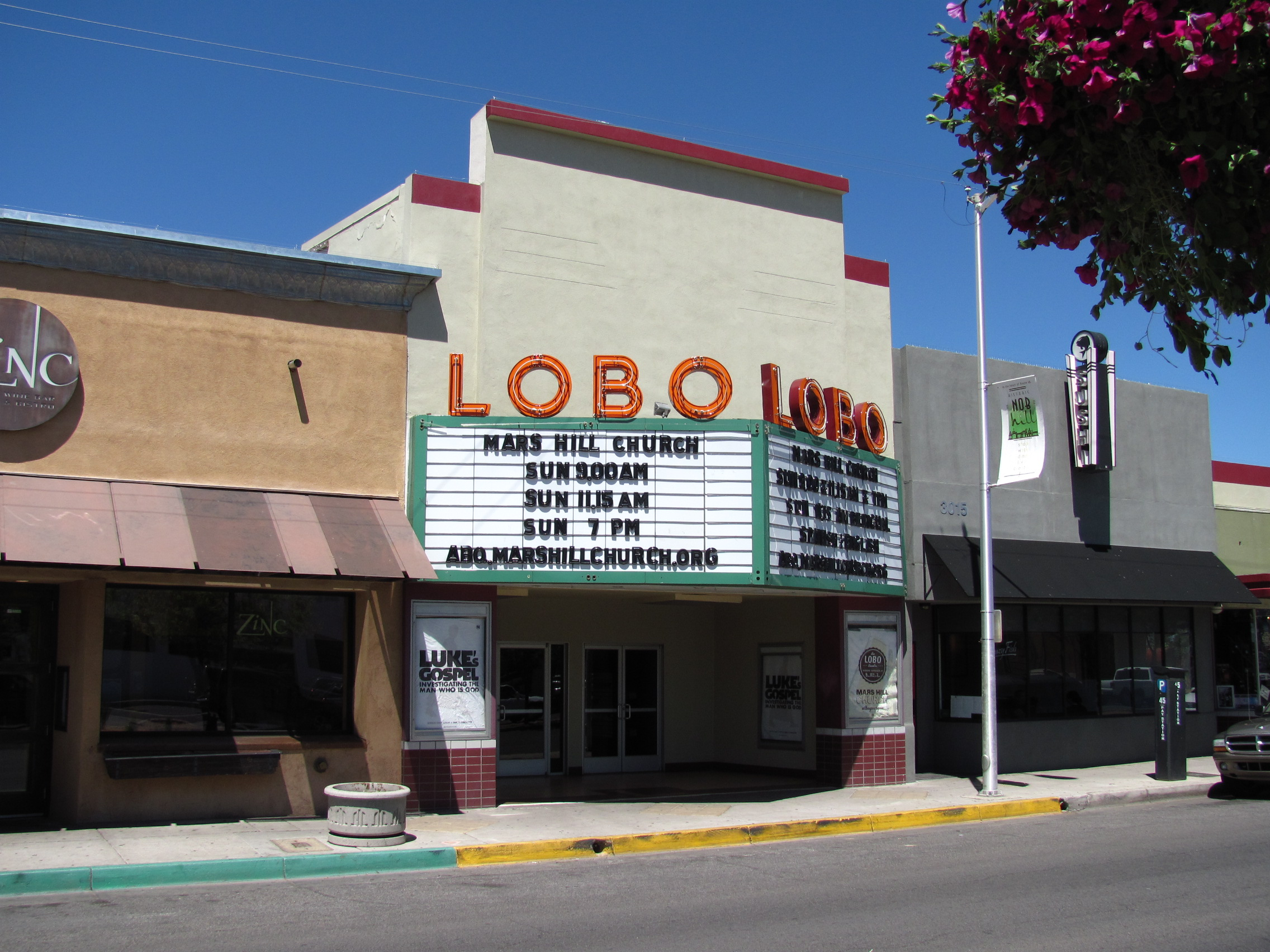
Lobo Theater in Nob Hill

Kirtland Air Force Base, Sandia National Laboratories, Sandia Science & Technology Park, MaxQ@Kirtland, Albuquerque International Sunport, American Society of Radiologic Technologists, Central New Mexico Community College, UNM South Campus, Presbyterian Hospital, VA Medical Center, Duke City BMX, University Stadium, Isotopes Park, The Pit, Mesa del Sol, Isleta Amphitheater, Netflix Studios, Pacific Fusion, Isleta Resort & Casino, National Museum of Nuclear Science & History, New Mexico Veterans Memorial, and Talin Market are all located in the Southeast quadrant of Albuquerque.

The Four Hills neighborhood is located in the foothills of Southeast Albuquerque. The Volterra subdivision lies west of Four Hills.

Popular urban neighborhoods that can be found in Southeast Albuquerque include Nob Hill, Ridgecrest, Parkland Hills, Hyder Park, and University Heights.

===== Southwest =====
Traditionally consisting of agricultural and rural areas and suburban neighborhoods, the Southwest quadrant comprises the south-end of Downtown Albuquerque, the Barelas neighborhood, the rapidly growing west side, and the community of South Valley, New Mexico, often called "The South Valley". The quadrant extends all the way to the Isleta Indian Reservation. Newer suburban subdivisions on the West Mesa near the southwestern city limits join homes of older construction, some dating as far back as the 1940s. This quadrant includes the old communities of Atrisco, Los Padillas, Huning Castle, Kinney, Westgate, Westside, Alamosa, Mountainview, and Pajarito. The Bosque ("woodlands"), the National Hispanic Cultural Center, the Rio Grande Zoo, and Tingley Beach are also here.

A new adopted development plan, the Santolina Master Plan, will extend development on the west side past 118th Street SW to the edge of the Rio Puerco Valley and house 100,000 by 2050.

=== Climate ===
Climate chart for Albuquerque

Albuquerque's climate is classified as a cold semi-arid climate (BSk) according to the Köppen climate classification system, while the Biota of North America Program and the U.S. Geological Survey describe it as warm temperate semi-desert.

Albuquerque is located near the crossroads of several ecoregions. According to the U.S. Environmental Protection Agency, the city is located in the southeastern edge of the Arizona/New Mexico Plateau, with the Arizona/New Mexico Mountains ecoregion defining the adjacent Sandia-Manzano mountains, including the foothills in the eastern edges of the city limits, above Juan Tabo Boulevard. Though the city lies at the northern edge of the Chihuahuan Desert transitioning into the Colorado Plateau, much of Albuquerque's area west of the Sandia Mountains shares similar temperatures, aridity, yearly precipitation patterns, and natural vegetation with the Chihuahuan Desert, namely the desert grassland and sand scrub plant communities.

The eastern portion of the greater Albuquerque area is known as the East Mountain area, outside Albuquerque but it is within the Southwestern Tablelands, sometimes considered a southern extension of the central high plains or northeast New Mexico highlands. To the north is the Southern Rockies ecoregion in the Jemez Mountains.

The average annual precipitation is less than half of evaporation supporting an arid climate (BWk), according to a more recent application of the Köppen climate classification system using over a century of climatology, with no month's daily mean temperature averaging below freezing. The climate is mild compared to many parts of the continent farther north or east, protected by mountains and surrounding highlands. However, due to the city's high elevation, low temperatures in winter often dip below freezing. Varied terrain and elevations within the city and outlying areas cause daily temperature differentials to vary. The daily mean temperatures in December and January, the coldest months, are above freezing at 36.9 °F (2.7 °C) at the 1,620 metres (5,310 feet) elevation Albuquerque International Airport station, representative of much of the city, and 35.2 °F (1.8 °C) at the 1,827 metres (5,994 feet) elevation Albuquerque Foothills NE station.

Albuquerque's climate is usually sunny and dry, with an average of 3,415 sunshine hours per year. Brilliant sunshine defines the region, averaging 278 days a year; periods of variably mid and high-level cloudiness temper the sun, mostly during the cooler months. Extended cloudiness lasting longer than two or three days is rare.

Temperatures, precipitation, and wind vary across the city and environs, as a function of the location and elevation.

Winter typically consists of cool days and cold nights, except following passage of the strongest cold fronts and arctic airmasses when daytime temperatures remain colder than average; overnight temperatures tend to fall below freezing between about 12 am and 9 am in the city, except during colder airmasses, plus colder spots of the valley and most of the East Mountain areas outside Albuquerque. December, the coolest month, averages 36.9 °F (2.7 °C); the median or normal coolest temperature of the year is 12 °F (−11 °C), while the average or mean is about 11 °F (−12 °C). It is typical for daily low temperatures in much of December to mid-February to be below freezing, with a long-term average of 93-126 days per year falling to or below freezing, and 1-5 days failing to rise above freezing. Winter is the second driest season in much of Albuquerque, and while rain makes up more of the season's precipitation than snow, December is the snowiest month on average

Spring begins by March, with stronger winds occurring on many afternoons, as temperatures warm with the change to spring weather patterns and storm systems pass to the north. Spring can occasionally bring unsettled weather with rain or even light accumulations of snowfall, into early April, though spring is often the driest part of the year in Albuquerque. Late March and April tend to experience many days with the wind blowing at 20 to 30 mph (32 to 48 km/h), and afternoon gusts can produce periods of blowing sand and dust. In May, the winds tend to subside as a summer-like airmass begins to occur, with a regularity of higher temperatures. The warming and drying trend continues into June by mid-June, temperatures can exceed 100 °F (38 °C) for a brief period.

Summer is lengthy and very warm to hot, but except for midday through evening, they are tolerable because of low humidity and air movement. The exception is usually during the monsoon season, from July to early September, when the dewpoint and relative humidity remain higher. 1-11 days of 100 °F (38 °C) or warmer highs occur annually on average, mostly in June and July and rarely in August due in part to the monsoon; an average of 64-91 days experience 90 °F (32 °C) or warmer highs. Despite the rarity of such heat, 28 days with highs at or above 100 °F (38 °C) occurred in the summer of 1980 at Albuquerque's Sunport. In mid-September, the monsoon begins to weaken. Many valley and West Mesa locations experience more high temperatures above 90 °F (32 °C) and 100 °F (38 °C) during the summer.

Autumn is generally cool in the mornings and nights but sees less rain than summer, though the weather can be more unsettled, as colder airmasses and weather patterns build in from the north with more frequency. Some years, a storm in November may cause a snow accumulation of one to two inches.

Precipitation averages 8.84 inches (225 mm) per year. On average, January is the driest month, while July and August are the wettest months, as a result of shower and thunderstorm activity produced by the monsoon prevalent over the Southwestern United States. Most rain occurs during the late summer monsoon season, typically starting in mid-June and ending in mid-September.

Albuquerque averages 7.9 inches (20 cm) of snow per winter, and experiences several accumulating snow events each season. Locations in the Northeast Heights and foothills tend to receive more snowfall due to each region's higher elevation and proximity to the mountains. East Mountain communities outside Albuquerque average more snow, and at times, not usually experienced in the city. The metro area was one of several in the region experiencing a severe winter storm on December 28–30, 2006, with locations in the Albuquerque area receiving between 10.5 and 26 inches (27 and 66 cm) of snow. More recently, a major winter storm in late February 2015 dropped up to a foot (30 cm) of snow on most of the city. Such large snowfalls are rare occurrences during the period of record, and they greatly impact traffic movement and the workforce due to their rarity.

The mountains and highlands east of the city create a rain shadow effect from moist Gulf airmasses moving towards the area, due to the drying of air descending the west side of the mountains into much of Albuquerque; the Sandia Mountains tend to lift any available moisture, enhancing precipitation to about 10–17 inches (254–432 mm) annually. Traveling west, north, and east of Albuquerque, one quickly rises in elevation, leaving the sheltering effect of the valley to enter a noticeably cooler and slightly wetter environment. One such area is considered part of Albuquerque Metropolitan Area, commonly called the East Mountain area, is covered in woodlands of juniper and piñon trees, a common trait of southwestern uplands and the southern Rocky Mountains.

Albuquerque's growing season averages 208 days, which is the total consecutive days of low temperature above 32 °F (0 °C) between the last spring freeze and first fall freeze, based on 1991 to 2020 climatology at the Sunport. The growing season can vary depending on local terrain or the year, and is shorter in colder locales of the valley, foothills, and especially the East Mountains; Sandia Park averages a growing season of 152 days.

Climate data for Albuquerque (Albuquerque International Sunport), 1991–2020 normals, (Note: Mean monthly maxima and minima (i.e. the expected highest and lowest temperature readings at any point during the year or given month) calculated based on data at said location from 1991 to 2020.) extremes 1891–present (Note: Official records for Albuquerque kept December 1891 to January 22, 1933, at the Weather Bureau Office and at Albuquerque Int'l since January 23, 1933. For more information, see Threadex)
Month	Jan	Feb	Mar	Apr	May	Jun	Jul	Aug	Sep	Oct	Nov	Dec	Year
Record high °F (°C)	72 (22)	79 (26)	91 (33)	89 (32)	98 (37)	107 (42)	105 (41)	102 (39)	100 (38)	91 (33)	83 (28)	72 (22)	107 (42)
Mean maximum °F (°C)	60.9 (16.1)	67.5 (19.7)	76.8 (24.9)	83.2 (28.4)	91.2 (32.9)	99.3 (37.4)	99.4 (37.4)	96.1 (35.6)	91.7 (33.2)	83.6 (28.7)	71.1 (21.7)	60.8 (16.0)	100.8 (38.2)
Mean daily maximum °F (°C)	48.4 (9.1)	54.1 (12.3)	62.8 (17.1)	70.3 (21.3)	79.9 (26.6)	90.4 (32.4)	91.2 (32.9)	88.8 (31.6)	82.5 (28.1)	70.6 (21.4)	57.3 (14.1)	47.3 (8.5)	70.3 (21.3)
Daily mean °F (°C)	37.4 (3.0)	41.9 (5.5)	49.5 (9.7)	56.8 (13.8)	66.1 (18.9)	76.1 (24.5)	78.9 (26.1)	76.9 (24.9)	70.3 (21.3)	58.4 (14.7)	45.7 (7.6)	36.9 (2.7)	57.9 (14.4)
Mean daily minimum °F (°C)	26.4 (−3.1)	29.8 (−1.2)	36.2 (2.3)	43.2 (6.2)	52.4 (11.3)	61.9 (16.6)	66.5 (19.2)	64.9 (18.3)	58.1 (14.5)	46.1 (7.8)	34.1 (1.2)	26.6 (−3.0)	45.5 (7.5)
Mean minimum °F (°C)	15.4 (−9.2)	17.6 (−8.0)	23.9 (−4.5)	30.5 (−0.8)	39.6 (4.2)	52.3 (11.3)	60.6 (15.9)	59.0 (15.0)	47.4 (8.6)	31.9 (−0.1)	21.3 (−5.9)	13.7 (−10.2)	10.9 (−11.7)
Record low °F (°C)	−17 (−27)	−10 (−23)	6 (−14)	13 (−11)	25 (−4)	35 (2)	42 (6)	46 (8)	26 (−3)	19 (−7)	−7 (−22)	−16 (−27)	−17 (−27)
Average precipitation inches (mm)	0.36 (9.1)	0.43 (11)	0.46 (12)	0.51 (13)	0.44 (11)	0.57 (14)	1.64 (42)	1.31 (33)	1.15 (29)	0.87 (22)	0.57 (14)	0.53 (13)	8.84 (225)
Average snowfall inches (cm)	1.4 (3.6)	1.5 (3.8)	0.7 (1.8)	0.3 (0.76)	0.0 (0.0)	0.0 (0.0)	0.0 (0.0)	0.0 (0.0)	0.0 (0.0)	0.3 (0.76)	0.9 (2.3)	2.8 (7.1)	7.9 (20)
Average precipitation days (≥ 0.01 in)	3.6	3.7	3.8	2.8	3.7	3.5	8.7	8.3	5.9	4.7	3.4	4.0	56.1
Average snowy days (≥ 0.1 in)	1.9	1.6	1.0	0.3	0.0	0.0	0.0	0.0	0.0	0.3	0.9	2.5	8.5
Average relative humidity (%)	56.3	49.8	39.7	32.5	31.1	29.8	41.9	47.1	47.4	45.3	49.9	56.8	44.0
Average dew point °F (°C)	18.0 (−7.8)	19.6 (−6.9)	19.2 (−7.1)	21.4 (−5.9)	27.9 (−2.3)	35.4 (1.9)	49.1 (9.5)	50.4 (10.2)	44.1 (6.7)	32.5 (0.3)	23.7 (−4.6)	19.0 (−7.2)	30.0 (−1.1)
Mean monthly sunshine hours	234.2	225.3	270.2	304.6	347.4	359.3	335.0	314.2	286.7	281.4	233.8	223.3	3,415.4
Percentage possible sunshine	75	74	73	78	80	83	76	75	77	80	75	73	77
Source: NOAA (relative humidity and sun 1961–1990)

Climate data for South Valley, New Mexico (elevation 4,955 ft (1,510.3 m), 1991–2020 normals, extremes 1991–2022)
Month	Jan	Feb	Mar	Apr	May	Jun	Jul	Aug	Sep	Oct	Nov	Dec	Year
Record high °F (°C)	73 (23)	79 (26)	86 (30)	89 (32)	101 (38)	105 (41)	104 (40)	101 (38)	98 (37)	89 (32)	79 (26)	70 (21)	105 (41)
Mean maximum °F (°C)	64.2 (17.9)	70.3 (21.3)	79.3 (26.3)	84.1 (28.9)	91.7 (33.2)	99.9 (37.7)	100.3 (37.9)	97.2 (36.2)	92.9 (33.8)	84.5 (29.2)	73.0 (22.8)	63.5 (17.5)	101.4 (38.6)
Mean daily maximum °F (°C)	51.1 (10.6)	57.1 (13.9)	65.5 (18.6)	72.4 (22.4)	80.9 (27.2)	90.9 (32.7)	92.5 (33.6)	90.1 (32.3)	83.4 (28.6)	72.2 (22.3)	59.7 (15.4)	49.9 (9.9)	72.1 (22.3)
Daily mean °F (°C)	36.7 (2.6)	41.9 (5.5)	49.3 (9.6)	56.2 (13.4)	64.5 (18.1)	73.9 (23.3)	78.0 (25.6)	76.0 (24.4)	68.6 (20.3)	56.8 (13.8)	44.6 (7.0)	36.1 (2.3)	56.9 (13.8)
Mean daily minimum °F (°C)	22.3 (−5.4)	26.8 (−2.9)	33.1 (0.6)	40.1 (4.5)	48.1 (8.9)	56.8 (13.8)	63.4 (17.4)	61.9 (16.6)	53.9 (12.2)	41.4 (5.2)	29.5 (−1.4)	22.4 (−5.3)	41.6 (5.3)
Mean minimum °F (°C)	9.9 (−12.3)	13.5 (−10.3)	19.4 (−7.0)	27.3 (−2.6)	35.6 (2.0)	46.4 (8.0)	56.1 (13.4)	54.1 (12.3)	42.3 (5.7)	27.9 (−2.3)	15.8 (−9.0)	10.4 (−12.0)	6.9 (−13.9)
Record low °F (°C)	−4 (−20)	−5 (−21)	6 (−14)	22 (−6)	26 (−3)	41 (5)	47 (8)	44 (7)	36 (2)	15 (−9)	9 (−13)	2 (−17)	−5 (−21)
Average precipitation inches (mm)	0.45 (11)	0.47 (12)	0.54 (14)	0.59 (15)	0.48 (12)	0.57 (14)	1.53 (39)	1.52 (39)	1.26 (32)	1.02 (26)	0.59 (15)	0.65 (17)	9.67 (246)
Average snowfall inches (cm)	1.4 (3.6)	1.3 (3.3)	0.6 (1.5)	0.3 (0.76)	0.0 (0.0)	0.0 (0.0)	0.0 (0.0)	0.0 (0.0)	0.0 (0.0)	0.3 (0.76)	0.6 (1.5)	2.3 (5.8)	6.8 (17)
Average precipitation days (≥ 0.01 in)	3.9	3.6	3.7	3.0	3.6	3.6	8.5	8.9	5.8	4.6	2.9	4.1	56.2
Average snowy days (≥ 0.1 in)	1.4	1.0	0.4	0.2	0.0	0.0	0.0	0.0	0.0	0.2	0.4	1.3	4.9
Source: NOAA

Climate data for Albuquerque Foothills (elevation 6,120 ft (1,865.4 m), 1991–2020 normals, extremes 1991–present)
Month	Jan	Feb	Mar	Apr	May	Jun	Jul	Aug	Sep	Oct	Nov	Dec	Year
Record high °F (°C)	69 (21)	71 (22)	81 (27)	86 (30)	96 (36)	103 (39)	104 (40)	101 (38)	95 (35)	86 (30)	75 (24)	64 (18)	104 (40)
Mean maximum °F (°C)	57.2 (14.0)	63.7 (17.6)	73.9 (23.3)	80.2 (26.8)	88.8 (31.6)	96.3 (35.7)	96.6 (35.9)	93.4 (34.1)	88.7 (31.5)	79.9 (26.6)	66.8 (19.3)	56.9 (13.8)	97.7 (36.5)
Mean daily maximum °F (°C)	45.2 (7.3)	51.1 (10.6)	60.1 (15.6)	68.5 (20.3)	77.6 (25.3)	87.7 (30.9)	88.7 (31.5)	86.3 (30.2)	79.8 (26.6)	67.7 (19.8)	54.3 (12.4)	44.5 (6.9)	67.6 (19.8)
Daily mean °F (°C)	35.4 (1.9)	39.8 (4.3)	47.4 (8.6)	54.4 (12.4)	63.3 (17.4)	72.9 (22.7)	75.6 (24.2)	73.6 (23.1)	67.3 (19.6)	55.6 (13.1)	43.6 (6.4)	35.2 (1.8)	55.3 (12.9)
Mean daily minimum °F (°C)	25.6 (−3.6)	28.6 (−1.9)	34.7 (1.5)	40.2 (4.6)	49.1 (9.5)	58.2 (14.6)	62.4 (16.9)	60.9 (16.1)	54.8 (12.7)	43.4 (6.3)	32.9 (0.5)	25.8 (−3.4)	43.0 (6.1)
Mean minimum °F (°C)	12.4 (−10.9)	15.2 (−9.3)	19.8 (−6.8)	26.5 (−3.1)	35.0 (1.7)	47.5 (8.6)	55.3 (12.9)	54.1 (12.3)	41.9 (5.5)	27.7 (−2.4)	17.7 (−7.9)	10.6 (−11.9)	8.5 (−13.1)
Record low °F (°C)	2 (−17)	−12 (−24)	10 (−12)	20 (−7)	28 (−2)	40 (4)	48 (9)	48 (9)	31 (−1)	17 (−8)	10 (−12)	3 (−16)	−12 (−24)
Average precipitation inches (mm)	0.71 (18)	0.85 (22)	1.05 (27)	0.88 (22)	0.70 (18)	0.61 (15)	2.61 (66)	2.66 (68)	1.56 (40)	1.33 (34)	0.88 (22)	1.08 (27)	14.92 (379)
Average snowfall inches (cm)	4.0 (10)	4.4 (11)	3.7 (9.4)	1.7 (4.3)	0.0 (0.0)	0.0 (0.0)	0.0 (0.0)	0.0 (0.0)	0.0 (0.0)	0.6 (1.5)	2.4 (6.1)	6.9 (18)	23.7 (60)
Average precipitation days (≥ 0.01 in)	5.3	5.5	5.4	4.2	5.1	4.1	11.7	10.5	7.4	5.8	4.7	5.8	75.5
Average snowy days (≥ 0.1 in)	3.4	3.1	2.5	1.2	0.2	0.0	0.0	0.0	0.0	0.4	1.4	3.8	16.0
Source: NOAA

=== Hydrology ===
Albuquerque's drinking water comes from a combination of Rio Grande water (river water diverted from the Colorado River basin through the San Juan–Chama Project) and a delicate aquifer that has been described as an "underground Lake Superior". The Albuquerque Bernalillo County Water Utility Authority (ABCWUA) has developed a water resources management strategy that pursues conservation and the direct extraction of water from the Rio Grande for the development of a stable underground aquifer in the future.

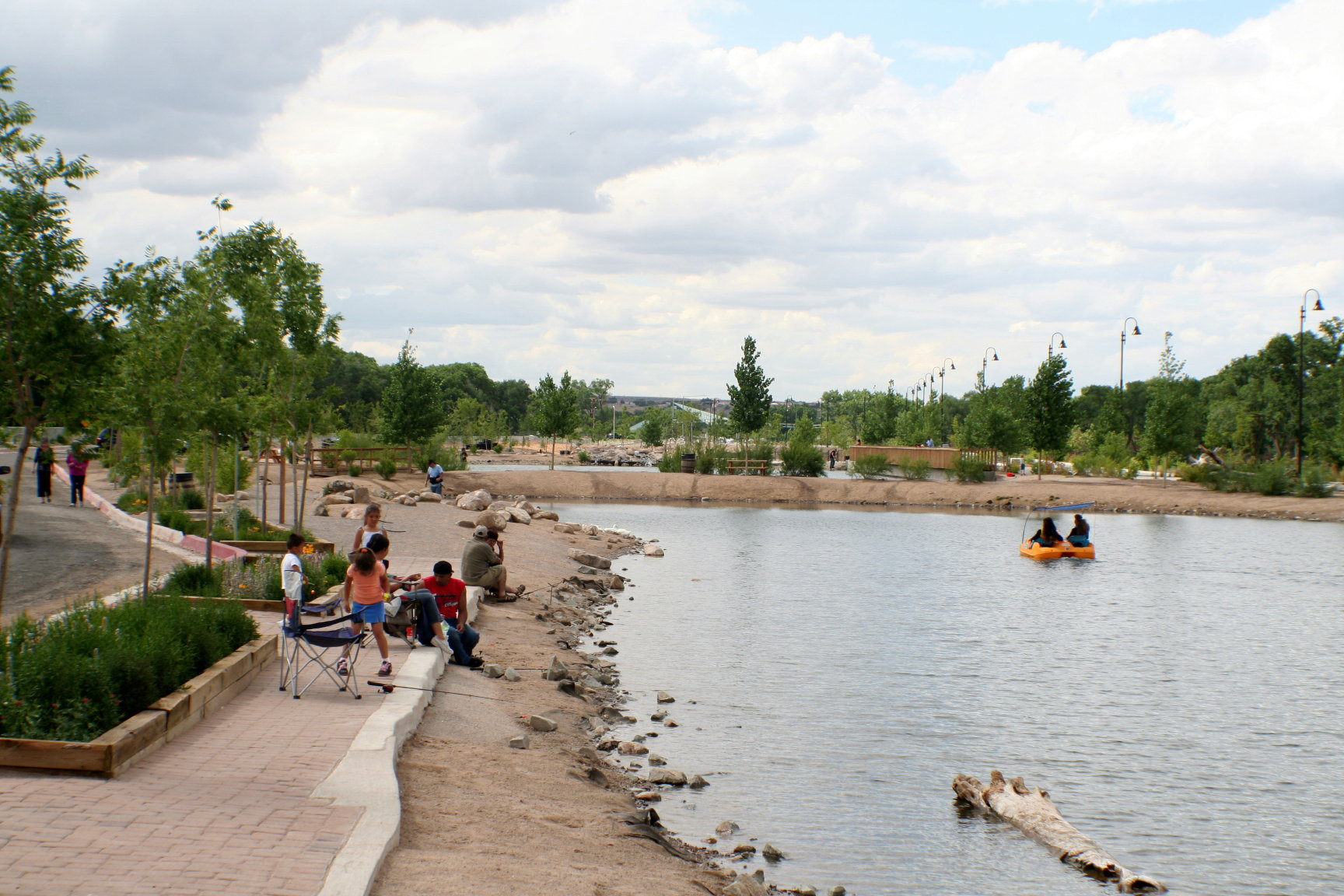
Tingley Beach in Old Town, Albuquerque, a pond in a former watercourse by the Rio Grande

The aquifer of the Rio Puerco is too saline to be cost-effectively used for drinking. Much of the rainwater Albuquerque receives does not recharge its aquifer. It is diverted through a network of paved channels and arroyos, and empties into the Rio Grande.

Of the 62,780 acre-feet (77,440,000 m^{3}) per year of the water in the upper Colorado River basin entitled to municipalities in New Mexico by the Upper Colorado River Basin Compact, Albuquerque owns 48,200. The water is delivered to the Rio Grande by the San Juan–Chama Project. The project's construction was initiated by legislation signed by President John F. Kennedy in 1962, and was completed in 1971. This diversion project transports water under the continental divide from Navajo Lake to Lake Heron on the Rio Chama, a tributary of the Rio Grande. In the past much of this water was resold to downstream owners in Texas. These arrangements ended in 2008 with the completion of the ABCWUA's Drinking Water Supply Project.

The ABCWUA's Drinking Water Supply Project uses a system of adjustable-height dams to skim water from the Rio Grande into sluices that lead to water treatment facilities for direct conversion to potable water. Some water is allowed to flow through central Albuquerque, mostly to protect the endangered Rio Grande silvery minnow. Treated effluent water is recycled into the Rio Grande south of the city. The ABCWUA expects river water to comprise up to seventy percent of its water budget in 2060. Groundwater will constitute the remainder. One of the policies of the ABCWUA's strategy is the acquisition of additional river water.

== Demographics ==
Residents of the city are known as Burqueños (masculine grammatical gender) or Burqueñas (feminine grammatical gender), or more rarely as simply "Albuquerqueans". The Spanish terms are from Chicano slang (Caló). "Burqueño" is also sometimes used as an adjective for anything related to that city, or to specifically refer to someone who identifies with the Burqueños New Mexico prison gang, or one of the barrios within Albuquerque. Burqueños often speak New Mexican Spanish and Western American English.

Historical population
Census	Pop.	Note	%±
1880	2,315		—
1890	3,785		63.5%
1900	6,238		64.8%
1910	11,020		76.7%
1920	15,157		37.5%
1930	26,570		75.3%
1940	35,449		33.4%
1950	96,815		173.1%
1960	201,189		107.8%
1970	244,501		21.5%
1980	332,920		36.2%
1990	384,736		15.6%
2000	448,607		16.6%
2010	545,852		21.7%
2020	564,559		3.4%
2025 (est.)	556,588	▼	−1.4%
U.S. Decennial Census; 2010–2020

Historical racial profile	2020	2010	1990	1970	1950
Hispanic or Latino (of any race)	49.2%	46.7%	34.5%	33.1%	N/A
White	70.3%	69.7%	78.2%	95.7%	98.0%
—Non-Hispanic	38.3%	42.1%	58.3%	63.3%	N/A
American Indian and Alaska Native persons	4.5%	4.6%			
Black or African American	3.1%	3.3%	3.0%	2.2%	1.3%
Asian	3%	2.6%	1.7%	0.3%	0.1%

According to the 2020 U.S. census, there were 564,559 people and 229,701 households in Albuquerque. The population density was 2,907.6 inhabitants per square mile (1,122.6/km^{2}), making Albuquerque one of the least densely populated large cities in the U.S.

In 2020, the racial makeup of the city (including Latinos in the racial counts) was 60.3% White, 4.5% Native American, 3.1% Black or African American, 3% Asian, 0.1% Native Hawaiian and other Pacific Islander, and 9.2% Multiracial (two or more races). About half of all residents (47.7%) were Hispanic or Latino, of any race while non-Hispanic whites accounted for 37.7%.

=== 2020 census ===
Albuquerque, New Mexico – Racial and ethnic composition Note: the US Census treats Hispanic/Latino as an ethnic category. This table excludes Latinos from the racial categories and assigns them to a separate category. Hispanics/Latinos may be of any race.
Race / Ethnicity (NH = Non-Hispanic)	Pop 2000	Pop 2010	Pop 2020	% 2000	% 2010	% 2020
White alone (NH)	223,895	229,933	212,966	49.91%	42.12%	37.72%
Black or African American alone (NH)	12,376	14,878	16,649	2.76%	2.73%	2.95%
Native American or Alaska Native alone (NH)	14,813	20,627	25,195	3.30%	3.78%	4.46%
Asian alone (NH)	9,689	13,674	18,041	2.16%	2.51%	3.20%
Pacific Islander alone (NH)	339	418	483	0.08%	0.08%	0.09%
Other race alone (NH)	682	1,224	2,888	0.15%	0.22%	0.51%
Mixed race or Multiracial (NH)	7,738	10,043	19,099	1.72%	1.84%	3.38%
Hispanic or Latino (any race)	179,075	255,055	269,238	39.92%	46.73%	47.69%
Total	448,607	545,852	564,559	100.00%	100.00%	100.00%

In 2010, about one-third of Albuquerque households (33.3%) had children under the age of 18, 43.6% were married couples living together, 12.9% had a female with no husband present, and 38.5% were non-families; 30.5% of all households were made up of individuals, and 8.4% had someone living alone who was 65 years of age or older. The average household size was 2.40 and the average family size was 3.02.

In 2010, the age distribution was 24.5% under 18, 10.6% from 18 to 24, 30.9% from 25 to 44, 21.9% from 45 to 64, and 12.0% who were 65 or older. The median age was 35 years. For every 100 females, there were 94.4 males. For every 100 females age 18 and over, there were 91.8 males.

In 2010, the median income for a household in the city was $38,272, and the median income for a family was $46,979. Males had a median income of $34,208 versus $26,397 for females. The per capita income for the city was $20,884. About 10.0% of families and 13.5% of the population were below the poverty line, including 17.4% of those under age 18 and 8.5% of those age 65 or over.

The Albuquerque metropolitan area had 923,630 residents in July 2020. The area includes Rio Rancho, Bernalillo, Placitas, Zia Pueblo, Los Lunas, Belen, South Valley, Bosque Farms, Jemez Pueblo, Cuba, and part of Laguna Pueblo. This metro is part of the larger Albuquerque–Santa Fe–Los Alamos combined statistical area (CSA), with a population of 1,171,991 as of 2016. The CSA constitutes the southernmost point of the Southern Rocky Mountain Front megalopolis, with a population of 5,467,633 according to the 2010 United States census, including other major Rocky Mountain region cities such as Cheyenne, Wyoming; Denver, Colorado; and Colorado Springs, Colorado.

=== Religion ===
Of the residents of Albuquerque who are religious, the majority of them are Christian. Reflecting its long history as a Spanish city, Catholicism is the largest denomination; Catholics are served by the Roman Catholic Archdiocese of Santa Fe, whose administrative center is located in Albuquerque. Collectively, other Christian churches and organizations, such as the Eastern Orthodox Church and Oriental Orthodoxy, among others, make up the second largest group. Baptists form the third largest Christian group, followed by Latter Day Saints, Pentecostals, Methodists, Presbyterians, Lutherans and Episcopalians.

Judaism is the second-largest non-Christian religion in Albuquerque; Congregation Albert, a Reform synagogue established in 1897, is the oldest extant Jewish organization in New Mexico. Islam is the next largest minority religion, with an estimated 3,000 to 5,000 adherents, representing 85% of the state's Muslim population. The Islamic Center of New Mexico is the largest mosque in Albuquerque, hosting daily prayers and activities for both Muslims and non-Muslims.

The Albuquerque Sikh Gurudwara and Guru Nanak Gurdwara Albuquerque serve the city's Sikh population, while the main Hindu organizations are the Hindu Temple Society of New Mexico and Gayatri Temple. There are several Buddhist temples and centers throughout the city, representing different movements and schools, such as Zen and Soka Gakki.

=== Homelessness ===
Like many major American cities, Albuquerque struggles with homelessness, which has become more visible since the 2000s. According to Rock at Noon Day, a homeless services center, there were an estimated 4,000 to 4,500 homeless people living in the Albuquerque metropolitan area in 2019, with millennials and elderly accounting for the fastest growing segments. Albuquerque Public Schools spokeswoman Monica Armenta said the number of homeless children enrolled in district schools (meaning children from families that have no permanent address) has consistently ranged from 3,200 to 3,500. The Coordinated Entry System, a centralized citywide system used to track and fill supportive housing openings when they become available, shows that about 5,000 households experienced homelessness in 2018. Homelessness is particularly concentrated around Downtown, and also in the International District off Central Avenue, which suffers from chronic urban decay and drug use.

== Arts and culture ==
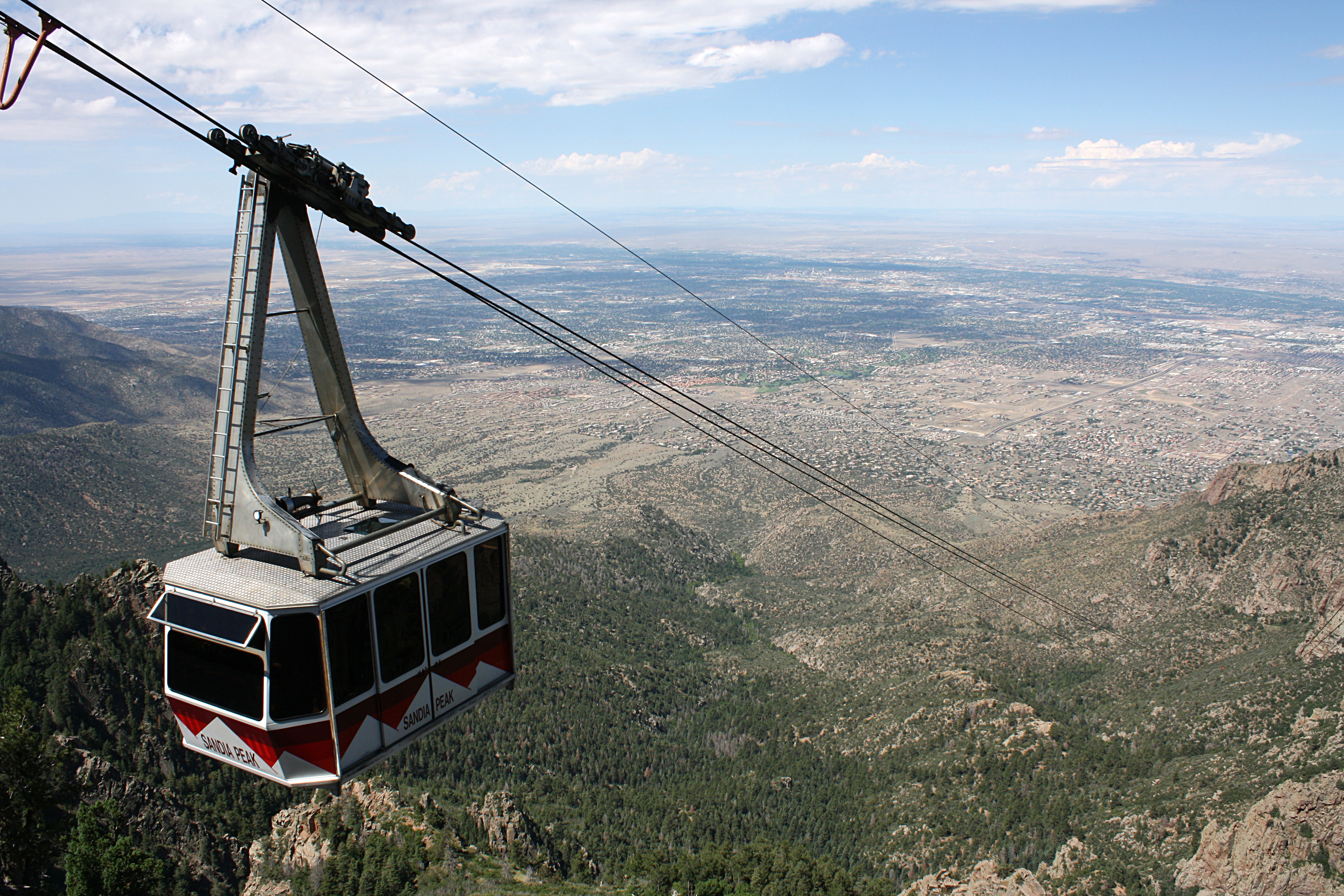
Sandia Peak Tramway

Albuquerque hosts the International Balloon Fiesta, the world's largest gathering of hot-air balloons, taking place every October at Balloon Fiesta Park, with its 47-acre launch field. Another large venue is Expo New Mexico, where other annual events are held, such as North America's largest pow wow at the Gathering of Nations, as well as the New Mexico State Fair. Other major venues throughout the metropolitan area include the National Hispanic Cultural Center, the University of New Mexico's Popejoy Hall, Santa Ana Star Center, and Isleta Amphitheater. Old Town Albuquerque's Plaza, Hotel, and San Felipe de Neri Church hosts traditional fiestas and events such as weddings, also near Old Town are the New Mexico Museum of Natural History and Science, Albuquerque Museum of Art and History, Indian Pueblo Cultural Center, Explora, American International Rattlesnake Museum, and Albuquerque Biological Park. Other notable museums in Albuquerque include the National Museum of Nuclear Science & History and the Anderson-Abruzzo Albuquerque International Balloon Fiesta Museum and more can be found here. Located in Downtown Albuquerque are historic theaters such as the KiMo Theater, which is located across the street from the New Mexico Holocaust & Intolerance Museum, and the Albuquerque Little Theater. Near the Civic Plaza is the Al Hurricane Pavilion and Albuquerque Convention Center with its Kiva Auditorium. Due to its population size, the metropolitan area regularly receives most national and international music concerts, Broadway shows, and other large traveling events, as well as New Mexico music, and other local music performances.

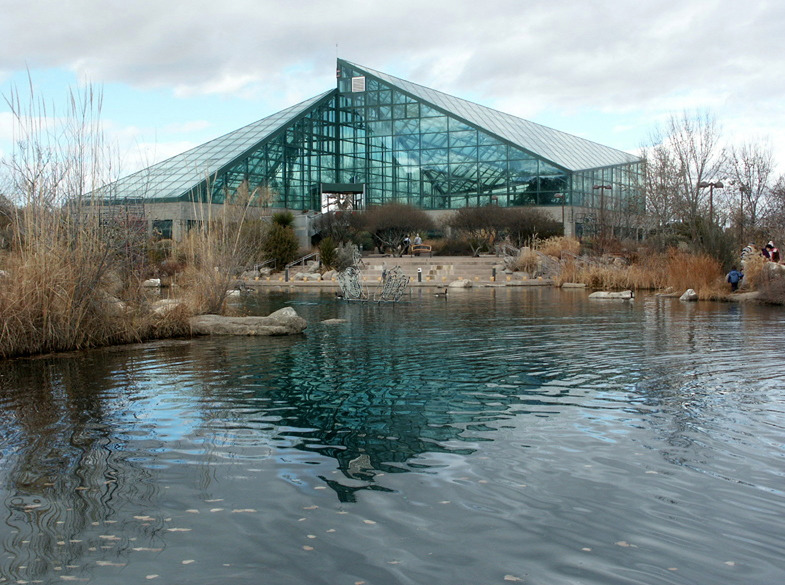
Albuquerque Botanical Gardens

Sandia Peak Ski Area, adjacent to Albuquerque, provides both winter and summer recreation in the Sandia Mountains. It features Sandia Peak Tramway, the world's second-longest passenger aerial tramway, and the longest in the Americas. It stretches from the northeast edge of the city to Sandia Peak, the summit of the ski resort, and has the world's third-longest single span. Elevation at the summit is roughly 10,300 ft (3,100 m) above sea level, or "ten-three".

=== Media and entertainment ===
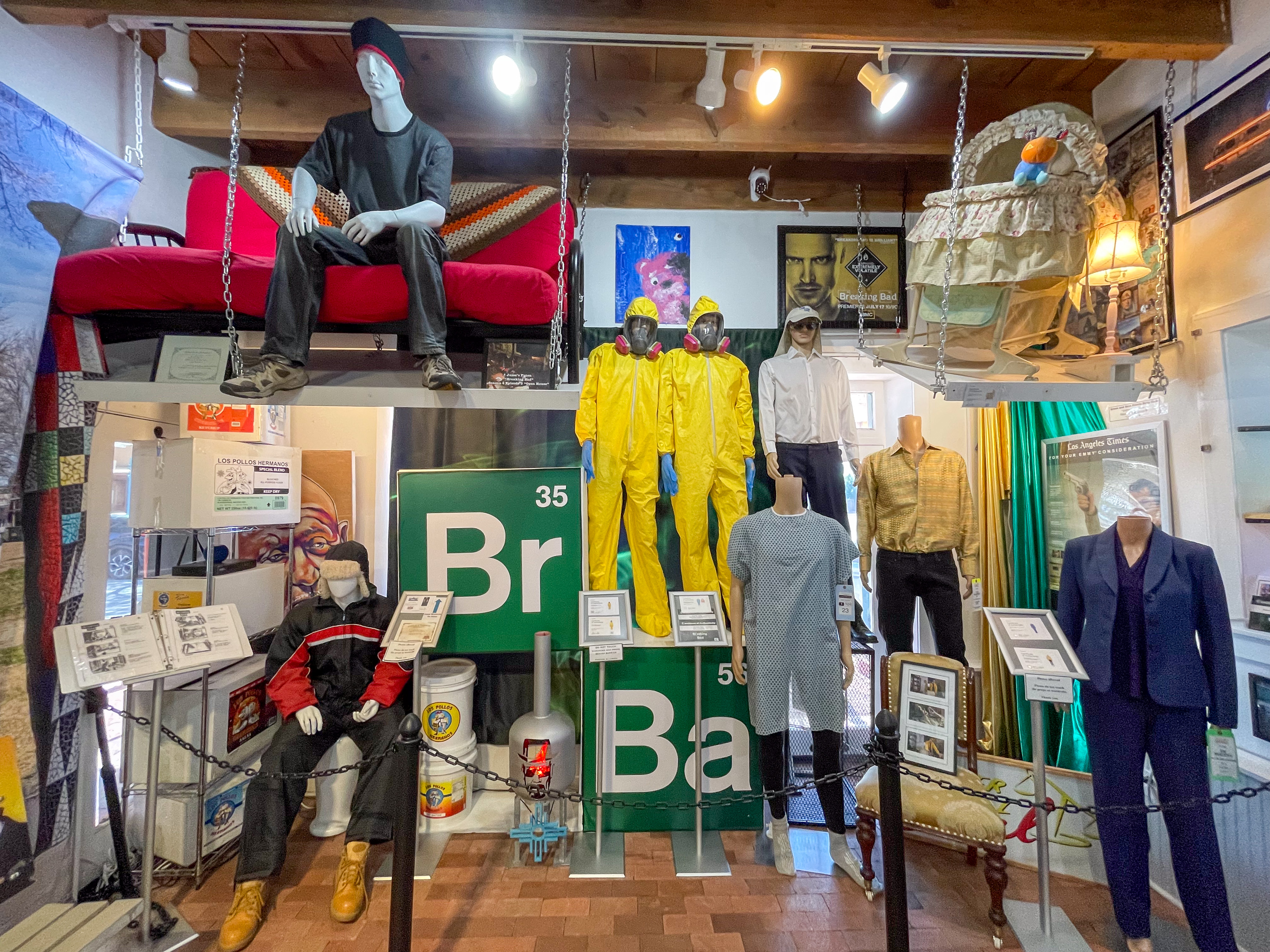
Breaking Bad themed store in Old Town

Albuquerque is a hub for production studios, including Albuquerque Studios (now Netflix Studios Albuquerque), which Netflix has developed as a production hub in the city.

Several major motion pictures and television shows have been filmed and produced in Albuquerque, including scenes from Walt Disney Presents Elfego Baca, The Muppet Movie, the Breaking Bad franchise, The Avengers, A Million Ways to Die in the West, In Plain Sight, Speechless, Daybreak, Just Getting Started, Stranger Things season 4, and Pluribus. NBCUniversal also has a sizable and expanding presence in the city, as do independent multimedia franchise studios.

Numerous works of fiction take place, either fully or in part, in the Albuquerque metropolitan area. These include Albuquerque (a 1948 Western), Bless Me, Ultima, The Good, the Bad, and the Ugly, Breaking Bad (along with its spin-offs Better Call Saul and El Camino), Pluribus, High School Musical, and Coyote vs. Acme. The city is referenced in Billy Mize's 1967 album Lights of Albuquerque, Jim Glaser's 1986 song "The Lights of Albuquerque", Neil Young's song "Albuquerque", and "Weird" Al Yankovic's song "Albuquerque". The city is referenced in "Hungry, Hungry Homer", the 15th episode of the twelfth season of The Simpsons, which features Albuquerque as the location where the owners of the Springfield Isotopes baseball team wish to relocate; the episode inspired the name of the real Albuquerque Isotopes Minor League team. Many Bugs Bunny cartoon shorts feature Bugs traveling around the world by burrowing underground. Ending up in the wrong place, Bugs consults a map, complaining, "I knew I should have taken that left turn at Albuquerque." Failure to do so can somehow result in Bugs ending up thousands of miles off-course. (Bugs first uses that line in 1945's Herr Meets Hare.)

The city is served by one major newspaper, the Albuquerque Journal, which, along with Albuquerque the Magazine, is distributed throughout the Southwestern United States and catalogued by the Library of Congress. The Journal is New Mexico's most widely circulated newspaper, and used to compete with The Albuquerque Tribune until 2008; today The Journal competes with The Santa Fe New Mexican and Las Cruces Sun-News. The Albuquerque metropolitan area itself has other local periodicals, Valencia County News-Bulletin, Rio Rancho Observer, Corrales Comment, and the student newspapers of The Lobo at University of New Mexico and CNM Chronicle at Central New Mexico Community College.

Albuquerque is also home to numerous radio and television stations that serve the metropolitan and outlying rural areas. Albuquerque is home to eighteen broadcast television stations, including KOB, KRQE, KOAT-TV, and KLUZ-TV, although most households are served by direct cable network connections. Comcast Cable nearly has a monopoly on terrestrial cable service in the city, but not throughout the entire Albuquerque-Santa Fe media market, which is ranked as the 48th largest television market in the United States, Comcast shares the metropolitan market with Cable One, Unite Private Networks, and various satellite and wireless providers.

Christian media outlets in the city include Trinity Broadcasting Network which owns the KNAT-TV signal, and independent Christian broadcasting exists on KAZQ. Each of the Albuquerque metropolitan area's megachurches have media presence with broadcasts of their sermons, those include Legacy, Calvary, and Sagebrush. Christian radio is found on FM and AM through KLYT, KSVA, KDAZ, KFLQ, and KKIM.

==== Radio and music ====
One of the longest running AM broadcasts in the United States is an ABC News Radio station called KKOB (AM). The first officially licensed FM radio broadcast in Albuquerque was KANW which mostly broadcasts the New Mexico music genre and NPR programming.

Performers such as Al Hurricane, Al Hurricane Jr, Lorenzo Antonio, and Sparx popularized New Mexico's Hispano and Native American folk genre by blending it with rockabilly, jazz, Western, Norteño, Latin pop, and rock music. Then mayor Richard J. Berry named the center stage of Albuquerque Plaza the "Al Hurricane Pavilion". Regional folk and country music continues to be played on local radio, such as the New Mexico music genre–specific KANW, as well as KNMM on Saturdays, country radio stations KRST "92.1" and KBQI "The Big-I 107.9", along with KBQI's classic country "98.1 The Bull", and Regional Mexican radio on KLVO "Radio Lobo 97.7".

Other forms of American popular music are represented on FM radio: contemporary hit radio is featured on KOBQ. During the 1990s, the urban contemporary music radio format had two major stations, on "KISS 97.3" KKSS and "WILD 106" KDLW. KISS 97.3 still exists today, though WILD has changed to a variety of formats. In the 2000s modern rock stations focusing on alternative rock, nu metal, and adult contemporary music became popular in the city, including the FM station KPEK "100.3 The Peak". During this time, contemporary Christian music garnered success with KLYT, branded as M88 in its earlier days, due to the crossover of Christian rock and Christian hip hop with popular music.

Music groups based in Albuquerque include A Hawk and A Hacksaw, Beirut, The Echoing Green, The Eyeliners, Hazeldine, Leiahdorus, Oliver Riot, Scared of Chaka, and The Shins.

Talk radio has several outlets in the Albuquerque area. Including a public radio station run by The University of New Mexico KUNM-FM, for conservative talk radio there is KIVA "The Rock of Talk" owned by Eddy Aragon, and KKOB has a Cumulus Media station affiliated with ABC News Radio. As for sports radio there is KNML "The Sports Animal" and KQTM "The Team".

=== Food and agriculture ===
As a large and multicultural city, Albuquerque is home to a variety of global cuisines, in addition to local New Mexican cuisine. Many local restaurants receive statewide attention, with several becoming chains; the city hosts the headquarters of Blake's Lotaburger, Little Anita's, Twisters, Dion's, Boba Tea Company, and Sadie's, most of which offer New Mexican fare.

As the focus of the Middle Rio Grande Conservancy District, the city is punctuated by agricultural acequias that contrast with the otherwise heavily urban settings. Crops such as New Mexico chile are grown along the entire Rio Grande; the red or green chile pepper is a staple of New Mexican cuisine and widely available in restaurants, including national fast-food chains. Likewise, the Albuquerque metro is a major contributor to the Middle Rio Grande Valley AVA, where New Mexico wine is produced at several vineyards; the river also provides trade access to the Mesilla Valley to the south (containing Las Cruces, New Mexico and El Paso, Texas), with its own wine offerings, and the adjacent Hatch Valley, which is well known for its New Mexico chile peppers. Albuquerque also has a burgeoning brewery scene.

=== International Balloon Fiesta ===
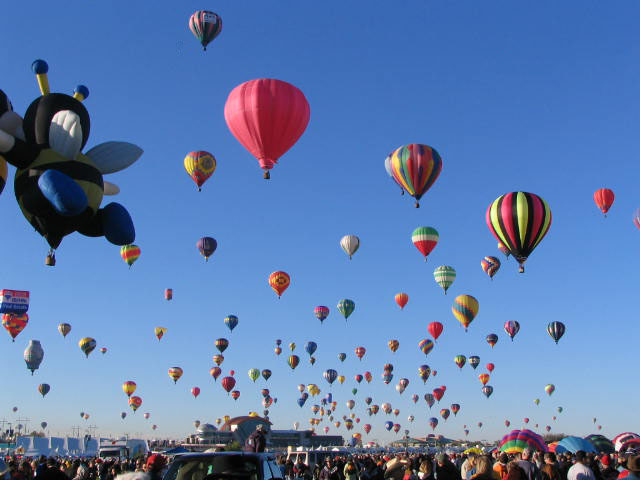
Albuquerque International Balloon Fiesta

The Albuquerque International Balloon Fiesta takes place at Balloon Fiesta Park the first week of October. Although the global COVID-19 forced the cancellation of the 2020 event, The Albuquerque International Balloon Fiesta successfully returned in 2021. It is one of Albuquerque's biggest attractions. Hundreds of hot-air balloons are seen every day, and there is live music, arts and crafts, and food.

=== Architecture ===
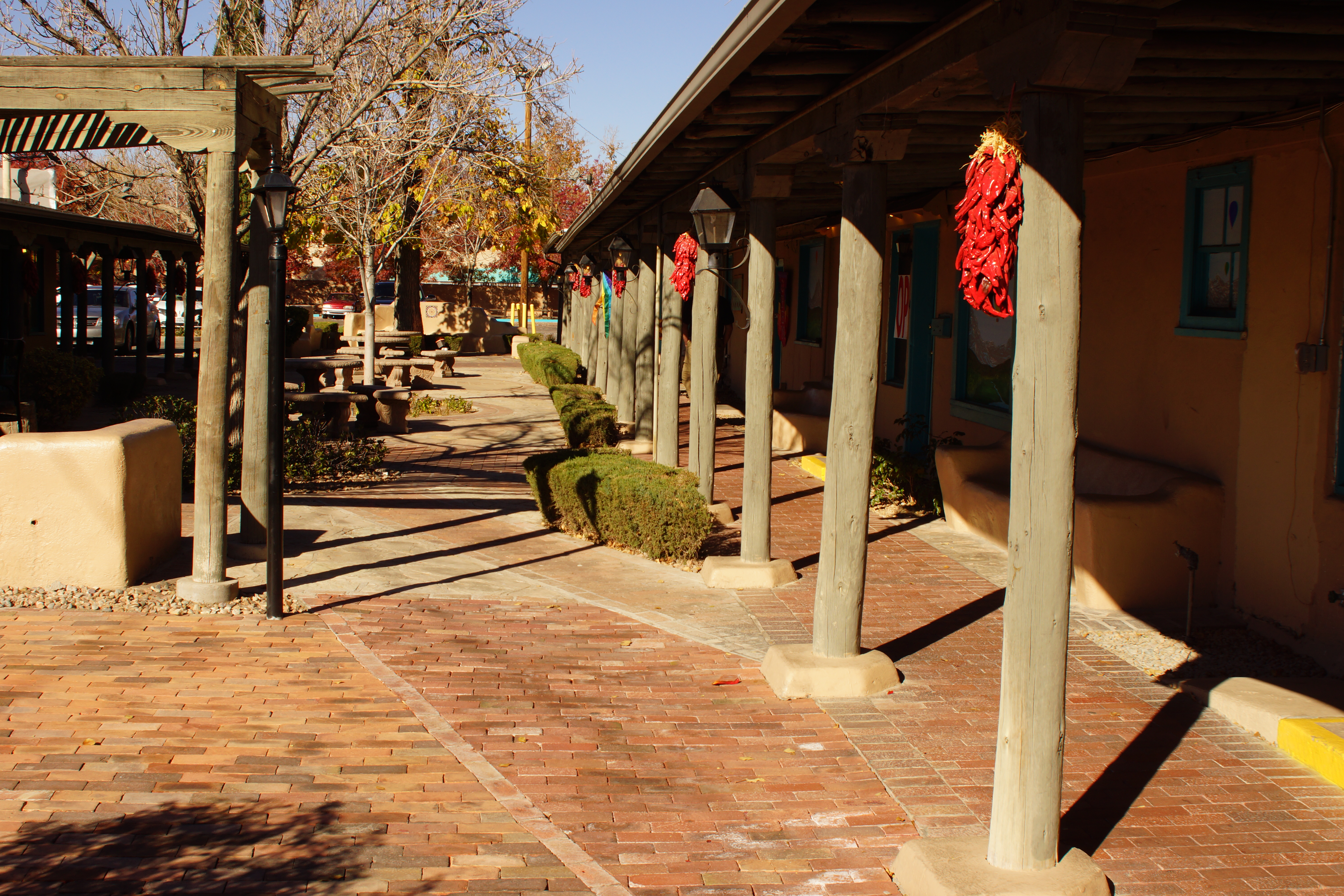
Old Town Albuquerque is filled with Territorial Style architecture and design.

The original architecture of La Villa de Albuquerque is referred to as the Territorial Style, it was revitalized as the Territorial Revival architecture. Architect John Gaw Meem is often credited with this revival.

John Gaw Meem is also credited with developing and popularizing the Pueblo Revival style, which was based in Santa Fe but received an important Albuquerque commission in 1933 as the architect of the University of New Mexico. He retained this commission for the next quarter-century and developed the university's distinctive Southwest style. Meem also designed the Cathedral Church of St. John in 1950.

Pueblo Deco architecture was derived from Pueblo and Territorial styles meeting the Art Deco movement, and it is richly featured in downtown Albuquerque. Albuquerque boasts a unique nighttime cityscape, personified in the lights of Albuquerque, a common motif in art and song. The city lights twinkle and glitter from views on Nine Mile Hill, it was among Elvis Presley's favorite views. Route 66 era neon signs, and LED style versions of the neon-style are common throughout the city. Many building exteriors are illuminated in vibrant colors such as green and blue. The Wells Fargo Building is illuminated green. The DoubleTree Hotel changes colors nightly, and the Compass Bank building is illuminated blue. The rotunda of the county courthouse is illuminated yellow, while the tops of the Bank of Albuquerque and the Bank of the West are illuminated reddish-yellow. Due to the nature of the soil in the Rio Grande Valley, the skyline is lower than might be expected in a city of comparable size elsewhere, and it was used to highlight the low-lying architecture of heritage Pueblo and Hispano architectural styles.

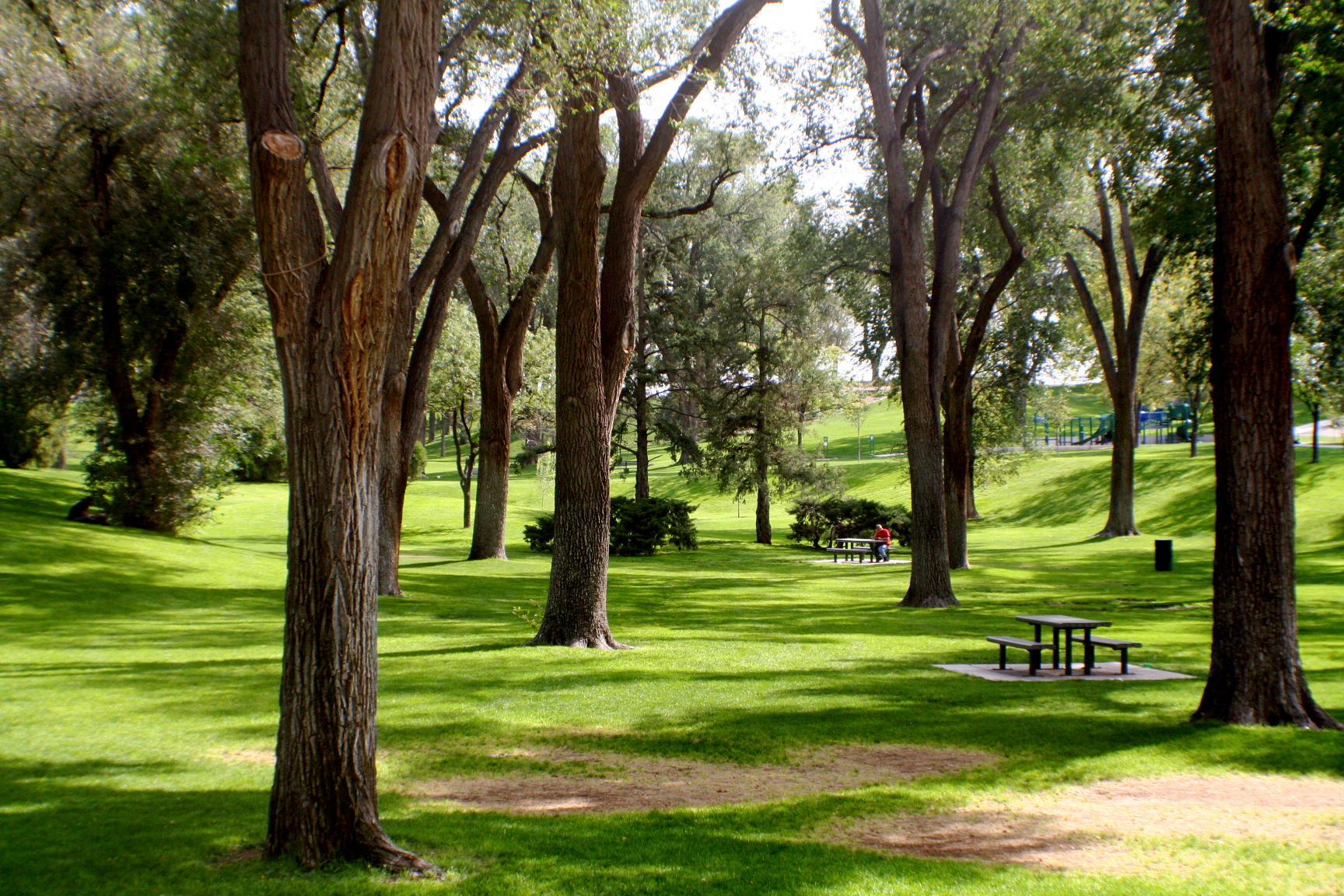
Roosevelt Park is a historic park in central Albuquerque.

Albuquerque has expanded greatly in area since the mid-1940s. During those years of expansion, the planning of the newer areas has considered that people drive rather than walk. The pre-1940s parts of Albuquerque are quite different in style and scale from the post-1940s areas. The older areas include the North Valley, the South Valley, various neighborhoods near downtown, and Corrales. The newer areas generally feature four- to six-lane roads in a 1 mile (1.61 km) grid. Each 1 square mile (2.59 km^{2}) is divided into four 160-acre (0.65 km^{2}) neighborhoods by smaller roads set 0.5 miles (0.8 km) between major roads. When driving along major roads in the newer sections of Albuquerque, one sees strip malls, signs, and cinderblock walls. The upside of this planning style is that neighborhoods are shielded from the worst of the noise and lights on the major roads.

=== Libraries ===
The Albuquerque Bernalillo County Library system consists of nineteen libraries to serve the city, including the Main Library, Special Collections branch (Old Main Library), and Ernie Pyle branch, which is located in the former home of noted war correspondent Ernie Pyle. The Old Main Library was the first library of Albuquerque and from 1901 until 1948 it was the only public library. The original library was donated to the state by Joshua and Sarah Raynolds. After suffering some fire damage in 1923 the city decided it was time to construct a building for the library to be moved to, however, by 1970 even after additions were made the population and library needs had outgrown the building for its use as a main library and it was turned into Special Collections. The Old Main Library was recognized as a landmark in September 1979. It was not until 1974 with the movement of the South Valley Library into a new building that the Bernalillo built and administered a public library. Not long after, in 1986, the Bernalillo and Albuquerque government decided that joint powers would work best to serve the needs of the community and created the Albuquerque/Bernalillo County Library System.

=== Parks and recreation ===
The Bosque is a major outdoor area of the city with numerous hiking and biking trails. The Sandia–Manzano Mountains and West Mesa also have many hiking trails, such as La Luz Trail and Petroglyph National Monument. According to the Trust for Public Land, Albuquerque has 291 public parks as of 2017, most of which are administered by the city Parks and Recreation Department. The total amount of parkland is 42.9 square miles (111 km2), or about 23% of the city's total area—one of the highest percentages among large cities in the U.S. About 82% of city residents live within walking distance of a park.

The Albuquerque Biological Park manages the ABQ BioPark Botanic Garden, ABQ BioPark Aquarium, Tingley Beach, and ABQ BioPark Zoo. Amusement parks in the city include Cliff's Amusement Park and Hinkle Family Fun Center; there was formerly The Beach waterpark, which became a vacant lot on Desert Surf Circle for several years, until Topgolf made a driving range in the lot.

There are numerous golf courses in the city area; Arroyo Del Oso Golf Course, Isleta Eagle Golf Course, Ladera Golf Course, Los Altos Golf Course, Paa-Ko Ridge Golf Club, Paradise Hills Golf Course, Puerto del Sol Golf Course, Sandia Golf Club, Santa Ana Golf Club, Twin Warriors Golf Club, and University of New Mexico's Championship Golf Course.

=== Traditional arts ===
Albuquerque is home to over 300 other visual arts, music, dance, literary, film, ethnic, and craft organizations, museums, festivals and associations, and the state's capital Santa Fe is known for being a major arts city. One of the major art events in the state is the summertime New Mexico Arts and Crafts Fair, a nonprofit show exclusively for New Mexico artists and held annually in Albuquerque since 1961.

== Sports ==
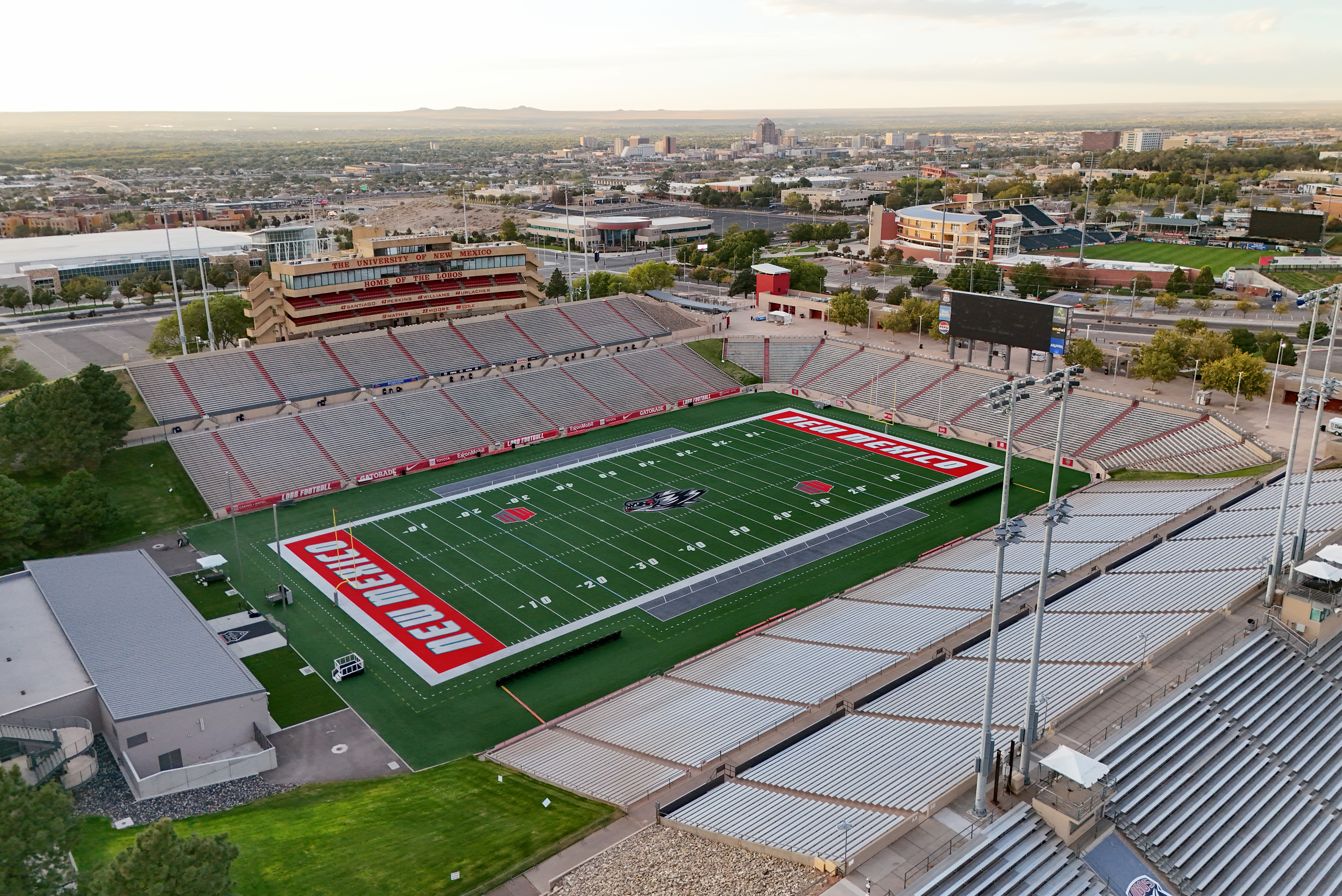
University Stadium, home to the New Mexico Lobos football

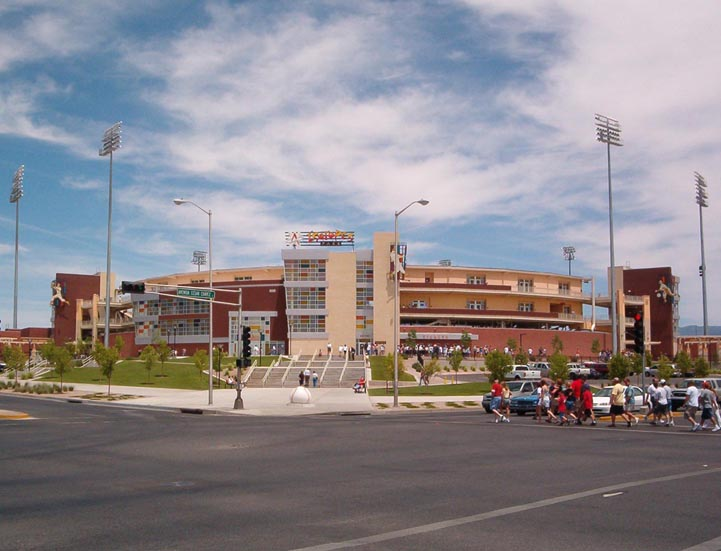
Isotopes baseball park

The Albuquerque Isotopes are a minor league affiliate of the Colorado Rockies, having derived their name from The Simpsons season 12 episode "Hungry, Hungry Homer", which involves the Springfield Isotopes baseball team considering relocating to Albuquerque.

On June 6, 2018, the USL Championship division announced its latest soccer expansion club with New Mexico United, who play their home matches at Rio Grande Credit Union Field at Isotopes Park.

Having been home to boxing mainstays Brenda Burnside, Bob Foster, and Johnny Tapia, Albuquerque later became home to Jackson Wink MMA gym. Several MMA world champions and fighters, including Holly Holm and Jon Jones, train in that facility. The PGA of America offers Albuquerque golf tournaments with Sun Country Golf House, including the Sun Country PGA Championship and the New Mexico Open which have been hosted in the metropolitan area several times. Roller sports are finding a home in Albuquerque as they hosted USARS Championships in 2015, and are home to Roller hockey, and Roller Derby teams.

While no longer operating in an official capacity, the defunct Albuquerque Dukes minor league baseball team still has a major following, and the Major League Baseball organization is aware of the team's continued popularity. The Isotopes sometimes hold a Dukes Retro Night where they wear Dukes uniforms, and The Duke mascot continues to be an icon of the city.

Team	Sport	League	Venue	capacity
New Mexico Goatheads	Ice hockey	ECHL	Rio Rancho Events Center	6,000
Albuquerque Isotopes	Baseball	Pacific Coast League	Rio Grande Credit Union Field at Isotopes Park	13,279
New Mexico United	Soccer	USL Championship	Rio Grande Credit Union Field at Isotopes Park	13,279
Albuquerque Sol	Soccer	USL League Two	Ben Rios Field	1,500
New Mexico Chupacabras	Indoor Football	Indoor Football League	Tingley Coliseum	11,571
New Mexico Lobos	NCAA Division I FBS Football	Mountain West Conference	University Stadium	42,000
New Mexico Lobos (men and women)	NCAA Division I Basketball	Mountain West Conference	The Pit	15,411
New Mexico Ice Wolves	Ice hockey	NAHL	Outpost Ice Arenas	
New Mexico Macanas	Ulama de Cadera	AJUPEME USA	Mesa Verde Community Center	

== Government and politics ==
Albuquerque registered voters as of July 2016
Party	Number of Voters	Percentage
Democratic	123,594	40.03%
Republican	104,662	34.13%
Unaffiliated and third party	78,404	25.57%

Albuquerque is a charter city, exercising home rule as opposed to being directly governed by state law. Its charter was adopted in 1917 and has been amended several times, most notably in 1974, when the municipal government was changed from a commission-manager system to its current mayor–council system. Under this arrangement, power is divided between a mayor who serves as chief executive, and a nine-member council that holds legislative authority. The current mayor is Tim Keller, who was elected in 2017.

The mayor of Albuquerque holds a full-time paid position and is directly elected for four-year terms. Members of the Albuquerque City Council serve part-time, paid positions and are elected from their nine respective districts for four-year terms, with four or five councilors elected every two years. Elections for mayor and councilor are nonpartisan. Each December, a new council president and vice-president are chosen by and among council members.

The city council has the power to adopt all ordinances, resolutions, or other legislation. It meets twice a month in the Vincent E. Griego Council Chambers of the Albuquerque/Bernalillo County Government Center. Ordinances and resolutions passed by the council are presented to the mayor for his approval; if the mayor vetoes an item, the council can override the veto by a two-thirds vote of councilors. Each year, the mayor submits a city budget proposal for the next year to the council by April 1, and the council acts on the proposal within the next 60 days.

Albuquerque's judicial system consists of the Bernalillo County Metropolitan Court, which serves other municipalities and unincorporated areas in the county; the main Metropolitan Courthouse is located in downtown. Judges serve in nineteen divisions and are subject to partisan elections by county voters every four years.

The Albuquerque Police Department (APD) is the chief law enforcement entity within city limits; the unincorporated area of Bernalillo County is policed primarily by the Bernalillo County Sheriff's Department. With approximately 1,000 sworn officers, APD is the largest municipal police department in New Mexico; in September 2008, it was the 49th largest police department in the country, according to the U.S. Department of Justice.

Albuquerque serves as the county seat of Bernalillo County. The City of Albuquerque and Bernalillo County share some social services, and have created a joint city-county commission called the Albuquerque Bernalillo County Government Commission (ABCGC). In 1986, the City of Albuquerque and Bernalillo County governments entered the joint powers agreement that created the Albuquerque/Bernalillo County Library System. The Bernalillo County Metropolitan Detention Center opened in 2003 and was jointly managed by the City of Albuquerque and Bernalillo County until 2006, and fully managed by Bernalillo County from 2006 to present.

== Economy ==
Albuquerque is New Mexico's principal economic center, accounting for half the state's economic activity. The city's economy is highly diversified, centering on science, medicine, technology, commerce, education, media, entertainment, and culture (particularly fine arts); construction, film production, and retail trade have seen the most robust growth since 2020.

Albuquerque is the center of the New Mexico Technology Corridor, a concentration of institutions engaged in scientific research and development, which in turn forms part of the larger Rio Grande Technology Corridor that stretches from southern Colorado to southwestern Texas. Major nodes within the corridor include federal installations such as Kirtland Air Force Base, Los Alamos National Laboratory, and Sandia National Laboratories; private healthcare facilities such as Lovelace Respiratory Research Institute and Presbyterian Health Services; academic institutions such as the University of New Mexico and Central New Mexico Community College; and private companies such as Intel (which has a fabrication site in neighboring Rio Rancho), Facebook (with a data center in Los Lunas), Northrop Grumman, passive solar energy company Zomeworks, and Tempur-Pedic. The city was also the founding location of MITS and Microsoft.

Beginning with the Manhattan Project in the 1940s, federal labs such as Los Alamos, Sandia, and Lawrence Livermore National Laboratory have cooperated on multidisciplinary research in the region; contractors for these facilities bring highly educated workers and researchers to an otherwise relatively isolated area, many of whom establish or work with local tech companies. The federal government spends roughly $4 billion annually in research and development in and around Albuquerque. Pursuant to the CHIPS and Science Act—federal legislation aimed at expanding domestic semiconductor manufacturing, research and development of new technology, and workforce training—the U.S. Department of Energy announced plans to construct a new 100,000-square-foot technology incubator for companies, academia, and national laboratories, as well as a new platform for facilitating the development of tech startups among minority communities.

The governments of Albuquerque and New Mexico have sought to attract more private investment into technology startups. The bioscience sector has experienced particularly robust growth, beginning with the 2013 opening of a BioScience Center in Uptown Albuquerque, which was the state's first private incubator for biotechnology startups; since then, New Mexico-based scientists have formed roughly 150 bioscience startups, many of which are based in the Albuquerque metropolitan area. In 2017, the state-funded Bioscience Authority was established to help promote local industry development, particularly through public-private partnerships; the following year, pharmaceutical company Curia built two large facilities in Albuquerque, and in fall 2022 broke ground on a $100 million expansion of its local operations.

Film studios have a major presence throughout New Mexico; Netflix maintains a major production hub at Albuquerque Studios. There are numerous shopping centers and malls within the city, including ABQ Uptown, Coronado, Cottonwood, Nob Hill, and Winrock. Outside city limits but surrounded by the city is a horse racing track and casino called The Downs Casino and Racetrack, and the pueblos surrounding the city feature resort casinos, including Sandia Resort, Santa Ana Star, Isleta Resort, and Laguna Pueblo's Route 66 Resort.

Largest employers in Albuquerque
1	Kirtland Air Force Base
2	University of New Mexico
3	Sandia National Laboratories
4	Albuquerque Public Schools
5	Presbyterian Healthcare Services
6	City of Albuquerque (Government)
7	Lovelace–Sandia Health System
8	Presbyterian Medical Services
9	Intel Corporation
10	State of New Mexico (Government)
11	Wal-Mart Stores, Inc.

== Education ==
Albuquerque is home to the University of New Mexico, the largest university in the state and the flagship of the state public university system. Central New Mexico Community College is a county-funded junior college serving new high school graduates and adults returning to school.

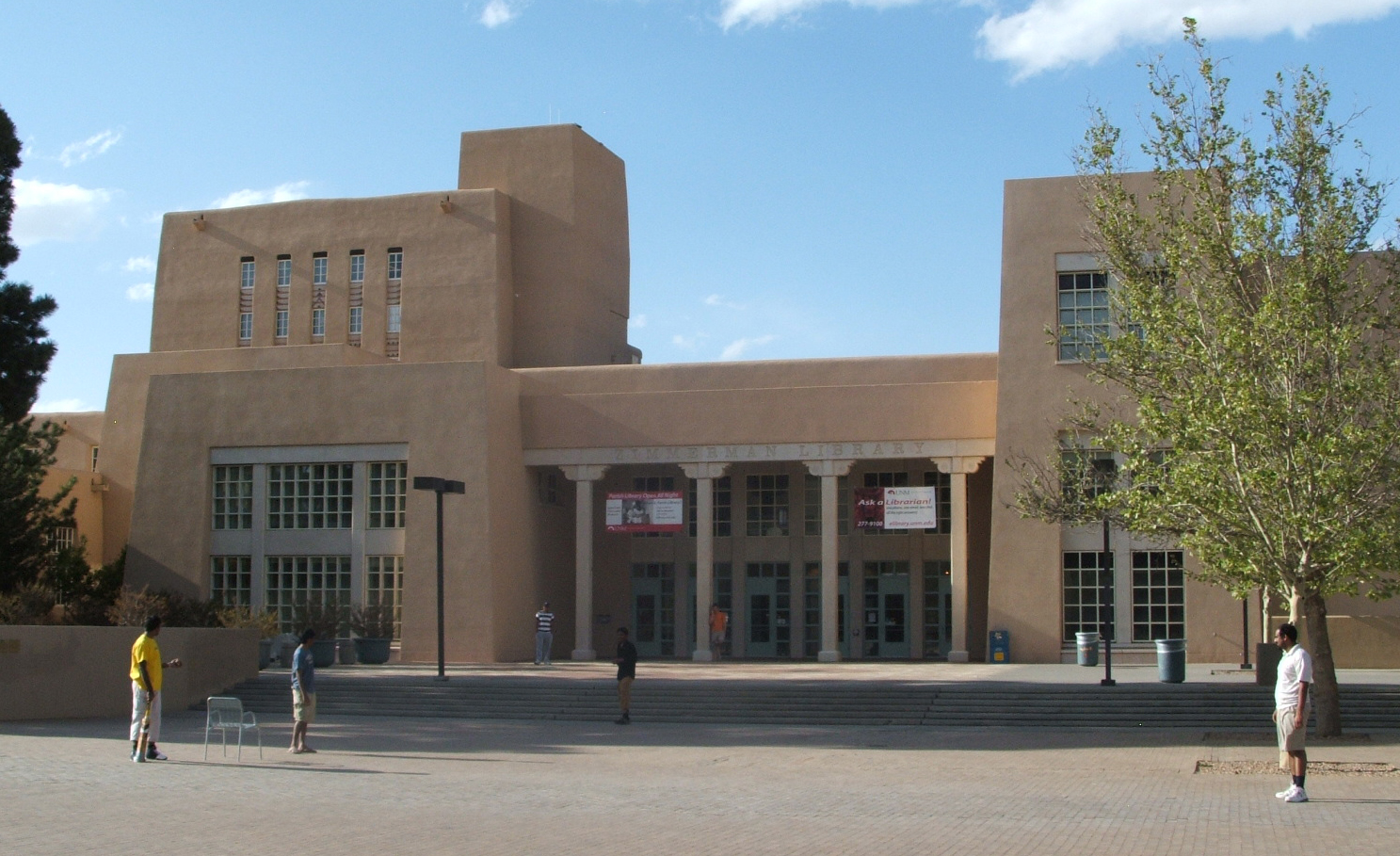
Zimmerman Library at University of New Mexico

Albuquerque hosts several programs and nonprofit schools of higher learning, including Southwest University of Visual Arts, Trinity Southwest University, the University of St. Francis College of Nursing and Allied Health Department of Physician Assistant Studies, and the St. Norbert College Master of Theological Studies program. Southwestern Indian Polytechnic Institute (SIPI) is in an unincorporated area adjacent to Albuquerque. The Ayurvedic Institute, one of the first Ayurveda colleges specializing in Ayurvedic medicine outside India, was established in 1984. Other state and nonprofit institutions of higher learning have moved some programs into Albuquerque; these include New Mexico State University, Highlands University, Lewis University, Wayland Baptist University, and Webster University. Several for-profit technical schools including Brookline College, Pima Medical Institute, Carrington College, National American University, Grand Canyon University, the University of Phoenix and several barber/beauty colleges have established their presence in the area.

Albuquerque Public Schools (APS) is the school district covering all of Albuquerque. Schools within APS include both public and charter entities. Numerous accredited private preparatory schools also serve Albuquerque students. These include various pre-high school religious (Christian, Jewish, Islamic) affiliates and Montessori schools, as well as Menaul School, Albuquerque Academy, St. Pius X High School, Sandia Preparatory School, the Bosque School, Evangel Christian Academy, Hope Christian School, Hope Connection School, Shepherd Lutheran School, Temple Baptist Academy, and Victory Christian. Accredited private schools serving students with special education needs in Albuquerque include: Desert Hills, Pathways Academy, and Presbyterian Ear Institute Oral School. The New Mexico School for the Deaf runs a preschool for children with hearing impairments in Albuquerque.

== Infrastructure ==
Since the city's founding, it has continued to be included on travel and trade routes including the historic El Camino Real, Santa Fe Railway (ATSF), Interstate 25 (I-40), I-40, New Mexico State Road 45, and Albuquerque International Sunport. Albuquerque is the second largest city in the United States (after Phoenix) to have at least two Interstate Highways, but no three-digit Interstates.

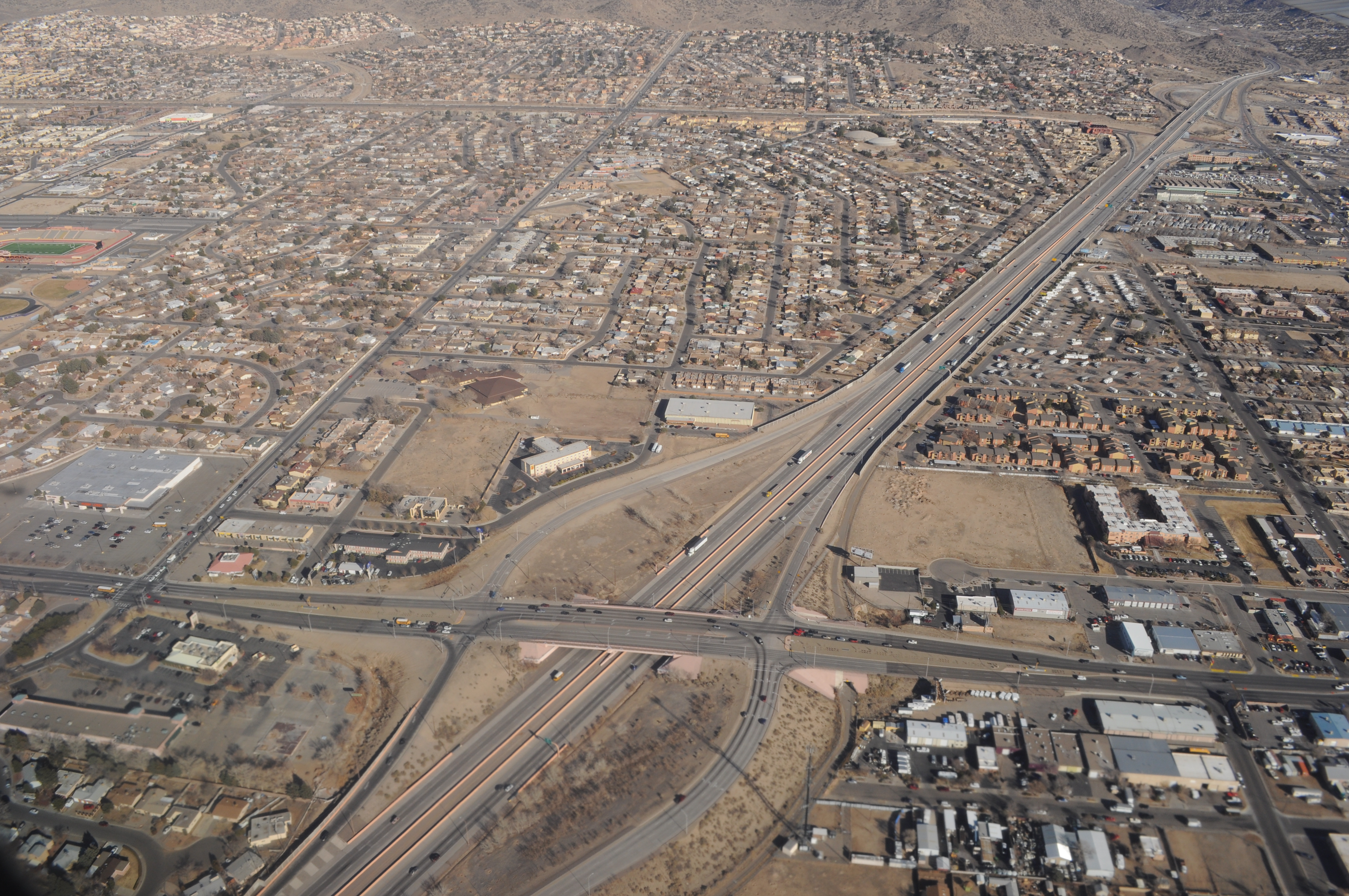
Aerial view of Interstate 40

=== Transportation ===
==== Main highways ====
Some of the main highways in the metro area include:

- Pan-American Freeway: More commonly known as Interstate 25 or "I-25", it is the main north–south highway on the city's eastern side of the Rio Grande. It is also the main north–south highway in the state (by connecting Albuquerque with Santa Fe and Las Cruces) and a plausible route of the eponymous Pan American Highway. Since US 66 was decommissioned in the 1980s, the only remaining US highway in Albuquerque, unsigned US-85, shares its alignment with I-25. US-550 splits off to the northwest from I-25/US-85 in Bernalillo.
- Coronado Freeway: More commonly known as Interstate 40 or "I-40", it is the city's main east–west traffic artery and an important transcontinental route. The freeway's name in the city is in reference to 16th century conquistador and explorer Francisco Vásquez de Coronado.
- Paseo del Norte: (aka; New Mexico State Highway 423): This 6-lane controlled-access highway is approximately five miles north of Interstate 40. It runs as a surface road with at-grade intersections from Tramway Boulevard (at the base of the Sandia Mountains) to Interstate 25, after which it continues as a controlled-access freeway through Los Ranchos de Albuquerque, over the Rio Grande to North Coors Boulevard. Paseo Del Norte then continues west as a surface road through the Petroglyph National Monument until it reaches Atrisco Vista Boulevard and the Double Eagle II Airport. The interchange with Interstate 25 was reconstructed in 2014 to improve traffic flow.
- Coors Boulevard: Coors is the main north–south artery to the west of the Rio Grande in Albuquerque. There is one full interchange where it connects with Interstate 40; The rest of the route connects to other roads with at-grade intersections controlled by stoplights. The Interstate 25 underpass has no access to Coors. Parts of the highway have sidewalks, bike lanes, and medians, but most sections have only dirt shoulders and a center turn lane. To the north of Interstate 40, part of the route is numbered as State Highway 448, while to the south, part of the route is numbered as State Highway 45.
- Rio Bravo Boulevard: The main river crossing between Westside Albuquerque and the Sunport, Rio Bravo is a four-lane divided highway that runs from University Boulevard in the east, through the South Valley, to Coors Boulevard in the west where it is contiguous with Dennis Chaves Boulevard. It follows NM-500 for its entire route.
- Central Avenue: Central is one of the historical routings of US 66, it is no longer a main through highway, its usefulness having been supplanted by Interstate 40.
- Alameda Boulevard: The main road between Rio Rancho and North Albuquerque, Alameda Boulevard stretches from Tramway Road to Coors Boulevard The route is designated as the eastern portion of NM-528.
- Tramway Boulevard: Serves as a bypass around the northeastern quadrant, the route is designated as NM-556. Tramway Boulevard starts at I-25 near Sandia Pueblo, and heads east as a two-lane road. It turns south near the base of the Sandia Peak Tramway and becomes an expressway-type divided highway until its terminus near I-40 and Central Avenue by the western entrance to Tijeras Canyon.

The interchange between I-40 and I-25 is known as the "Big I". Originally built in 1966, it was rebuilt in 2002. The Big I is the only five-level stack interchange in the state of New Mexico.

==== Bridges ====
There are six road bridges that cross the Rio Grande and serve the municipality on at least one end if not both. The eastern approaches of the northernmost three all pass through adjacent unincorporated areas, the Village of Los Ranchos de Albuquerque, or the North Valley. In downstream order they are:

- Alameda Bridge
- Paseo del Norte Bridge
- Montaño Bridge
- I-40 Bridge
- Central at Old Town Bridge
- Barelas Bridge

Two more bridges serve urbanized areas contiguous to the city's perforated southern boundary.

- Rio Bravo Bridge (NM-500)
- I-25 Bridge (near Isleta Pueblo)

==== Rail ====
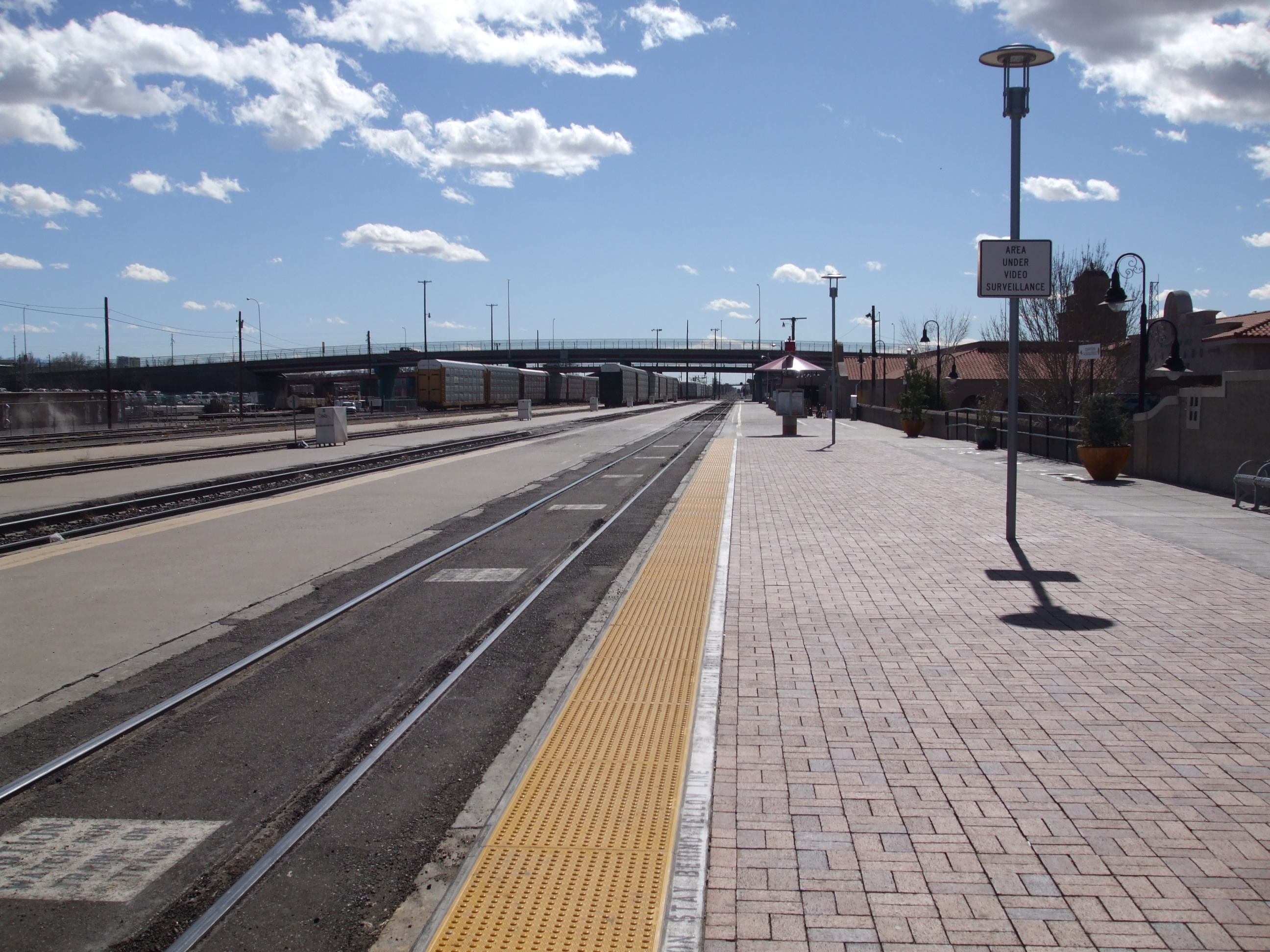
Rail Runner Express Downtown Albuquerque station train platform

The state owns most of the city's rail infrastructure which is used by a commuter rail system, long-distance passenger trains, and the freight trains of the BNSF Railway.

==== Freight service ====
BNSF Railway operates a small yard operation out of Abajo yard, located just south of the César E. Chávez Ave. overpass and the New Mexico Rail Runner Express yards. Most freight traffic through the Central New Mexico region is processed via a much larger hub in nearby Belen, New Mexico.

==== Intercity rail ====
Amtrak's Southwest Chief, which travels between Chicago and Los Angeles, serves the Albuquerque area daily with one stop in each direction at the Alvarado Transportation Center in downtown.

==== Intercity Bus Services ====
Greyhound Lines and FlixBus offer intercity transportation services to the Albuquerque Metro Area as well as transportation to other cities around the United States.

==== Commuter rail ====
The New Mexico Rail Runner Express, a commuter rail line, began service between Sandoval County and Albuquerque in July 2006 using an existing BNSF right-of-way which was purchased by New Mexico in 2005. Service expanded to Valencia County in December 2006 and to Santa Fe on December 17, 2008. Rail Runner now connects Santa Fe, Sandoval, Bernalillo, and Valencia Counties with thirteen station stops, including three stops within Albuquerque. The trains connect Albuquerque to downtown Santa Fe with eight roundtrips per weekday. The section of the line running south to Belen is served less frequently.

==== Local mass transit ====
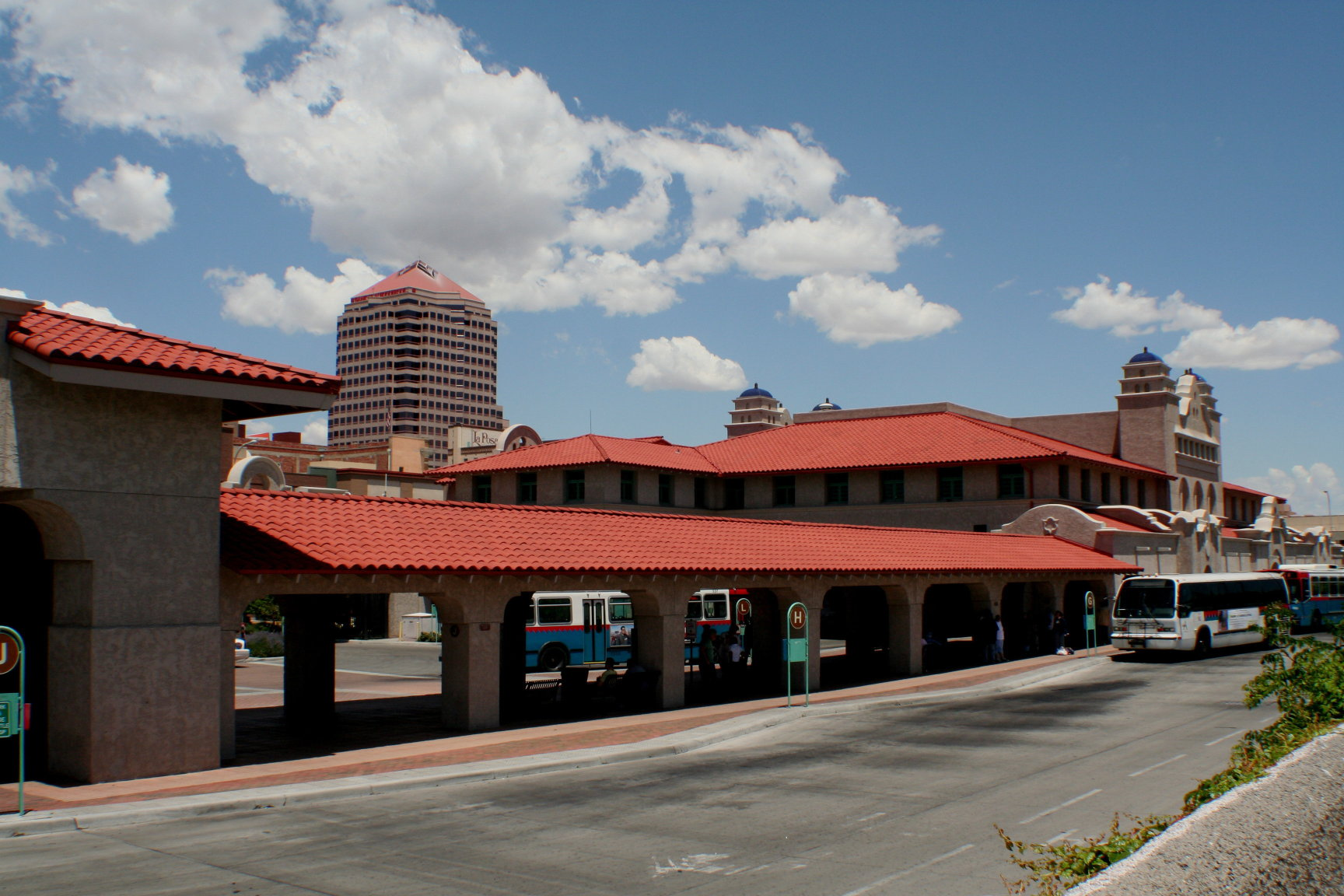
Alvarado Transportation Center, an intermodal transportation hub in downtown Albuquerque

The primary mass transit system is ABQ RIDE, which operates a variety of bus routes throughout the city, including the Albuquerque Rapid Transit (ART) express bus service. The central nexus for public transportation is the Alvarado Transportation System, which connects ABQ RIDE to Amtrak, Greyhound Lines, and the New Mexico Rail Runner Express commuter rail.

ART logo

In 2011, the City of Albuquerque commissioned a study to develop a bus rapid transit system through the Central Avenue corridor, which accounted for 44% of all bus riders in ABQ RIDE. Construction began in 2017 on Albuquerque Rapid Transit (ART), including dedicated bus lanes between Coors and Louisiana Boulevards. ART opened for service in November 2019 and was free to use until January 1, 2020.

Albuquerque was one of two cities in New Mexico to have had an electric street railway; its horse-drawn streetcar lines were electrified in the early 20th century. The Albuquerque Traction Company assumed operation of the system in 1905, and it grew to its maximum length of 6 miles (9.7 km) over the next ten years, connecting destinations such as Old Town to the west and the University of New Mexico to the east with the town's urban center near the former Atchison, Topeka & Santa Fe Railway depot. The Albuquerque Traction Company failed financially in 1915 and the City Electric Company was formed in its place. Despite traffic booms during the First World War, and unaided by lawsuits attempting to force the streetcar company to pay for paving, that system also failed later in 1927, leaving the streetcar's "motorettes" unemployed.

In 2006, under Mayor Martin Chavez, Albuquerque planned a "fast track" development of a "Modern Streetcar" project, which would run mostly in the southeast quadrant on Central Avenue and Yale Boulevard. Funding for the $270 million system failed amid vocal opposition from some residents.

=== Bicycle transit ===
Albuquerque has a well-developed network of trails, bicycle routes, and paths totaling over 400 miles. A 2021 study by Walk Score ranked it 26th out of 130 U.S. cities in bike friendliness, based on indicators such infrastructure, terrain, and connectivity. In 2009, Albuquerque opened its first Bicycle Boulevard on Silver Avenue. In 2015, the city adopted the "Bikeway & Trails Facility Plan" to invest in its bicycle infrastructure, including improving and expanding the existing system, adding new routes, and establishing bike sharing programs.

=== Walkability ===
A 2011 study by Walk Score ranked Albuquerque as the 28th-most walkable of the fifty largest U.S. cities, indicating below average performance in metrics such as access to public transit and proximity to people or amenities. A follow-up study a decade later ranked the city 73rd out of 130 cities nationwide, with a walkability score of 42.6 compared to an average of 48, classifying it as "car-dependent".

=== Airports ===
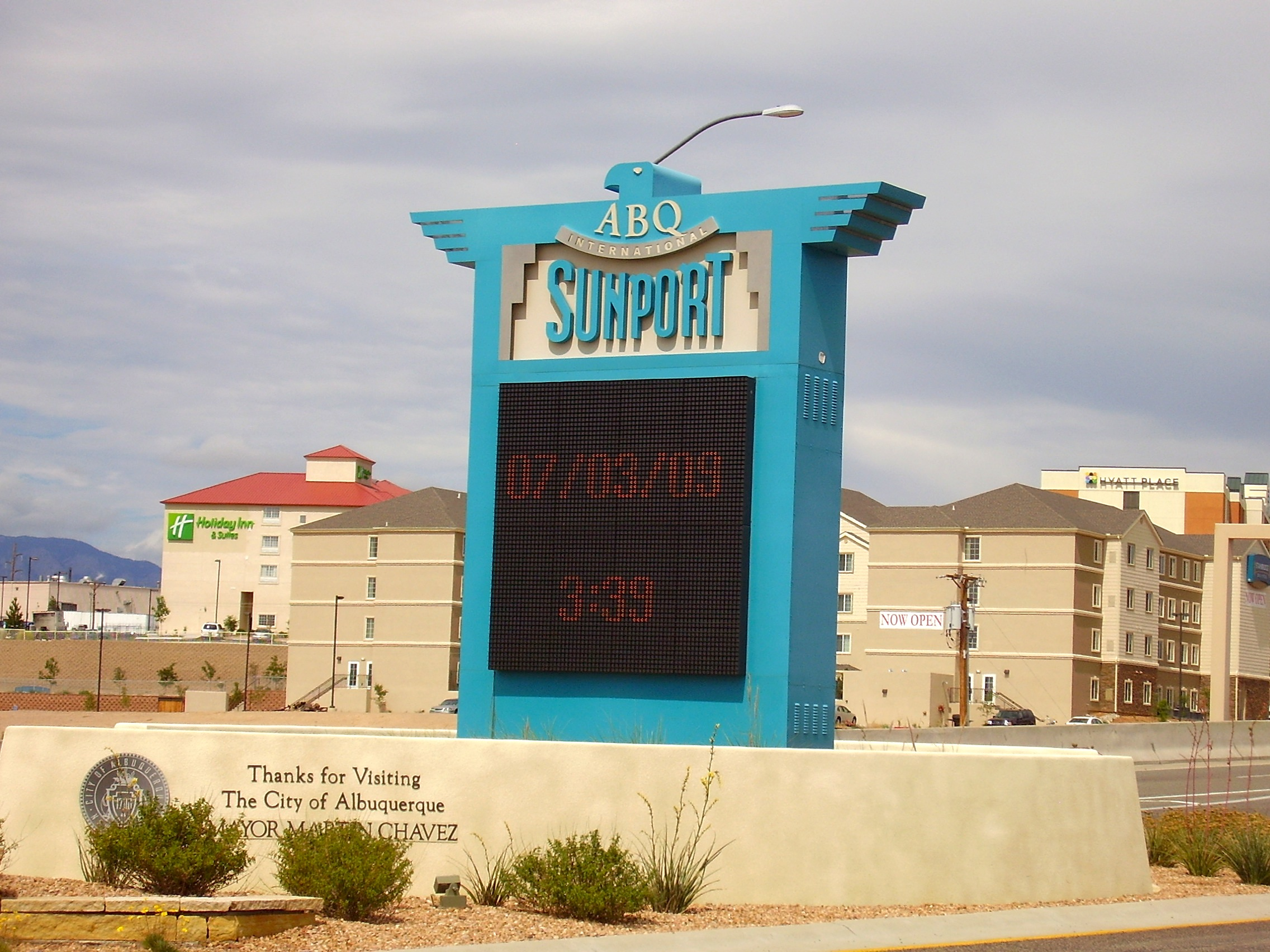
Albuquerque International Sunport

Albuquerque is served primarily by the Albuquerque International Sunport, located 3 mi (4.8 km) southeast of the city's central business district. It is the largest airport in New Mexico and the state's sole international airport, serving over 5 million passengers per year. The city owns and operates the much smaller Double Eagle II Airport, which is primarily used for air ambulances, corporate flights, military flights, charter flights, aviation training, and private flights.

=== Utilities ===
==== Energy ====
PNM Resources, New Mexico's largest electricity provider, is based in Albuquerque. They serve about 487,000 electricity customers statewide. In September 2021, PNM entered final merger talks with Avangrid, the U.S. subsidiary of Spanish power giant Iberdrola. New Mexico Gas Company, a subsidiary of Canadian utility company Emera, provides natural gas services to more than 540,000 customers in the state, including the Albuquerque metro area.

==== Sanitation ====
The Albuquerque Bernalillo County Water Utility Authority is responsible for the delivery of drinking water and the treatment of wastewater. Trash and recycling in the city are managed by the City of Albuquerque Solid Waste Management Department.

South Side Water Reclamation Plant.

=== Healthcare ===
Albuquerque is the medical hub of New Mexico, hosting numerous medical centers. The University of New Mexico Hospital is the largest hospital in New Mexico with 628 licensed beds and is the primary teaching hospital for the University of New Mexico School of Medicine, the state's only medical school. It provides a large residency training program in the state, one of many; a children's hospital, burn center, and level I pediatric and adult trauma centers, as well as a certified advanced primary stroke center and the largest collection of adult and pediatric specialty and subspecialty programs in the state. Albuquerque's other largest hospitals are Presbyterian Hospital (Presbyterian Healthcare Services) with 543 licensed beds, Raymond G. Murphy VA Medical Center (Veterans Health Administration) with 298 beds, and Lovelace Medical Center (Lovelace Health System) with 263 beds. Smaller specialty hospitals include the Heart Hospital of New Mexico and Lovelace Women's Hospital.

== Sister cities ==
Albuquerque has 11 sister cities, as designated by Sister Cities International:

- Alburquerque, Spain
- Ashgabat, Turkmenistan
- Chihuahua, Mexico
- Guadalajara, Mexico
- Helmstedt, Germany
- Hualien, Taiwan
- Lanzhou, China
- Lusaka, Zambia
- Rehovot, Israel
- Sasebo, Japan
- Kharkiv, Ukraine

== See also ==
- Alburquerque, Spain
- List of municipalities in New Mexico
- National Old Trails Road
- Breaking Bad, Better Call Saul, and Pluribus, TV shows set in Albuquerque
- Albuquerque (song) 1999 song by "Weird Al" Yankovic named for and set primarily in Albuquerque
