= Sunshine Building =

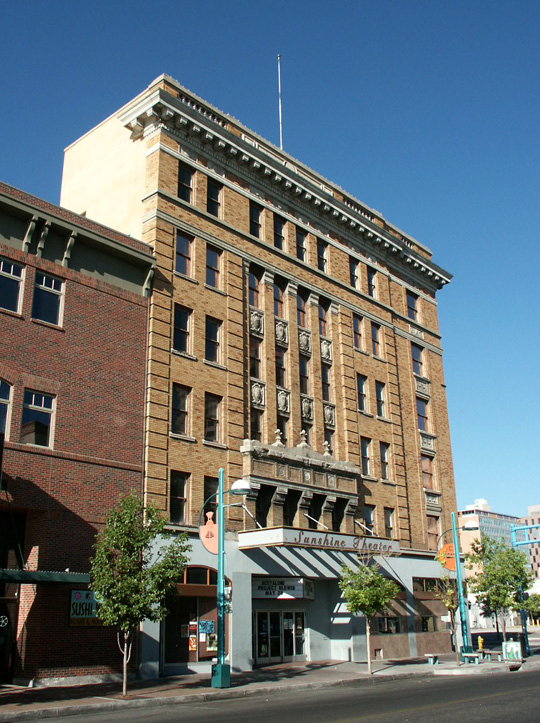
- Central Ave. facade
- Interactive map of Sunshine Building
- Location: 120 Central Ave. SW; Albuquerque, New Mexico
- Coordinates: 35.084237°N 106.649008°W
- Built: 1924
- Architect: Trost & Trost
- Architectural style: Renaissance Revival

NM State Register of Cultural Properties
- Designated: March 8, 1985
- Reference no.: 1170

Albuquerque Historic Landmark

The Sunshine Building is a historic six-story building in downtown Albuquerque, New Mexico. It was built in 1924 by local theater owner Joseph Barnett and houses the Sunshine Theater as well as commercial space and offices. The Sunshine operated primarily as a movie theater until the 1980s, though it was also equipped for Vaudeville shows and other live performances. Since 1990 it has operated as a live music venue, hosting many notable acts. The building was listed on the New Mexico State Register of Cultural Properties in 1985 and is also an Albuquerque City Landmark.

The building was designed by the El Paso firm of Trost & Trost and is of reinforced concrete construction with a facade of yellow brick. The architectural style is Renaissance Revival. The building was known for having what was believed to be the last manually operated elevator in New Mexico.

One of the building's longest running commercial tenants was F. D. Fogg and Company, a local jeweler which operated there from 1948 to 1985. The company closed in 2004 after 83 years in business.

The TV Show In Plain Sight filmed the exterior of this location, as the fictional office of the US Marshals' Witness Protection Service.

== History ==
The Sunshine Building was built in 1923–24 by Joseph Barnett (1866–1954), an Italian-American businessman who arrived in Albuquerque penniless in 1896 and worked his way up through the saloon and theater business to become one of the city's largest property owners. By the 1920s, Barnett already owned two theaters in the city, the B at 200 West Central and the Lyric at 312 West Central, but planned an even larger one for his new building along with five floors of offices. The building was constructed on the former site of the White Elephant building, a two-story adobe structure dating to 1881 which once housed a popular gambling hall and saloon. The Sunshine Building was designed by the El Paso firm of Trost & Trost, which was also responsible for several other buildings in the immediate area including the Rosenwald Building, Occidental Life Building, and First National Bank Building.

The Sunshine Theater opened on May 1, 1924, with a showing of the Ramón Novarro film Scaramouche. With a seating capacity of 1,200, central heating and cooling, and fireproof reinforced concrete construction, it was advertised as "the most modern and beautiful theater in the southwest" and was considered Albuquerque's first movie palace. The Albuquerque Journal reported that the opening was a "grand success" with the theater filled to capacity for multiple showings. The theater was equipped for both films and live performances, including the traveling Vaudeville shows that were popular in the 1920s. The building also contained 73 office rooms on the upper stories and five ground-floor commercial spaces.

In 1935, Barnett merged his theater interests with those of the Bachechi family, including the KiMo Theater, which put most of Albuquerque's theaters under the same ownership. By 1952, the chain, Albuquerque Exhibitors, controlled 10 local theaters and had 170 employees. The company leased its theaters in 1956 to the Texas-based Frontier Theaters chain, which was taken over by Commonwealth Theaters in 1967. Commonwealth chose not to renew its lease on the Sunshine when the original lease expired in 1974, citing a lack of customers, and the theater stopped showing first-run films. Later it switched to classic 1930s and 1940s movies, then Spanish-language films.

In 1983, the Sunshine Building was proposed for demolition in order to build a 12-acre (4.9 ha) "Festival Marketplace" development. Supporters of the project believed it would revitalize the mostly vacant area around First and Central, while preservationists opposed the demolition and organized a "Save the Sunshine" committee. The debate was reported in the National Trust for Historic Preservation's national Preservation News publication in 1984. Ultimately, the project was abandoned. In 1990, the Sunshine Theater was converted into a live music venue. One of the first acts to perform there was Soundgarden (mistakenly identified as "Sound Garden" in the local press) on February 14, 1990. The theater has remained one of Albuquerque's most popular mid-size concert venues and continues to host live music as of 2026.

== Architecture ==
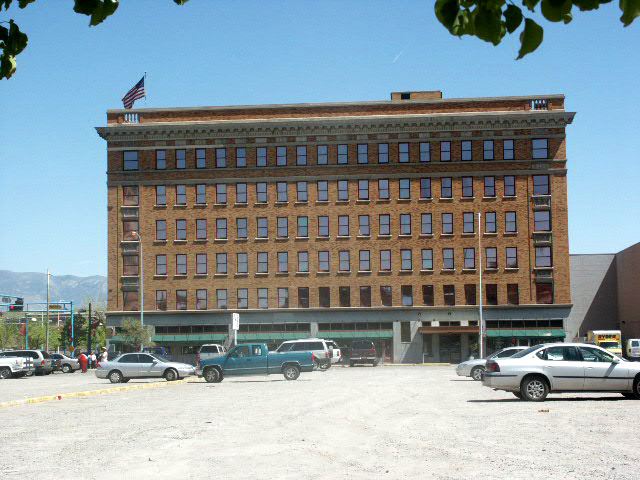
The Second Street facade (west side) of the Sunshine Building

The Sunshine Building is a six-story, concrete-framed structure at the southeast corner of Second Street and Central Avenue. The building is 85 feet (26 m) tall and has a footprint of 75 by 140 feet (23 by 43 m). It is faced with marble on the ground floor and yellow brick on the upper levels. The architecture is usually identified as Renaissance Revival, with decorative brickwork and pilasters, a heavy cornice, and a balustraded parapet. The building is further decorated with swags, medallions, and other ornaments. Like the nearby First National Bank Building, the Sunshine Building was constructed with blank walls on two sides to accommodate neighboring structures. By the time of the 1980s Festival Marketplace controversy, the building was the only structure left on the block and its detractors criticized the "not so handsome" wall greeting traffic entering Downtown. In 2001, the Century Theatres Downtown building was built next to the Sunshine, obscuring the blank walls.

The building has ground-floor commercial space and five floors of offices wrapped around the central theater space. In its original configuration, the theater had 800 orchestra seats and 400 balcony seats, though most of the seating was removed when it was converted for live music use. The proscenium arch is 27 feet (8.2 m) wide by 24 feet (7.3 m) high, and the fly gallery has a height of 52 feet (16 m) from the stage to the grid deck. The balcony is reached from staircases on either side of the theater, with a mezzanine containing restrooms. The office section has a separate entrance lobby opening onto Second Street. The building was notable for having what was believed to be the last manually operated elevator in New Mexico, which was staffed by elevator operators until at least 1989.

== Sunshine Theater ==
The Sunshine Theater, which occupies a significant portion of the building, operated as a movie theater from 1924 until the 1980s and has since been remodeled into a popular live music venue. The Sunshine Theater has hosted a number of notable acts such as The Strokes, Snoop Dogg, Soulfly, Deltron 3030, Stone Temple Pilots, The Smashing Pumpkins, Queens of the Stone Age, The Dead Weather, Arctic Monkeys, Modest Mouse, Rancid, Coheed and Cambria, Awolnation, Cannibal Corpse, Ratatat, Social Distortion, Pennywise, Hollywood Undead, Deftones, Nightwish, Melanie Martinez, Damian Marley and Deadmau5 among others. The Sunshine Theater's set up is an open floor, a large balcony, and a bar that seats a 21 and older audience, in all they accommodate about 1,000 people. The theater is the most popular venue in the Albuquerque metro area to accommodate smaller but still notable acts, many with five or more shows in one month. The band Soulfly with Max Cavalera was given the key to the city at the venue, on January 28, 2023, by Albuquerque Mayor Tim Keller (politician).
