= AT&SF Freight Office =

- U.S. National Register of Historic Places
- NM State Register of Cultural Properties
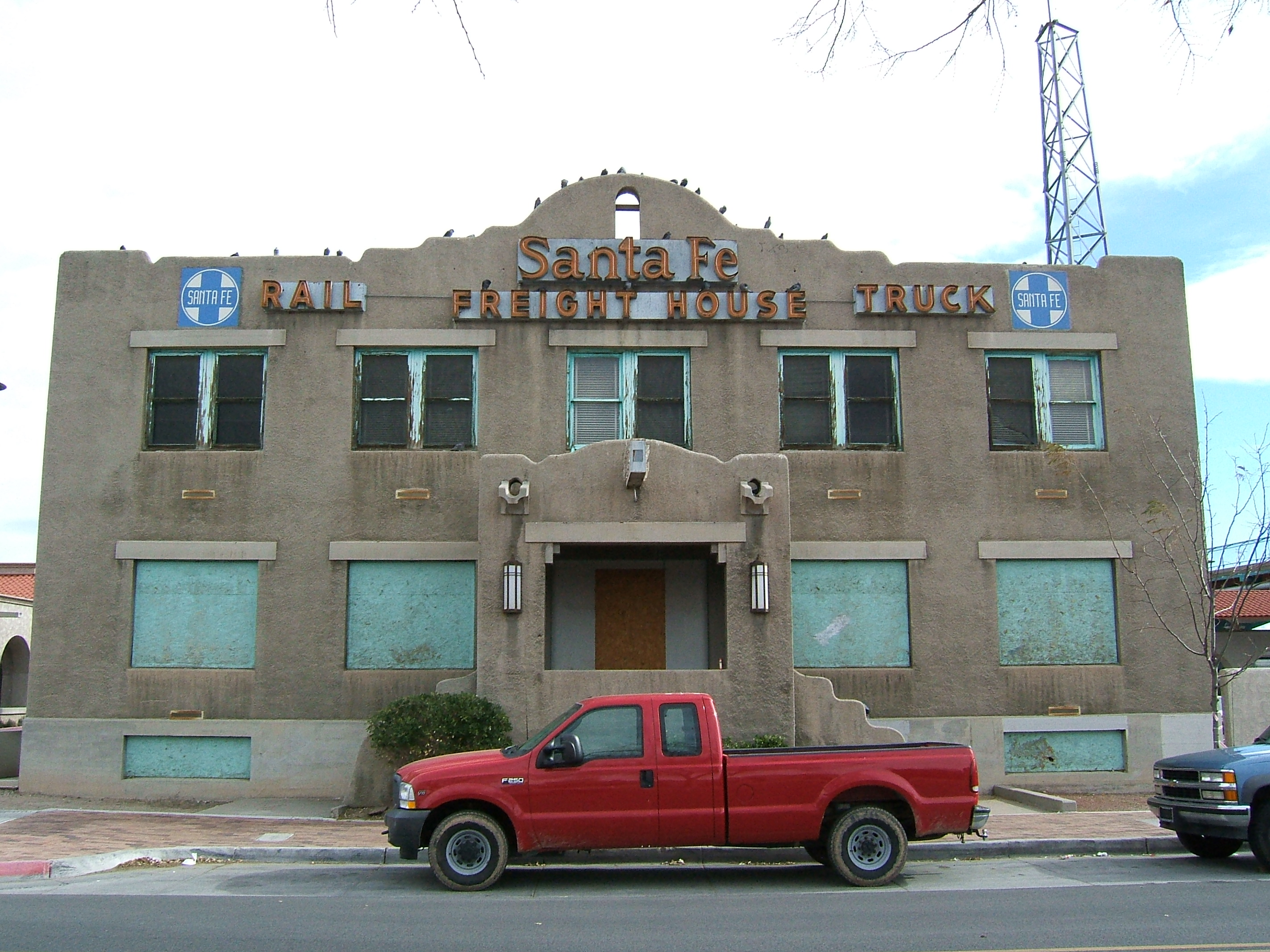
- AT&SF Freight Office, December 2007

- Location within New Mexico Location within the United States
- Location: 314 1st St. SW, Albuquerque, New Mexico
- Coordinates: 35°4′54″N 106°38′54″W
- Built: 1946
- Architectural style: Mission Revival
- NRHP reference No.: 13000971
- NMSRCP No.: 1991

Significant dates
- Added to NRHP: December 24, 2013
- Designated NMSRCP: December 14, 2012

The AT&SF Freight Office is a historic building in Downtown Albuquerque, New Mexico. It was built by the Atchison, Topeka and Santa Fe Railway in 1946 and is a notable example of Mission Revival architecture. The building was listed on the New Mexico State Register of Cultural Properties in 2012 and the National Register of Historic Places in 2013.

The Freight Office was built as part of the modernization of the AT&SF freight handling facilities, which also included a much larger wood-framed freight warehouse which extended 450 feet (140 m) south to the Coal Avenue viaduct. The warehouse and its associated loading platform were demolished in the 1980s when the railroad moved its regional freight operations to Belen. The Freight Office survived and is currently part of the Alvarado Transportation Center property, though vacant.

The building is two stories high with a basement and was designed in a stripped-down Mission style to harmonize with adjacent railroad buildings including the depot and the Alvarado Hotel, both no longer standing. It is built from structural clay tile with a concrete frame, and the exterior is finished with pebble-dash stucco. The front elevation of the building includes a flat-roofed entry porch, wood-framed sash windows with heavy concrete lintels, and original neon signs.
