= El Vado Auto Court =

- U.S. National Register of Historic Places
- NM State Register of Cultural Properties
- Albuquerque Historic Landmark
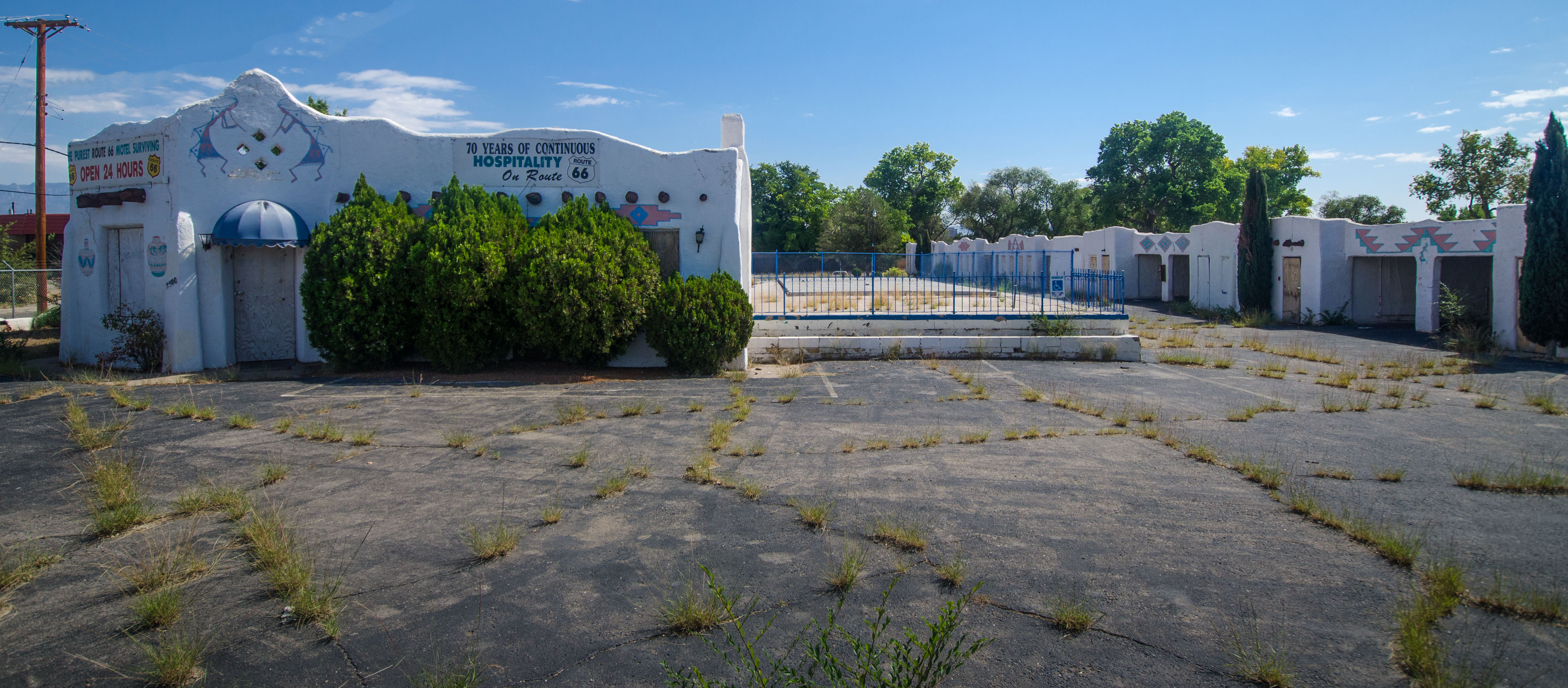
- The motel in 2012, before renovations

- Location within New Mexico
- Location: 2500 Central Ave. SW, Albuquerque, New Mexico
- Coordinates: 35°05′39″N 106°40′36″W
- Area: less than one acre
- Built: 1937
- Architectural style: Pueblo Revival
- MPS: Route 66 through New Mexico MPS
- NRHP reference No.: 93001214
- NMSRCP No.: 1570

Significant dates
- Added to NRHP: November 22, 1993
- Designated NMSRCP: September 17, 1993

The El Vado Auto Court is a historic motel in Albuquerque, New Mexico, located along former U.S. Route 66. Built in 1937, it operated until 2005 and reopened in 2018 after renovations. The motel was listed on the New Mexico State Register of Cultural Properties and National Register of Historic Places in 1993, and was also designated an Albuquerque city landmark in 2008.

After nearly 70 years in business, El Vado was purchased in 2005 by a new owner who intended to clear the site for redevelopment. After a lengthy legal battle, the motel was designated a landmark by the Albuquerque City Council, granting it a measure of protection. Ultimately the property was sold to the city in 2010, launching the renovation efforts.

The motel consists of a pair of long, one-story buildings separated by a landscaped courtyard (originally a parking lot). It is an example of Pueblo Revival architecture, with stepped massing, irregular parapets, vigas, and buttressed, stuccoed walls. The 2016–18 renovations added a new swimming pool as well as several small retail spaces and a tap room.
