= Alvarado Hotel =

- Formerly listed on the U.S. National Register of Historic Places
- Formerly listed on the New Mexico State Register of Cultural Properties
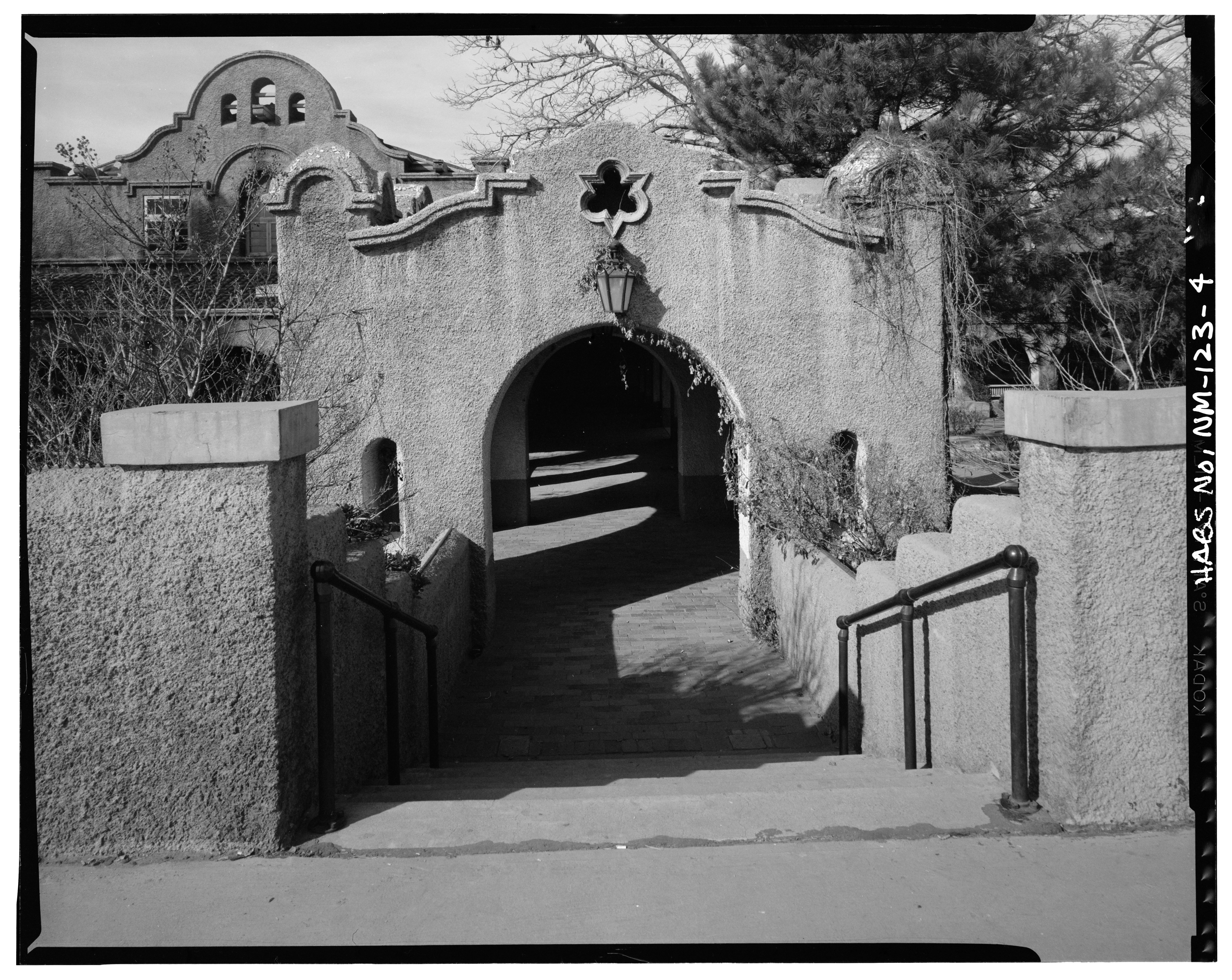
- Alvarado Hotel, entrance to main courtyard

- Location within New Mexico Location within the United States
- Location: 110 1st St. SW, Albuquerque, New Mexico
- Coordinates: 35°05′00″N 106°38′52″W
- Built: 1902
- Architect: Charles Frederick Whittlesey
- Architectural style: Mission Revival
- NRHP reference No.: 70000902
- NMSRCP No.: 53

Significant dates
- Added to NRHP: March 3, 1970
- Designated NMSRCP: May 23, 1969
- Removed from NRHP: August 4, 1970
- Delisted NMSRCP: August 4, 1970

The Alvarado Hotel was a historic railroad hotel which was one of the most famous landmarks of Albuquerque, New Mexico. It was built in 1901–02 by the Atchison, Topeka and Santa Fe Railway and was operated by the Fred Harvey Company until 1970. With 120 guest rooms, it was the largest of all the Harvey hotels. Its demolition by the railroad in 1970 was described by preservationist Susan Dewitt as "the most serious loss of a landmark the city has sustained" and helped mobilize stronger support for historic preservation efforts in the city.

The hotel was designed by Charles Frederick Whittlesey in the Mission Revival style and was part of a larger complex of railroad buildings including the Santa Fe Depot, which burned down in 1993, and the still-extant Freight Office. The former hotel site is now occupied by the Alvarado Transportation Center, which opened in 2002.

== History ==
The Alvarado was one of several Harvey House hotels built by the Atchison, Topeka and Santa Fe Railway along its route in the early 1900s, along with the Castañeda in Las Vegas, New Mexico, El Tovar at the Grand Canyon, El Garces in Needles, California, and Casa del Desierto in Barstow, California, among others. The hotel was designed by Charles Frederick Whittlesey, who also designed El Tovar, and officially opened on May 10, 1902. It was named after Hernando de Alvarado, a lieutenant under Francisco Vázquez de Coronado on his 1540 expedition into New Mexico. The original hotel had 100 guest rooms, 20 bathrooms, a 70-by-40-foot (21 by 12 m) dining room, lunch counter, barber shop, men's and women's parlors, club room, reading rooms, and an "Indian Building" where tourists could buy southwestern curios.

In 1922, the hotel was remodeled and expanded, bringing the total number of rooms to 120, and adding bathrooms to existing rooms that lacked them. Landscaping and fountains were also added to the exterior courtyards, and the interior public spaces were redesigned and redecorated by architect Mary Colter. When the project was completed, the Alvarado was the largest of all the Harvey hotels. For many travelers, the hotel was their introduction to the American Southwest, and writer Lawrence Clark Powell described it as the region's "heart of hearts". It was also an important social center for Albuquerque, hosting a variety of events including the annual Montezuma Ball.

By the 1960s, the Alvarado was one of the last Harvey hotels still operating and was in disrepair. Despite rumors that it would soon be demolished, little action was taken by the city to preserve the property, though it was listed on the New Mexico State Register of Cultural Properties in 1969 and the National Register of Historic Places in 1970. In September, 1969, ATSF announced its plan to close the hotel on January 2, 1970, and then demolish it. The railroad offered instead to sell the property to the city, but only at a price of $1.5 million which was far above the appraised value of $600,000. In the end there was not sufficient interest or willpower from the city government or residents to save the hotel, and it was demolished as planned starting on February 2, 1970. New Mexico Architecture magazine marked its passing with an article which concluded, simply, "¡El Alvarado Está Muerto!"

The demolition of the hotel has subsequently been recognized as one of Albuquerque's greatest architectural losses, with one architect saying it "has truly haunted New Mexico." Although the hotel was not saved, its demolition spurred significantly greater community support for subsequent preservation efforts in Albuquerque, and led to the establishment of the Albuquerque Conservation Association and the city Historic Landmarks Survey. The site of the Alvarado was used as a parking lot until 2002, when a multi-modal transit hub, the Alvarado Transportation Center, was completed. The transportation center was designed to resemble the former hotel, borrowing many of its Mission Revival design elements.

== Architecture ==
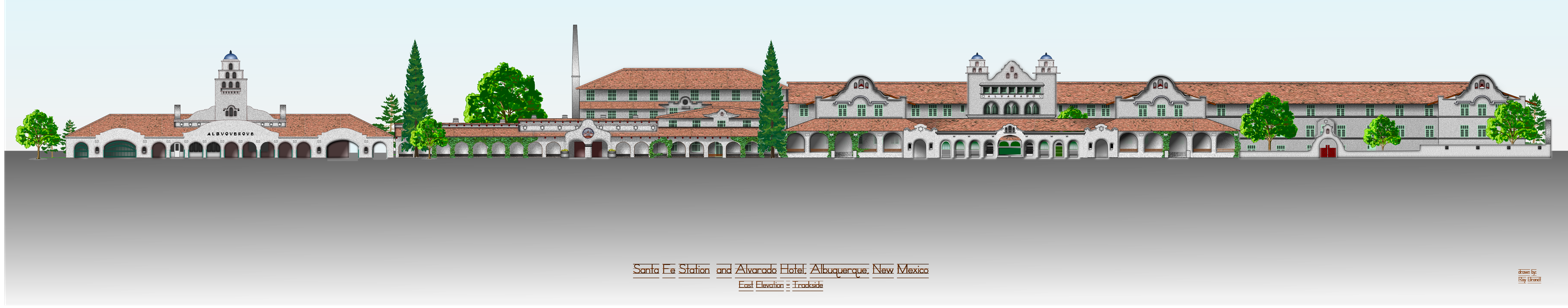
Illustration depicting the east (front) elevation of the Santa Fe Depot (left) and Alvarado Hotel (right)

The Alvarado was a sprawling, three-story building designed in the Mission Revival style. It was situated at the corner of First Street and Central Avenue, at the northern end of a four-block complex of railroad buildings that also included the Santa Fe Depot, the still-extant Freight House (1946), Curio Store (1912), and Telegraph Office (1914), and several others. It was of wood-framed construction with tiled roofs and a rough, gray stucco exterior applied to a layer of steel lath. The main hotel block was E-shaped with three protruding wings, each with a curved Mission-style gable, fronting on the adjoining railroad tracks. Two interior courtyards between the wings of the hotel were enclosed by arcades which also connected to the Indian Building, depot, and other outbuildings. A pediment with a curved gable flanked by two stepped towers marked the main entrance of the hotel.
