= Barelas Community Center =

- U.S. National Register of Historic Places
- NM State Register of Cultural Properties
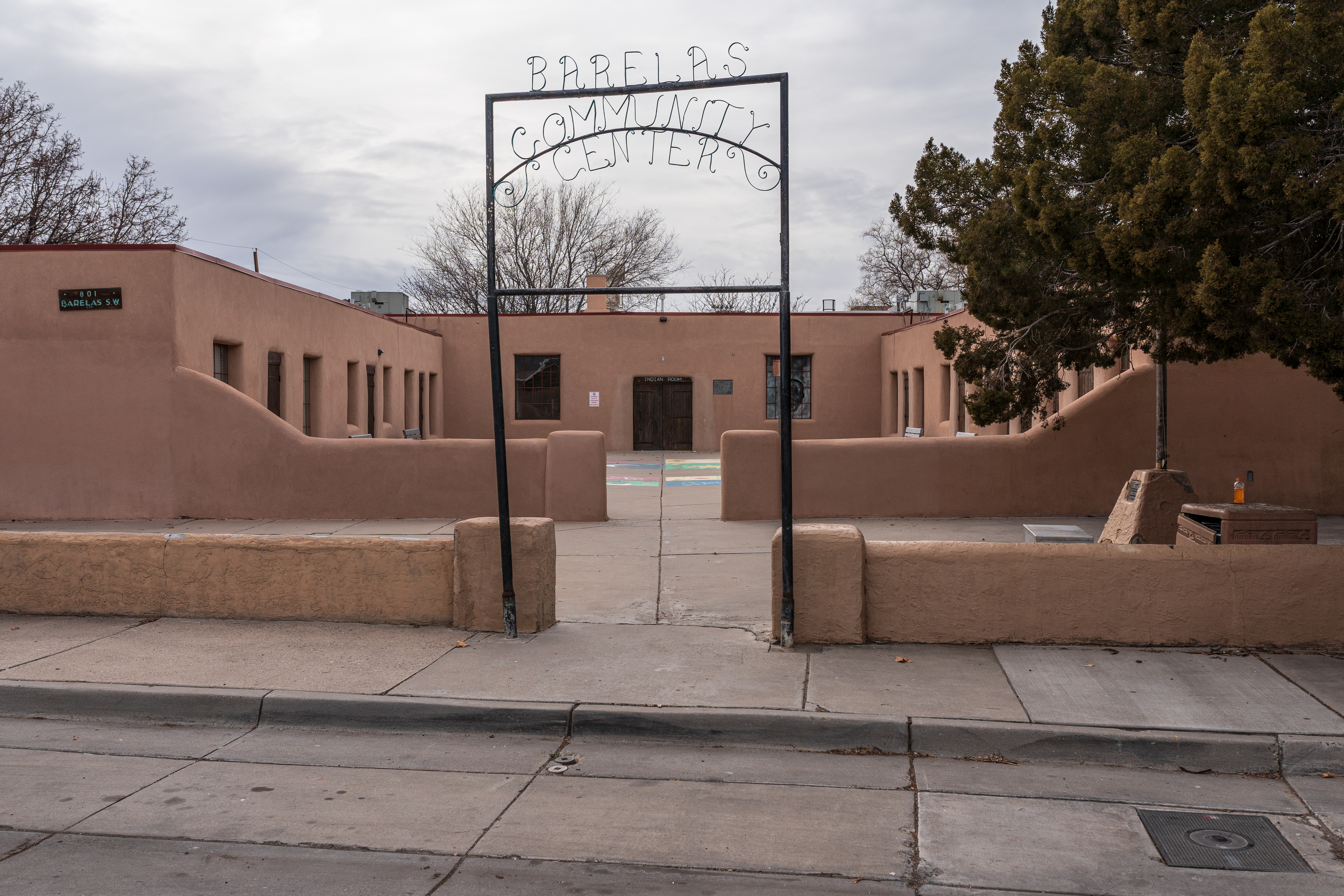
- Barelas Community Center in 2023
- Location: 801 Barelas Rd. SW, Albuquerque, New Mexico
- Coordinates: 35°4′40″N 106°39′23″W
- Built: 1942
- Architect: A. W. Boehning
- NRHP reference No.: 100007239
- NMSRCP No.: 2068

Significant dates
- Added to NRHP: December 9, 2021
- Designated NMSRCP: October 8, 2021

The Barelas Community Center is a historic community center in the Barelas neighborhood of Albuquerque, New Mexico. It was built from 1940 to 1942 by the National Youth Administration (NYA), a New Deal agency which provided jobs and vocational training for young Americans. The NYA completed the Heights Community Center in 1940 and immediately started work on a second center, in cooperation with the League of United Latin American Citizens (LULAC), to serve the majority-Hispanic Barelas neighborhood. It was dedicated during the LULAC national convention in June, 1942. Heights and Barelas were the first two community centers in the city, and both are still in use as of 2021.

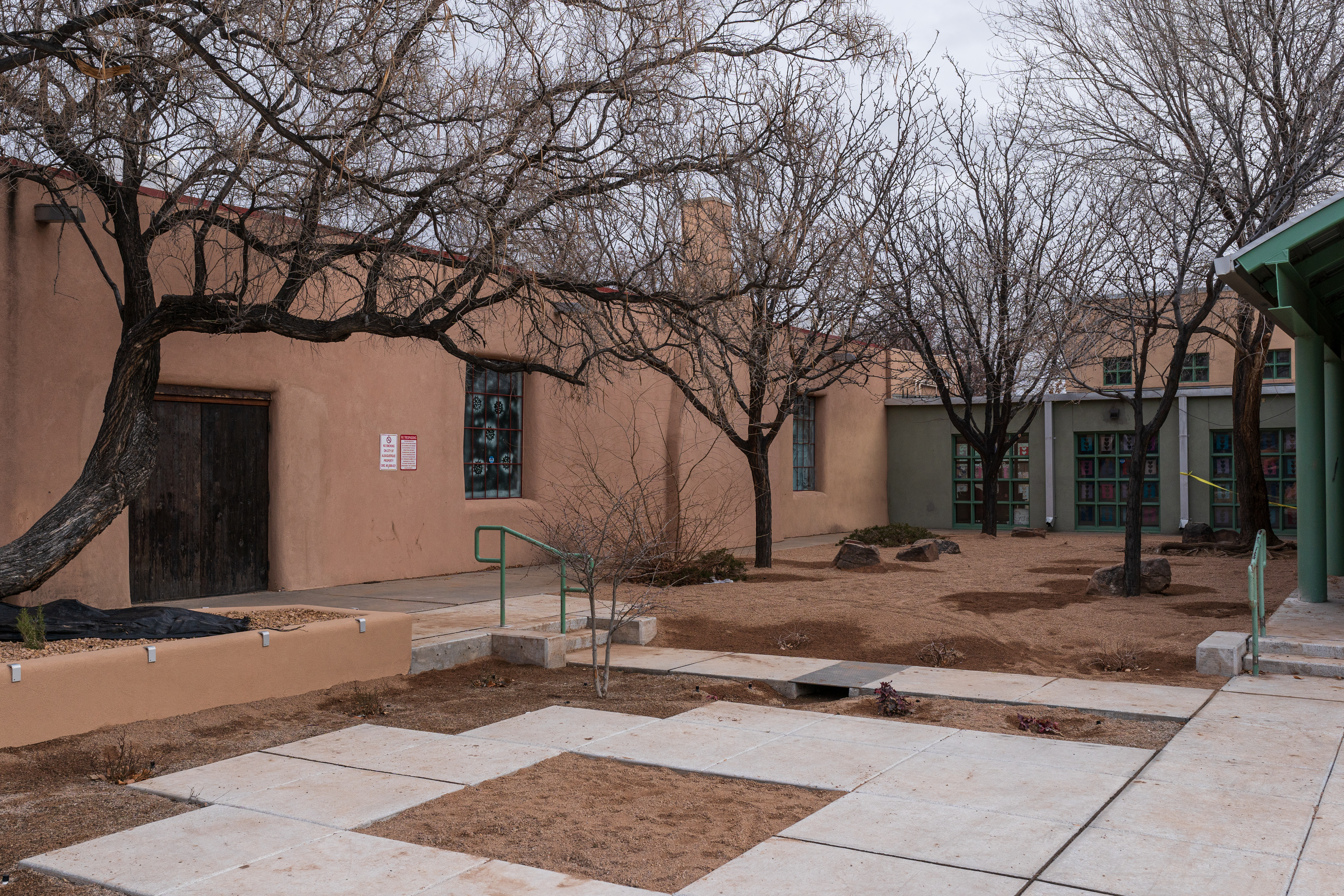
The original adobe building connects via hallway to the 2004 addition.

The center offered various services including youth organizations and activities, adult education, and recreation. It was operated by LULAC from 1942 to 1944 and the Barelas Community Council from 1944 to 1955 before being absorbed by the city's Parks and Recreation Department in 1955. Eleanor Roosevelt visited in 1956, writing in the Albuquerque Tribune that "The influence of these centers is making a great difference in the development of young people." The building was added to the New Mexico State Register of Cultural Properties and the National Register of Historic Places in 2021.

The community center is a one-story, U-shaped building, modeled after a traditional Spanish-style hacienda with a single row of rooms arranged around a central courtyard. It was designed by local architect A. W. Boehning in the Pueblo Revival style, with buttressed adobe walls, projecting vigas, and wooden lintels. The NYA constructed the building using labor-intensive traditional methods including hand-made adobe bricks and hand-cut vigas. The building contains a game room, a girls' club room, a kitchen, and a large community room with a stage. The community room is decorated with a series of six Native American-themed murals painted in 1957 by Albuquerque Indian School students under the direction of Teofilo Tafoya. A separate gymnasium was built in 1977 and was later connected to the main building in 2004.

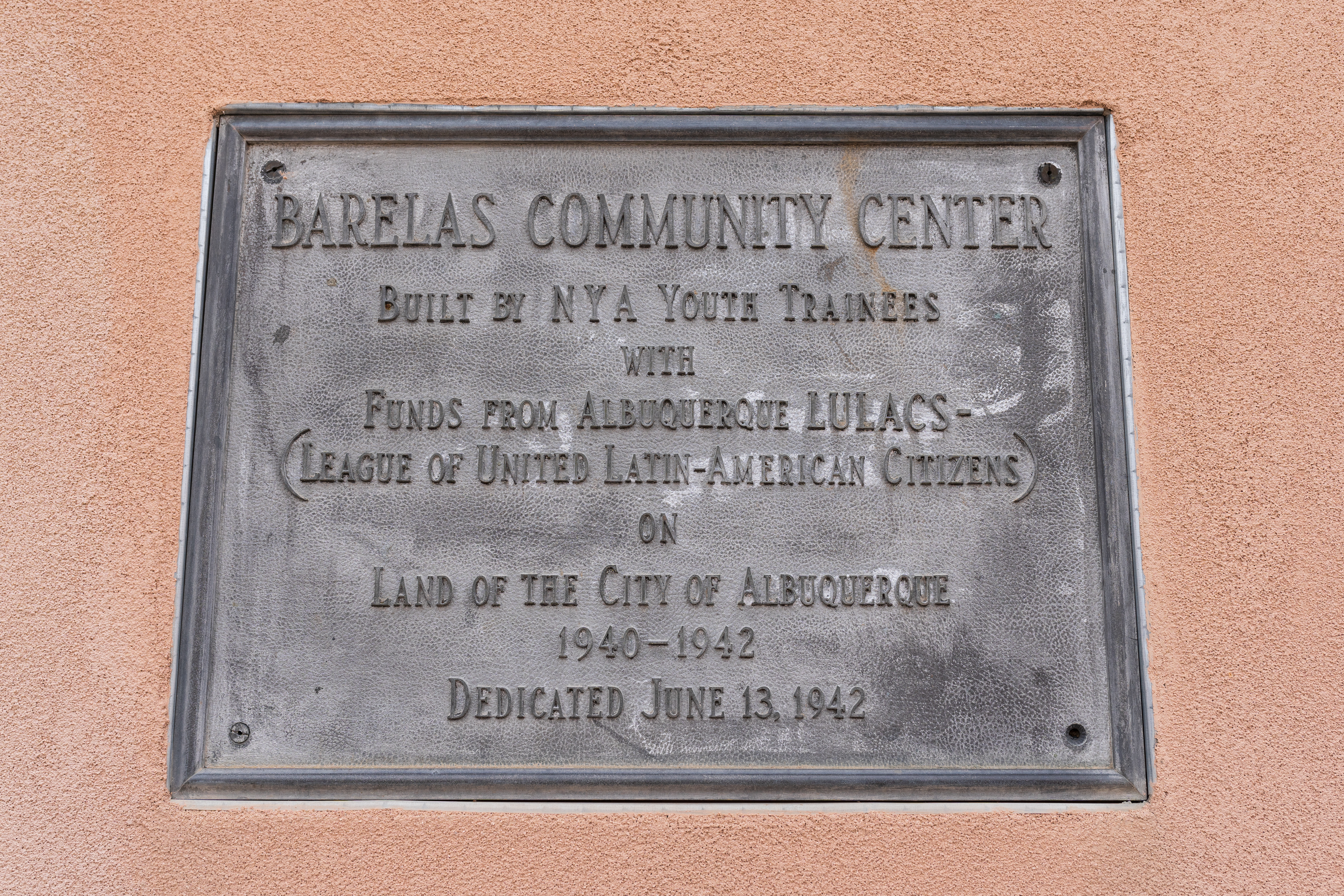
The plaque that adorns an interior courtyard wall.
