= KiMo Theater =

United States historic landmark in New Mexico

- Kimo Theatre
- U.S. National Register of Historic Places
- NM State Register of Cultural Properties
- Albuquerque Historic Landmark
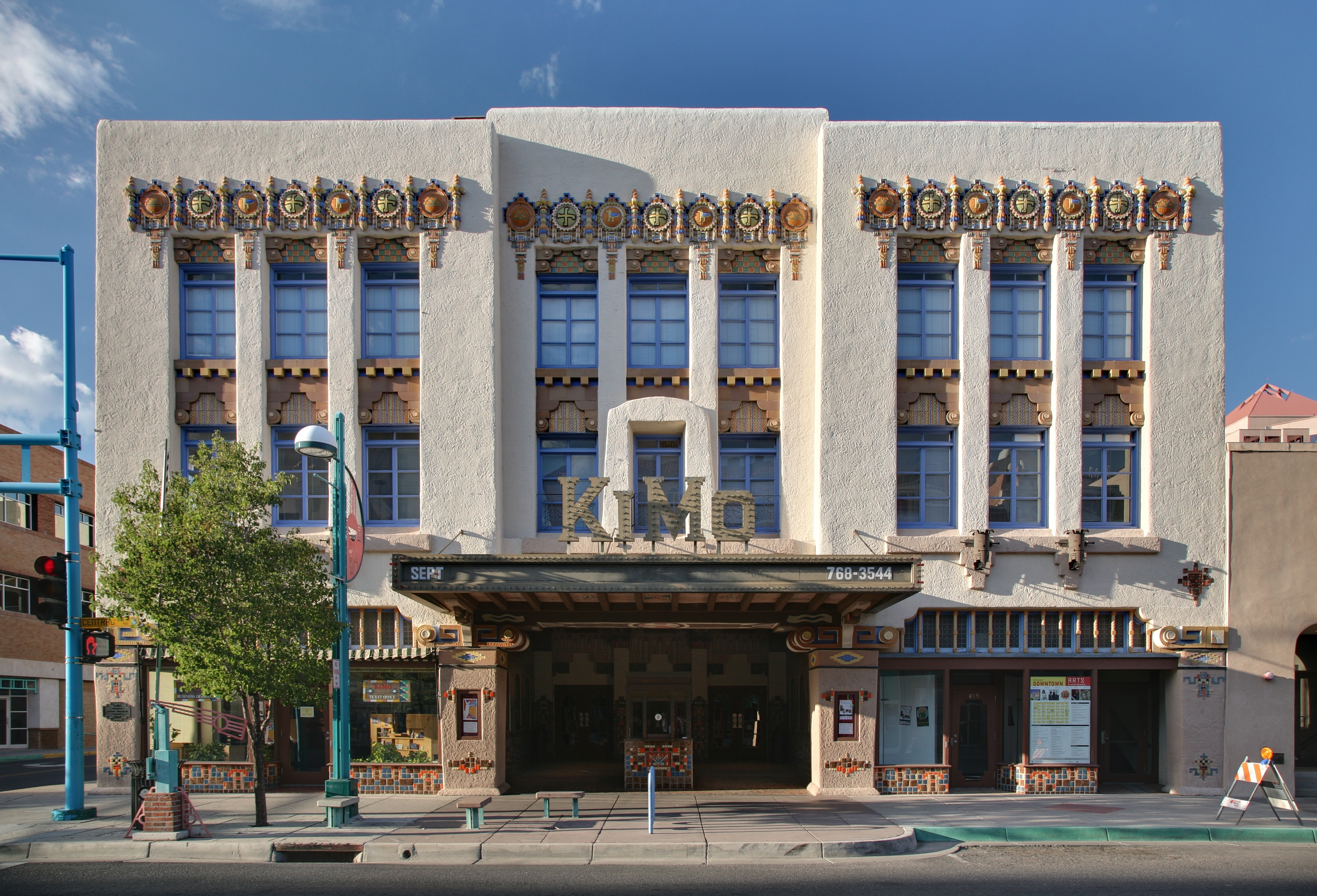
- Location: 423 Central Avenue NW, Albuquerque, New Mexico
- Coordinates: 35°05′06″N 106°39′09″W
- Built: 1927
- Architect: Boller Brothers; Carl Boller
- Architectural style: Pueblo Deco
- NRHP reference No.: 77000920
- NMSRCP No.: 453

Significant dates
- Added to NRHP: May 2, 1977
- Designated NMSRCP: July 30, 1976

The KiMo Theatre is a theatre and historic landmark located in Albuquerque, New Mexico on the northeast corner of Central Avenue and Fifth Street. It was built in 1927 in the extravagant Pueblo Deco architecture, which is a blend of adobe-style Pueblo Revival architecture building styles (rounded corners and edges), decorative motifs from indigenous cultures, and the soaring lines and linear repetition found in American Art Deco architecture.

== History ==
The KiMo was conceived by Italian-American entrepreneur Oreste Bachechi (c. 1860–1928) and his wife, Maria Franceschi Bachechi (c. 1865–1959). It was Mrs. Bachechi's desire to give a tribute to the Native Americans who had embraced the Bachechi family as part of their own. After much travel and meetings with various architects in both NM and California, the design was accepted from Carl Boller of the Boller Brothers architecture firm, who conducted an extensive investigation into the cultures and building styles of the Southwest before submitting his design. The theater is a three-story stucco building with the stepped massing characteristic of native pueblo architecture, as well as the recessed spandrels and strong vertical thrust of Art Deco skyscrapers. Both the exterior and interior of the building incorporate a variety of indigenous motifs, like the row of terra cotta shields above the third-floor windows.

In June 1927, the Albuquerque Journal sponsored a competition to choose a name for the new theater, with a $50 prize for the winner. The rules stipulated that the name "must be in keeping with this truly American Theatre, whose architecture is a combination of Aztec, Navajo and Pueblo. It must be an Indian name. The name must not have more than six letters." Over 500 entries were received from around the state. Pablo Abeita, the former governor of Isleta Pueblo, was chosen as the winner for his suggestion of "Kimo", meaning "mountain lion" (sometimes loosely translated as "king of the beasts"). The second-place entry was "Eloma".

The theater opened on September 19, 1927, with a program including Native American dancers and singers, a performance on the newly installed $18,000 Wurlitzer theater organ, and the comedy film Painting the Town. Dignitaries at the event included Senator Sam G. Bratton, former governor Arthur T. Hannett, and Chairman of the City Commission Clyde Tingley, while Hollywood stars including Mary Pickford and Douglas Fairbanks sent congratulatory telegrams. Cecil B. DeMille wrote, "The erection of such a theater is definite proof of the great progress being made by this industry of ours."

In 1935, the Bachechi family merged their theater interests with those of Joseph Barnett, including the Sunshine Theater, which put most of Albuquerque's theaters under the same ownership. By 1952, the chain, Albuquerque Exhibitors, controlled 10 local theaters and had 170 employees. The company leased its theaters in 1956 to the Texas-based Frontier Theaters chain, which was taken over by Commonwealth Theaters in 1967. Commonwealth closed the theater in 1970, after which it was leased for a few years by Albuquerque Music Theater and then started showing adult films.

By 1977, the theater had fallen into disrepair due to a fire. The City of Albuquerque offered to purchase the building at a fraction of its value or condemn it and then demolish it. The family decided that it was best to preserve the theater for future generations and sold the theater to the City of Albuquerque. It has undergone several phases of continuing restoration to return it to its former glory and is once again open to the public for performances. The most recent preservation was completed in 2000 with the installation of new seating and carpet, main stage curtain, new tech booth, lighting positions hid between and behind "vigas" on the ceiling, and a re-creation of the KiMo's original proscenium arch. The auditorium seating capacity was 650 at completion of the restoration.

In 2011, the city commissioned a replica of the theater's original neon sign, which was installed around 1929 and removed sometime in the 1950s. The completed sign, which is 24 feet (7.3 m) tall by 5 feet (1.5 m) wide and cost $16,000, was installed in June 2011.

== Alleged haunting ==
According to local legend, the KiMo Theatre is haunted by the ghost of Bobby Darnall, a six-year-old boy killed in 1951 when a water heater in the theater's lobby exploded. The tale alleges that a theatrical performance of A Christmas Carol in 1974 was disrupted by the ghost, who was supposedly angry that the staff was ordered to remove donuts they had hung on backstage pipes to appease him.

While investigating the legend, writer Benjamin Radford determined that the performance of A Christmas Carol in question actually occurred in 1986, not 1974, and two people he spoke with who were involved in the production did not remember anything unusual. According to Radford, "All the evidence points to one inescapable conclusion: The ruined play—the very genesis of the KiMo ghost story—simply did not occur; it is but folklore and fiction". Radford also contacted Bobby Darnall's siblings, who told him they felt "exploited by the story" and did not appreciate "claims that their beloved brother is eating doughnuts or ruining performances at the KiMo Theater".

== Architectural features and legacy ==
Architectural significance: The KiMo Theatre is an extraordinary example of Pueblo Deco, a style that integrates Pueblo Revival elements with Art Deco influences. This style is rare and reflects a unique fusion of indigenous Southwestern and early 20th-century modern architectural trends.

Interior design: Inside, the theater features intricate motifs inspired by Southwestern indigenous cultures, including ziggurat patterns, native symbolism, and murals that depict traditional Native American themes. The blend of cultural elements serves as a tribute to the region's heritage.

Art historian Ruth Anne Phillips, in a 2007 study of pre-Columbian architectural appropriation in the United States, distinguished the KiMo from theaters that made more extensive use of pre-Columbian forms. Phillips noted that the KiMo is primarily a Native American-themed building, and that "the only indigenous American elements" drawn from pre-Columbian Mesoamerican sources are "abstracted Maya-like glyphs on the entrance foyer walls." Phillips placed the KiMo within a broader lineage of pre-Columbian-themed U.S. theaters that included the Aztec Theatre in San Antonio (1926), the Mayan Theatre in Los Angeles, the Mayan Theater in Denver (1930), and the Fisher Theatre in Detroit (1928).

== Gallery ==
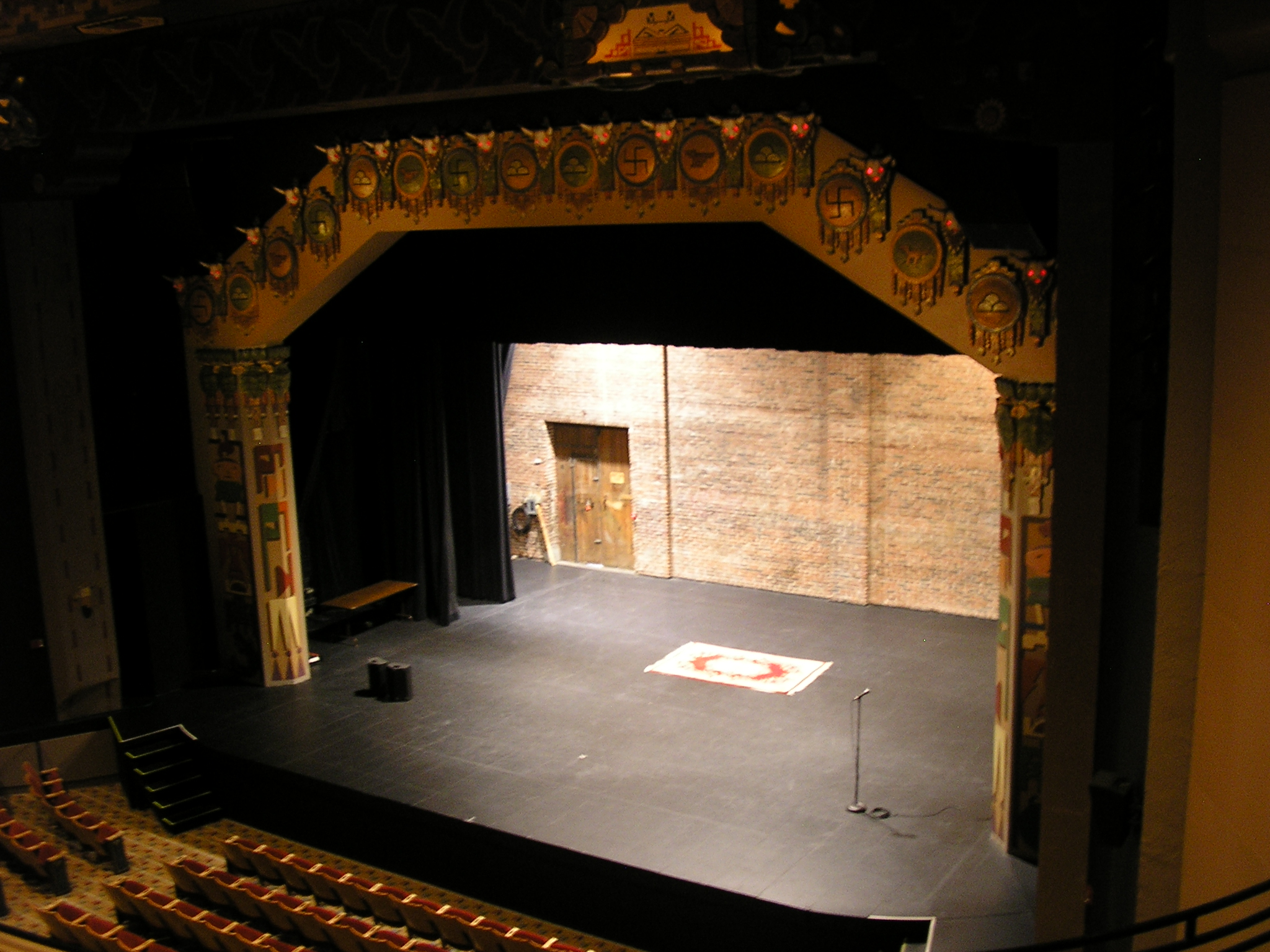
Interior of the KiMo theater.

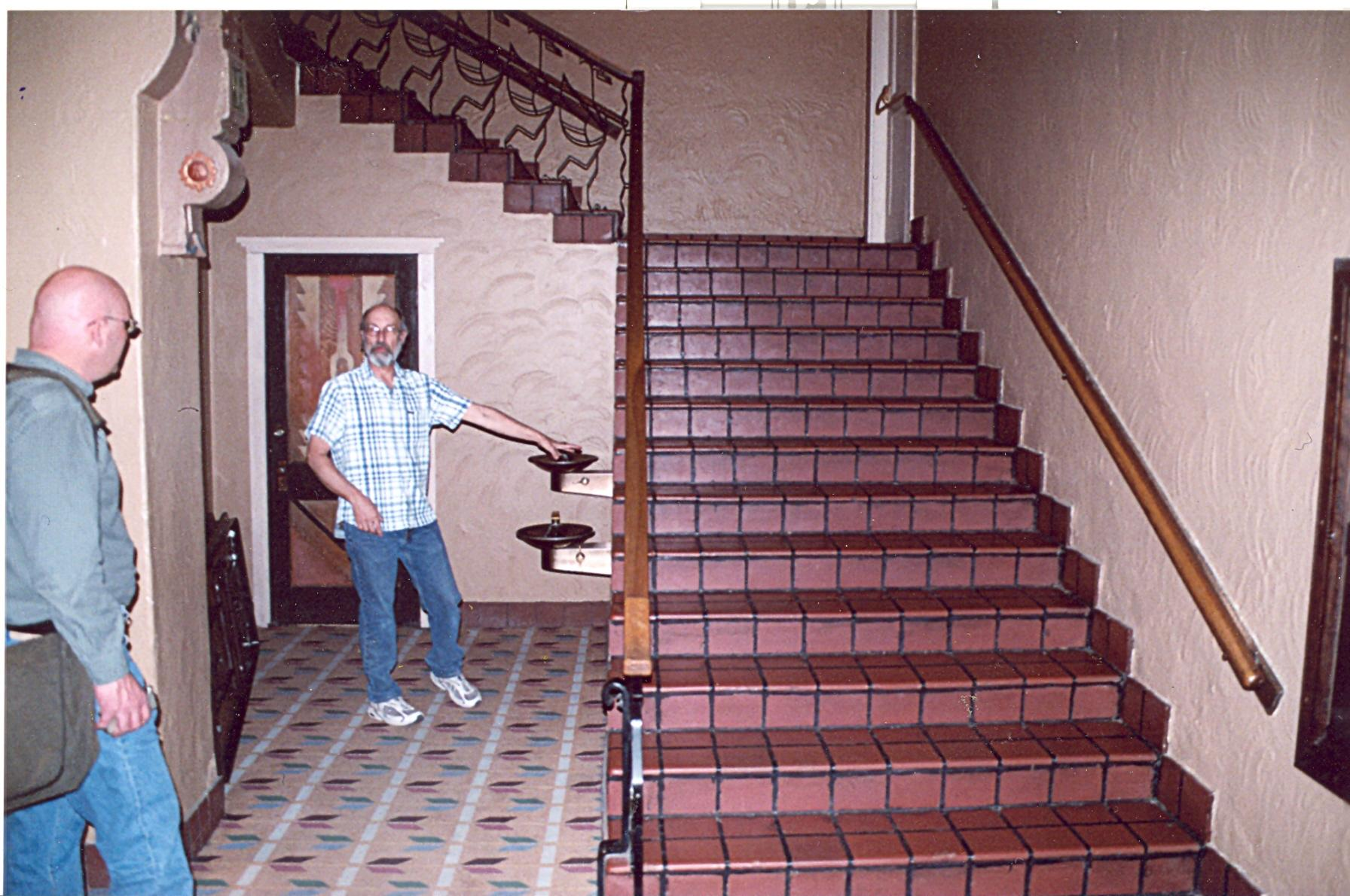
KiMo technician Dennis Potter shows investigator Benjamin Radford the site of a 1951 explosion which spurred a ghost story.

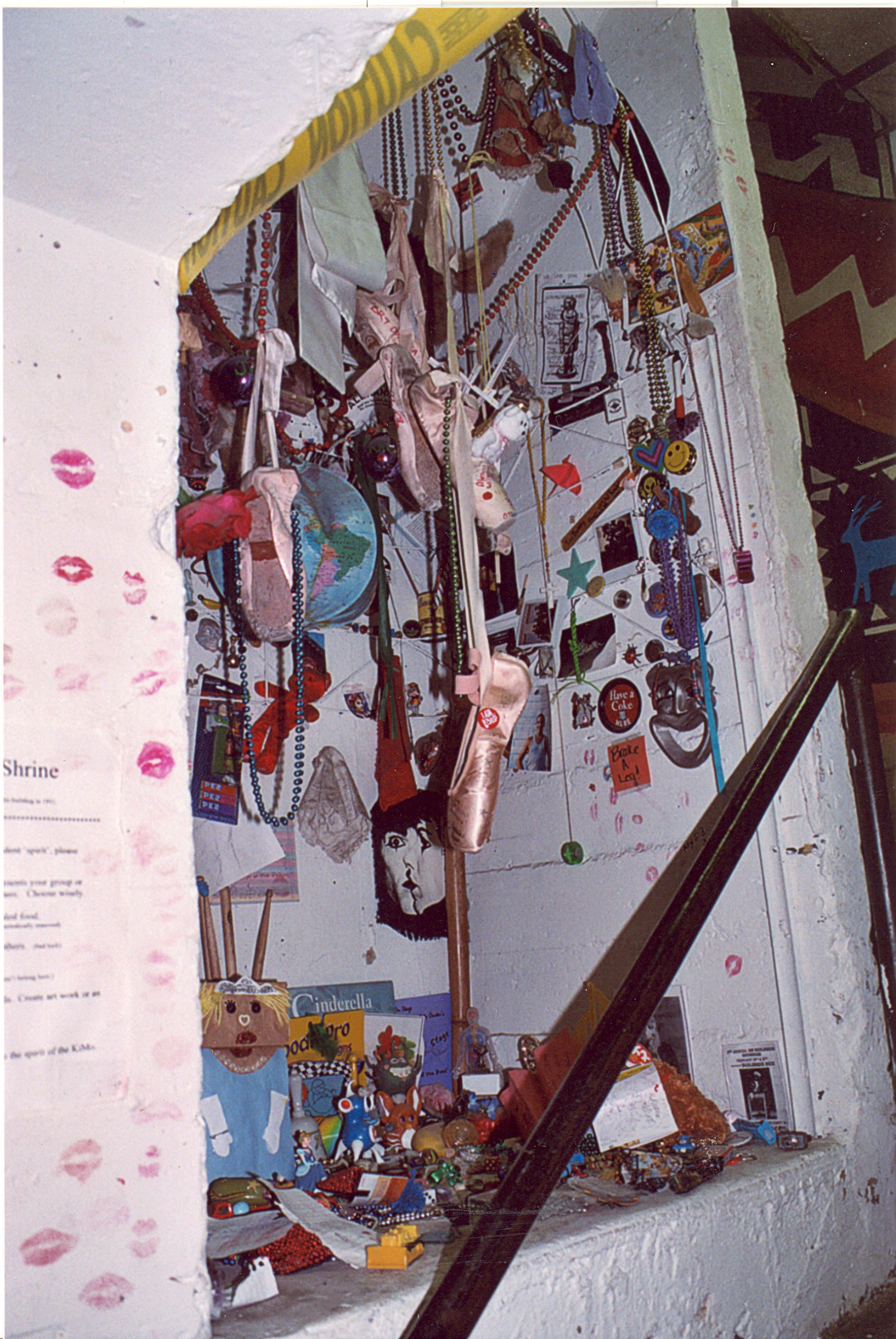
Shrine at the KiMo theater where, by tradition, cast and crew leave offerings for the resident boy ghost.

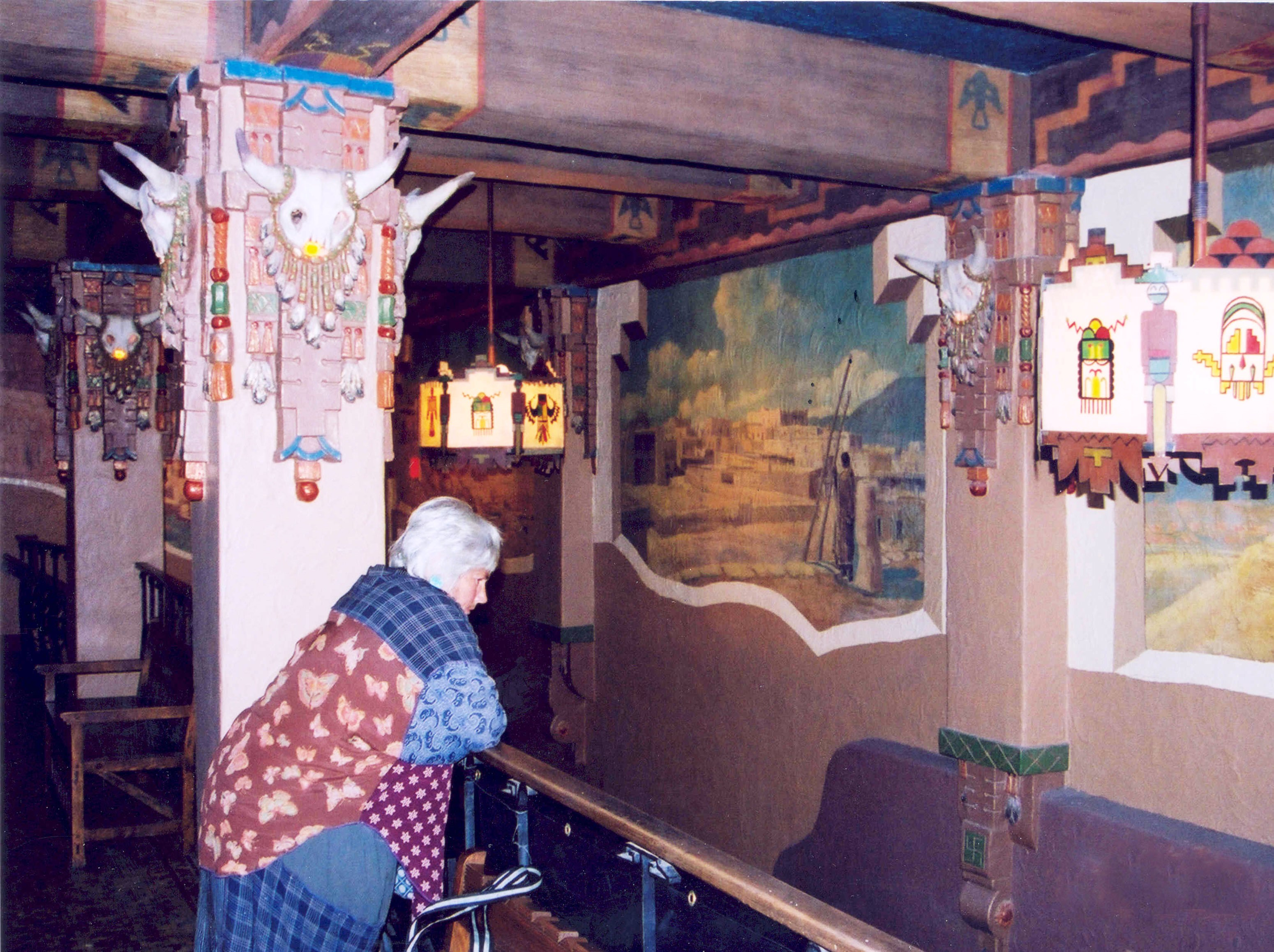
Interior of the theatre

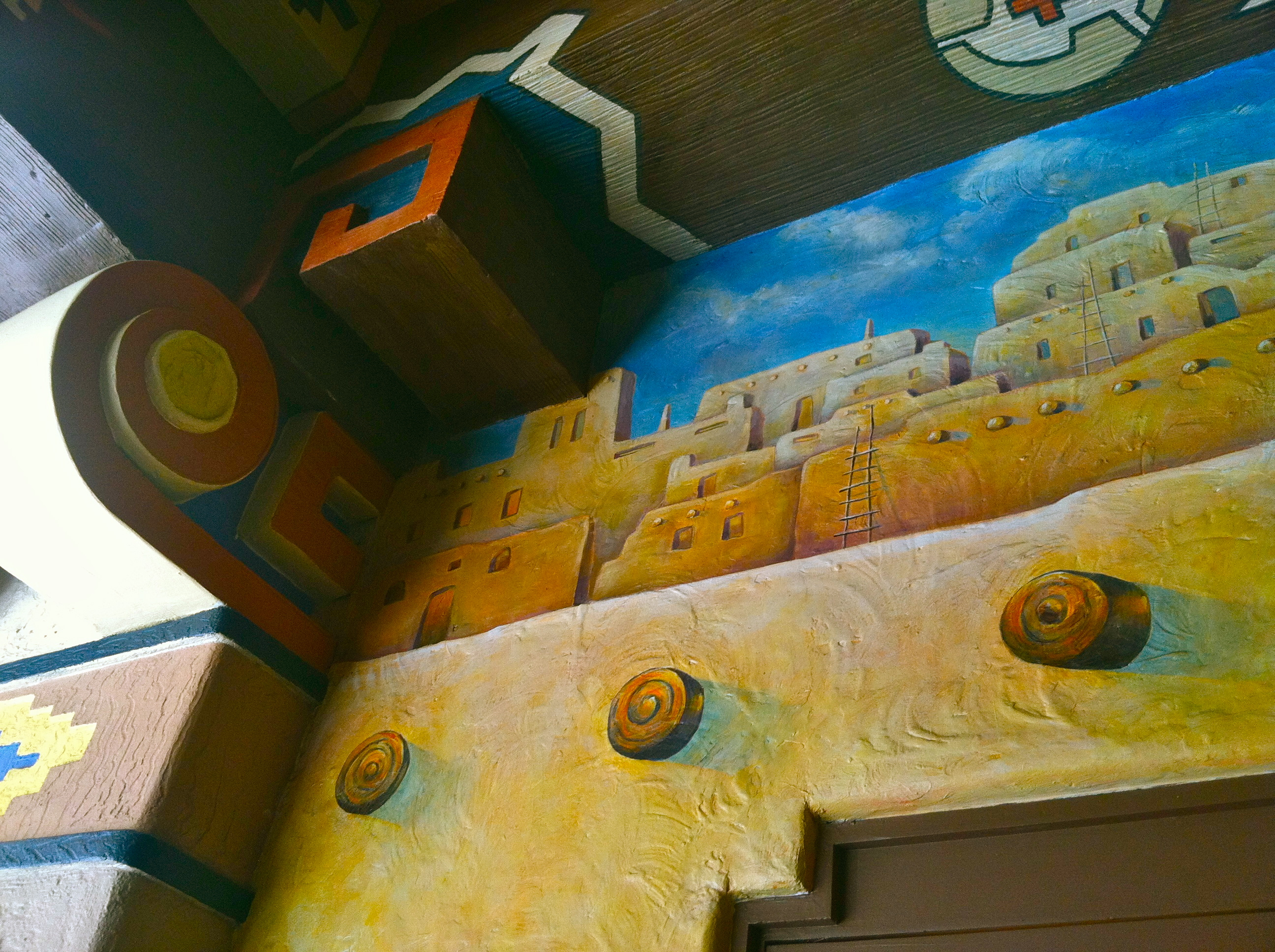
Theater detail
