= Occidental Life Building =

- U.S. National Register of Historic Places
- NM State Register of Cultural Properties
- Albuquerque Historic Landmark
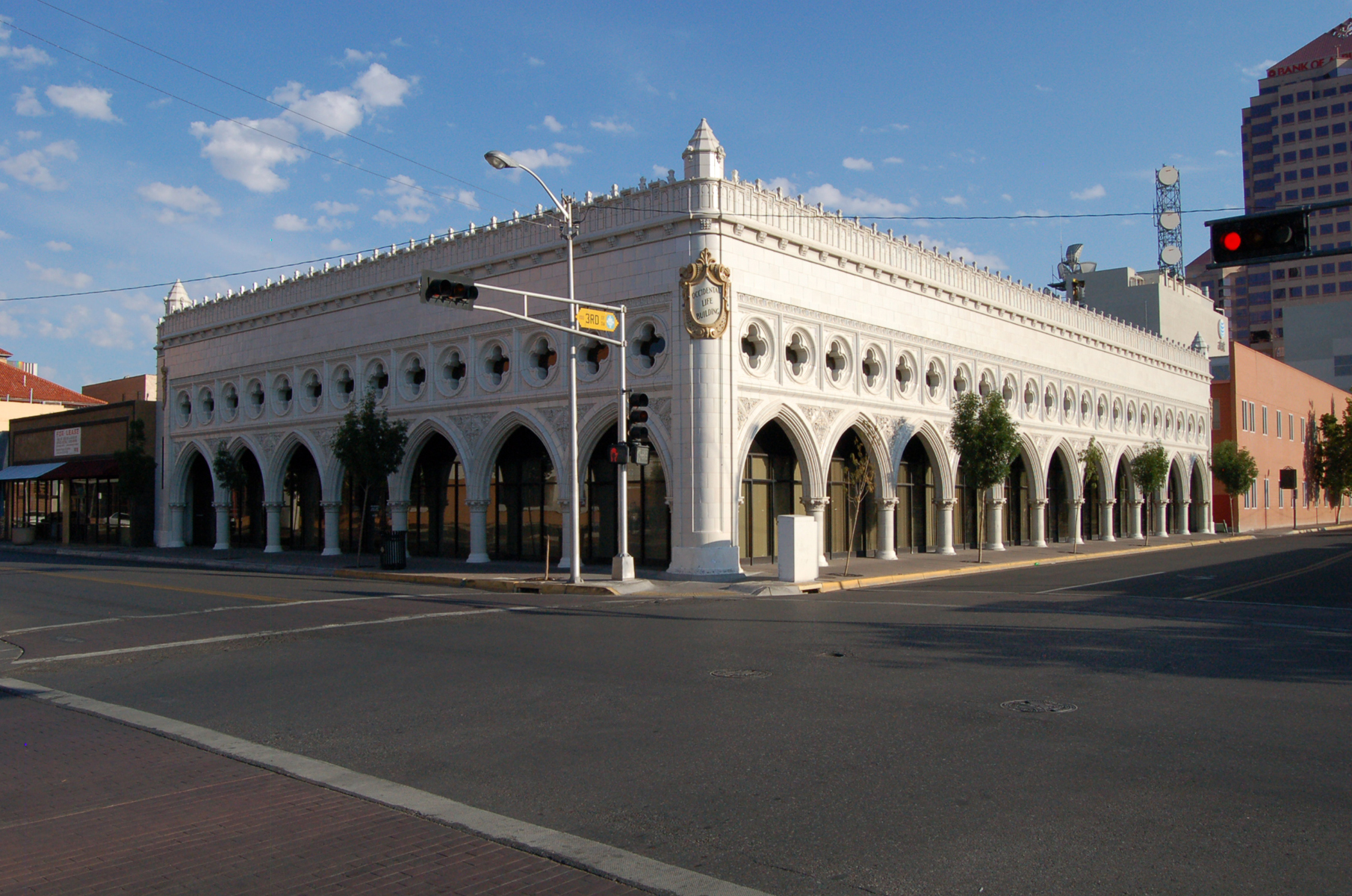
- Location: 119 3rd Street SW, Albuquerque, New Mexico
- Coordinates: 35°5′0.55″N 106°39′1.08″W
- Built: 1917
- Architect: Henry Charles Trost; W. Miles Brittelle
- Architectural style: Late Gothic Revival
- NRHP reference No.: 78001805
- NMSRCP No.: 277

Significant dates
- Added to NRHP: January 30, 1978
- Designated NMSRCP: March 1, 1973

The Occidental Life Building is a historic office building in Albuquerque, New Mexico, in the United States. Featuring an unusual Venetian Gothic Revival architectural style inspired by the Doge's Palace in Venice, the building is one of the city's most recognizable landmarks and has been described as "unique in the country".

The building was designed by Henry C. Trost and opened in 1917. A fire in 1933 left the Occidental Life Building mostly gutted; however the exterior walls remained standing and the remainder of the structure was rebuilt. The architect for the reconstruction, W. Miles Brittelle, took the opportunity to redesign the roofline for a more consistent Venetian appearance. The building interior was remodeled again in 1981 to add a second story.

The Occidental Life Building is located on the northwest corner of Third Street and Gold Avenue in Downtown Albuquerque. It was added to the New Mexico State Register of Cultural Properties in 1973 and the National Register of Historic Places in 1978.

== History ==
The Occidental Life Building was built in 1917 as the new headquarters of the Occidental Life Insurance Company, which had been organized in 1906 by a group of prominent local businessmen. The building was designed by Henry C. Trost, the chief architect of the El Paso firm of Trost & Trost. Trost was a prolific designer whose other built works in Albuquerque include the Rosenwald Building, First National Bank Building, and Sunshine Building. The building's unusual Venetian Gothic design was reportedly suggested by Occidental Life vice president George Roslington, a native of England.

The building opened to the public with an evening ceremony on August 1, 1917, which was attended by an estimated 1,000 people. In recognition of the American entry into World War I that year, the program included performances of Rule, Britannia!, The Maple Leaf Forever, and La Marseillaise. The building's early tenants included a number of other insurance agencies in addition to Occidental Life, as well as savings and loan companies, realtors, and an engineering firm.

A fire broke out in the Occidental Life Building early on the morning of April 25, 1933, causing an estimated $100,000 in damage before firefighters managed to extinguish it around noon that day. The building was mostly gutted, though the exterior walls remained intact up to the roofline. The Albuquerque Journal reported that the fire was thought to have started "between the ceiling and the roof in the northeast corner of the building". The fire occurred just hours after the burning of another Albuquerque landmark, the Fourth Ward School (replaced the following year by Lew Wallace Elementary), leading police and local residents to suspect arson.

Following the fire, the building was rebuilt to the design of W. Miles Brittelle of the Albuquerque firm of Brittelle and Ginner, reopening in the spring of 1934. In keeping with the building's Venetian influence, Brittelle decided to redesign the roofline to more closely resemble the Doge's Palace, with an ornamental frieze and finials in place of the original overhanging cornice. The interior office space was also expanded by eliminating the original open arcade behind the facade, and the building structure was upgraded from frame to steel construction. In 1981 the interior was remodeled again to add a second story within the original facade.

== Architecture ==
The Occidental Life Building features a Venetian Gothic Revival architectural style which is highly unusual for New Mexico, and has been described by the Albuquerque Landmarks and Urban Conservation Commission as "unique in the country." The Baum Building in Oklahoma City, built in 1909, employed similar architectural features but was demolished in the early 1970s.

The building's most significant feature is the white terra cotta facade, which wraps around the south and east sides of the building. The facade was modeled after that of the Doge's Palace in Venice, with arcades of pointed Venetian Gothic arches, quatrefoil windows, and, following the 1934 rebuilding, an ornamental frieze with a row of finials. The spandrels and capitals are decorated with elaborate floral ornamentation, and the building's rounded corners are punctuated with pointed turrets. The tile used in both the original and rebuilt portions of the exterior was manufactured by the Denver Terra-Cotta Tile Company.
