= List of historic landmarks in Albuquerque, New Mexico =

This is a list of historic landmarks in Albuquerque, New Mexico, as designated by the City Council. To date 24 individual properties (two of which are no longer standing) have been so designated. Historic landmarks may not be demolished or significantly altered without approval from the Landmarks and Urban Conservation Commission.

There are entire neighborhoods that fall under historic landmark classifications, for a more comprehensive list of their historic landmarks see their respective pages: Barelas, Old Town Albuquerque, Nob Hill, and Los Ranchos de Albuquerque. Also take note of historic parts of the broader Albuquerque metropolitan area, including Belen, Bosque Farms, Corrales, Cuba, Isleta Village Proper, Los Lunas, Peralta, and Rio Rancho.

== Historic landmarks ==
Properties are also listed on the National Register of Historic Places (NR) or New Mexico State Register of Cultural Properties (SR) as noted.

Name	Image	Location	Notes
AT&SF Locomotive 2926		1600 12th St. NW; 35°6′11″N 106°39′15″W	SR 1975; NR 2007
AT&SF Memorial Hospital		806 Central Ave. SE; 35°4′57″N 106°38′17″W	Contributing property in Huning Highlands Historic District
AT&SF Railway Fire Station		1st and 2nd SW; 35°4′36″N 106°39′01″W	SR 2014; NR 2014
Albuquerque International Sunport - North Façade and Great Hall		2200 Sunport Blvd. SE; 35°2′57″N 106°37′0″W	
Bataan Memorial Park	Upload image	3401 Lomas Blvd. NE; 35°5′18″N 106°36′21″W	SR 1999
De Anza Motor Lodge		4301 Central Ave. NE; 35°4′46″N 106°35′45″W	SR 2003; NR 2004
El Vado Auto Court		2500 Central Ave. SW; 35°5′39″N 106°40′36″W	SR 1993; NR 1993
Heights Community Center		823 Buena Vista Dr. SE; 35°4′24″N 106°37′28″W	NR 2021
Highland/Hudson Hotel		202 Central Ave. SE; 35°5′1″N 106°38′44″W	Contributing property in Huning Highlands Historic District
Jones Motor Company		3222 Central Ave. SE; 35°4′38″N 106°37′9″W	SR 1993; NR 1993
KiMo Theater		423 Central Ave. NW; 35°5′6″N 106°39′7″W	SR 1976; NR 1977
Las Mañanitas	Upload image	1800 Rio Grande Blvd. NW; 35°6′38″N 106°40′21″W	
Main Library		501 Copper Ave. NW; 35°5′9″N 106°39′12″W	SR 2018; NR 2019
Occidental Life Building		119 3rd St. SW; 35°5′1″N 106°39′1″W	SR 1973; NR 1978
Old Airport Terminal		2920 Yale Blvd. SE; 35°2′52″N 106°37′14″W	SR 1976; NR 1989
Old Albuquerque High School		Central and Broadway NE; 35°5′3″N 106°38′38″W	SR 1977; Contributing property in Huning Highlands Historic District
Old Hilton Hotel		125 2nd St. NW; 35°5′6″N 106°38′56″W	SR 1983; NR 1984
Old Main Library		423 Central Ave. NE; 35°5′2″N 106°38′33″W	SR 1975; Contributing property in Huning Highlands Historic District
Ernie Pyle House		900 Girard Blvd. SE; 35°4′13″N 106°36′45″W	SR 1997; NR 1997
Roosevelt Park		Coal and Spruce SE; 35°4′35″N 106°37′49″W	SR 1996; NR 1996
Rosenwald Building		320 Central Ave. SW; 35°5′3″N 106°39′3″W	SR 1978; NR 1978
Skinner Building		722 Central Ave. SW; 35°5′6″N 106°39′20″W	SR 1980; NR 1980
Sunshine Building		120 Central Ave. SW; 35°5′2″N 106°38′57″W	SR 1985
Whittlesey House		201 Highland Park Cir. SE; 35°4′54″N 106°38′21″W	SR 1975; Contributing property in Huning Highlands Historic District

== Former landmarks ==
Name	Image	Location	Notes
Anson Flats	Upload image	816-894 5th St. NW; 35°5′35″N 106°39′4″W	Burned in 1996
AT&SF Railway Passenger Depot		314 1st St. SW; 35°4′56″N 106°38′52″W	Burned in 1993
Werner–Gilchrist House		314 1st St. SW; 35°4′44″N 106°37′9″W	Demolished in 2011

== See also ==
- New Mexico State Register of Cultural Properties
- National Register of Historic Places listings in New Mexico
