= Heights Community Center =

- U.S. National Register of Historic Places
- NM State Register of Cultural Properties
- Albuquerque Historic Landmark
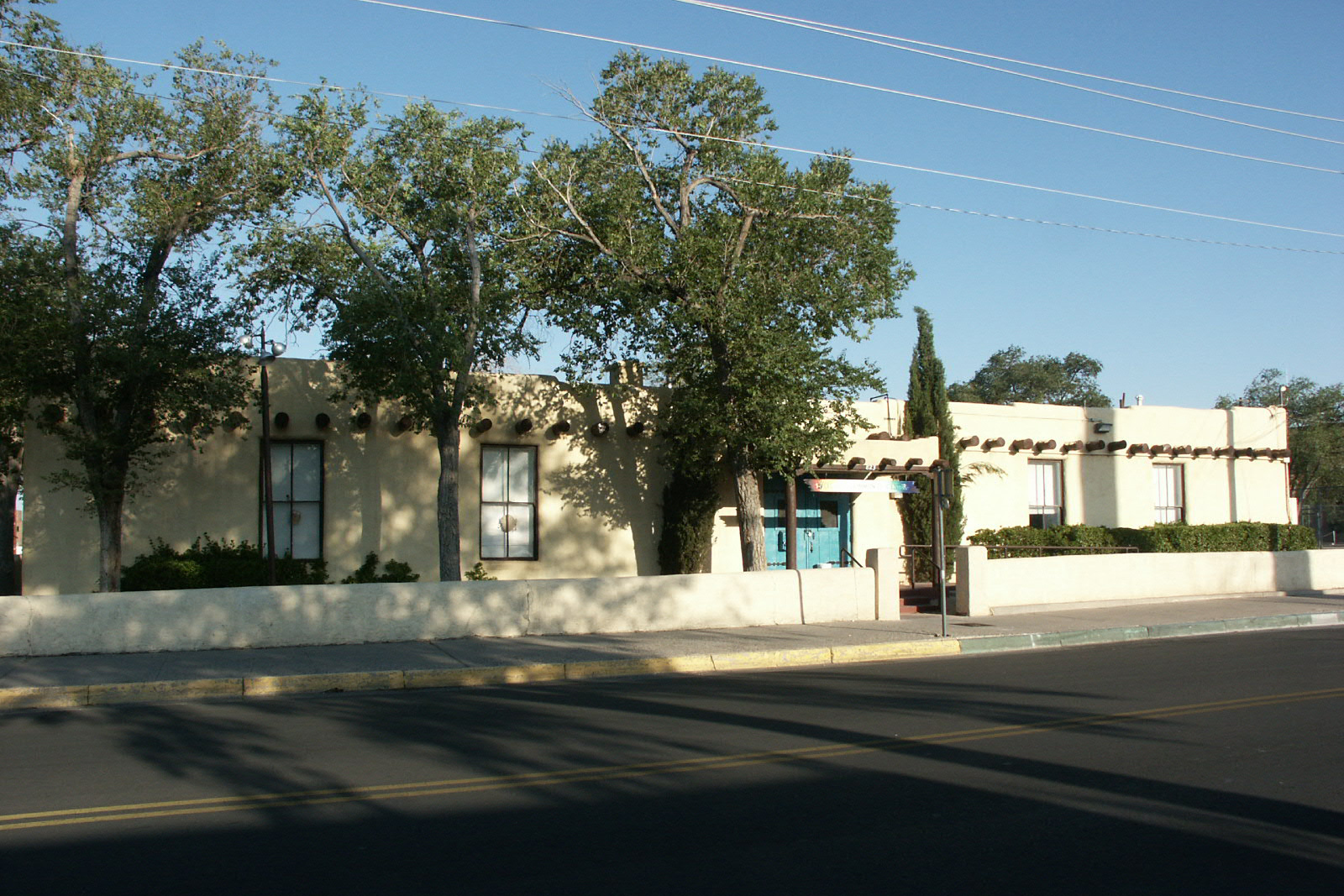
- Heights Community Center in 2003
- Location: 823 Buena Vista Ave. SE, Albuquerque, New Mexico
- Coordinates: 35°4′24″N 106°37′28″W
- Built: 1940
- NRHP reference No.: 100007238
- NMSRCP No.: 2067

Significant dates
- Added to NRHP: December 9, 2021
- Designated NMSRCP: October 8, 2021

The Heights Community Center is a historic community center in Albuquerque, New Mexico. It was built from 1938 to 1940 by the National Youth Administration (NYA), a New Deal agency which provided jobs and vocational training for young Americans. The building was constructed on a minimal budget using donated and scavenged materials, including discarded nails collected from the Albuquerque Municipal Airport construction site. Subsequently, the NYA also built the Barelas Community Center in 1942. These were the first two community centers in the city, and both are still in use as of 2021. The Heights Community Center has hosted the same types of functions since it opened, including dances, classes and activities for children, and space for community groups. The building was added to the New Mexico State Register of Cultural Properties and the National Register of Historic Places in 2021. It is also an Albuquerque Historic Landmark.

The community center is a one-story Pueblo-Revival-style building constructed using labor-intensive traditional methods including hand-formed adobe bricks and hand-cut vigas. It is modeled after a traditional Spanish-style hacienda, with a single row of rooms arranged around a central courtyard. An internal portal (veranda) surrounds the courtyard on all four sides. The building contains classrooms, offices, a meeting room, a kitchen, and a large dance or assembly hall. An addition was built in 1949 which doubled the size of the dance hall. Further additions were built at the rear in 1980 and 2006.
