= Roosevelt Park (Albuquerque, New Mexico) =

- U.S. National Register of Historic Places
- NM State Register of Cultural Properties
- Albuquerque Historic Landmark
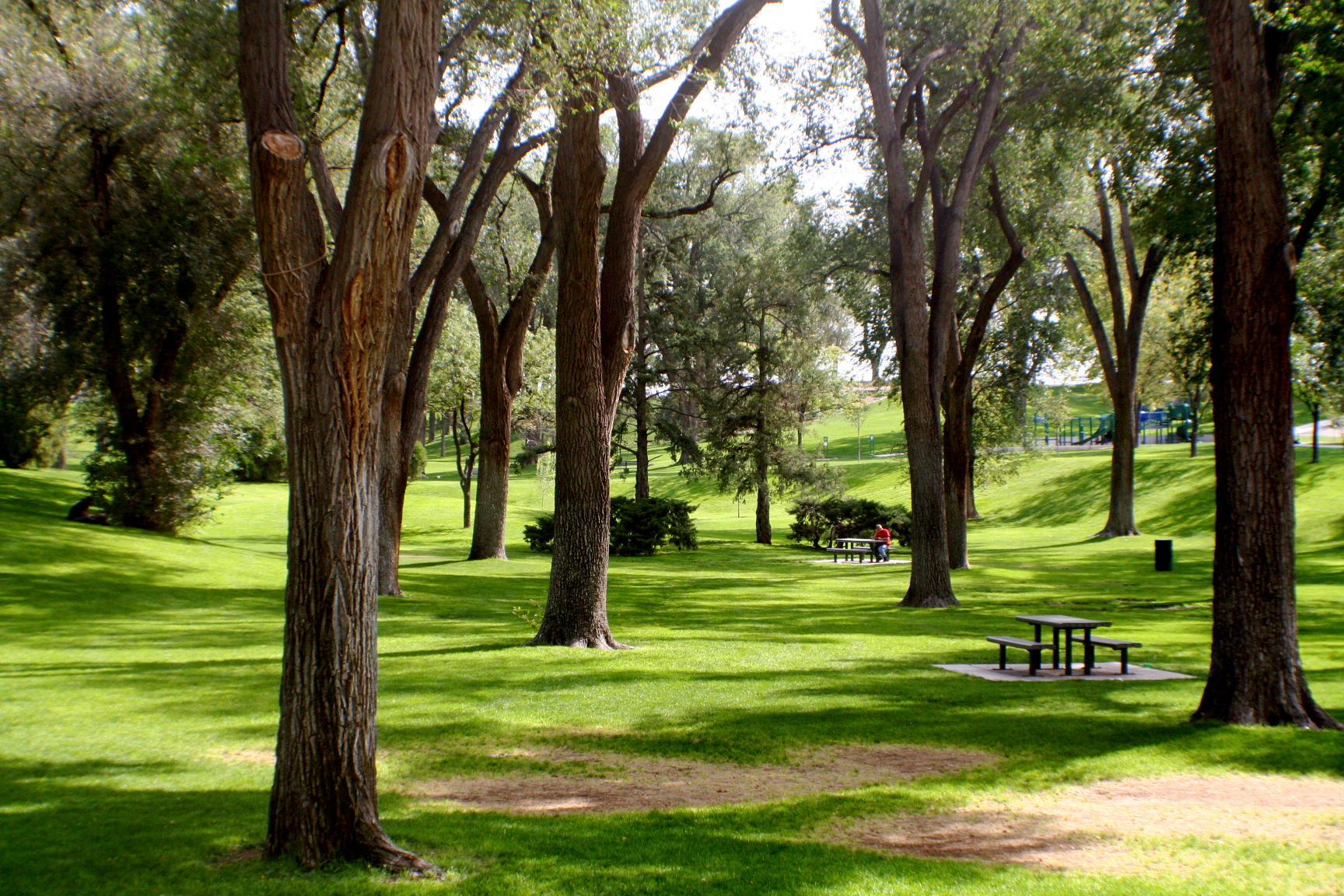
- Roosevelt Park in 2009

- Location within New Mexico Location within the United States
- Location: 500 Spruce St. SE; Albuquerque, New Mexico
- Coordinates: 35°4′35″N 106°37′49″W
- Area: 14 acres (5.7 ha)
- Built: 1935
- Architect: C.E. "Bud" Hollied
- NRHP reference No.: 96001384
- NMSRCP No.: 1646

Significant dates
- Added to NRHP: November 22, 1996
- Designated NMSRCP: September 27, 1996

Roosevelt Park is a historic park in Albuquerque, New Mexico. It is listed on the New Mexico State Register of Cultural Properties and the National Register of Historic Places, and is a protected Albuquerque Historic Landmark. The park was built between 1933 and 1935 by manual laborers employed by President Franklin D. Roosevelt's New Deal programs, turning a sandy arroyo filled with garbage into a rolling, grassy landscape planted with over 2,000 trees and bushes. It has long been one of the city's most popular gathering and recreation areas, although it also developed a reputation as a dangerous area beginning in the 1960s. The park received a major renovation in 2006–7.

== Landscape ==
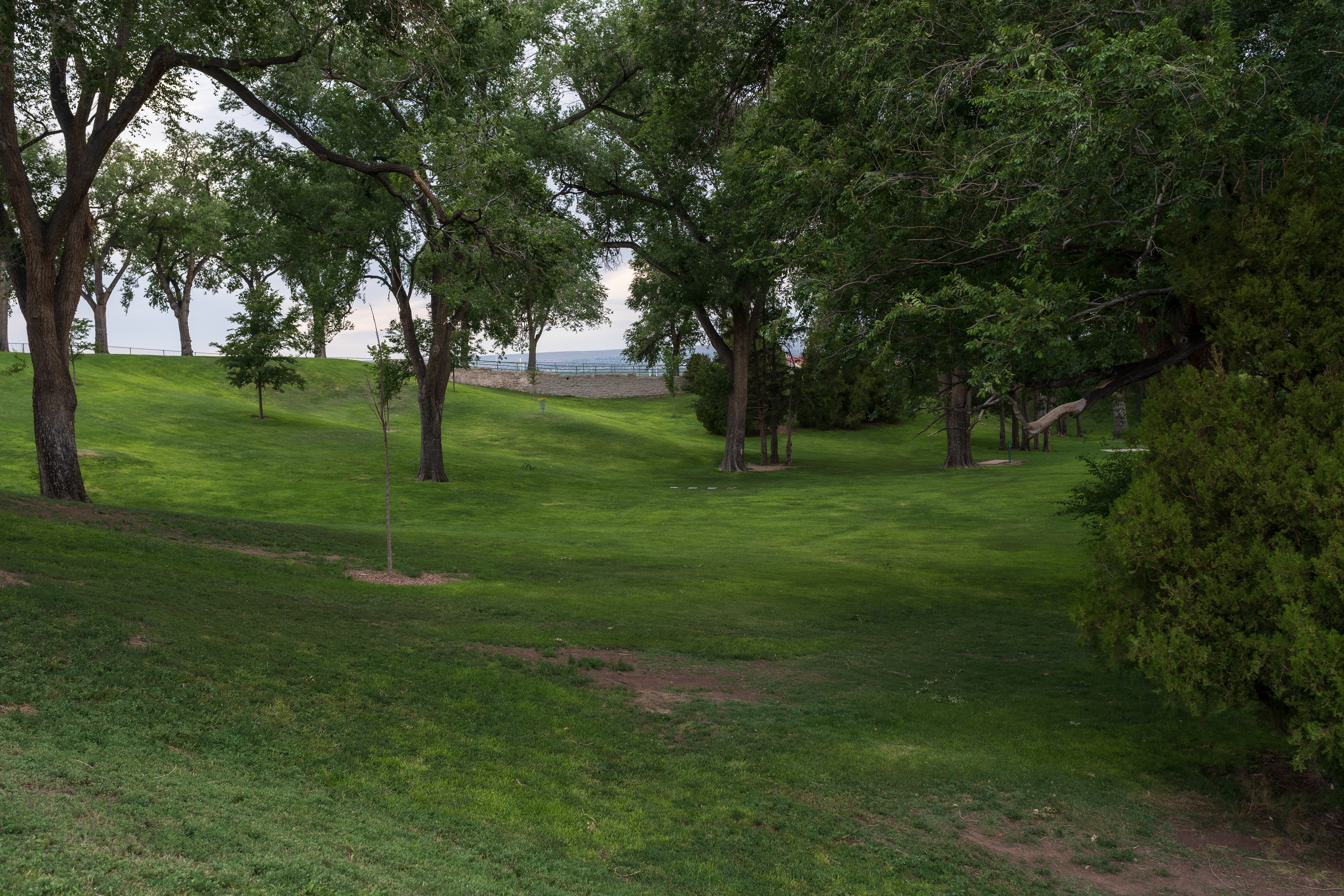
Looking southwest across the southerly portion of Roosevelt Park. This section of the park hosts the disc golf course.

Roosevelt Park occupies an irregularly shaped, 14-acre (5.7 ha) plot south of Coal Avenue between Spruce and Maple Streets. The northern part of the park is bounded by city streets, while the southern part is surrounded by a paved drive which is no longer open to traffic. The park terrain consists of a series of irregular hollows, mostly sitting below the level of the surrounding streets, with a vertical relief of about 50 feet (15 m) between the lowest and highest points. The main canopy is formed by mature Siberian elm trees up to 80 feet (24 m) in height, with other vegetation including juniper, blue spruce, and catalpa trees and bushes scattered throughout.

Amenities at the park include a playground and disc golf course.

== History ==
In the 1930s, Albuquerque was experiencing rapid growth east of Downtown in the area then known as the East Mesa. The idea of building a park in the growing eastern suburbs was supported by Clyde Tingley, who was the Chairman of the City Commission at the time and was an advocate of parks and other civic improvements. Tingley pieced together land for the project from one block of the Terrace Addition, which he persuaded the developer to donate, and an adjacent parcel belonging to Albuquerque Public Schools. The chosen site was a sandy arroyo which had previously been used as a landfill.

The park was built between 1933 and 1935 by local laborers working for the Civil Works Administration (CWA), Federal Emergency Relief Administration (FERA), and Works Progress Administration (WPA)—federal employment programs created as part of Franklin D. Roosevelt's New Deal. The total cost of the project was about $120,000. The men worked in crews of up to 300, using shovels and wheelbarrows to reshape the arroyo. The landscape architect for the project was C. Edmund "Bud" Hollied, a former superintendent of greenhouses at Cornell who had moved to Albuquerque for tuberculosis treatment. Hollied laid out an undulating, pastoral landscape planted with Siberian elms and other plants well suited to the arid climate. Originally known as Terrace Park, it was renamed for Roosevelt in 1934.

Although one of Albuquerque's most popular gathering places, Roosevelt Park developed a reputation as a dangerous area during the 1960s and 70s, with numerous violent incidents as well as ongoing issues with drug use and underage drinking. Nearby residents petitioned for improved lighting and a curfew in 1965, citing nighttime disturbances "ranging from shouts to screaming and calls for help". The ongoing trouble at Roosevelt Park and other city parks led the Albuquerque Police Department to establish an undercover "park patrol" unit in the late 1960s. Relations between the police and park-goers were tense, leading to incidents of rock-throwing and finally a full-blown riot in 1971 after police tried to arrest some teenagers for drinking beer in the park. The riot spread across the city, ultimately causing over $3 million in damage and 41 injuries.

Another much-publicized violent incident occurred in 1992, when three people were injured by gunfire during a barbecue being held by the well-known rapper MC Hammer and his entourage. By 2003 the park was still considered unsafe by neighborhood residents, and its physical condition had deteriorated significantly as well. This led the city to embark on a $2 million renovation project which included pruning trees, replacing the irrigation system, installing a playground and jogging path, and landscaping work. The project was completed in summer 2007 after 10 months of work. The park has continued to be associated with protests and activism, including hosting a large demonstration against police brutality in 2014.
