= De Anza Motor Lodge =

- U.S. National Register of Historic Places
- NM State Register of Cultural Properties
- Albuquerque Historic Landmark
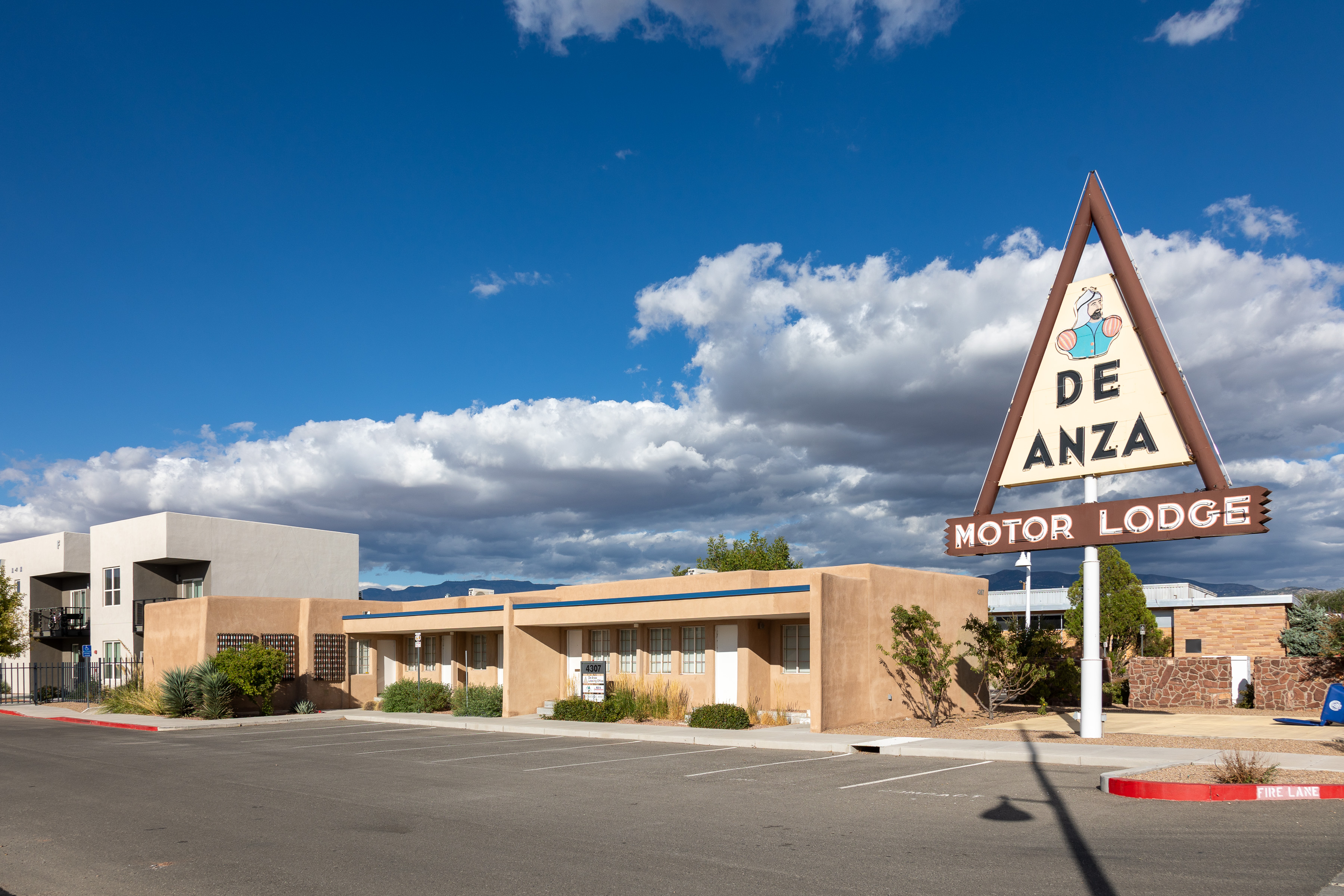
- De Anza Motor Lodge in 2024
- Location: 4301 Central Ave. NE, Albuquerque, New Mexico
- Coordinates: 35°4′46″N 106°35′45″W
- Built: 1939
- NRHP reference No.: 04000375
- NMSRCP No.: 1837

Significant dates
- Added to NRHP: April 30, 2004
- Designated NMSRCP: August 8, 2003

The De Anza Motor Lodge was a historic motel located on former U.S. Route 66 in the Upper Nob Hill neighborhood of Albuquerque, New Mexico. It was built in 1939 by Charles G. Wallace, a local trader of Zuni art and pottery, who remained the owner until 1983. Wallace decorated the motel with a variety of Native American art, including a series of murals by Zuni artist Tony Edaakie in a basement room.

The motel was purchased by the city of Albuquerque in 2003 and remained vacant while various renovation proposals fell through. Ultimately, the city approved a plan to redevelop the site with mostly new construction, and all but two smaller buildings were demolished in 2017–18. The De Anza was replaced by a new apartment complex preserving some historic elements including the two surviving buildings, the neon sign, and the Zuni murals.

== History ==
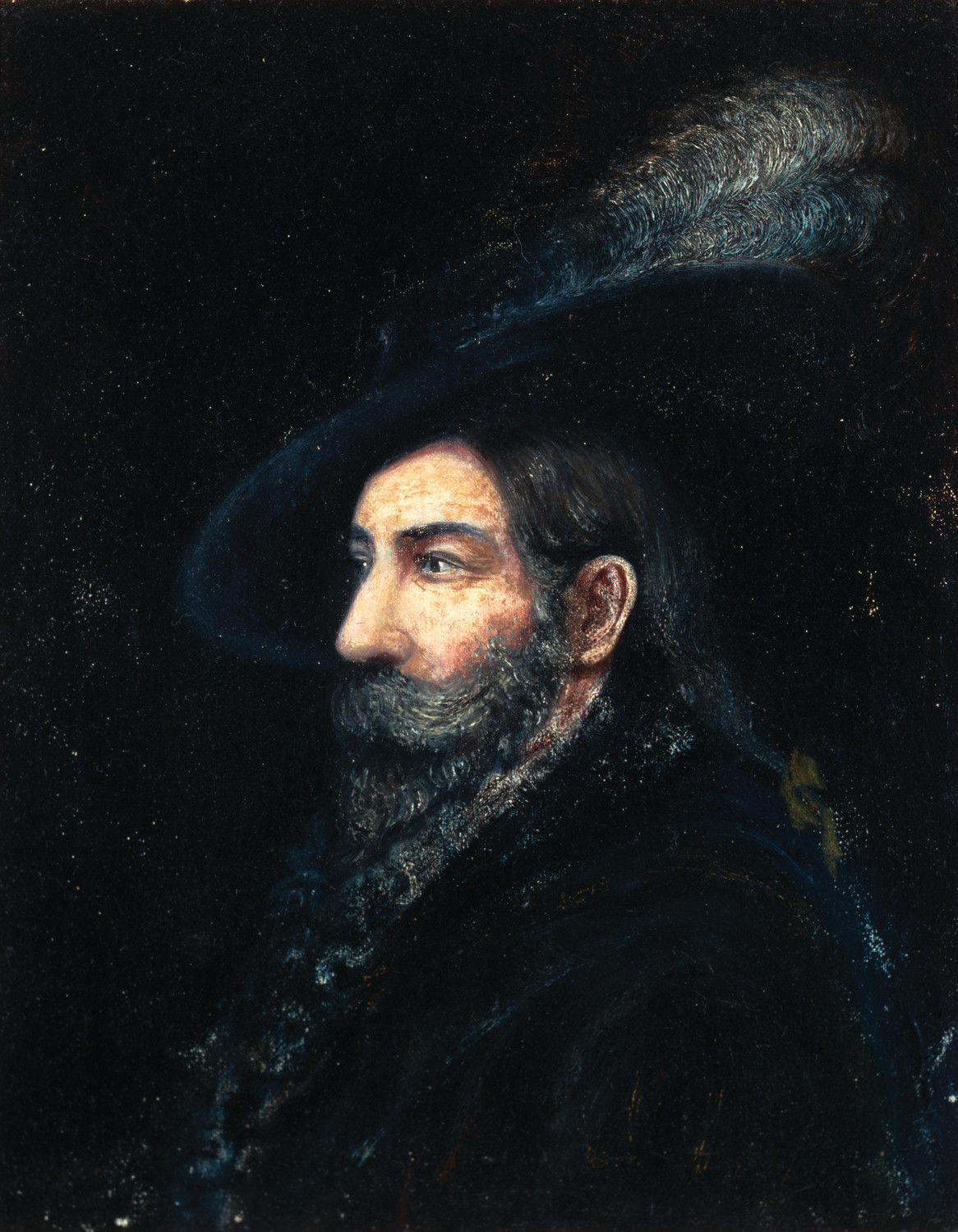
Juan Bautista de Anza, namesake of the motor lodge.

Charles Garrett Wallace came to New Mexico in 1919 to work for the Ilfeld Company, where he became a prominent trader with the people of Zuni Pueblo. In the 1930s, with trade suffering due to the Depression, Wallace saw the influx of tourists on Route 66 as an opportunity to expand his business. He partnered with Tucson entrepreneur S.D. Hambaugh to build a motel on East Central, which they named the De Anza Motor Lodge after Juan Bautista de Anza, a Spanish governor of New Mexico. The motel opened in 1939 with 30 rooms. Soon thereafter, Wallace bought out Hambaugh to become the sole owner.

Wallace expanded and remodeled the De Anza after World War II, removing most of the Pueblo Revival elements to give the motel a more modern appearance. The number of rooms increased to 55 and then 67. A cafe called the Turquoise Room, featuring a terrazzo floor inlaid with turquoise and silver pieces, and a basement conference room were also added. To decorate the conference room, Wallace commissioned Zuni artist Tony Edaakie to create two large murals depicting the Shalako festival. Completed in 1951, the murals are considered to be a unique example of such artwork.

Wallace sold the De Anza in 1983 and died ten years later. The motel changed hands several times and eventually went out of business. In 2002, a proposal by Albertsons to raze the De Anza caught the attention of the city, which began looking at ways to save the property and ultimately bought it for $891,000 in July 2003. However, two different renovation projects fell apart over the next ten years as the motel continued to deteriorate. In 2017, the city approved a redevelopment project which would turn the property into a hotel and apartment complex of substantially new construction, preserving only a few pieces of the historic motel. The project proceeded in 2017–18 with most of the De Anza being razed. Two smaller buildings were preserved, along with the motel sign and the Zuni murals.

The building was added to the New Mexico State Register of Cultural Properties in 2003 and the National Register of Historic Places in 2004. In 2012, it was designated a Historic Landmark by the city of Albuquerque.

== Architecture ==
The De Anza site occupies a full city block at the northwest corner of Central Avenue and Washington Street. Prior to the 2017–18 demolitions, the motel consisted of six one-story lodging buildings arranged in a U shape around a courtyard with a pair of two-story buildings set one in front of the other at the center. The front-most building, containing the office and manager's residence, had a projecting porte-cochère and adjacent swimming pool. The rear building contained additional lodging units. The Turquoise Room coffee shop was situated at the southwest corner of the complex. The office, front part of the central lodging building, and the two peripheral buildings on either side dated to the 1930s and were of frame construction, while the other buildings were concrete block and were added in the 1950s. The older buildings were remodeled at the same time, removing many of the original Pueblo Revival details to give a regional vernacular appearance.

== See also ==
- List of motels
