= Werner–Gilchrist House =

Historic house in New Mexico, United States

- U.S. National Register of Historic Places
- NM State Register of Cultural Properties
- Albuquerque Historic Landmark
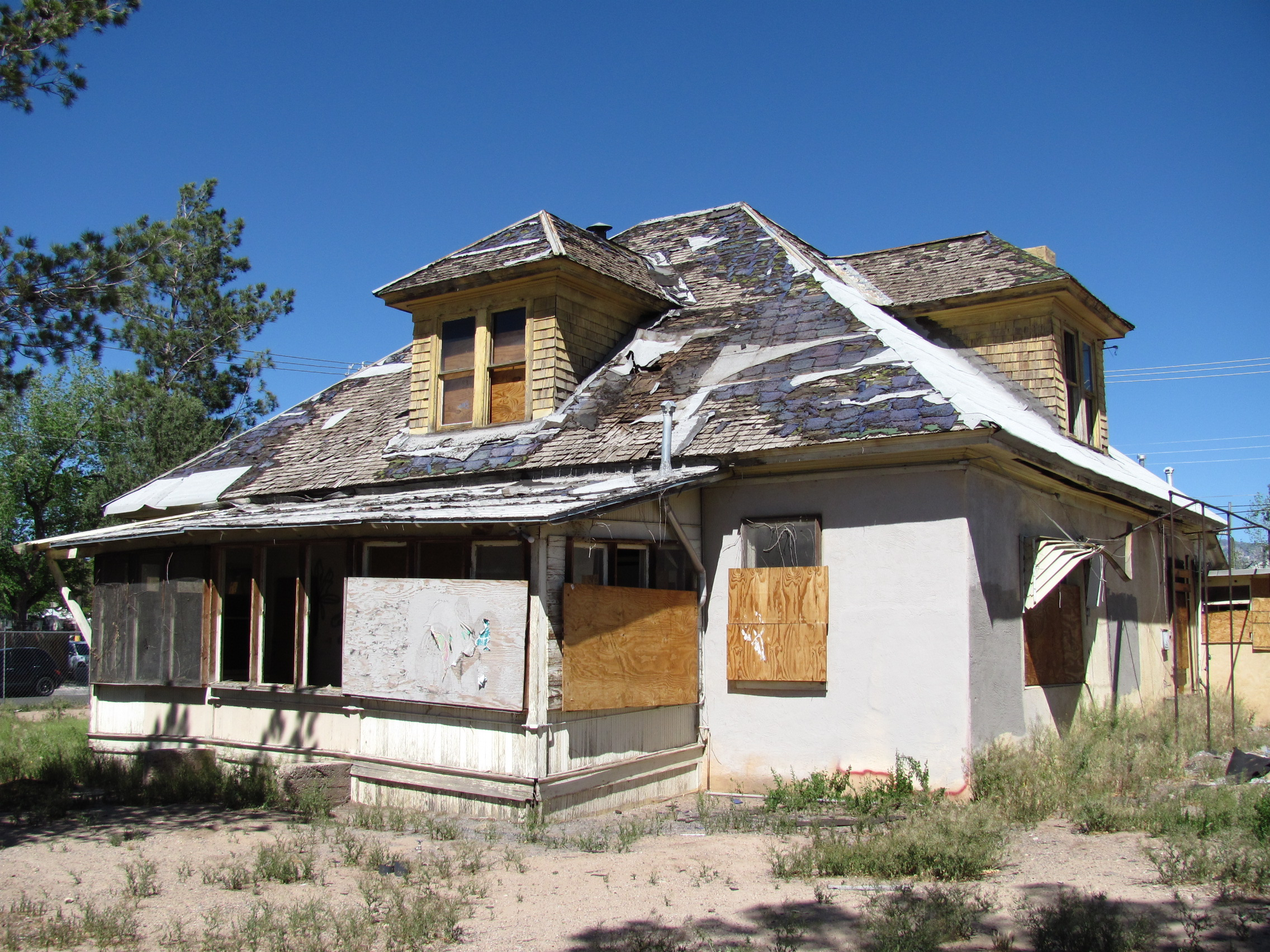
- Werner–Gilchrist House, May 2010
- Location: 202 Cornell Dr. SE, Albuquerque, New Mexico
- Coordinates: 35°04′44.2″N 106°37′09.3″W
- Built: 1908
- Demolished: 2011
- NRHP reference No.: 82003320
- NMSRCP No.: 880

Significant dates
- Added to NRHP: August 2, 1982
- Designated NMSRCP: June 4, 1982
- Designated ALBHL: April 3, 2006

The Werner–Gilchrist House was a historic house located in the University Heights neighborhood of Albuquerque, New Mexico. Built in 1908 as one of the earliest structures on the East Mesa, it was considered a pioneering building in Albuquerque's 20th-century suburban growth. It was added to the New Mexico State Register of Cultural Properties and the National Register of Historic Places in 1982. After standing empty for decades and reaching an advanced state of disrepair, the house was finally demolished in November 2011.

== History ==
The house was built in 1908 by Laura Werner—an employee of real estate developer and future mayor D.K.B. Sellers—and her son-in-law Ralph Gilchrist. Located on a corner lot in Sellers' newly platted University Heights Addition, the house was originally surrounded by empty scrubland with no other buildings nearby except for the University of New Mexico campus to the northwest. Gilchrist and Werner died in 1920 and 1930, respectively, but Gilchrist's widow (and Werner's daughter) Nora Gilchrist continued to live in the house until her own death in 1981.

After remaining vacant for decades, the decrepit house came to the attention of the city in 2005 when its owners applied for a demolition permit. Recognizing the historical importance of the building, the city denied the permit and designated the house a City of Albuquerque Landmark, which would protect it from being demolished without permission. However, the continuing deterioration of the home made it cost-prohibitive to renovate and it remained in limbo until safety concerns brought the issue to a head in 2011. The city ended up issuing a demolition permit, and the house was razed beginning on November 19, 2011. Three UNM architecture graduate students, Bron Heintz, Hilary Noll and Bailey Porter, intervened in the conventional demo-to-landfill process of building demolition by carefully disassembling and salvaging as much of the building as possible, and diverted over half of the materials from the waste stream for reuse.

== Architecture ==
The Werner–Gilchrist House was an example of the "hipped box" style, with a wood-framed hip roof and dormer windows on all four sides. The house had 16-inch thick adobe bearing walls resting on a stacked stone foundation, with wooden door and window frames and trim. A wide entrance hall ran the length of the first floor, while the second floor consisted of a single large room.

== In popular culture ==
Like many locations in Albuquerque, the Werner–Gilchrist House made an appearance in the AMC drama Breaking Bad. In the season two episode "ABQ", it portrayed a crackhouse nicknamed the "Shooting Gallery" due to the heroin addicts that "shoot up" heroin within. Before its demolition, the owner of the house offered to let it be blown up on the show, but the producers declined.
