= Skinner Building (Albuquerque, New Mexico) =

- U.S. National Register of Historic Places
- NM State Register of Cultural Properties
- Albuquerque Historic Landmark
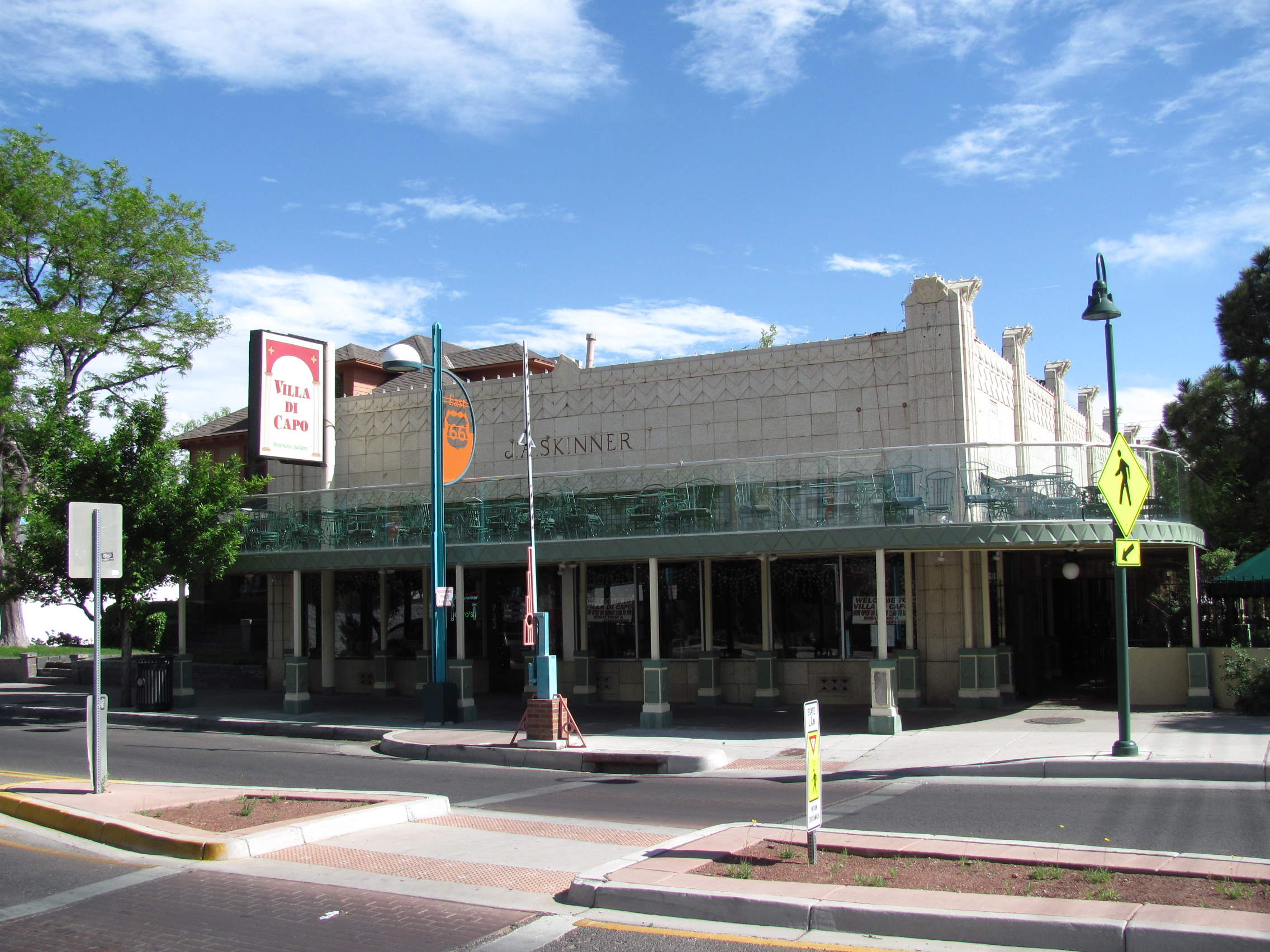
- Skinner Building, May 2010
- Location: 722 Central Avenue SW, Albuquerque, New Mexico
- Coordinates: 35°5′6″N 106°39′22.5″W
- Built: 1931
- Architect: A.W. Boehning
- Architectural style: Art Deco
- NRHP reference No.: 80004485
- NMSRCP No.: 784

Significant dates
- Added to NRHP: November 22, 1980
- Designated NMSRCP: September 16, 1980

The Skinner Building is a historic building in Albuquerque, New Mexico, considered to be one of the best examples of Art Deco architecture in the city. Originally a grocery store owned by J.A. Skinner, it was designed by local architect A.W. Boehning and built in 1931. The building is of brick construction, with a street facade of white terra cotta tile on the north and west sides. Its exterior features a variety of decorative details including fluted towers, grill work, stained glass, and geometric patterns. The Skinner Building was added to the New Mexico State Register of Cultural Properties and the National Register of Historic Places in 1980.

A controversial balcony was added to the building in 2001 after being narrowly approved by the city Landmarks and Urban Conservation Commission, with one commissioner resigning in protest over the decision. As required by the city, the balcony is freestanding and does not actually touch the building.
