= Albuquerque station (Atchison, Topeka and Santa Fe Railway) =

Santa Fe Depot
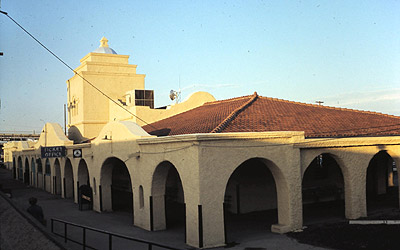
- The depot in 1972

- Location within New Mexico
- 35°4′56″N 106°38′52″W
- Location: 314 1st St. SW, Albuquerque, New Mexico

History
- Built: 1902

Site notes
- Architect: Charles Frederick Whittlesey
- Architectural style: Mission Revival

NM State Register of Cultural Properties
- Designated: January 9, 1981
- Reference no.: 796

Albuquerque Historic Landmark

The Santa Fe Depot was a historic railroad station in Albuquerque, New Mexico, which burned down in 1993. It was originally built by the Atchison, Topeka and Santa Fe Railway in 1902 along with the neighboring Alvarado Hotel. After the hotel was razed in 1970, the depot remained in use by ATSF and then Amtrak passenger trains. The building was listed on the New Mexico State Register of Cultural Properties in 1981 and was designated an Albuquerque Historic Landmark.

== History ==
The Santa Fe Depot was built in 1902, replacing an earlier two-story wooden building. It was part of a larger complex that also included the Alvarado Hotel, an "Indian Building" where tourists could buy southwestern curios, and various outbuildings. The depot and hotel were designed by Charles Frederick Whittlesey and built by Anson & Holman at a total cost of about $80,000.

In 1912, the depot was badly damaged by a fire which destroyed the south end of the building, damaged the tall, three-tiered tower, and gutted the ticket office and baggage rooms. Following the fire, the tower was rebuilt at a lower 50-foot (15 m) height. It was lowered still further during a 1944 remodeling. During the early 20th century, notable people frequently passed through the station, and crowds would gather when word was received that celebrities like Amelia Earhart or Albert Einstein would be arriving.

In 1970, amid declining train traffic, the Santa Fe Railway closed and demolished the Alvarado Hotel. The depot remained in use, and was designated an Albuquerque Historic Landmark, which was intended to protect it from meeting the same fate. However, it was destroyed by a fire on January 4, 1993. In 2006 the depot was replaced by a new Amtrak and Greyhound terminal on the same site which is part of the Alvarado Transportation Center multi-modal transit facility. The replacement station features a similar design to the original, with a tiled roof, arcade, and tower.

== Architecture ==
Like the Alvarado, the depot was designed by Charles Frederick Whittlesey in the Mission Revival style. It was a rectangular, one-story building, 60 by 150 feet (18 by 46 m), and surrounded by a wide arcade that originally connected to the hotel. Other Mission-style details included a hipped tile roof with a curved parapet and a stepped tower. The building was constructed from timber framing with a pebbledash stucco exterior applied to a layer of wire lath.

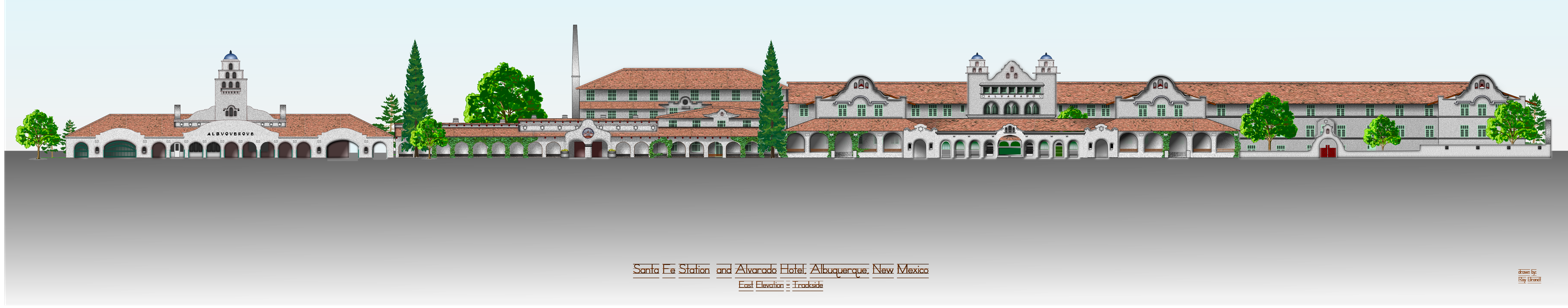
Illustration depicting the east (front) elevation of the Santa Fe Depot (left) and Alvarado Hotel (right)

After the destruction of the Alvarado Hotel, the depot was considered to be Albuquerque's best remaining example of Mission style architecture. In 1978, preservationist Susan Dewitt wrote, "For most of its life, the depot was seen mainly as one part of the beautiful hotel and station complex. Now, standing in isolation, it is all that is left to remind us of the style and elegance that was once an essential part of the Santa Fe."
