= Commonwealth Theaters =

Movie theater chain

- Industry: Entertainment (movie theatres)
- Fate: Acquired by United Artists Communications
- Headquarters: Kansas City, Missouri

Commonwealth Theaters, Inc. was a movie theater chain based in Kansas City, Missouri, USA.

== History ==
In 1936, Commonwealth purchased its headquarters in downtown Kansas City, part of a "film row" that hosted several regional film distribution companies.

In 1983, Commonwealth went private through a merger with CMN Capital Corp. By 1984, Commonwealth was reported to be one of the largest movie theater chains in the country, with over 400 screens in 14 states.

=== Cannon and United Artists ===
Film production company Cannon Group announced in 1986 that it had agreed to purchase Commonwealth for $25 million in cash plus the assumption of $50 to $60 million in debt. At this time, Commonwealth was the sixth-largest theater chain in the country, comprising 425 screens in 12 states, with plans to open 70 more screens that year. Within six months, Cannon ran into serious financial problems. These problems led to Renta Immobiliarla S.A., a Spanish-based group controlled by Italian financier Giancarlo Parretti, acquiring a significant stake in Cannon, and Cannon put Commonwealth up for sale. Renta subsequently acquired complete control of Commonwealth in January 1988. One month later, Renta announced the formation of a joint venture with United Artists Theatres, a theater chain then controlled by Tele-Communications Inc. Under the terms of the joint venture, each party would control 50% of Commonwealth. Later press reports characterize the transfer of ownership as a purchase by United Artists, rather than a joint venture.

By 1991, the downtown Kansas City headquarters building had closed. United Artists reportedly sold off many former Commonwealth screens on a market-by-market basis.
