= Rosenwald Building =

- U.S. National Register of Historic Places
- NM State Register of Cultural Properties
- Albuquerque Historic Landmark
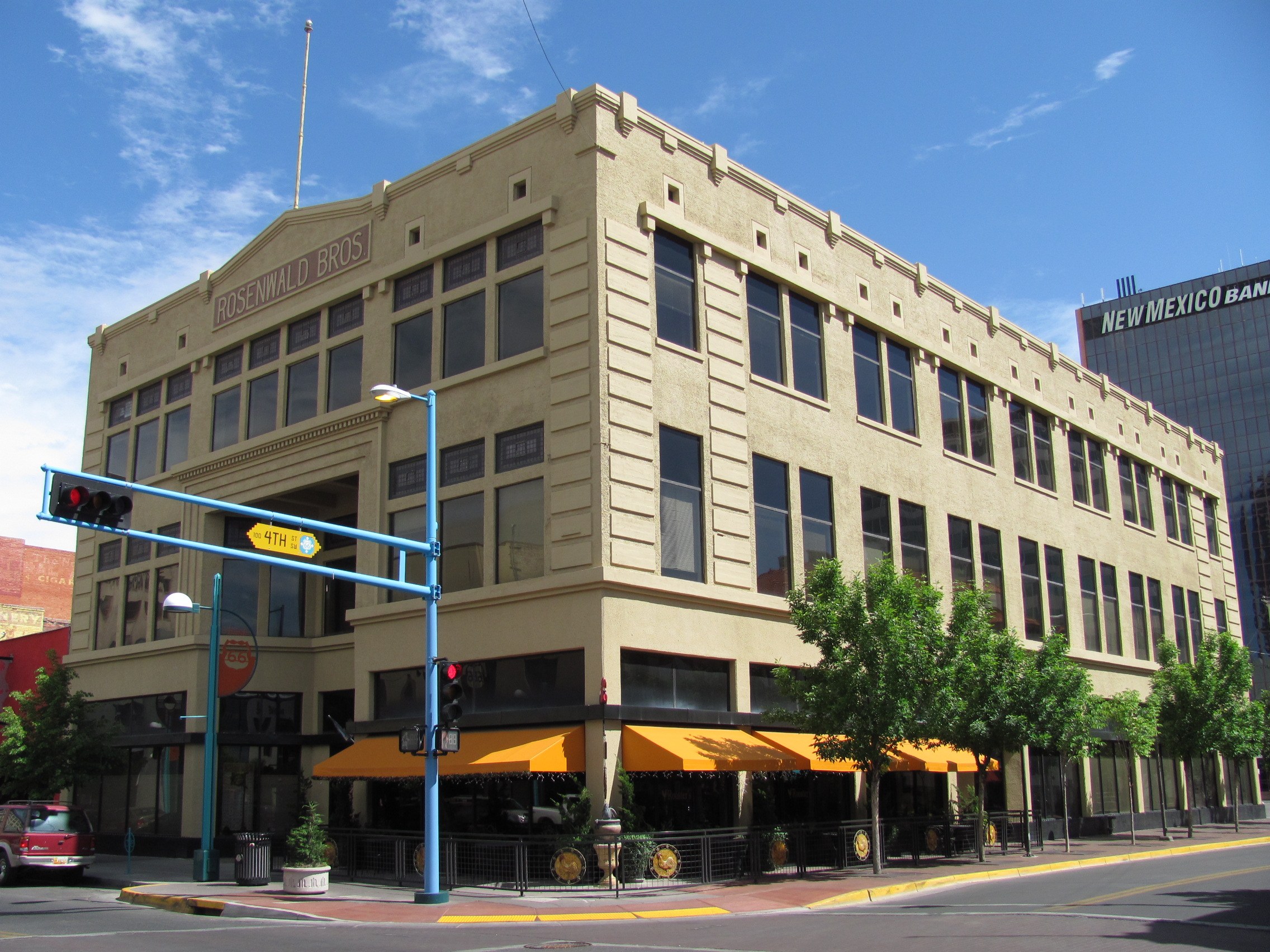
- Rosenwald Building, May 2010
- Location: 320 Central Avenue SW, Albuquerque, New Mexico
- Coordinates: 35°05′03″N 106°39′05″W
- Built: 1910
- Architect: Henry Trost
- NRHP reference No.: 78001806
- NMSRCP No.: 588

Significant dates
- Added to NRHP: June 29, 1978
- Designated NMSRCP: January 20, 1978

The Rosenwald Building is a historic building located in Downtown Albuquerque, New Mexico. Designed by Henry Trost of the El Paso firm of Trost & Trost and built in 1910, it was the first reinforced concrete building in the city. It is a massive three-story building with a two-story recessed entrance and simple geometric ornamentation. The building was added to the New Mexico State Register of Cultural Properties and the National Register of Historic Places in 1978.

Originally the entire 42,000-square-foot building was occupied by Aron and Edward Rosenwald's flagship department store, which was praised by the Albuquerque Journal as "the handsomest, most up-to-date, and most complete department store in the southwest" upon opening. McLellan Stores moved into the ground floor in 1927, remaining there for about 50 years. The Rosenwald Building was renovated in 1981 and the upper floors were converted to office space. The city of Albuquerque bought two floors of the building in 2008.
