= New Mexico State Register of Cultural Properties =

Register of historic and prehistoric places

The New Mexico State Register of Cultural Properties is a register of historic and prehistoric properties located in the state of New Mexico. It is maintained by the New Mexico Historic Preservation Division of the New Mexico Department of Cultural Affairs. The Cultural Properties Review Committee meets at least six times a year. The committee lists properties in the State Register and forwards nominations to the National Register.

== Current listings ==
Properties listed on the New Mexico State Register of Cultural Properties:

- San Miguel, Church of
- Route 66 & Nat'l Old Trails Rd Hist Dist at La Bajada
- Fort McRae (LA 4983)
- Carrie Tingley Hospital Historic District
- Thomas Branigan Memorial Library
- Couse, Eanger Irving, House and Studio and Sharp, Joseph Henry, Studios
- Ozark Trails Marker at Lake Arthur
- St. Joseph Apache Mission Church
- New Mexico Madonna of the Trail
- Agua Fria Schoolhouse Site (LA 2)
- El Camino Real de Tierra Adentro, N Arroyo Alamillo Sect
- Oliver Lee Dog Canyon Ranch
- Raton Pass Scenic Highway
- Gallup Commercial Historic District
- Paul Laurence Dunbar Elementary School
- Tortugas Pueblo Fiesta of Our Lady of Guadalupe
- Roswell Artist-in-Residence Compound
- Lincoln Jackson School
- Casa del Gavilan
- St. John's Cathedral
- Main Library, Albuquerque
- John Gaw Meem Architects Office
- Georgia O'Keeffe Ghost Ranch House
- Burnt Corn Archaeological District
- Hyde Memorial State Park

=== Not in the boundaries of New Mexico ===
Nominated due to connections with New Mexico people and institutions, not because it is a territorial claim of New Mexico.

	Name	Image	Location	Description
1946	Tranquility Base		Mare Tranquillitatis, Moon; 00°41′15″N 23°26′00″E	Scientific and other facilities used during the Apollo 11 mission

=== Multiple counties ===
	Name	Image	Location	Description
363	High Road to Taos		Santa Fe to Taos; 35°53′49″N 106°1′12″W	Scenic route passing through the Sangre de Cristo Mountains
1952	Camino Real in New Mexico, AD 1598-1881	100px	Multiple	MPDF
1953	Camino Real - La Bajada Mesa Section	100px	Santa Fe	
1954	Camino Real - Canon de Las Bocas Section	100px	Santa Fe	
1955	Camino Real - Los Alamitas Section	100px	Santa Fe	
1956	Camino Real - Qualacu Pueblo	100px	Socorro	
1957	Camino Real - San Pasqual Pueblo	100px	Socorro	
1958	Camino Real - Jornada Lakes Section	100px	Sierra	
1959	Camino Real - Yost Draw Section	100px	Sierra	
1960	Camino Real - Point of Rocks Section	100px	Sierra	
1961	Camino Real - Rincon Arroyo - Perillo Section	100px	Dona Ana	
1962	Camino Real - San Diego South Section	100px	Dona Ana	
1963	Camino Real - San Diego North-South Section	100px	Dona Ana	

=== Bernalillo County ===
	Name	Image	Location	Description	
39	San Felipe de Neri Church		Old Town Plaza, Albuquerque; 35°5′48″N 106°40′11″W		
277	Occidental Life Building		119 3rd Street SW, Albuquerque		
336	Hodgin Hall		University of New Mexico main campus, Albuquerque; 35°04′54″N 106°37′31″W		
366	Atchison, Topeka & Santa Fe Railway Locomotive 2926				
380	Salvador Armijo House		618 Rio Grande Blvd. NW, Albuquerque; 35°5′58″N 106°40′10″W		
383	First Methodist Episcopal Church		315 Coal Avenue SW, Albuquerque		
388	Scholes Hall		University of New Mexico main campus, Albuquerque; 35°05′07″N 106°37′25″W		
397	Southwestern Brewery and Ice Company		601 Commercial St. NE, Albuquerque, New Mexico; 35°5′20″N 106°38′44″W	Built in 1899, the Southwestern Brewery and Ice Company building is one of the few surviving 19th-century commercial buildings in downtown Albuquerque.	
453	KiMo Theater		423 Central Avenue NW, Albuquerque		
480	Gutiérrez Hubbell House		6029 Isleta Boulevard SW; 34°59′20″N 106°41′47″W		
508	Old Albuquerque High School		Central Avenue and Broadway Boulevard, Albuquerque		
588	Rosenwald Building		320 Central Avenue SW, Albuquerque		
660	First National Bank Building		217-233 Central Avenue NW, Albuquerque		
700	Federal Building and United States Courthouse		421 Gold Avenue SW, Albuquerque		
704	Kelvinator House		324 Hermosa Drive SE, Albuquerque		
737	Harwood School		<114 7th Street NW, Albuquerque		
784	Skinner Building		722 Central Avenue SW, Albuquerque		
787	New Mexico-Arizona Wool Warehouse		520 1st Street NW, Albuquerque		
880	Werner-Gilchrist House		202 Cornell Drive SE, Albuquerque	Demolished November 2011	
991	Nob Hill Business Center		3500 Central Avenue SE, Albuquerque		
992	Old Hilton Hotel		125 2nd Street NW, Albuquerque		
1170	Sunshine Building		120 Central Avenue SW, Albuquerque; 35°5′3″N 106°38′56″W		
1171	Solar Building		<213 Truman Street NE, Albuquerque		
1412	Estufa		University of New Mexico main campus, Albuquerque; 35°05′02″N 106°37′33″W		
1453	Carlisle Gymnasium		University of New Mexico main campus, Albuquerque; 35°05′01″N 106°37′22″W		
1455	Sara Raynolds Hall		University of New Mexico main campus, Albuquerque		
1568	Jones Motor Company		3222 Central Avenue SE, Albuquerque		
1644	Coronado School		601 4th Street NW, Albuquerque		
1659	Ernie Pyle House/Library		800 Girard Boulevard SE, Albuquerque		
1693	Simms Building		400 Gold Avenue SW, Albuquerque		
1837	De Anza Motor Lodge		4301 Central Avenue NE, Albuquerque	Partially demolished 2017-18	
1853	Southern Union Gas Company Building		723 Silver Avenue SW, Albuquerque		
2026	Zimmerman Library			University of New Mexico main campus	Meem MPDF

=== Catron County ===
	Name	Image	Location	Description
424	Ake Site			

=== Colfax County ===
	Name	Image	Location	Description	
28	St. James Hotel		617 S Collison Ave, Cimarron	Colfax	Historic hotel, restaurant and bar built in 1872
1611	Villa Philmonte Historic District		Philmont Scout Ranch, 401 NM Highway 21, Cimarron	Built 1926–27 as the vacation home of Waite Phillips and his family. Gifted to the Boy Scouts of America in 1941.	

=== Doña Ana County ===
	Name	Image	Location	Description
36	Fort Fillmore		32°15′28″N 106°44′36″W	

=== Luna County ===
	Name	Image	Location	Description
35	Fort Cummings		32°27′56″N 107°38′45″W	
584	Deming Armory		301 South Silver Avenue, Deming; 32°16′0.02″N 107°45′24.39″W	Built for the National Guard in 1915–16, it was the first armory to be built after New Mexico became a state in 1912, and was used during Pancho Villa's raid on Columbus

=== Mora County ===
	Name	Image	Location	Description
32	Wagon Mound		36°0′26″N 104°42′26″W	Landmark on the Santa Fe Trail
33	Watrous/La Junta		35°48′3″N 105°0′5″W	Settlement at the junction of the Mountain and Cimarron Cutoff routes of the Santa Fe Trail

=== San Juan County ===
	Name	Image	Location	Description
21	Salmon Ruins		36°42′4″N 108°1′38″W	Chacoan site located in northwest New Mexico
105	Pictured Cliffs Archeological Site	100px	restricted coordinates	

=== Santa Fe County ===
	Name	Image	Location	Description
83	Davey, Randall, House		Top of Canyon Road, Santa Fe; 35°41′23″N 105°53′17″W	
2074	El Rancho de las Golondrinas		334 Los Pinos Road	District
1901	Arroyo Hondo Pueblo	100px	Arroyo Hondo	

=== Socorro County ===
	Name	Image	Location	Description
30	Trinity Site		33°40′38″N 106°28′31″W	Site of the first nuclear weapons test

=== Taos County ===
	Name	Image	Location	Description
503	Ojo Caliente Mineral Springs Barn	500 yards north of West term of State Road 414		
802	Taos Inn		Paseo Del Pueblo Norte, Taos	
1841	D. H. Lawrence Ranch Historic District		near San Cristobal; 36°34′55″N 105°35′37″W	

=== Torrance County ===
	Name	Image	Location	Description
1	Abo Mission Ruin NR & NHL		34°26′56″N 106°22′17″W	Tanoan site located in central New Mexico

== Former listings ==
	Name	Image	Location	County	Description
796	Santa Fe Depot		314 1st St. SW, Albuquerque; 35°4′56″N 106°38′52″W	Bernalillo	Burned down in 1993

== See also ==
- List of National Historic Landmarks in New Mexico
- National Register of Historic Places listings in New Mexico
