= Timeline of Albuquerque, New Mexico =

Coordinates: 35.110°N 106.610°W

The following is a timeline of the history of the city of Albuquerque, New Mexico, US.

== History as a town ==
- 1706 – Town founded as a trading post between the Tiwa Puebloan peoples and the Hispanos in Nuevo México by Francisco Cuervo y Valdés for New Spain.
- 1793 – San Felipe de Neri Church built.
- 1837 – Unrest.
- 1846 – U.S. army fort built.
- 1850 – Town becomes part of U.S. New Mexico Territory.
- 1862 – Town occupied by Confederate troops before being retaken by the Union Army.
- 1867 – Military post closes.
- 1873 – Jesuit College established.
- 1879 – Albuquerque High School established.
- 1880
  - Atchison, Topeka and Santa Fe Railway depot built near town.
  - New town platted.
  - Albuquerque Daily Journal newspaper begins publication.
  - Albuquerque Indian School and Albuquerque Street Railway Company established.
- 1881
  - Territorial Exposition held.
  - Menaul School established.
- 1882
  - First Methodist Episcopal Church built in new town.
  - Albuquerque Browns baseball team and St. Vincent Academy established.
  - Park Van Tassel makes the first balloon flight in New Mexico Territory on July 4 at New Town.
- 1883
  - Germania club founded.
  - Ladies' Library Association active.
- 1885
  - New town of Albuquerque chartered.
  - Henry Jaffa elected mayor of new town.
- 1889 – University of New Mexico founded.
- 1890 – Population: 3,785.

== History as a city ==
- 1891
  - New Albuquerque incorporated as a city.
  - El Defensor del Pueblo newspaper begins publication.
- 1894 – Harwood Industrial School established.
- 1895 – La Bandera Americana newspaper begins publication.
- 1897 – El Nuevo Mundo newspaper begins publication.
- 1899 – Southwestern Brewery and Ice Company building constructed.
- 1901 – Albuquerque Public Library opens.
- 1902 – Alvarado Hotel in business.
- 1903
  - Albuquerque Business College established.
  - American Lumber Company mill opens.
- 1904 – Electric streetcar begins operating.
- 1906 – Southwest Presbyterian Sanatorium founded.
- 1910 – Population: 11,020.
- 1912
  - City becomes part of the new State of New Mexico.
  - New Mexico State Fair begins.
  - Albuquerque Independent Society formed.
  - "First meeting of the New Mexico League of Municipalities was held in Albuquerque"
- 1914
  - Albuquerque High School building constructed.
  - Home Circle Club chartered.
- 1917 – City Charter adopted.
- 1919 – New Mexico Workers Chronicle begins publication.
- 1920 – People's Sanatorium opens.
- 1922 – First National Bank Building (Albuquerque) constructed.
- 1924 – Sunshine Theatre opens.
- 1925 – Santa Fe Railway Shops (Albuquerque) built.
- 1926 – Courthouse relocated to New Town from Old Town.
- 1927
  - Rio Grande Zoo opens.
  - KiMo Theater built.
- 1928
  - Oxnard Field, Albuquerque's first airport, is constructed.
  - KGGM radio begins broadcasting.
- 1929
  - First commercial airline service by Western Air Express and Transcontinental Air Transport
  - West Mesa Airport constructed.
- 1930 – Transcontinental Air Transport and Western Air Express merge to become TWA.
- 1932 – Museum of Anthropology of the University of New Mexico established.
- 1933 – KKOB (AM) radio headquartered in city.
- 1934 – Continental Airlines begins service.
- 1936 – Albuquerque Little Theater dedicated.
- 1938 – Lobo Theater and New Mexico State Fair grounds open.
- 1939
  - Albuquerque Municipal Airport constructed.
  - Hilton Hotel built.
- 1942 – Kirtland Air Force Base established.
- 1942-1944 – Royal Air Force cadets, flying from the British base at Terrell, Texas, fly to Albuquerque frequently on training flights, using it as a stand-in for Warsaw, Poland.
- 1943 – POW Camp Albuquerque established.
- 1946 – U.S. military Sandia Base (nuclear weapons installation) active.
- 1947 – Old Town Historical Society established.
- 1948 – Ernie Pyle House/Library branch established.
- 1949 – Old Town annexed to city.
- 1954 – Simms Building constructed.
- 1956 – Albuquerque Petroleum Club founded.
- 1957 – Tingley Coliseum dedicated.
- 1959 – Uncle Cliff's Kiddieland opens.
- 1960 – New Mexico Genealogical Society headquartered in city.
- 1961
  - Winrock Shopping Center in business.
  - Bank of New Mexico Building constructed.
  - TWA begins the first commercial jet service with the Boeing 707 and the Convair 880.
- 1963
  - Circle Autoscope Drive-In cinema opens.
  - First National Bank Building East constructed.
  - Albuquerque Municipal Airport renamed to Albuquerque Sunport
- 1965
  - New terminal opens at the Albuquerque Sunport.
  - Coronado Center shopping mall in business.
  - Albuquerque Press Club founded.
- 1967 – Albuquerque Museum of Art and History established.
- 1970 – Anti-war protest.
- 1972
  - Albuquerque International Balloon Fiesta begins.
  - Glenwood Hills Association established.
- 1974
  - City adopts mayor-council form of government.
  - TWA begins the first jumbo jet aircraft service with the Lockheed 1011.
- 1976 – Indian Pueblo Cultural Center opens.
- 1979
  - National Solar Thermal Test Facility established.
  - TWA begins the first nonstop flights to New York.
  - American Airlines begins service.
- 1980
  - Southwest Airlines begins service.
  - Population: 331,767.
- 1982 United Airlines begins service.
- 1983 Delta Air Lines begins service.
- 1986
  - Albuquerque Petroleum Building constructed.
  - New Mexico Museum of Natural History and Science founded.
- 1987-1989 Albuquerque International Sunport undergoes a major expansion.
- 1990
  - Albuquerque Plaza built.
  - American International Rattlesnake Museum opens.
  - Population: 384,736.
- 1991 – National Museum of Nuclear Science & History chartered.
- 1993 – ¡Explora! Science Center and Children's Museum opens.
- 1994 - Albuquerque Poetry Slam begins.
- 1996
  - April: City website online.
  - Rio Grande Botanic Garden and Albuquerque Aquarium open.
  - Cottonwood Mall (Albuquerque, New Mexico) in business.
- 1997 – Jim Baca elected mayor.
- 2000 – National Hispanic Cultural Center opens.
- 2002 – Alvarado Transportation Center opens.
- 2003 – Metropolitan Courthouse built.
- 2004 – Albuquerque Sikh Gurudwara established.
- 2005
  - Duke City Derby (roller derby) league formed.
  - Anderson-Abruzzo Albuquerque International Balloon Museum opens.
  - ¡Globalquerque! music fest begins.
- 2007 – Alamosa Skatepark built.
- 2009 – Richard J. Berry becomes mayor.
- 2010 – Population: 545,852.
- 2011 – I-25/Paseo Del Norte interchange planned.
- 2012 – Population: 555,417.
- 2013 – I-25/Paseo Del Norte interchange construction started.
- 2015 – Panhandler jobs program begins.
- 2017 – Tim Keller is elected Mayor

== See also ==
- History of Albuquerque, New Mexico
- List of mayors of Albuquerque
- List of historic landmarks in Albuquerque
- National Register of Historic Places listings in Bernalillo County, New Mexico

== Bibliography ==
Published in the 19th century

- "New Mexico: Albuquerque", Where to Go to Become Rich: Farmers', Miners' and Tourists' Guide to Kansas, New Mexico, Arizona and Colorado, Chicago: Belford, Clarke & Co., 1880
- "Albuquerque". Complete Business Directory of New Mexico, and Gazetteer of the Territory for 1882. Santa Fe: New Mexican Printing and Publishing Company. 1882.
- William M. Berger (1883), "Albuquerque", Berger's tourists' guide to New Mexico, Kansas City, Mo: Ramsey, Millett & Hudson, OCLC 16658991
- "Albuquerque". Colorado, New Mexico, Utah, Nevada, Wyoming and Arizona Gazetteer and Business Directory. Chicago: Polk & Co. and A.C. Danser. 1884.
- C.A. Higgins (1894), "New Mexico: Albuquerque", New guide to the Pacific coast, Chicago: Rand, McNally, OCLC 2163219

Published in the 20th century

- Hudspeth Directory Company. Hudspeth's Albuquerque City Directory. El Paso: 1901, 1904, 1907–1956.
- Max. Frost and Paul A.F. Walter, eds. (1906), "Albuquerque", Land of sunshine: a handbook of the resources, products, industries and climate of New Mexico, Santa Fé, NM: New Mexico Bureau of Immigration, OCLC 1806416
- H.B. Hening and E. Dana Johnson (1908), Albuquerque, New Mexico, Chief City of a New Empire in the Great Southwest, Albuquerque.
- "Albuquerque" . Encyclopædia Britannica. Vol. 1 (11th ed.). 1910. p. 516.
- Hudspeth's Albuquerque City Directory. 1919 – via Google Books.
- George Wharton James (1920), "Albuquerque, the Commercial Metropolis of New Mexico", New Mexico, Boston: Page Company
- Federal Writers' Project (1940). "Albuquerque". New Mexico: a Guide to the Colorful State. American Guide Series. New York: Hastings House. p. 173+. hdl:2027/mdp.39015012922400.
- George Fitzpatrick; Harvey Caplin (1976), Albuquerque: 100 years in pictures, 1875-1975 (2nd ed.), Albuquerque, N.M: Modern Press, ISBN 091075036X
- Marc Simmons (1982), Albuquerque: A Narrative History, Albuquerque: UNM Press.
- George Thomas Kurian (1994), "Albuquerque", World Encyclopedia of Cities, Vol. 1: North America, Santa Barbara, Calif.: ABC-CLIO, OL 1431653M (fulltext via Open Library)
- Michael F. Logan (1995), "Albuquerque", Fighting Sprawl and City Hall: resistance to urban growth in the Southwest, Tucson: University of Arizona Press, p. 95+, ISBN 0816515123
- John A. Jakle; et al. (1996), "The Motel in Albuquerque", The Motel in America, Johns Hopkins University Press, ISBN 9780801869181
- Benny J. Andres Jr. (2000). "La Plaza Vieja (Old Town Alburquerque): the Transformation of a Hispano Village, 1880s-1950s". In David Maciel, Erlinda Gonzales-Berry (ed.). The Contested Homeland: a Chicano History of New Mexico. University of New Mexico Press. p. 239+. ISBN 0826321992.

Published in the 21st century

- David Kammer. "Albuquerque's 20th-Century Suburban Growth". New Mexico Office of the State Historian. New Mexico State Record Center and Archives. circa 2004
- "Albuquerque History Timeline". Albuquerque Tricentennial. Albuquerque Historical Society. 2008.
- Susan McAllister, ed. (2008), A bigger boat: the unlikely success of the Albuquerque poetry slam scene, Albuquerque: University of New Mexico Press, ISBN 9780826344830
- "Fiscal Year 2014 Approved Budget". City of Albuquerque. 2013.
- "Albuquerque, NM". U.S. City Open Data Census. Sunlight Foundation and Open Knowledge International. 2018. Archived from the original on November 18, 2018.
