= List of tallest buildings in Albuquerque =

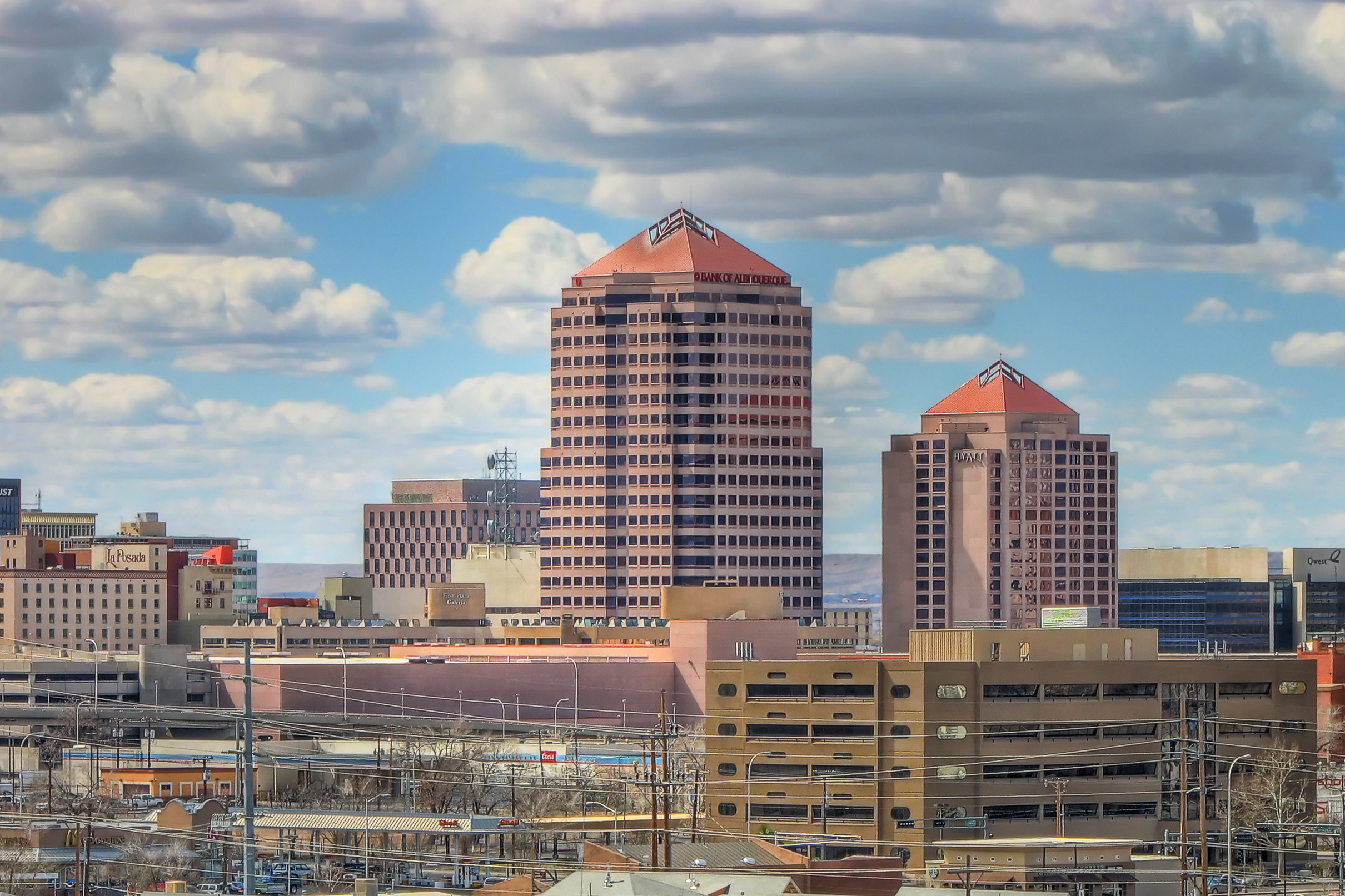
Skyline of Albuquerque

This list of tallest buildings in Albuquerque ranks high-rises in the U.S. city of Albuquerque, New Mexico by height. The tallest building in Albuquerque is the 22-story Albuquerque Plaza Office Tower, which rises 351 feet (107 m) and was completed in 1990. It also stands as the tallest building in the state of New Mexico. The third-tallest building in Albuquerque is the Compass Bank Building which stood as the tallest building in the city and the state from 1966 until 1990.

== History ==
Skyscrapers in Albuquerque began with the construction of the First National Bank Building in 1922, which is often regarded as the first skyscraper in New Mexico. The building, listed on the National Register of Historic Places, is now a residential tower known officially as "The Bank Lofts".

Albuquerque went through a large building boom that lasted from the early 1960s to the early 1990s, during which time 20 of the city's 26 tallest buildings were constructed, including the Albuquerque Plaza complex. Most of Albuquerque's tall buildings are located in either Downtown or Uptown Albuquerque; however, there are some high-rises scattered throughout other areas of the city, including the Bank of the West Tower, which stands as the tallest building outside Downtown. Albuquerque has 36 completed high-rise buildings, more than any other city in New Mexico.

== Tallest buildings ==
This lists ranks Albuquerque high-rises that stand at least 135 feet (41 m) tall, based on standard height measurement. An equal sign (=) following a rank indicates the same height between two or more buildings. The "Year" column indicates the year in which a building was completed.

Rank	Name	Image	Height ft / m	Floors	Year	Notes
1	Albuquerque Plaza Office Tower		351 / 107	22	1990	Tallest building in the state of New Mexico. Tallest building constructed in Albuquerque in the 1990s. Formerly known as the Bank of America Tower.
2	The Clyde Hotel		256 / 78	21	1990	Tallest all-hotel building in the state.
3	BBVA (formerly Compass Bank Building)		238 / 73	18	1966	Tallest building constructed in the city in the 1960s.
4	500 Marquette		235 / 72	15	1986	Tallest building constructed in Albuquerque in the 1980s.
5	Bank of the West Tower		213 / 65	17	1963	2nd tallest building constructed in the 1960s and tallest building in the city located outside of Downtown Albuquerque.
6	New Mexico Bank & Trust Building		203 / 62	14	1961	3rd tallest building constructed in the 1960s.
7	Dennis Chavez Federal Building		197 / 60	13	1965	4th tallest building constructed in the city in the 1960s.
8	PNM Building		184 / 56	12	1968	
9	Simms Building		180 / 55	13	1954	1st modern high-rise building constructed in Albuquerque.
10	Pete V. Domenici United States Courthouse		176 / 54	7	1997	
11	Metropolitan Courthouse		175 / 53	9	2003	Tallest building in Albuquerque built in 2000's
12	Wells Fargo Bank Building		174 / 53	13	1973	
13=	Doubletree Hotel		166 / 51	16	1975	
13=	Lovelace Medical Center		166 / 51	12	1968	Tallest hospital building in New Mexico.
15	Park Plaza Condominiums		160 / 49	14	1965	Tallest residential building in New Mexico.
16	One Civic Plaza		158 / 48	11	1985	
17	Albuquerque Marriott		156 / 48	17	1982	
18	Bernalillo County Courthouse		154 / 47	8	2001	
19	City Place		150 / 46	10	1980	
20	Sheraton Albuquerque Airport		147 / 45	14	1972	
21=	Two Park Square		145 / 44	10	1989	
21=	Ameriwest Financial Center		145 / 44	10	1985	
23	The Bank Lofts		141 / 43	9	1923	Formerly known as the First National Bank Building. Tallest building constructed in the city in the 1920s.
24=	Two Park Central Tower		140 / 43	10	1975	
24=	Veterans Administration Medical Center		140 / 43	6	1986	
26	Hotel Andaluz		135 / 41	10	1939	Tallest building constructed in Albuquerque in the 1930s.

== Timeline of tallest buildings ==
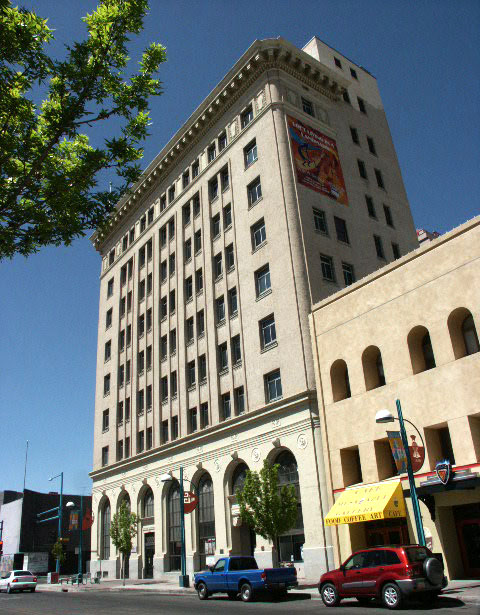
The First National Bank Building, now known as "The Bank Lofts", the tallest building in Albuquerque from 1922 until 1954

This lists buildings that once held the title of tallest building in Albuquerque. Since 1990, this title has been held by the Albuquerque Plaza Office Tower.

Name	Street address	Years as tallest	Height ft / m	Floors	Reference
First National Bank Building^{[A]}	217-233 Central Avenue NW	1922–1954	141 / 43	9	
Simms Building	400 Gold Avenue SW	1954–1961	180 / 55	13	
New Mexico Bank & Trust Building	320 Gold Avenue SW	1961–1963	203 / 62	14	
Bank of the West Tower	5301 Central Avenue NE	1963–1966	213 / 65	17	
BBVA (formerly Compass Bank Building)	505 Marquette Avenue NW	1966–1990	238 / 73	18	
Albuquerque Plaza Office Tower	201 Third Street NW	1990–present	351 / 107	22	

== Notes ==
A. This building was constructed as the First National Bank Building, and is still commonly referred to as such, but is now officially known as "The Bank Lofts".
