= List of United States federal courthouses in New Mexico =

Following is a list of current and former courthouses of the United States federal court system located in New Mexico. Each entry indicates the name of the building along with an image, if available, its location and the jurisdiction it covers, the dates during which it was used for each such jurisdiction, and, if applicable the person for whom it was named, and the date of renaming. Dates of use will not necessarily correspond with the dates of construction or demolition of a building, as pre-existing structures may be adapted or court use, and former court buildings may later be put to other uses. Also, the official name of the building may be changed at some point after its use as a federal court building has been initiated.

== Courthouses ==
Courthouse	City	Image	Street address	Jurisdiction	Dates of use	Named for
Old Post Office†	Albuquerque		123 4th Street	D.N.M.	1924–1930	n/a
Federal Building and U.S. Courthouse^{†}	Albuquerque		421 Gold Avenue SW	D.N.M.	1930–present	n/a
Dennis Chavez Federal Building	Albuquerque		500 Gold Avenue SW	D.N.M.	1972–1998	U.S. Senator Dennis Chavez
Pete V. Domenici U.S. Courthouse	Albuquerque		333 Lomas Boulevard NW	D.N.M.	1998–present	U.S. Senator Pete Domenici (2004)
Las Cruces Judicial Complex	Las Cruces		135 East Griggs Avenue	D.N.M.	1924–1974; Now the Las Cruces Judicial Complex, Municipal Court	n/a
Harold Runnels Federal Building	Las Cruces		200 East Griggs Avenue	D.N.M.	?–2010; Still in use by federal government offices	Harold Lowell Runnels (1983)
U.S. Courthouse	Las Cruces		100 North Church Street	D.N.M.	2010–present	n/a
U.S. Post Office & Courthouse†	Las Vegas		901 Douglas Avenue	D.N.M.	1928–? Now the Las Vegas City Schools Administration Building.	n/a
U.S. Post Office & Courthouse	Roswell		300 North Richardson Avenue	D.N.M.	1924–1961; Completed in 1913; razed in 1971	n/a
Federal Building and U.S. Courthouse	Roswell		500 North Richardson Avenue	D.N.M.	?–present	n/a
Santiago E. Campos U.S. Courthouse†	Santa Fe		106 South Federal Place	D.N.M.	1889–present	District Court judge Santiago E. Campos (2004)

== Key ==
^{†}	Listed on the National Register of Historic Places (NRHP)
^{††}	NRHP-listed and also designated as a National Historic Landmark
