= Dennis Chavez Federal Building =

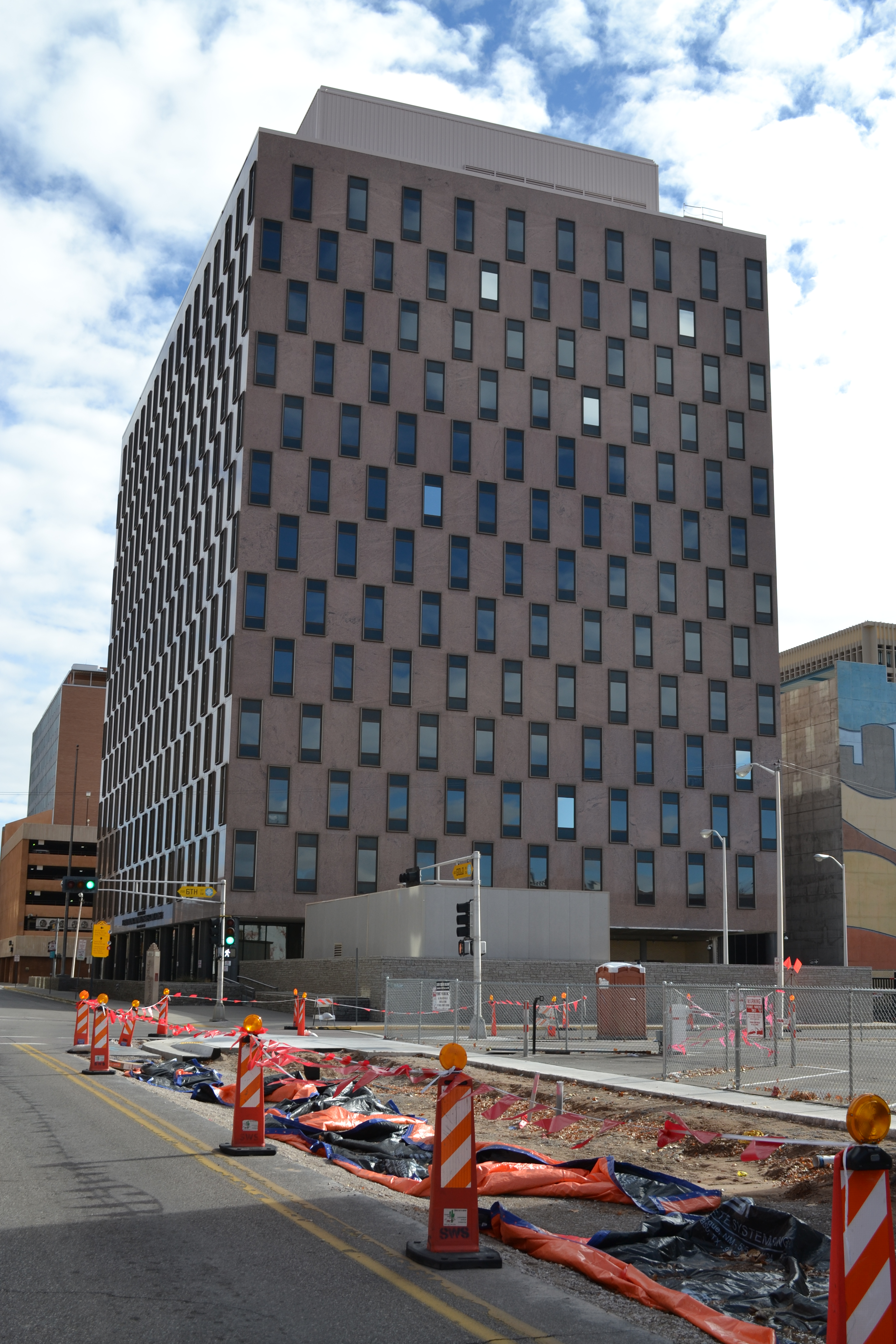
- The west elevation of the Dennis Chavez Federal Building

General information
- Status: Completed
- Type: Office
- Location: 500 Gold Avenue SW; Albuquerque
- Coordinates: 35.083472°N 106.653433°W
- Completed: 1965

Height
- Roof: 60 m (200 ft)

Technical details
- Floor count: 13
- Floor area: 300,000 square feet (28,000 m^{2})

Design and construction
- Architect: Flatow, Moore, Bryan, and Fairburn
- Main contractor: Hegeman-Harris Company
- Federal Building and U.S. Courthouse
- U.S. National Register of Historic Places
- NM State Register of Cultural Properties
- NRHP reference No.: 100009558
- NMSRCP No.: 2078

Significant dates
- Added to NRHP: November 14, 2023
- Designated NMSRCP: November 23, 2023

The Dennis Chavez Federal Building is a high-rise federal office building and courthouse located at 500 Gold Avenue SW in Downtown Albuquerque, New Mexico. It was completed in 1965 and was built with the purpose of housing the U.S. District Court as well as offices of various federal agencies including the U.S. Postal Service, Veterans Administration, U.S. Public Health Service, U.S. Fish and Wildlife Service, and Bureau of Indian Affairs. Originally known simply as the U.S. Courthouse and Federal Office Building, the building was renamed in honor of longtime U.S. Senator Dennis Chavez in 1976.

The Dennis Chavez Building was designed by the Albuquerque firm of Flatow, Moore, Bryan, and Fairburn, which had previously been responsible for other local highrises like the Simms Building and Bank of the West Tower. The steel-framed building is faced with polished granite, with New Mexico marble used in the ground floor lobby. It is 197 feet (60 m) in height and has 13 above-ground floors with a basement and underground parking garage. Hegeman-Harris Company of New York City was the general contractor. When built, it was the third-tallest building in New Mexico after the Bank of the West Tower and the New Mexico Bank & Trust Building. It is currently the seventh-tallest building in Albuquerque.

The District Court relocated to the newly built Pete V. Domenici United States Courthouse in 1998, but the U.S. Bankruptcy Court is still housed in the Dennis Chavez Building. The building was listed on the National Register of Historic Places in 2023.

== See also ==
- List of tallest buildings in Albuquerque
