= Compass Bank Building (Albuquerque) =

Building in New Mexico, United States

505 Marquette Avenue NW
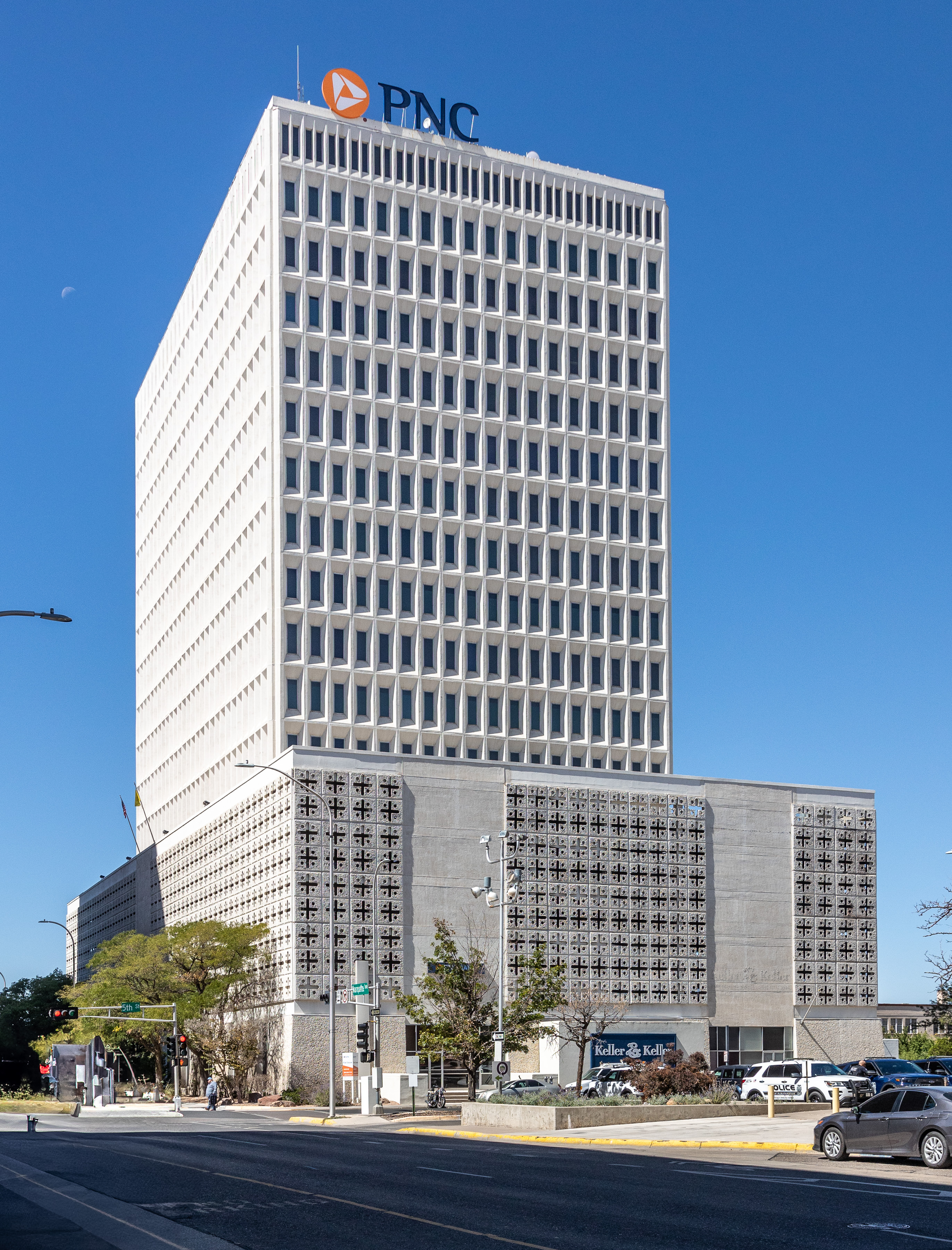
- Viewed from 6th Street NW
- Interactive map of the 505 Marquette Avenue NW area
- Former names: Compass Bank Building, National Building

Record height
- Preceded by: Bank of the West Tower
- Surpassed by: Albuquerque Plaza

General information
- Type: Commercial offices
- Location: 505 Marquette Avenue NW; Albuquerque, New Mexico
- Coordinates: 35.0886°N 106.6525°W
- Construction started: 1965
- Completed: 1966

Height
- Antenna spire: 82.9 m (272 ft)
- Roof: 72.5 m (238 ft)

Technical details
- Floor count: 18
- Floor area: 232,900 sq ft (21,640 m^{2})

505 Marquette Avenue NW (originally known as the National Building) is a high-rise office building located at 505 Marquette Avenue NW in Downtown Albuquerque, New Mexico. It was the tallest building in New Mexico upon its completion and remained the holder of that title until the completion of the Albuquerque Plaza towers in 1990, making it currently the third tallest. It is 238 feet (73 m) tall and has 18 stories, the lowest six of which are occupied by a parking garage. With the rooftop antennas included it reaches a height of 272 feet (83 m).

Ground was broken on the building on January 25, 1965, and it was completed in 1966, surpassing the Bank of the West Tower and becoming the tallest building in the city. The project was developed by the National Building Corporation of Tennessee.

== Architecture ==
The building was designed by William E. Burk, Jr., who also designed the Park Plaza Condominiums. It has twelve floors of office space above a wider six-story base which incorporates a parking garage on floors 2–6. The exterior walls of the parking levels are molded concrete with an open grillwork pattern of stylized quatrefoils inspired by Moorish architecture. The upper floors have recessed rectangular windows arranged in a simple grid pattern with beveled surrounds. At the ground level, the exterior walls are battered masonry punctuated by narrow paired windows on the south side.

== See also ==
- List of tallest buildings in Albuquerque
