= U.S. Eagle Federal Credit Union =

Credit union In United States

- Formerly: Albuquerque U.S. Employees Federal Credit Union; U.S. New Mexico Federal Credit Union
- Industry: Financial services
- Founded: 1935
- Headquarters: Albuquerque, New Mexico, United States
- Number of locations: 9 (2020)
- Key people: Marsha Majors (CEO)
- Total assets: $1.18 billion (2020)
- Members: 77,785 (2020)
- Number of employees: 249 (2020)
- Website: www.useagle.org

U.S. Eagle Federal Credit Union is a credit union founded in 1935 in Albuquerque, New Mexico. They have branches in Albuquerque, Farmington, Santa Fe, and Bernalillo. As of 2020, U.S. Eagle had 79,785 members, 249 employees, and $1.18 billion in assets. In 2019 and 2020, Forbes named U.S. Eagle a Best-in-State Credit Union.

== History ==
U.S. Eagle Federal Credit Union was founded in 1935 under the name Albuquerque U.S. Employees Federal Credit Union. Initially, Albuquerque U.S. Employees Federal Credit Union served federal employees in New Mexico. In 1990, their name was changed to U.S. New Mexico Federal Credit Union to reflect an expanded membership base.

In March 2015, U.S. New Mexico Federal Credit Union announced their name would be changing to U.S. Eagle Federal Credit Union. Earlier that year, U.S. Eagle merged with New Mexico Correctional Employees Federal Credit Union. In December 2015, U.S. Eagle acquired the signage rights for Albuquerque Plaza.
