= Bank of the West Tower (Albuquerque) =

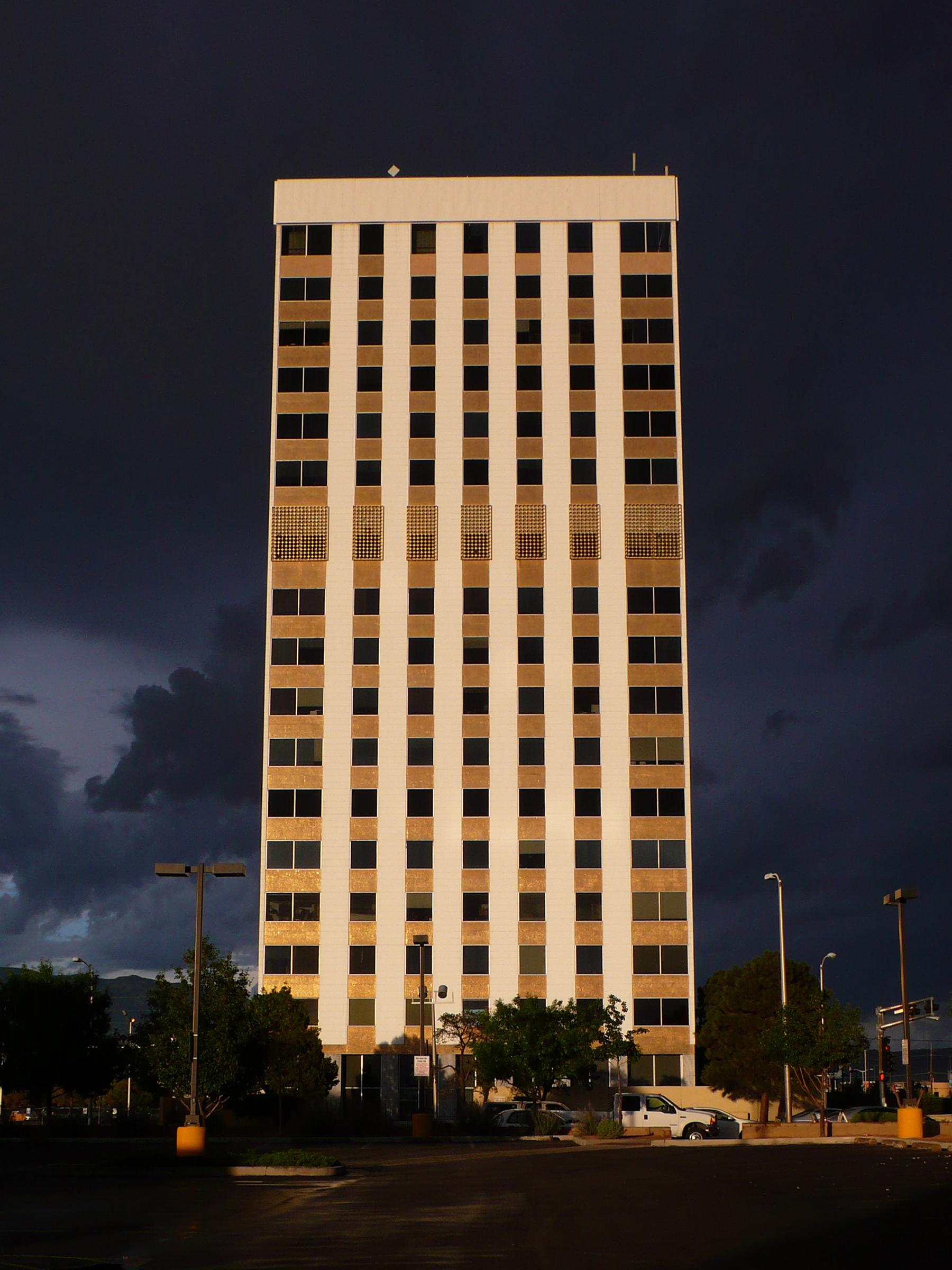
- Bank of the West Tower, seen from the west across San Mateo Blvd.
- Interactive map of the Bank of the West Tower area
- Former names: First National Bank Building East; First Security Bank Building

Record height
- Preceded by: New Mexico Bank & Trust Building
- Surpassed by: Compass Bank Building

General information
- Type: Commercial offices
- Location: 5301 Central Avenue NE. Albuquerque, New Mexico
- Coordinates: 35.078191°N 106.585732°W
- Completed: 1963

Height
- Roof: 64.9 m (213 ft)

Technical details
- Floor count: 17
- Floor area: 106,000 sq ft (9,800 m^{2})

Design and construction
- Architect: Flatow, Moore, Bryan, and Fairburn
- Developer: Del Webb Corp.

Bank of the West Tower is a highrise office building in Albuquerque, New Mexico. It is located on Central Avenue some 3.5 mi (5.6 km) east of Downtown. At 64.9 m (213 ft), the 17-story tower was the tallest building in New Mexico when completed in 1963. It is now the fifth tallest building in the state, and the tallest outside of Downtown Albuquerque. The building was developed by the Del Webb Corporation and designed by the architectural firm of Flatow, Moore, Bryan, and Fairburn. For most of its history, the tower housed a succession of bank branches.

== History ==
The tower was built by the Del Webb Corporation and originally housed the East Central branch of the First National Bank of New Mexico. The original name of the building was First National Bank Building East to avoid confusion with the bank's main building downtown. Groundbreaking ceremonies took place on July 12, 1961, and the bank was officially opened for business on February 16, 1963. During construction, the builders reportedly attached numbers to the side of the building to prevent drivers from being distracted by trying to count the number of floors.

When completed, the 64.9 m (213 ft) tower surpassed the New Mexico Bank & Trust Building to become the tallest in New Mexico. Its construction, far from the existing highrises downtown, reflected an ongoing shift of people and capital from Albuquerque's decaying city center to the more suburban Northeast Heights. The building was intended to become the focal point of a new urban development called First National Bank Center, though ultimately only one other tower was built, an adjacent 10-story office building that once housed the headquarters of Microsoft. With urban renewal efforts underway downtown, the new highrise lost its title as the city's tallest building to the National Building just three years after opening, though it remains the tallest building in the city outside of Downtown.

The First National Bank branch originally occupied the first two floors of the building, while the basement housed the vaults and lock boxes, an event room, and a cafe. The top two floors were reserved for the members-only Albuquerque City Club. The club facilities included a bar, dining room, beauty salon, and saunas on the 16th floor, and a gymnasium and rooftop deck "for dancing, sunbathing and other outside activities" on the 17th floor. The club went out of business after only two years and its space was eventually converted into two residential penthouses, which remained in place as of 2015 along with a rooftop racquetball court. The building's architects, FMBF, had their offices on the 14th floor for many years from its opening.

First National Bank was purchased by First Security Bank in 1993, and the building's name and signage changed accordingly. The tower was renamed again in 2001 when Bank of the West bought the branch. Bank of the West moved out of the tower in 2012. As of February 2021, only 30% of the total property (consisting of this tower and a shorter tower nearby) was leased and in use. As of September 2023, the building is vacant and up for auction.

== Architecture ==
The Bank of the West Tower was designed by the Albuquerque firm of Flatow, Moore, Bryan, and Fairburn, which was also responsible for the nearly identical Del Webb Building in Phoenix (later extensively remodeled). The building has 17 above-ground floors and a basement level, giving a total of 106,000 sq ft (9,800 m^{2}) of floor space. The frame was constructed from poured-in-place reinforced concrete and employed post-tensioned girders to distribute the weight of each floor to the tower's exterior columns and central core, allowing for a column-free interior. The post-tensioning system also reduced the overall height of each story, allowing the developers to add an extra floor without changing the planned height.

The building's ground floor features pillars faced with gray Italian marble framing 28 large plate glass windows. The lobby and banking hall were originally finished in gray and cream-colored marble with walnut and aluminum trim, while "a dark green Grecian marbleized vinyl covering" was used on the upper floors. The elevator lobbies were decorated with fifteen 8-by-12-foot (2.4 by 3.7 m) murals by Alice Garver depicting various aspects of New Mexico history, including indigenous peoples (second floor), covered wagons (10th floor), the Atomic Age (16th floor), and the Duke of Alburquerque (17th floor). Like much of Garver's work, the murals were fragile and have not survived.

On the exterior, white paint and tinted glass were used to reduce the building's cooling load. Each spandrel is faced with gold ceramic tile, which architect Max Flatow described as containing actual 23-karat gold, saying "We would be a richer society if we used our precious things on buildings instead of burying them in the ground." Approximately 2.5 million of the one inch square tiles were required to cover the building. The exterior of the tower is also decorated with gold-colored aluminum screens on the eleventh floor.

The top of the building originally featured the text "FIRST NATIONAL BANK" in illuminated green letters on all four sides. This was replaced in 1993 with "FIRST SECURITY BANK" in red lettering, and then in 2001 with the Bank of the West logo. As of 2012 the building no longer features any exterior signage.

== See also ==
- List of tallest buildings in Albuquerque
