= Federal Building and United States Courthouse (Albuquerque, New Mexico) =

- Federal Building
- U.S. National Register of Historic Places
- NM State Register of Cultural Properties
- The Federal Building in 2013

- Location within New Mexico Location within the United States
- Location: 421 Gold Ave. SW; Albuquerque, New Mexico
- Coordinates: 35°5′2″N 106°39′8″W
- Area: 0.2 acres (0.081 ha)
- Built: 1930
- Architect: Office of the Supervising Architect under James A. Wetmore
- Architectural style: Late 19th And 20th Century Revivals, Mediterranean Style
- NRHP reference No.: 80002533
- NMSRCP No.: 700

Significant dates
- Added to NRHP: November 22, 1980
- Designated NMSRCP: October 20, 1978

The Federal Building and United States Courthouse, erected in 1930, is a historic landmark located in downtown Albuquerque, New Mexico. It is part of the complex of federal buildings on Gold Avenue that includes the Old Post Office, Dennis Chavez Federal Building, and the Federal Building at 517 Gold SW.

The imposing six-story building, faced with limestone and buff-colored terra-cotta tile in a brick pattern with molded inlays, is topped with a Mediterranean-style red tile roof and a domed cupola. The building was designed by the Office of the Supervising Architect under James A. Wetmore.

The lobby of the Federal Building contains a mural by Loren Mozley titled The Rebellion of 1680 which depicts the Pueblo Revolt. Another mural, Justice Tempered with Mercy by Emil Bisttram, adorns the wall outside the District Courtroom on the sixth floor. This historically significant courtroom was used by the U.S. District Court until it relocated to the Dennis Chavez Building in 1965. The courtroom was restored to its original appearance in 1981.

The Federal Building was listed on the National Register of Historic Places in 1980.

== Trivia ==
- This building appeared several times in the 2004 thriller Suspect Zero.
