= Alice Garver =

American painter

Alice Garver (1924–1966) was an American painter and printmaker, particularly known for large-format abstract expressionist drawings and monotype prints. She is recognized as an important Albuquerque, New Mexico artist.

== Personal life and education ==
Garver was born in Toledo, Ohio and studied at the University of Toledo, Toledo Art Museum, and Skidmore College. She married husband Jack Garver in 1946, after which the couple moved to Albuquerque in order for Garver to study at the University of New Mexico under emeritus professor Raymond Jonson. Alice and Jack Garver had three children.

== Artistic works ==
Alice Garver was known for her large-scale drawings and prints, with most produced in the 1950s using a unique printing technique. Her primary technique is described in the book Visualizing Albuquerque:

Garver rolled a solid color onto the matrix and laid the paper on top of the ink. By drawing and pressing on the back of the paper she transferred loose, sketchy marks to the paper. By repeating this process over and over with multiple colors, Garver created highly energetic works at a huge scale for the period.

Garver also produced murals, most notably fifteen eight-by-twelve foot murals in Albuquerque's First National Bank Building East, which depicted various periods of New Mexico history; subjects include the Duke of Alburquerque (17th floor), the atomic age (16th floor), pioneer wagons, and indigenous peoples. The murals were created by sketching images, applying color to rice paper, and subsequent rubbing, with colors adhered to walls with the use of wheat paste. Relatively few works by Garver survive, including the murals, due to their delicate nature.

Both Alice and Jack Garver's work appears to be influenced by the style of Jackson Pollock, particularly the "all-over" linear effect. Their paintings have been described as having "an autonomous quality, as if the painting had somehow, at least in part, materialized by itself, freed from the artist's hand." Alice achieves this effect through transferring color from another surface through rubbing, as described above; the result resembles a "natural discoloration."

Garver was one of 20 Albuquerque artists whose work was displayed in a February 1960 show organized by de Kooning at The Great Jones Gallery in New York City. One of Garver's monoprints--"Sleeping Woman,"which incorporates "classical figuration within expressionism"—was featured in the 2013 South Broadway Cultural Center's exhibition "Albuquerque Art: A Look Back." Another of Garver's monoprints (Untitled landscape, ca. 1950s, monoprint on paper mounted on panel, 40x 95 in.) was also featured in a 2015 exhibition, Visualizing Albuquerque, on display in a number of museums and galleries across Albuquerque.
