= Park Plaza Condominiums =

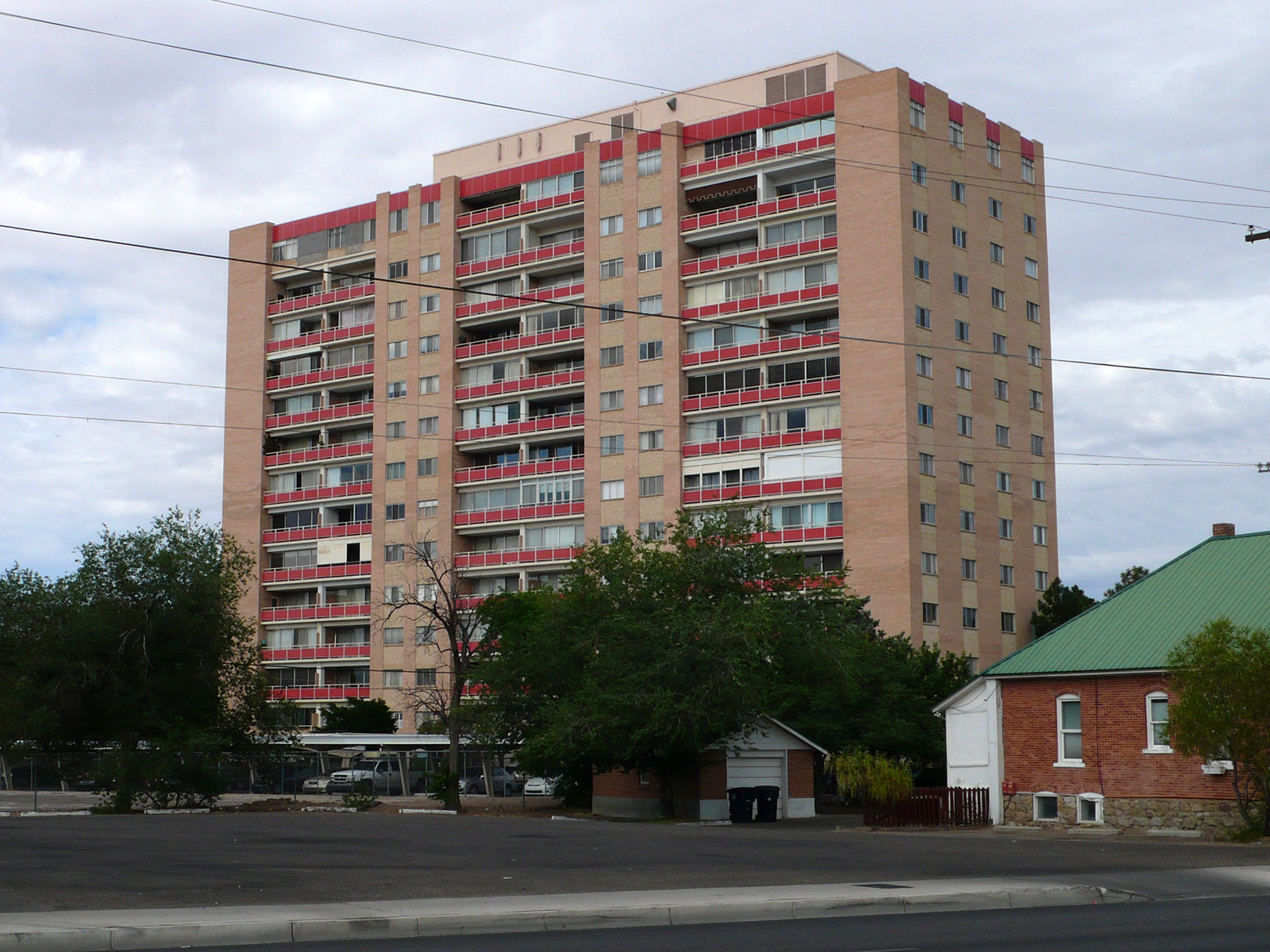
- Interactive map of the Park Plaza Condominiums area

General information
- Type: Residential
- Location: 1331 Park Ave. SW; Albuquerque, New Mexico, United States
- Coordinates: 35°05′14.5″N 106°39′46″W
- Completed: 1964
- Opening: 1964
- Cost: $3 million

Height
- Roof: 160 ft (49 m)

Technical details
- Floor count: 14

Design and construction
- Architects: William E. Burk, Jr.

Park Plaza Condominiums is a residential high-rise building in Albuquerque, New Mexico. At 160 feet (49 m) in height it is the 15th-tallest building in the city, as well as the tallest residential building in New Mexico. The 14-story tower originally consisted of rental units but was converted to condominiums in 1979. It is located one block south of Central Avenue, just west of Downtown.

Park Plaza was constructed in 1963–4 at a cost of $2.5 million. With 144 one- and two-bedroom luxury apartments, it was the largest apartment complex in Albuquerque at the time and was described in a contemporary advertisement as "the Southwest's most beautiful and modern apartment building". Following the conversion to condos, many of the units have been renovated by their owners or combined to form larger units.

== History ==
The Park Plaza Apartments were built in 1963–4 by a partnership consisting of M.M. Hardin of Albuquerque and Dan R. Ponder and C.H. Leavell of El Paso. Ground was broken on May 14, 1963, and construction proceeded beginning with the two 165-foot (50 m) elevators and then floor by floor assembly of the steel frame. It was completed in June 1964 and cost $3 million.

From the bold, modernist design by William Burk, Jr. to the Park Avenue address, the new apartments were intended to show that "Albuquerque has arrived" and could boast sophisticated urban living on par with larger cities. When it opened, the building had 144 one- and two-bedroom luxury apartments available in seven different floorplans, each with its own balcony or lanai in the words of the promotional literature. The apartments boasted state of the art appliances, central forced air, garbage chutes, and other conveniences, and rented for $170 to $270. The ground floor also included commercial space which housed a deli and salon.

However, the project was not an immediate success. The building was slow to attract tenants, and the death of Ponder in 1965 left the developers in disarray. Ultimately the venture ended up losing over $500,000 and the two El Paso partners bowed out in 1966, selling their shares to Hardin for a nominal fee. The building did eventually fill up, and was reported as over 80% occupied in 1967. Over the years, many of the units were customized by their tenants, who were encouraged to combine units, enclose balconies, or make other changes as they saw fit. Hardin vacated his penthouse apartment in 1979 and sold the building to the Park Plaza homeowners association, which reorganized it as condominiums. By that point, the apartments had been rearranged into all manner of floorplans, the largest of which was a five-bedroom, five-bathroom unit called the Astoria. Since then, Park Plaza has continued to operate successfully as condominiums. According to a 2009 report the building had 130 units, eight of which were on the market with prices ranging from $140,000 to $265,000.

== Address ==
The address is 1331 Park Avenue, SW, yet the building is physically located on 14th Street, SW. The reason for this is that at the time of design, the developer of Park Plaza owned the property south of the building extending to the corner of the Park Avenue and 14th Street intersection and, therefore, was assigned a park Avenue address based on the proposed development which was then vacant property. Since then, the vacant property has been sold and condominiums have been developed which separate Park Plaza from Park Avenue. It was decided that an address change would create problems for the occupants currently living in Park Plaza, so the address has remained ever since. (from a letter dated 9/15/1981 signed by William H. Gooden, Assistant to the Mayor)

== See also ==
- List of tallest buildings in Albuquerque
