= Bernalillo County Metropolitan Court =

Judicial system in Bernalillo County, New Mexico

The Bernalillo County Metropolitan Court is the Judicial system of the metropolitan areas of Albuquerque, New Mexico and Bernalillo County, New Mexico, U.S. The Metropolitan Courthouse is located in Downtown Albuquerque.

== System ==
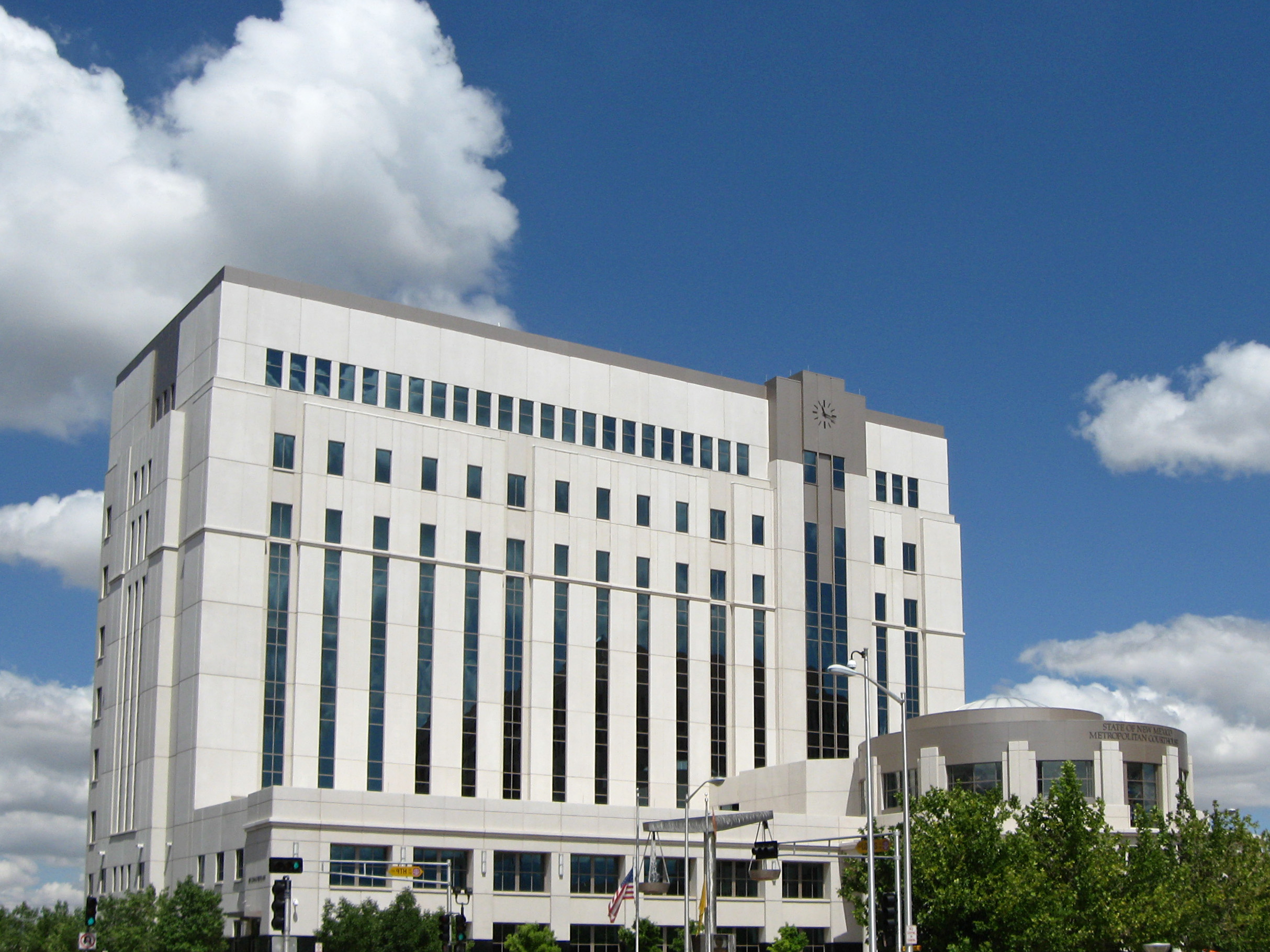
The Metropolitan Courthouse was completed in 2003

The Metropolitan Court system was established in 1980, all judges are elected by eligible voters in Bernalillo County. Judges hold 4 year terms, in 19 divisions. There are no term limits in the court system and elections are partisan.

== Judges ==
Division	Judge	Date assumed office
Division I	Asra Elliott	2022
Division II	Christine Rodriguez	January 1, 2017
Division III	Renee Torres	—
Division IV	Joshua J. Sanchez	March 15, 2021
Division V	Vacant	—
Division VI	Maria I. Dominguez	2008
Division VII	Rosemary Cosgrove-Aguilar	—
Division VIII	Jill M. Martinez	—
Division IX	Yvette K. Gonzalez	—
Division X	Brittany Maldonado Malott	2019
Division XI	Shonnetta Estrada	—
Division XII	Jason Jaramillo	2019
Division XIII	Michelle Castillo Dowler	—
Division XIV	Vidalia G. Chavez	—
Division XV	Felicia Blea-Rivera	2019
Division XVI	Claire Ann McDaniel	September 6, 2022
Division XVII	Nina Safier	March 14, 2022
Division XVIII	Rosie Lazcano Allred	2006
Division XIX	Vacant	—

=== Requirements ===
To be eligible for an office of the Metropolitan Court, a candidate must be a member of the New Mexico Bar and have practiced law in New Mexico for approximately three years.

== Metropolitan Detention Center ==
Persons being held for trial at the Metropolitan Court, or convicted of misdemeanors and serving sentences under 12 months, are incarcerated in the county jail facility, the Metropolitan Detention Center (MDC), about 10 miles west of Albuquerque, on a rural mesa. The 500,000-square-foot (46,000 m^{2}) campus employs around 500 staff, and houses over 2,000 inmates. Construction was completed in 2002, to replace the overcrowded, in-town county jail near the courthouse. It is the county’s largest public facility, and single greatest consumer of electricity, using, for example, 12,627,000 kilowatts in 2012, at a cost of $981,563. Use of solar power at the facility has increased, and as of January 2014, 20% of its power was provided by a 1-megawatt system of photovoltaic panels.
