= Albuquerque Plaza =

Skyscraper in Albuquerque, New Mexico, United States

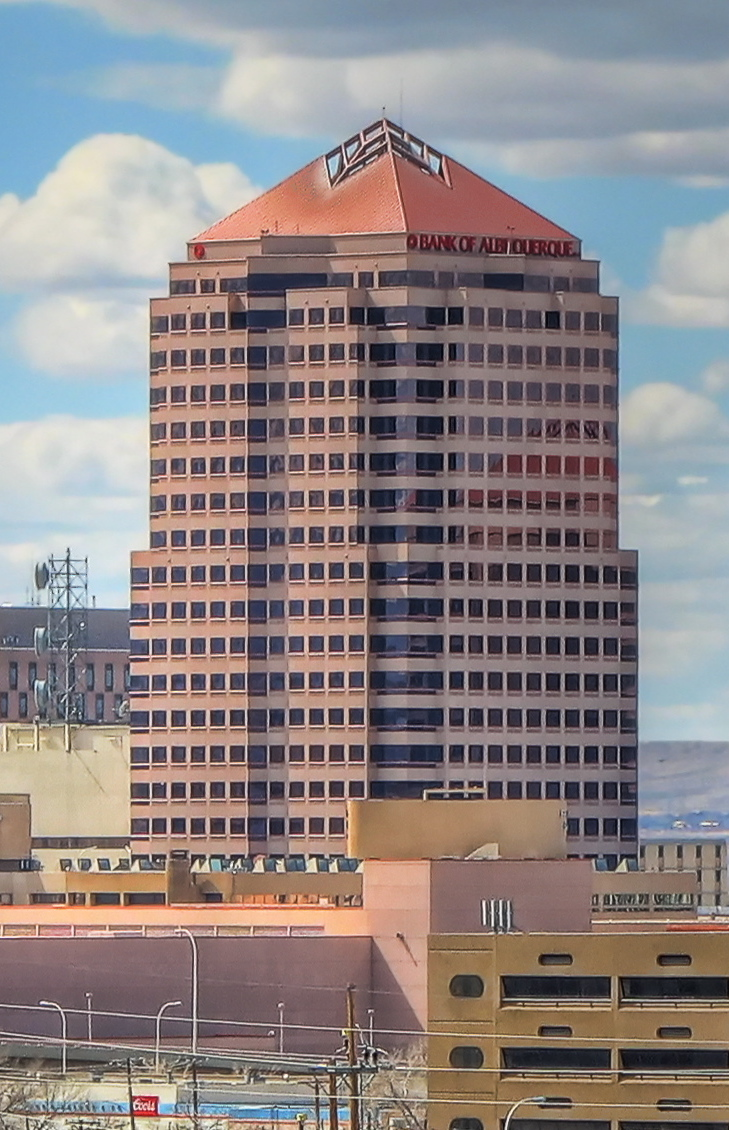
- Albuquerque Plaza in 2007.
- Alternative names: WaFd Bank Building; U.S. Eagle Plaza (former); Bank of Albuquerque Tower (former)

Record height
- Preceded by: Compass Bank Building

General information
- Type: Commercial offices
- Location: 201 Third Street NW; Albuquerque, New Mexico
- Coordinates: 35.08568°N 106.65035°W
- Completed: 1990
- Owner: Allegiance Realty Corporation
- Operator: Allegiance Realty Corporation

Height
- Roof: 351 ft (107 m)

Technical details
- Floor count: 22
- Floor area: 357,000 sq ft (33,200 m^{2}); 19,318 sq ft (1,794.7 m^{2}) (retail)
- Lifts/elevators: 8

Design and construction
- Architect: Hellmuth, Obata & Kassabaum
- Structural engineer: Brockette Davis Drake
- Main contractor: HCB Contractors

Website
- abqplaza.azurewebsites.net

Albuquerque Plaza, also known as WaFd Bank Building, is a 351-foot (107 m) high-rise building or skyscraper on the south side of Civic Plaza 201 Third Street NW, in Downtown Albuquerque, New Mexico. It is the taller of a two tower complex that contains class-A office space connected at ground level by a two-story promenade containing retail space connecting to the shorter Hyatt Regency Albuquerque hotel tower. At 22 stories, it is the tallest building in New Mexico. The hotel tower, with 20 stories, is the state's second tallest building at 256 feet (78 m). Their similar height, color, and pyramidal roofs make them the focal point of the Albuquerque skyline.

Albuquerque Plaza complex was designed by Hellmuth, Obata & Kassabaum and built in 1990.

== History ==
The Albuquerque Plaza development was built by BetaWest Properties, a commercial real estate subsidiary of US West and sister company of the Mountain Bell telephone company. The company was planning a new office tower to replace the old Mountain Bell building, which was originally built in 1953 as a Fedway department store and was notable for having New Mexico's first escalator. Concurrently, the city was planning a major expansion of the Albuquerque Convention Center and convinced BetaWest to add a luxury hotel to the proposed development. In order to secure the hotel deal, the city gave BetaWest $10 million in loans, a seven-year exemption on property taxes for the hotel, and a three-year catering concession for the convention center. Designed by HOK Architects, the planned development consisted of a 22-story office tower and 20-story hotel tower connected by a shared base. Construction began in early 1988 with the demolition of the Mountain Bell building and was completed in the summer of 1990. The total cost of the project was $100 million.

With the real estate market struggling in the early 1990s, US West began selling off many of its commercial properties. Both of the Albuquerque Plaza towers were sold to Crescent Real Estate Equities of Fort Worth in 1995 for $69 million, though US West kept its offices in the building. In 2005, the office tower was sold to a local investment group, now under the umbrella of Allegiance Realty of Charlotte, North Carolina. Meanwhile, the Hyatt was sold to an out-of-state investor. In 2013, Allegiance was able to purchase the hotel tower as well, putting both towers back under the same ownership. In 2019, Jim Long, owner of Heritage Hotels and Resorts, purchased the building from Allegiance and as of early 2020, the building is now managed by his own commercial real estate company called Heritage Real Estate Company.

== Architecture ==
Albuquerque Plaza is 351 feet (107 m) tall and has 22 stories, making it New Mexico's tallest building by both height and floor count. The tower, roughly square in plan with angular projections, is situated at the southeast corner of the block and contains 357,000 square feet (33,200 m^{2}) of class-A office space. It rises 20 stories above a two-story base which is shared with the Hyatt Regency hotel. The first floor contains a retail promenade, while the second floor houses banquet and conference rooms. The complex was designed by HOK Architects and is an example of postmodern architecture. It is constructed from reinforced concrete with pink granite trim, and both towers are capped with distinctive pyramidal roofs which contain mechanical equipment.

At the building's main entrance is a bronze sculpture by Glenna Goodacre called "Sidewalk Society" which depicts nine life-sized people engaged in various activities on the street corner. The sculpture was commissioned by the building's developer and unveiled in 1991. The racial politics of the piece have attracted some criticism, especially a scene apparently depicting a Hispanic man with a hard hat being given instructions by a white supervisor, but the overall reception of the work was mostly positive.

== Tenants and signage ==
When it opened, the building's main tenant was US West, occupying floors 4–12. Several other floors were occupied by law firms. By 1995, other major tenants included Bank of America and General Services Administration (GSA) offices. From 1998 to 2015, the building contained the headquarters of Bank of Albuquerque, a subsidiary of BOK Financial. Another large tenant was the Bureau of Indian Affairs, which left in 2007. In 2015, the building reportedly housed around 25 office tenants with about 800 employees, including several major local law firms, as well as the GSA offices.

From 1991 to 1998, the tower had a Bank of America logo to go along with the bank branch on the first floor. In 1998, the branch was one of several included in a government-mandated sale to BOK Financial, establishing the subsidiary Bank of Albuquerque. The Bank of Albuquerque logo was replaced with U.S. Eagle Federal Credit Union signage in 2015. In 2021, WaFd Bank, f.k.a. Washington Federal Bank, announced that they will be opening up an office inside Albuquerque Plaza and bought the building signage, which was installed in May 2021 and gave the building its new identity.

== Environmental impact ==
In addition to providing downtown Albuquerque with 357,000 sq ft (33,200 m^{2}) of commercial office space, the tallest building in New Mexico is also one of the state's most sustainable structures. Albuquerque Plaza, utilizes a hybrid thermal energy storage system from CALMAC. The system helps alleviate the building's dependence on the electric grid, cut carbon emissions and reduces the energy required to cool its occupants. For over 20 years, shifting the electric demand used to cool the building from on-peak to off-peak hours has saved the property over US$1.2 million on electric utility bills. In 2002, the Bank of Albuquerque Tower was awarded BOMA’s “Office Building of the Year” award, which considers energy conservation as part of its judging criteria.

== See also ==
- List of tallest buildings in Albuquerque
- List of tallest buildings by U.S. state
