= The Clyde Hotel (Albuquerque) =

Hotel in Albuquerque, New Mexico

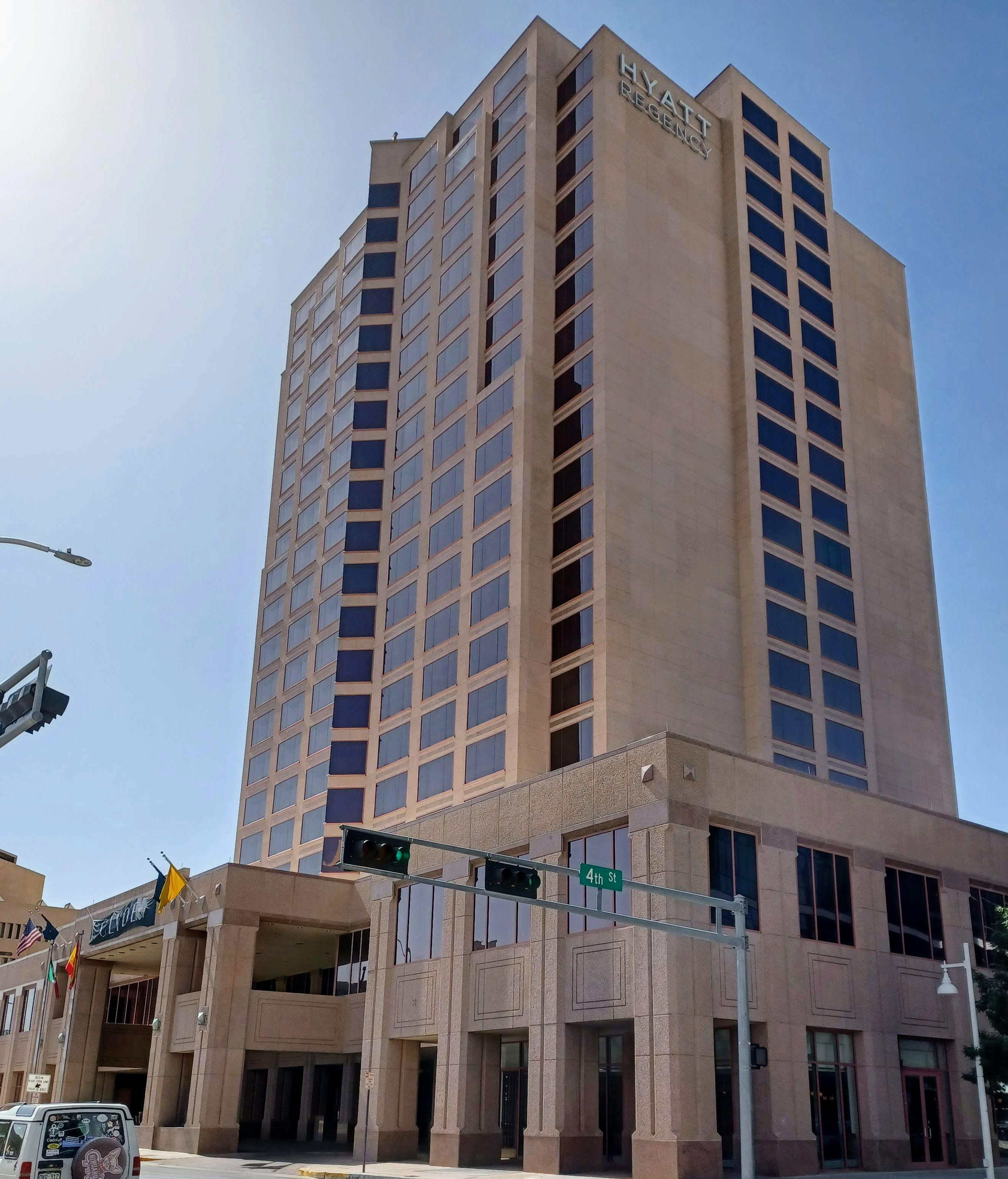
- Hyatt Regency Albuquerque in May 2022
- Interactive map of the The Clyde Hotel area
- Hotel chain: Hyatt Hotels Corporation

General information
- Location: United States, 330 Tijeras Street NW; Albuquerque, New Mexico
- Coordinates: 35.0862°N 106.6507°W
- Opening: 1990; 36 years ago
- Owner: Allegiance Realty Corporation
- Operator: Heritage Hotels and Resorts

Height
- Height: 78.03 m (256.0 ft)

Technical details
- Floor count: 20

Design and construction
- Architect: Hellmuth, Obata & Kassabaum
- Developer: HCB Contractors

Other information
- Number of rooms: 395
- Number of suites: 14
- Number of restaurants: Forque Bar and Grill

Website
- www.albuquerque.hyatt.com

The Clyde Hotel, formerly Hyatt Regency Albuquerque is a 20-story high-rise hotel located at 330 Tijeras Avenue NW in downtown Albuquerque, New Mexico, United States. The building is 78 m (256 ft) tall, making it Albuquerque's second tallest building and tallest hotel. It was built in 1990 as part of the Albuquerque Plaza mixed-use complex on the south side of Civic Plaza, which also includes the Albuquerque Plaza tower.

The Albuquerque Plaza Complex was designed by Hellmuth, Obata, & Kassabaum and was completed in 1990.

== History ==
The Hyatt Regency Albuquerque was part of the Albuquerque Plaza mixed-use development built by BetaWest Properties, a commercial real estate subsidiary of US West and sister company of the Mountain Bell telephone company. The company was planning a new office tower to replace the old Mountain Bell building, which was originally built in 1953 as a Fedway department store and was notable for having New Mexico's first escalator. Concurrently, the city was planning a major expansion of the Albuquerque Convention Center and convinced BetaWest to add a luxury hotel to the proposed development. In order to secure the hotel deal, the city gave BetaWest $10 million in loans, a seven-year exemption on property taxes for the hotel, and a three-year catering concession for the convention center. Designed by HOK Architects, the planned development consisted of a 22-story office tower and 20-story hotel tower connected by a shared base. Construction began in early 1988 with the demolition of the Mountain Bell building and was completed in the summer of 1990. The total cost of the project was $100 million.

In August 1988, it was announced that Hyatt Hotels had been chosen to operate the hotel, and the grand opening was held two years later on August 1, 1990. With the real estate market struggling in the early 1990s, US West began selling off many of its commercial properties. Both of the Albuquerque Plaza towers were sold to Crescent Real Estate Equities of Fort Worth in 1995 for $69 million. In 2005 the office tower was sold to a local investment group, now under the umbrella of Allegiance Realty of Charlotte, North Carolina. Meanwhile, the Hyatt was sold to an out-of-state investor but went into foreclosure in 2010. In 2013, Allegiance was able to purchase the hotel from Bank of America, putting both towers back under the same ownership.

=== The Clyde Hotel ===
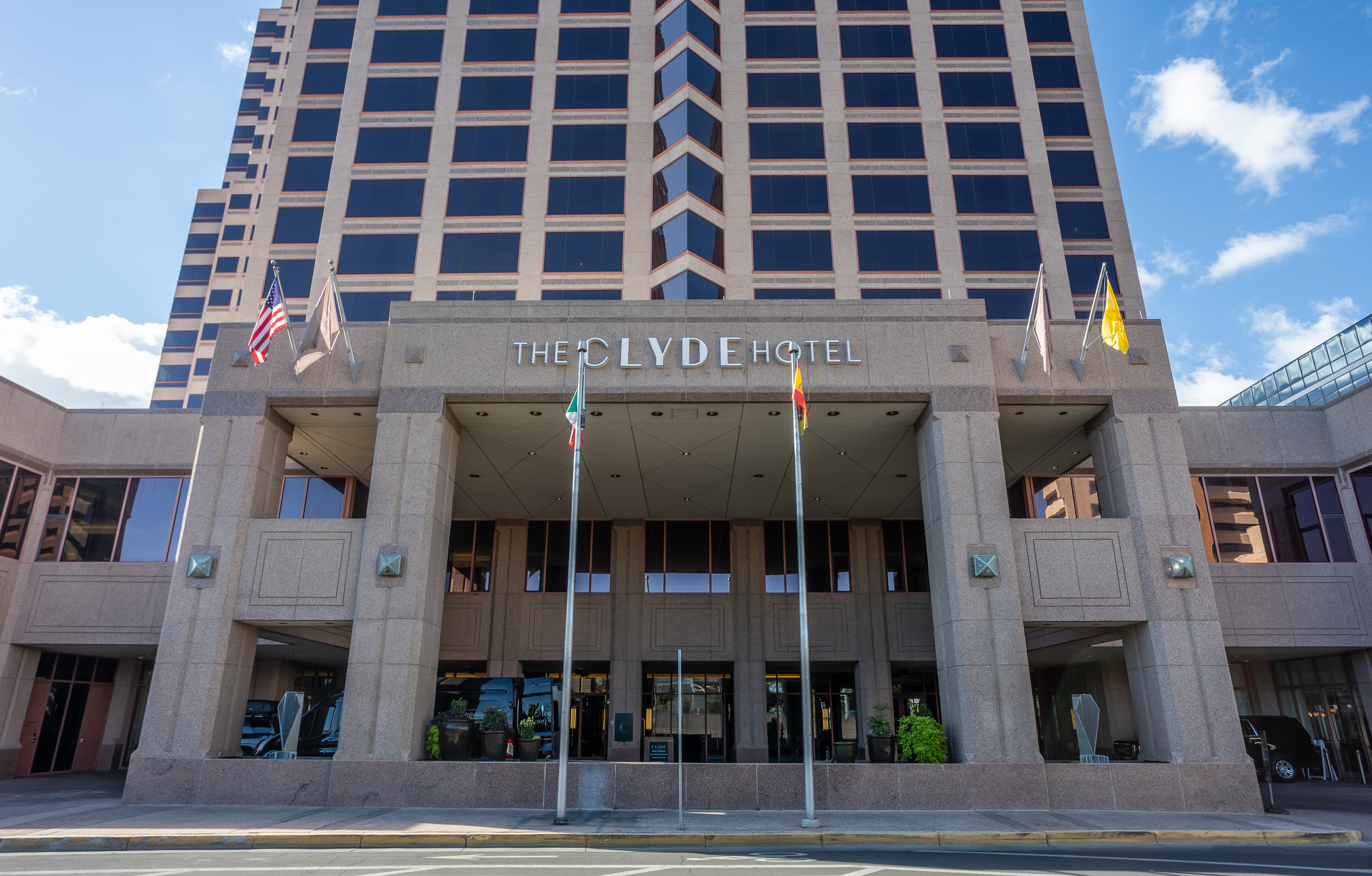
The Clyde Hotel

In 2022, the hotel was upgraded and rebranded by owner Heritage Hotels and Resorts, and renamed The Clyde Hotel. The Clyde features 392 guestrooms and suites, a rooftop pool with hot tubs, fitness center, and a wedding chapel. The new name honors New Mexico governor Clyde Tingley.

== Architecture ==
The Hyatt Regency is 256 feet (78 m) tall and has 20 stories, making it New Mexico's second tallest building by both height and floor count. The tower, roughly square in plan with angular projections, is situated at the north end of the block and originally contained 395 hotel rooms. However, after a 2022 renovation, the hotel contains 392 rooms and suites. It rises 18 stories above a two-story base which is shared with the Albuquerque Plaza office tower. The first floor contains a retail promenade, while the second floor houses banquet and conference rooms. The complex was designed by HOK Architects and is an example of postmodern architecture. It is constructed from reinforced concrete with pink granite trim, and both towers are capped with distinctive pyramidal roofs which contain mechanical equipment.

== Amenities ==
The hotel is styled with Southwestern decor and offers rooms with a mountain or city view. Carrie's, the onsite restaurant, offers fine dining, a standard cafe, and serves as the lobby lounge. Other amenities include a heated rooftop pool, hot tubs, and a 24-hour attended gym. The 24,000 ft^{2} (2,200 m^{2}) conference center contains four ballrooms, three boardrooms and 22 meeting rooms.

== See also ==
- List of tallest buildings in Albuquerque
