= 500 Marquette =

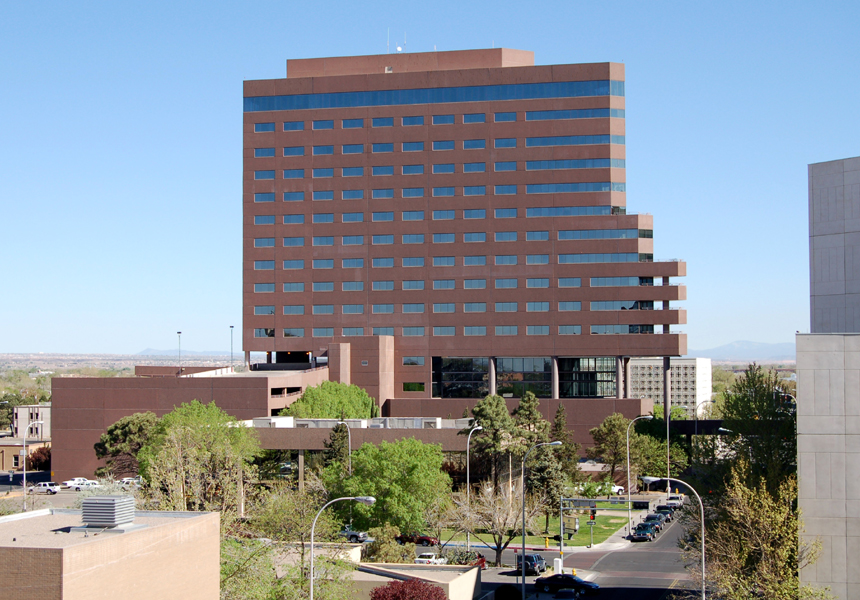
- 500 Marquette as seen from the south
- Alternative names: Albuquerque Petroleum Building; Bank of the West Building; Cavan Building

General information
- Status: Completed
- Type: Commercial offices
- Location: 500 Marquette Avenue NW; Albuquerque, New Mexico
- Coordinates: 35.087938°N 106.652757°W
- Completed: 1986

Height
- Roof: 71.7 m (235 ft)

Technical details
- Floor count: 15
- Floor area: 230,000 sq ft (21,000 m^{2})
- Lifts/elevators: 6

Design and construction
- Architect(s): Dwayne G. Lewis Architects

500 Marquette is a 15-story, 71.7 m (235 ft) high-rise office building located at 500 Marquette Avenue NW in Downtown Albuquerque, New Mexico. The building was designed by Dwayne Lewis Architects and was completed in 1986. It is the fourth tallest building in the city.

The top floor of the building was home to the Albuquerque Petroleum Club, a members-only dining club which closed in 2007. During the 1990s, 500 Marquette was owned and managed by the Chicago-based EQ Office.

== History ==
500 Marquette was built by Cavan Associates of Phoenix and opened in 1986, costing about $45 million in total. Part of the project was an attached parking garage, also intended to serve the recently completed City-County Building via a pedestrian walkway above 5th Street. The city negotiated a deal to lease about half the garage for that purpose. The office building struggled financially and went into foreclosure in 1989. Later that year it was sold to EQ Office. Bernalillo County was in negotiations to purchase the building in 2008, but ended up backing off from the deal due to the Great Recession.

== Architecture ==
500 Marquette is 235 feet (72 m) tall and has 15 stories, making it Albuquerque's fourth tallest building. Designed by Dwayne G. Lewis Architects, it consists of an 11-story trapezoidal block cantilevered over a four-story glass atrium, with a five-level parking garage extending to the south along 6th Street. The building has setbacks at the 8th and 10th floors and three corner balconies on the 5th through 7th floors. In front of the building entrance is a 12-foot (3.7 m) bronze sculpture by Allan Houser titled "The Future—Chiricahua Apache Family".

== See also ==
- List of tallest buildings in Albuquerque
