= Metropolitan Courthouse =

Courthouse in Albuquerque, New Mexico

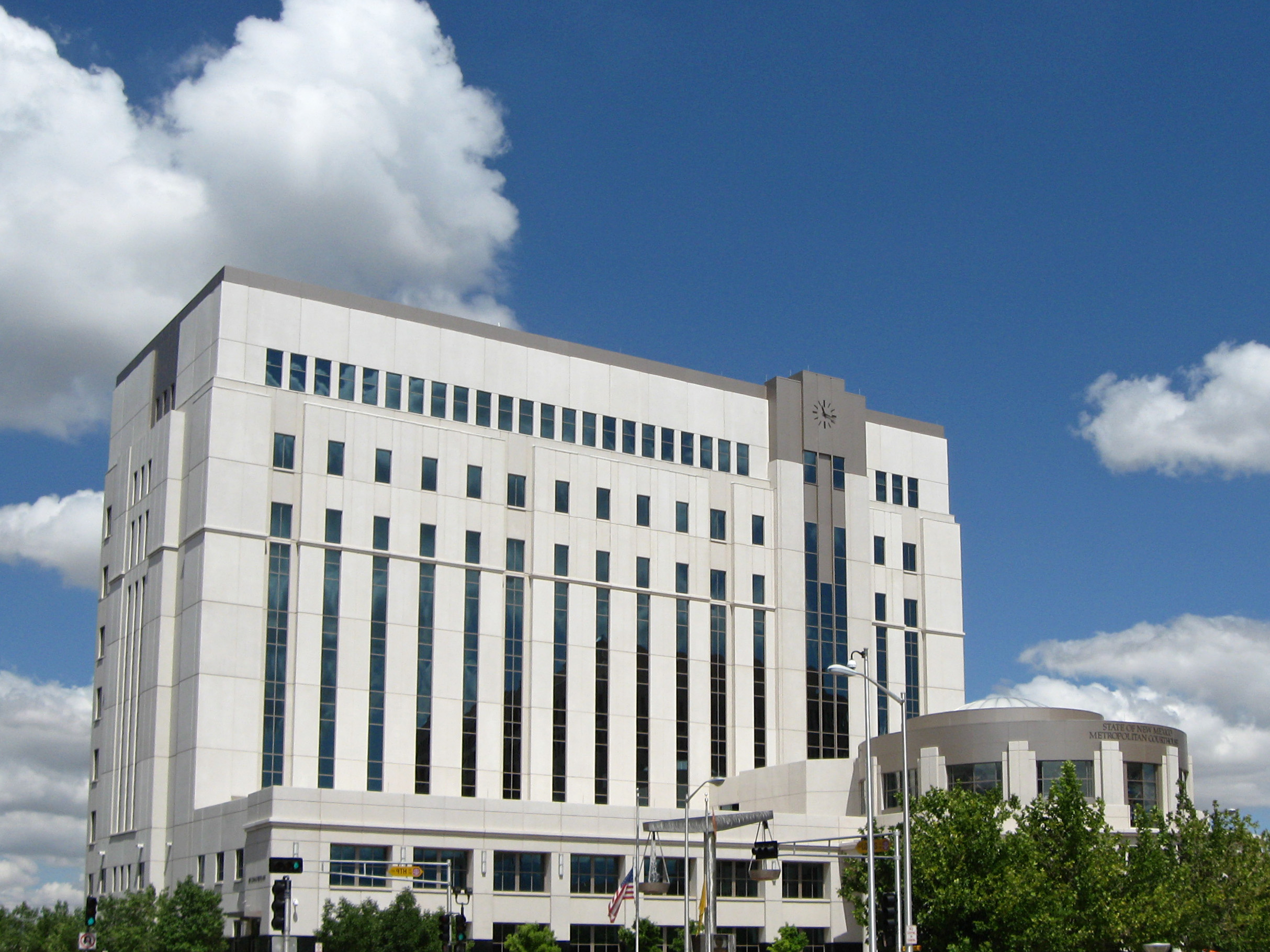
- Interactive map of the Metropolitan Courthouse area

General information
- Status: Completed
- Type: Office
- Location: 401 Lomas Blvd. NW, Albuquerque, New Mexico
- Coordinates: 35°5′30″N 106°39′04″W
- Construction started: 2001
- Completed: 2003
- Cost: $83 million

Height
- Roof: 53.3 m (175 ft)

Technical details
- Floor count: 9
- Floor area: 244,000 sq ft
- Lifts/elevators: 10

Design and construction
- Architect: DCSW Architects
- Main contractor: Bradbury Stamm Construction

The Metropolitan Courthouse is a courthouse in downtown Albuquerque, New Mexico, housing the Bernalillo County Metropolitan Court. The building is located on the northwest corner of 4th Street and Lomas Boulevard in an area known as the Courthouse District. The courthouse rises 175 feet (53 m) and has nine stories. Designed by DCSW Architects in a contemporary Art Deco style, it features a three-story rotunda finished with granite, marble, and travertine and a 36-foot (11 m) sculpture of the scales of justice.

Ground was broken on the project in May 2001 and the building was topped out the following June. The courthouse opened for business on January 20, 2004, replacing the old Metro Courthouse at 4th and Roma.

From 2005 to 2009, the Metro Courthouse was at the center of a high-profile fraud investigation, during which allegations emerged that a group of conspirators had siphoned off $4.2 million from the courthouse construction project in a scheme described by the Albuquerque Journal as "breathtaking in scope and star power." Eight people were eventually named as defendants in the case, including the former president pro tempore of the New Mexico State Senate and a former mayor of Albuquerque. The investigation ended with six of the accused pleading guilty to conspiracy and mail fraud, while the other two pleaded guilty to misprision of felony.

== See also ==
- List of tallest buildings in Albuquerque
