= Pete V. Domenici United States Courthouse =

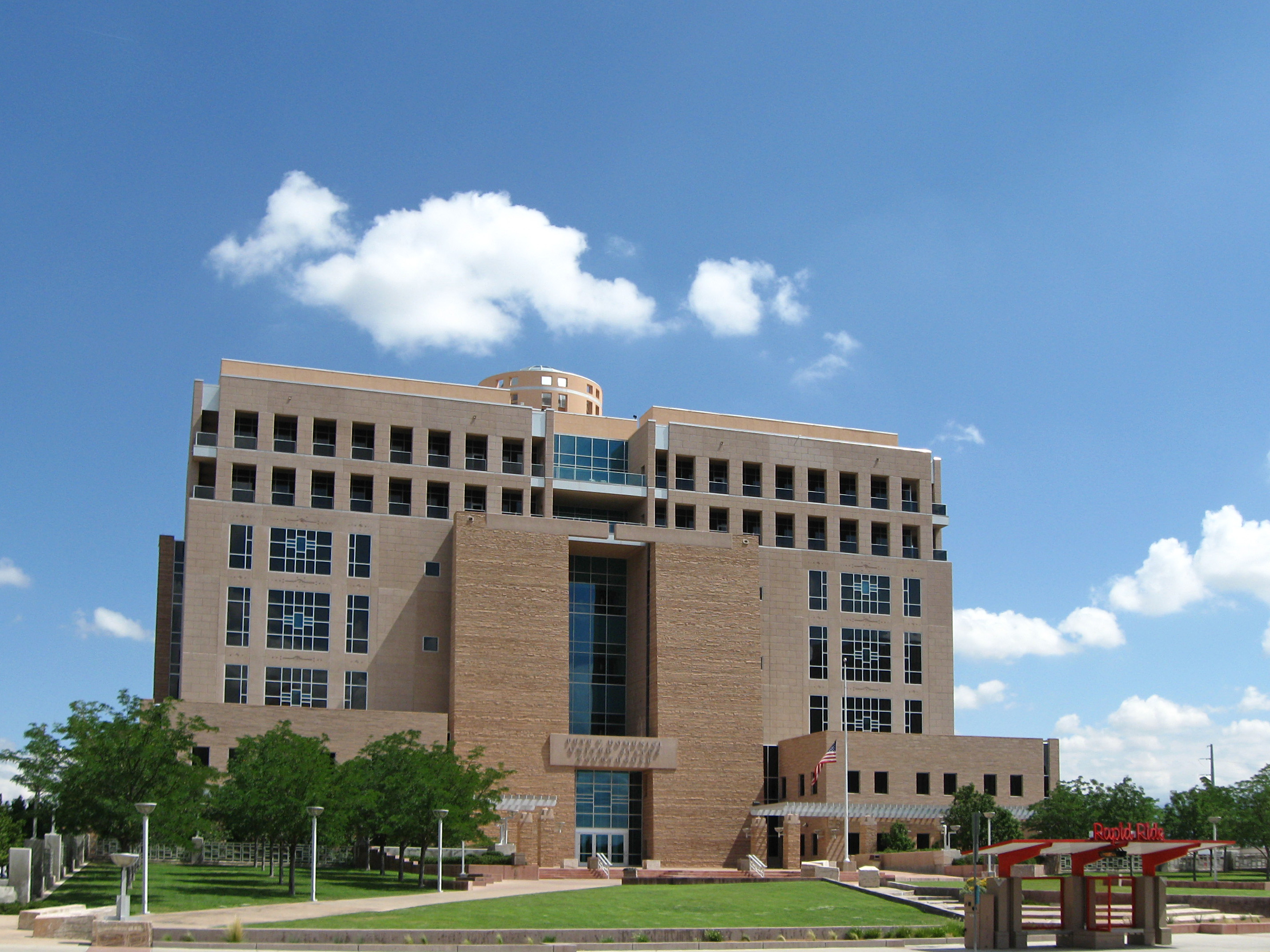
- The courthouse as seen from the south, on Lomas Blvd
- Interactive map of the Pete V. Domenici United States Courthouse area

General information
- Type: Courthouse
- Location: 333 Lomas Blvd. NW; Albuquerque, New Mexico
- Coordinates: 35.091681°N 106.649501°W
- Completed: 1998
- Cost: $41 million

Height
- Roof: 176 ft (54 m)

Technical details
- Floor count: 7
- Floor area: 311,000 square feet (28,900 m^{2})
- Lifts/elevators: 10

Design and construction
- Architect: Flatow Moore Shaffer McCabe
- Main contractor: Centex Construction

The Pete V. Domenici United States Courthouse is a federal courthouse located in downtown Albuquerque, New Mexico. The building was completed in 1998 and named in honor of Senator Pete Domenici at a ceremony in 2004. Since its completion it has been joined at the intersection of Fourth and Lomas by two additional courthouses, the Bernalillo County Courthouse on the southwest corner and the Metropolitan Courthouse on the northwest corner. The seven-story courthouse is 176 feet (54 m) tall, placing it tenth on the list of Albuquerque's tallest buildings.

Planning for the courthouse began in 1993 and after some initial wrangling the city chose a two-block site north of Lomas between Third and Fourth streets. This plan was immediately embroiled in controversy because one of the blocks was the site of McClellan Park, which dated from 1919 and had housed New Mexico's Madonna of the Trail monument since 1928. Though McClellan Park had deteriorated badly by the 1990s, opponents of the courthouse maintained that the park was a historic landmark worthy of preservation. On the other hand, supporters of the courthouse, led by Mayor Martin Chavez, considered the park an eyesore that could be put to a better use as a site for new development. Eventually the city won out, and McClellan Park was bulldozed in 1996 as construction began on the courthouse. The Madonna of the Trail monument was moved to the northwest corner of the courthouse site, where it remains.
