= New Mexico Bank & Trust Building =

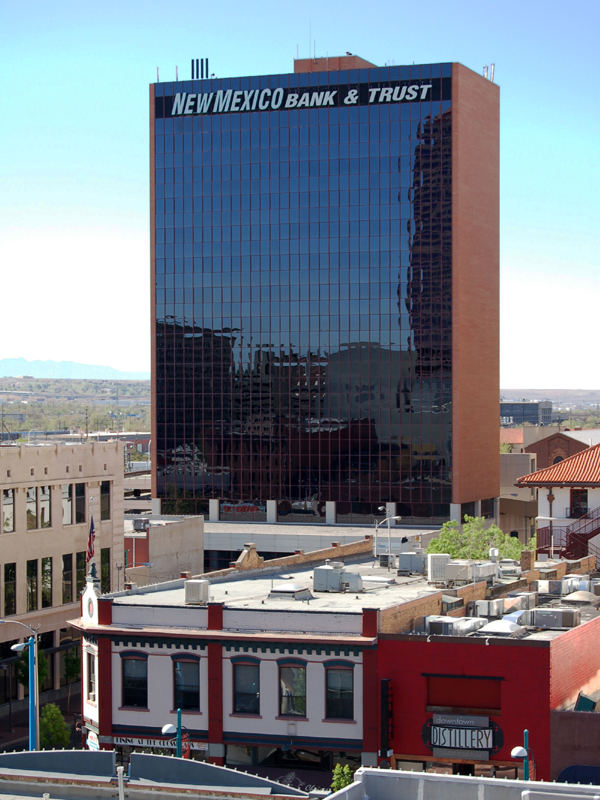
- Interactive map of the New Mexico Bank & Trust Building area
- Alternative names: Bank of New Mexico Building; First Interstate Bank Building; Gold Building

Record height
- Preceded by: Simms Building
- Surpassed by: Bank of the West Tower

General information
- Status: Completed
- Type: Commercial offices
- Architectural style: Modernism
- Location: 320 Gold Avenue SW; Albuquerque, New Mexico
- Coordinates: 35.083182°N 106.651452°W
- Construction started: 1959
- Completed: 1961
- Cost: $4 million

Height
- Roof: 62 m (203 ft)

Technical details
- Floor count: 14
- Floor area: 108,000 sq ft (10,000 m^{2})

Design and construction
- Architect: W.C. Kruger & Associates
- Developer: Bank Reality Company
- Main contractor: George A. Fuller Construction Company

The New Mexico Bank & Trust Building is a 14-story, 62 m (203 ft) office skyscraper on Gold Avenue in downtown Albuquerque, New Mexico. It is the sixth-tallest building in the city. When completed in 1961, it surpassed the Simms Building to become the tallest building in the state, and was itself surpassed by the Bank of the West Tower two years later.

The building's main 12-story block has black tinted glass curtain walls on the north and south sides, while the windowless east and west sides and the protruding elevator shaft on the south side are faced with brick. It sits atop a larger one-story base, with a recessed second story in between. The architect was Willard C. Kruger.

== History ==
The Bank of New Mexico Building, as it was originally known, was built in 1959–1961 by the Bank Realty Company, which had Winthrop Rockefeller as one of its main partners. Rockefeller was also one of the developers of Winrock Center and would later be elected governor of Arkansas. Built on a five-lot parcel at 4th Street and Gold Avenue, the building replaced several older structures including Wright's Trading Post. The general contractor was the George A. Fuller Construction Company of New York. It was dedicated on January 16, 1961, in a ceremony featuring Native American dancers and speeches by Rockefeller, dressed in a sombrero for the occasion, and Chairman of the City Commission Maurice Sanchez. The project's total cost was about $4 million.

Designed by local architect Willard C. Kruger, the 14-story building surpassed the Simms Building across the street to become the tallest in New Mexico. The 14th floor housed the private Petroleum Club, while the namesake Bank of New Mexico had its headquarters on the ground floor. In 1981, the bank's holding company re-branded its banks with the First Interstate Bank name, and the building was renamed accordingly. The building was given a $5 million remodeling in 1986, which included major mechanical work as well as replacing the original curtain walls with the current black tinted glass. Kruger & Associates were the architects for the remodeling as well, though Kruger himself had died in 1984.

The bank headquarters eventually ended up in the hands of Norwest Bank, which moved out in 1994 as it already had headquarters nearby. In 1996, The Bank of New Mexico (unrelated to the original bank) moved in and put its name on the building, but this bank was also acquired by Norwest two years later. Since the early 2000s it has been the headquarters of New Mexico Bank & Trust, a division of HTLF Bank. The building is visible in a scene of Better Call Saul.

== Architecture ==
The New Mexico Bank & Trust Building is 203 feet (62 m) tall and has 14 above-ground floors plus a mechanical penthouse. It was designed by Willard C. Kruger, who was also the architect of the New Mexico State Capitol among other works. Stylistically, it fits into the International Style and is quite similar in appearance to the older Simms Building across the street. Like the Simms Building, it has curtain walls on the north and south sides, windowless brick on the east and west sides, a recessed second story exposing the structural columns, and a larger one-story base. The curtain walls were originally clear glass alternating with opaque turquoise-colored panels, but this was replaced by black tinted glass set in a coral-colored frame during the 1986 remodeling. On the south side, the building has a protruding, brick-faced elevator shaft.

== See also ==
- List of tallest buildings in Albuquerque
