= Downtown Albuquerque =

- Neighborhood of Albuquerque
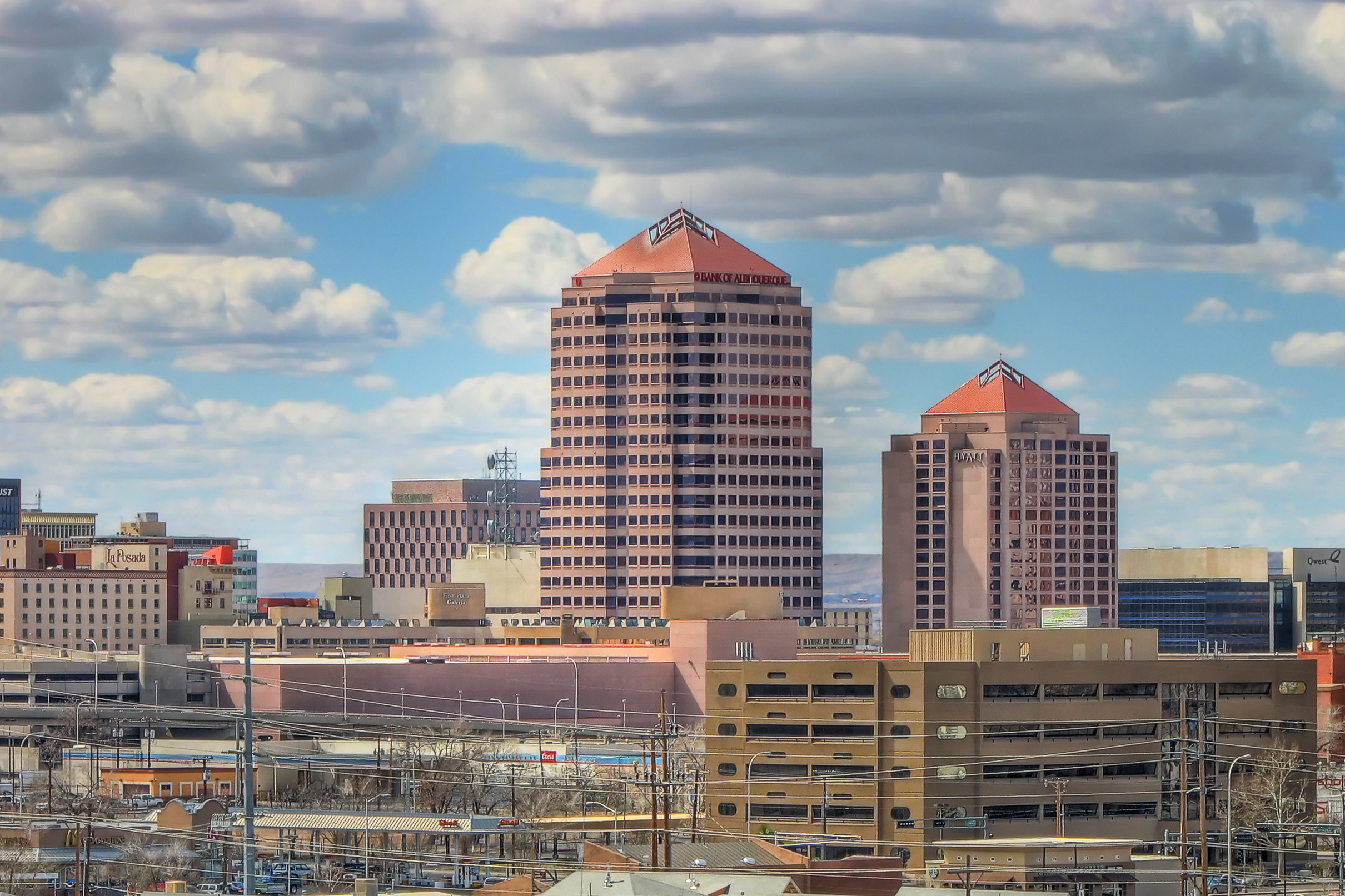
- Downtown Albuquerque
- Interactive map of Downtown Albuquerque
- Coordinates: 35.084°N 106.65°W

Government
  - City Council: Isaac Benton
  - State House: Javier Martínez (D)
  - State Senate: Jerry Ortiz y Pino (D)
  - U.S. House: Melanie Stansbury (D)

Area
  - Total: 0.40 sq mi (1.0 km^{2})

Population (2010)
  - Total: 1,237
  - Density: 3,092.5/sq mi (1,194.0/km^{2})
- ZIP Code: 87102
- Area code: 505

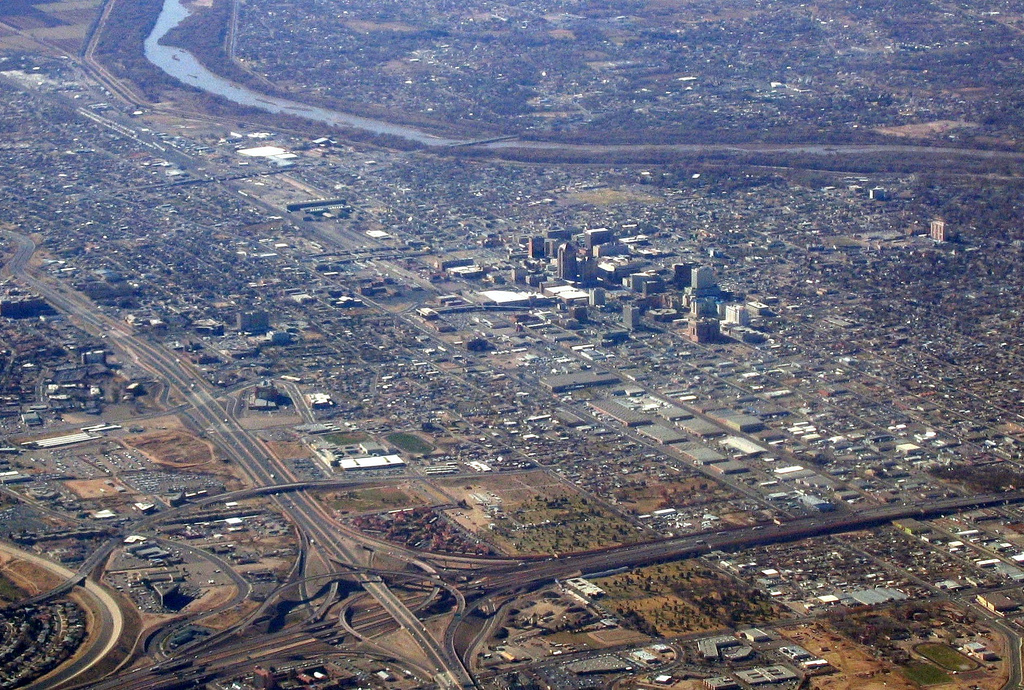
Downtown Albuquerque aerial

Downtown Albuquerque is the central business district of Albuquerque, New Mexico, United States. It is where a significant number of the city's highrise buildings are located, and is the center of government and business for the Greater Albuquerque metropolitan region.

Downtown is roughly defined as the central area bordered by Marble Avenue to the North, Coal Avenue to the South, Seventh and Tenth Streets to the West, and the Amtrak and New Mexico Rail Runner Express railroad tracks to the East. The area on the east side of the railroad tracks is known as East Downtown or EDo. The downtown area can be easily accessed by several freeway exits from Interstate 25 and Interstate 40, which border the adjacent neighborhoods of EDo and Wells Park, respectively.

== Geography ==
Downtown Albuquerque is laid out in a standard grid pattern, with numbered north–south streets and named east–west avenues. Central Avenue (originally known as Railroad Avenue) is the main east–west thoroughfare through the center of Downtown, while Lomas Boulevard (originally New York Avenue) is a major east–west arterial through the north part of Downtown. Lead and Coal Avenues are significant one-way east–west thoroughfares through the south side of Downtown.

The streets start with First Street just west of the railroad tracks and increase in number moving westward. Fourth Street was originally the main north–south thoroughfare through Downtown but today it is discontinuous, interrupted by Civic Plaza. The two block stretch between Central and Civic Plaza was once converted into a pedestrian mall, but was reverted to a vehicular roadway in late 2014. Since these developments took place Second Street has been the main north–south street through downtown.

Fourth Street through downtown Albuquerque was part of U.S. Route 66 prior to the route's 1937 realignment. Afterwards, Route 66 ran along Central Avenue until its decommissioning.

== Districts ==
Downtown Albuquerque is divided into six official districts, which are identified by a unified system of signage and icons.

=== Courthouse District ===
Located on the north side of downtown, this district is bounded by Marble Avenue, Roma Avenue, Second Street, and Seventh Street. It is named for the three major courthouses located at the intersection of Fourth and Lomas: Pete V. Domenici United States Courthouse, Bernalillo County Courthouse, and the Bernalillo County Metropolitan Courthouse.

=== Warehouse District ===
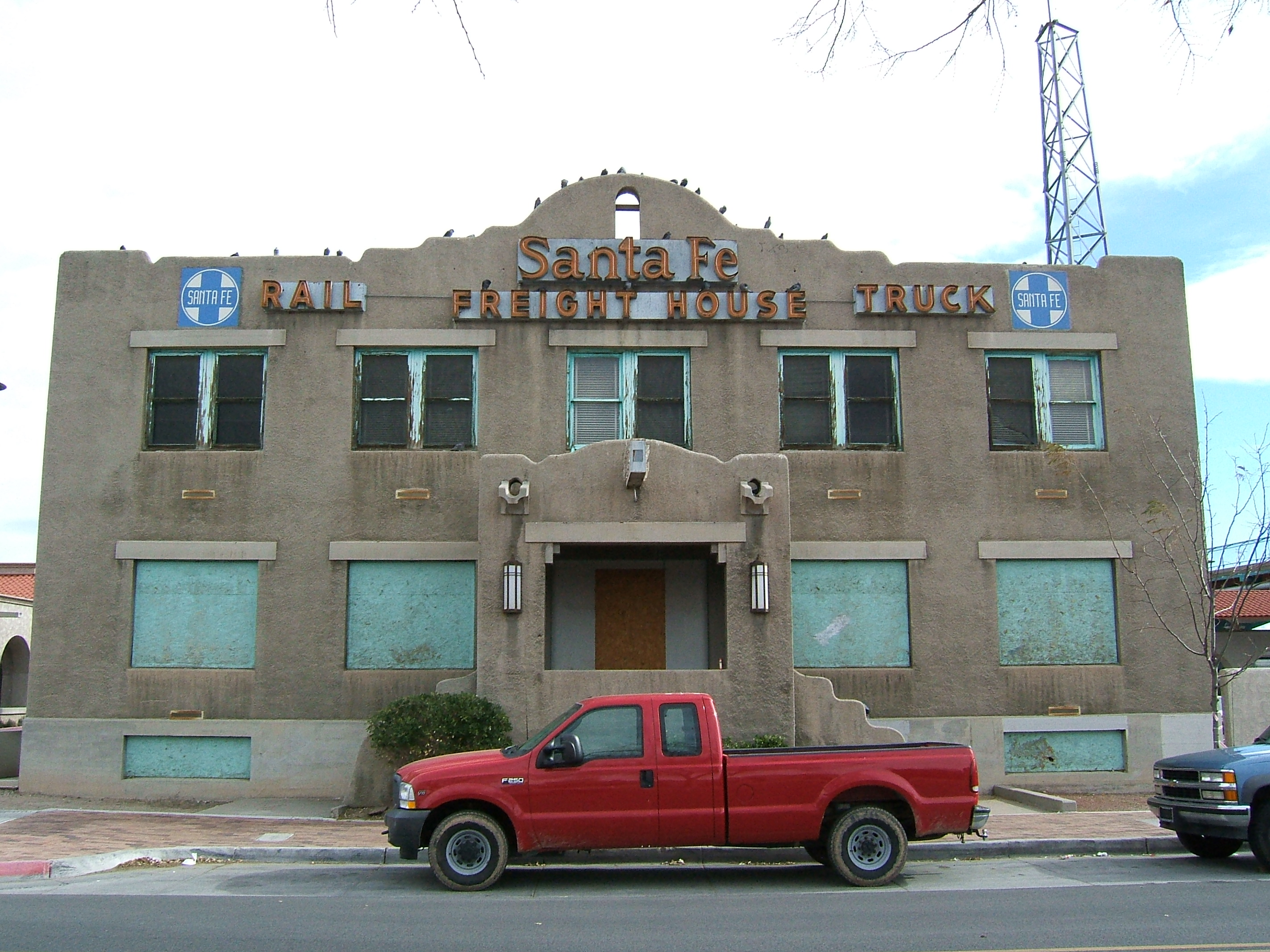
Old Santa Fe Railroad Freight House in 2007, Transportation Center District.

On the north side of downtown along the railroad tracks, the Warehouse District includes the area between Second and the railroad tracks, north of the Convention Center to Slate Avenue. As its name implies, this area contains mostly warehouses from the railroad era.

=== Plaza District ===
The Plaza District is the central area of downtown, bounded by Roma, Copper, Seventh, and the railroad tracks. It is centered on Civic Plaza and includes many of Albuquerque's large office and government buildings including the Albuquerque City-County Building, the Convention Center, Albuquerque Plaza, the Compass Bank Building, and the Albuquerque Petroleum Building. The Main Library of the Albuquerque/Bernalillo County Library System is also located in this district.

=== Arts and Entertainment District ===
This district is centered along Central Avenue and Gold Avenue west of First Street. It contains most of downtown Albuquerque's historic buildings as well as most of its shopping, dining, and nightlife destinations. Notable landmarks in this district include the KiMo Theater, Occidental Life Building, First National Bank Building, and Sunshine Building. There is a small concentration of government and office buildings on Gold Avenue which includes the Dennis Chavez Federal Building, Gold Building, and Simms Building. Amy Biehl High School is also located in this district.

=== Transportation Center District ===
This is the smallest district, encompassing the area south of Central Avenue and east of First Street. Most of the district is occupied by Alvarado Transportation Center.

=== Casa District ===
The southernmost part of downtown, the Casa District includes the area between Gold and Coal Avenue, extending all the way west to Tenth Street. This is a primarily residential district, with a large number of loft apartment buildings. Alvarado Square, the location of the PNM Building and the headquarters of Bernalillo County, is also located in the Casa District.

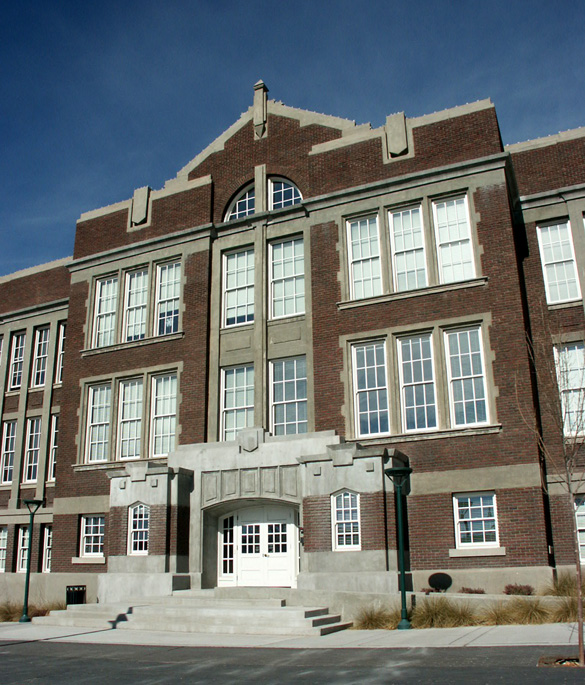
Old Albuquerque High School

== Buildings ==
=== Tallest buildings ===
Downtown Albuquerque contains most of the city's highrise buildings, including the four tallest. The tallest downtown buildings are listed below:

Rank	Name	Height	Floors
1	Albuquerque Plaza	351 feet (107 m)	22
2	Hyatt Regency Albuquerque	256 feet (78 m)	21
3	Compass Bank Building	238 feet (73 m)	18
4	500 Marquette	235 feet (72 m)	15
5	New Mexico Bank & Trust Building	203 feet (62 m)	14

=== Historic landmarks ===
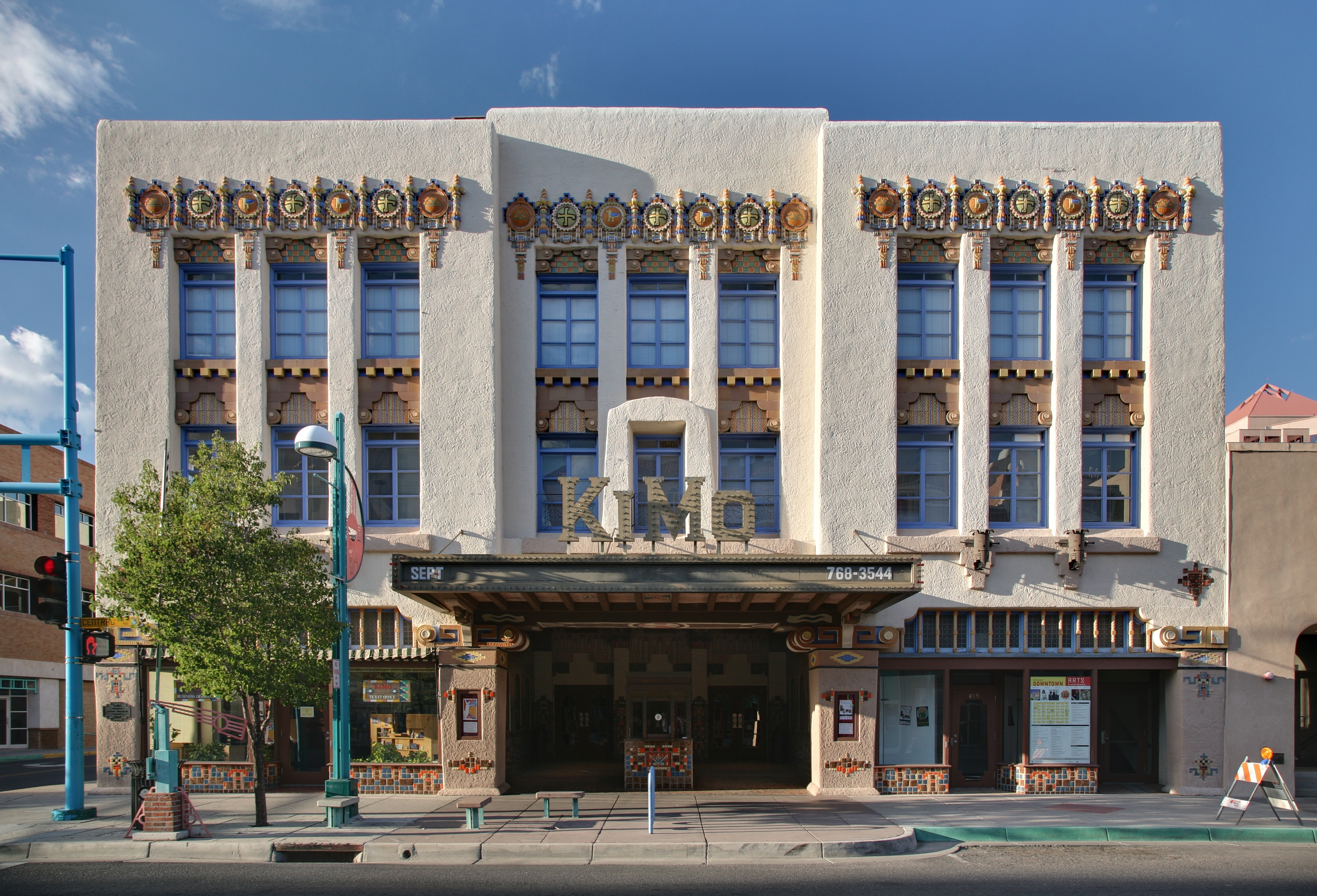
KiMo Theater

There are a number of buildings in downtown that are on the National Register of Historic Places:

- KiMo Theater, one of the city's best-known landmarks
- The old Federal Building and U.S. Courthouse
- First National Bank Building
- Hotel Andaluz
- Occidental Life Building
- Old Post Office
- Simms Building
- Southwestern Brewery and Ice Company
- Sunshine Building

== Transportation ==
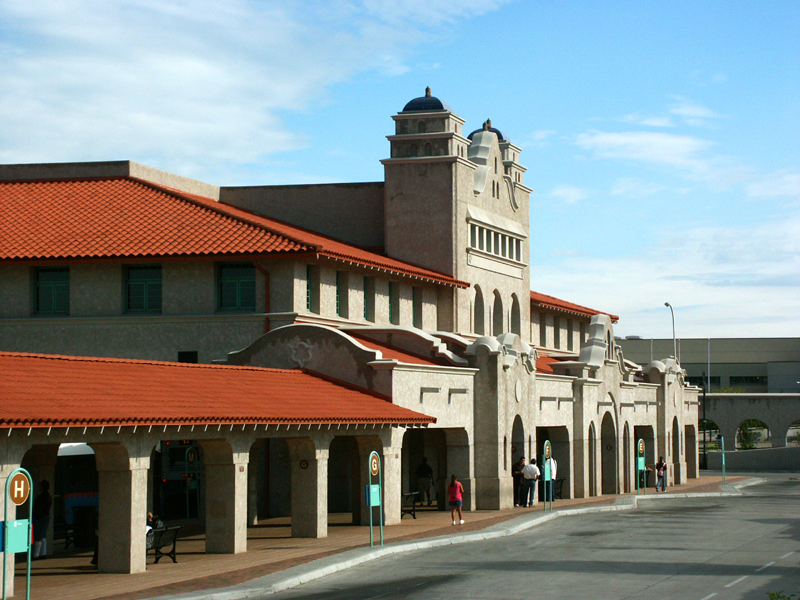
Alvarado Transportation Center

Downtown is the center of public transit in the city, and is served by a network of ABQ RIDE routes including local routes, both the Red and Blue Albuquerque Rapid Transit BRT routes, and the Blue ARTx route, most of which include stops at the Alvarado Transportation Center. ABQ RIDE operated a free circulator bus service in the downtown area named Downtown Get Around (or "D-Ride" for short), which was replaced by various local routes on May 12, 2018, such as 12th Street/Rio Grande (routes #36 and #37) and Menaul (route #8). All inbound routes to the Alvarado Transportation Center, except route #66 and ART and ARTx routes, have a fare-free zone downtown.

In addition to local bus transit, the Alvarado Transportation Center also incorporates Amtrak and Greyhound bus facilities, as well as a stop on the New Mexico Rail Runner Express commuter rail line. The Rail Runner Express provides commuter service seven days a week along a 96.5-mile corridor that runs through multiple counties in New Mexico through 13 stations.

EDo is served by several ABQ Ride routes, both ART routes, and is adjacent to the Alvarado Transportation Center.
