= First National Bank Building (Albuquerque) =

- U.S. National Register of Historic Places
- NM State Register of Cultural Properties
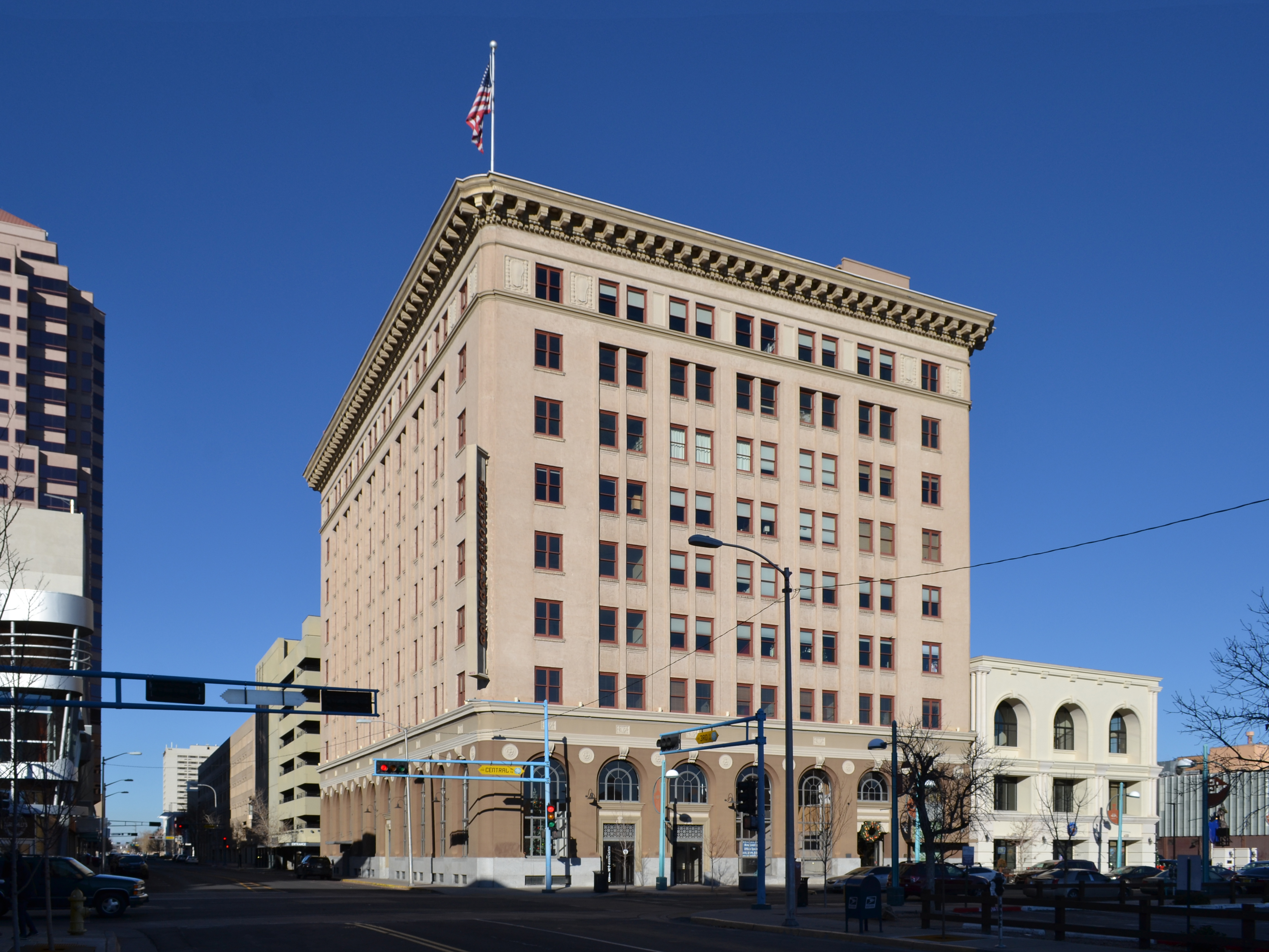
- The building in 2018

- Location within New Mexico Location within the United States
- Location: 217-233 Central Ave. NW; Albuquerque, New Mexico
- Built: 1923
- Architect: Henry Charles Trost
- NRHP reference No.: 79003127
- NMSRCP No.: 660

Significant dates
- Added to NRHP: February 2, 1979
- Designated NMSRCP: July 28, 1978

The First National Bank Building is a historic building in downtown Albuquerque, New Mexico, and the former headquarters of the First National Bank of Albuquerque. The nine-story building was completed in 1923 and was considered the city's first skyscraper with an overall height of 141 feet (43 m). It remained the tallest building in the city until 1954, when it was surpassed by the Simms Building.

The building was designed by Henry C. Trost of the Trost & Trost firm, who was also responsible for several other nearby structures including the Rosenwald Building, Occidental Life Building, and Sunshine Building. It was listed on the New Mexico State Register of Cultural Properties in 1978 and the National Register of Historic Places in 1979.

== History ==
The First National Bank Building was built in 1922–23, replacing an older building at Second and Gold Streets as the headquarters of the First National Bank. The bank commissioned the El Paso firm of Trost & Trost to design the building, with Henry C. Trost as the lead architect. The bank's president John M. Raynolds wrote in a letter that Trost "seemed to catch our ideas of what kind of a building we wanted and what kind of a banking room we wanted, and put them on paper immediately. ...We are especially pleased with the design Mr. Trost made of the exterior of the building and believe that it requires an artist like Mr. Trost to give a building distinction and individuality."

At 141 feet (43 m), the nine-story building was the tallest in the city and was often referred to as Albuquerque's first skyscraper. An Albuquerque Journal writer described the view from the roof of the building in 1923:

From this vantage point a glorious panorama greets the eye of the beholder and stirs the imagination... Huddling about the building, which dwarfs most of the surrounding works of man, lies the city. The business streets, lined with motor cars and alive with traffic blend into the tree lined residential districts, where the shady houses merge gradually into the sporadic development on the fringe of the city. The view obtained of the mountains is indescribably beautiful, especially looking east, beyond the university, and turning round from this view the three lonely looking extinct volcanoes beyond the Rio Grande meet the eye with exceptional distinctness.

In addition to the bank, the building housed offices for many of the city's most prominent doctors, lawyers, and other professionals. Most of the third floor was occupied by the Lovelace Clinic until it moved to its own building in 1950. The First National Bank Building remained the tallest building in Albuquerque until the 180-foot (55 m) Simms Building was completed in 1954. First National Bank sold the building after moving its headquarters to First Plaza in 1975, but reacquired it in 1990 and moved some of its departments back in. First National's successor First Security Bank owned the building until 1999, when it was purchased by a private developer with the intent to convert it into a luxury hotel. Plans later changed, and the building was instead remodeled into a high-end condominium project called The Banque Lofts, which opened in 2006.

== Architecture ==
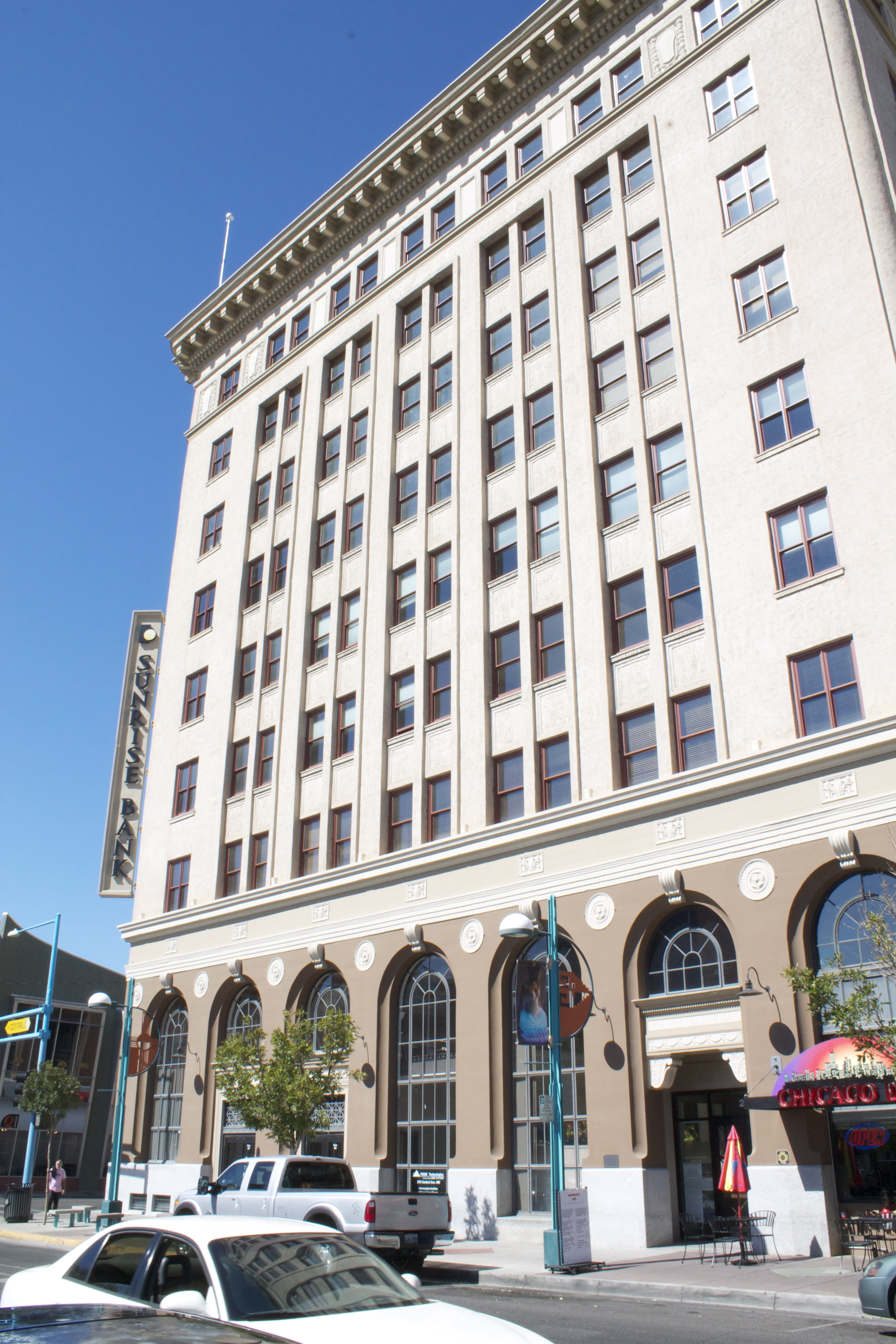
The building's Central Ave. elevation

The First National Bank Building is an L-shaped structure occupying the northeast corner of 3rd Street and Central Avenue. Architecturally, it is divided into three sections: a two-story base, a six-story main block, and a one-story crown. The base contains the original double-height banking hall and a mezzanine and is distinguished by a row of 22-foot (6.7 m) high arched windows extending all the way around the building, even into the alley. It is further ornamented with scrolls, rosettes, medallions, and moldings. The ninth floor is set off with a string course and decorated with corner medallions and a heavy cornice.

The building has a concrete frame and includes a full basement and two mechanical floors. The banking lobby has a high coffered ceiling supported by two rows of octagonal columns and continues the arched window pattern on all four sides. On the blind walls, the arches are filled with mirrors to increase the apparent size of the room. A mezzanine was added on the north side in the 1940s. The lobby area was renovated into office space in 2017 but still includes most of the original details including the bank vault.
