= Old Main Library (Albuquerque, New Mexico) =

- U.S. National Register of Historic Places
- U.S. Historic district – Contributing property
- NM State Register of Cultural Properties
- Albuquerque Historic Landmark
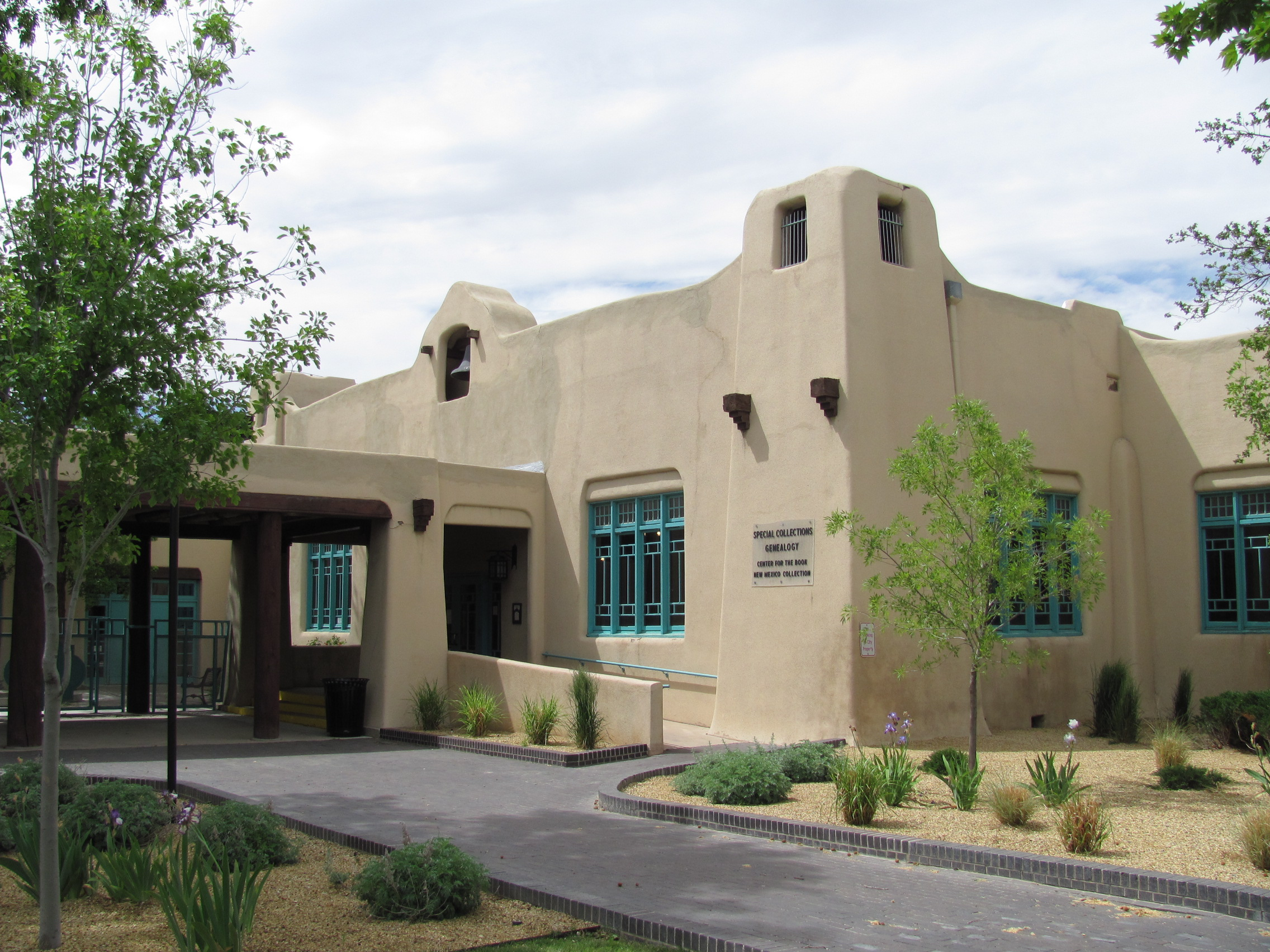
- The library in 2010

- Location within New Mexico Location within the United States
- Location: 423 Central Ave. NE; Albuquerque, New Mexico
- Coordinates: 35°5′2″N 106°38′33″W
- Built: 1925
- Architect: Arthur Rossiter
- Architectural style: Pueblo Revival
- Part of: Huning Highlands Historic District (ID78001804)
- NRHP reference No.: 100010754
- NMSRCP No.: 395

Significant dates
- Added to NRHP: August 19, 2024
- Designated CP: November 17, 1978
- Designated NMSRCP: July 25, 1975
- Designated ALBHL: October 1, 1979

The Old Main Library is a historic building in the Huning Highlands neighborhood of Albuquerque, New Mexico, originally built in 1925 as the main facility of the Albuquerque Public Library. Since the opening of the current Main Library in 1975, it has served as the library system's Special Collections branch, housing historical and genealogical research materials. Designed by Arthur Rossiter with interior decorations by Gustave Baumann, the building is a notable example of Pueblo Revival architecture. It was added to the New Mexico State Register of Cultural Properties in 1975 and is also an Albuquerque Historic Landmark. It was individually listed on the National Register in 2024.

== History ==
The Albuquerque Public Library opened in 1901, operating out of a former school building called Perkins Hall which was donated to the city by Joshua and Sarah Raynolds. By the 1920s, the building was considered to be obsolete and a campaign to build a new library was spearheaded by a coalition of local women's groups called the Women's Library Association. One of the project leaders was the well known writer Erna Fergusson. In 1923, voters approved a bond issue for construction of the new library, and the City Commission put the project up for bid the following year. In accordance with the wishes of the WLA, the building was to be of a "typically southwestern" architectural style.

The new library was built on the site of Perkins Hall using salvaged brick from the old building. The Pueblo Revival style building was designed by Arthur Rossiter, with interior decorations by Santa Fe artist Gustave Baumann, and opened to the public on March 23, 1925. Further additions were made in 1947 and 1951. In 1975, a new Main Library was built in Downtown Albuquerque, and the old building was re-purposed to house the library's Special Collections, encompassing local history and genealogy research materials. The interior underwent restoration projects in 1978 and again in 2010–12, and the building was named a city historic landmark in 1979.

== Architecture ==
The Old Main Library is a one-story Pueblo Revival style building with battered, stuccoed walls, exposed vigas, and buttressed corners. The main facade features square corner towers and a curved parapet with a bell. The turquoise-painted, Prairie style windows are another notable feature. The original 1925 building has been partly obscured by later additions, though these were designed to harmonize with the existing architecture. The interior of the original portion of the library features a single large room with low partitions. Interior details include heavy wooden columns and beams, two corner fireplaces, and murals by Gustave Baumann.
