= La Glorieta =

Historic house in New Mexico, United States

- U.S. National Register of Historic Places
- NM State Register of Cultural Properties
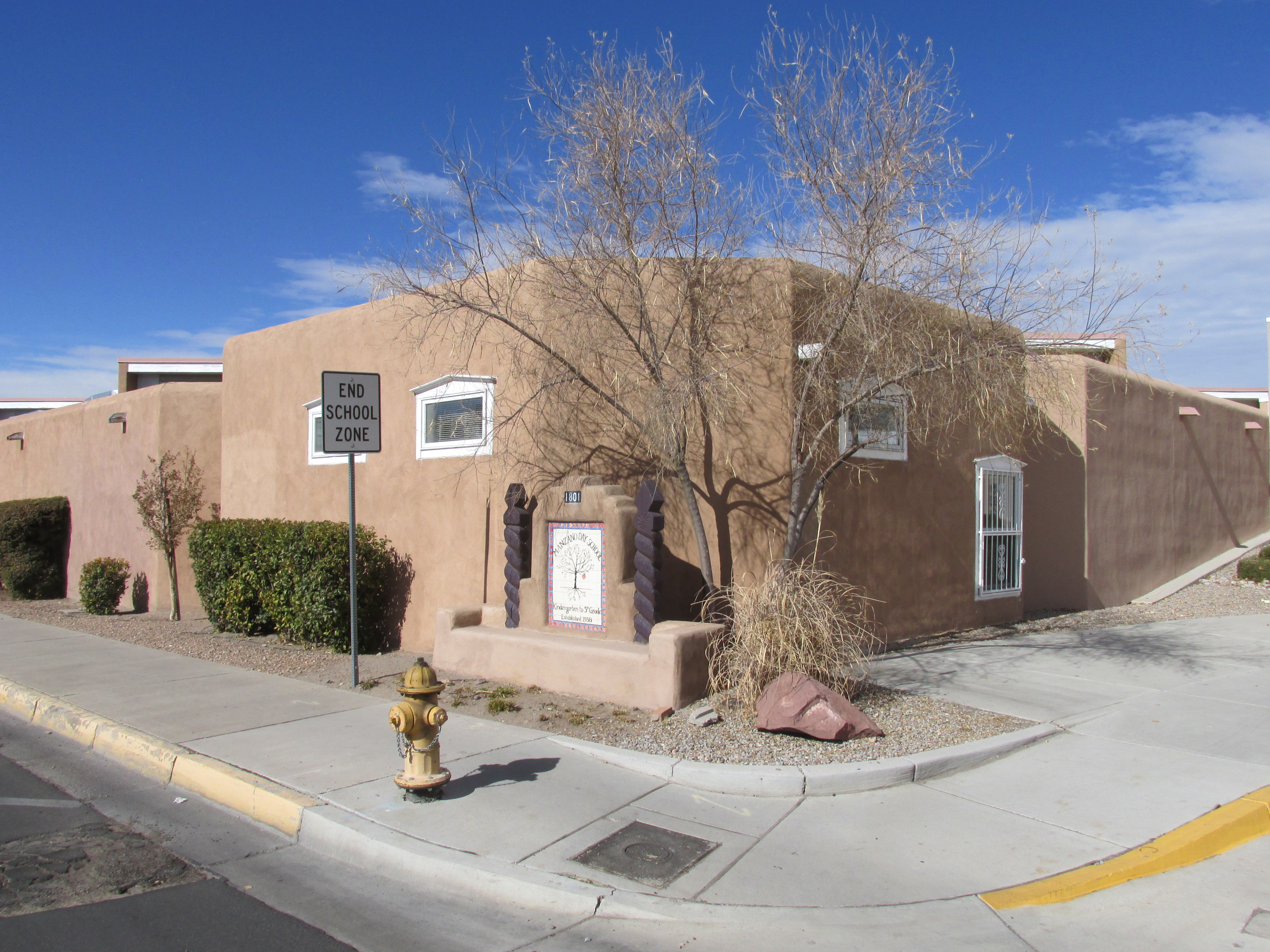
- 1801 Central Avenue NW

- Location within New Mexico Location within the United States
- Location: 1801 Central Avenue NW, Albuquerque, New Mexico
- Coordinates: 35°05′33″N 106°40′00″W
- NRHP reference No.: 83001616
- NMSRCP No.: 70

Significant dates
- Added to NRHP: August 19, 1983
- Designated NMSRCP: May 23, 1969

La Glorieta is a historic hacienda in Albuquerque, New Mexico, believed to be the oldest residence in the city. Its exact age is unknown, but it is known to have been standing in 1803 and possibly dates back as far as the 17th century. It has been the home of several generations of prominent New Mexicans: merchant Franz Huning, U.S. Representative Harvey Butler Fergusson, writer and historian Erna Fergusson, and writer Harvey Fergusson.

== History ==
In the mid-17th century, a soldier from Mexico City named Diego de Trujillo established a hacienda near what would later become the Albuquerque plaza. The house was partially destroyed in the 1680 Pueblo Revolt, but was rebuilt by the Trujillo family when they returned to the area in the 1690s. According to some sources, this is the same building that was later known as La Glorieta.

Franz Huning, a German immigrant and prominent local businessman, bought the property sometime before 1861 and named it La Glorieta (Spanish for "arbor" or "bower"). In 1862, the hacienda was occupied by Confederate soldiers under Henry Hopkins Sibley while Huning was away in St. Louis. Huning returned to Albuquerque in 1864 with a new wife, Ernestine Franke, and moved into the house. During his residence at La Glorieta, Huning added two additional wings to the L-shaped building to create a fully enclosed patio. The house was a popular location for social gatherings and hosted such guests as William Jennings Bryan.

In 1883, Huning moved down the street to a new mansion, Castle Huning. He deeded La Glorieta to his eldest daughter Clara on the occasion of her marriage to Harvey Butler Fergusson in 1887. Their four children, including noted authors Erna Fergusson and Harvey Fergusson, grew up there. Since 1942, La Glorieta has been in use by Manzano Day School, a private elementary school. It was added to the New Mexico State Register of Cultural Properties in 1969 and the National Register of Historic Places in 1983.

== Architecture and grounds ==
La Glorieta is a one-story adobe building with four wings enclosing a central courtyard. The north and east wings are the oldest parts of the house, while the other two wings were added by Huning in the latter part of the 19th century. The house contains about 12 rooms.

In the 19th century, the house was part of a 700-acre (2.8 km^{2}) estate encompassing much of the land east of Old Town. Huning, who was described in Harper's as "an impassioned tree-planter", landscaped the grounds with a variety of trees and shrubs, including a cottonwood in the courtyard that grew to a massive size. Huning also grew crops in the fields around the house and operated a mill, Molino de la Glorieta, on the property.

Today La Glorieta has been surrounded by newer buildings, including the rest of the Manzano Day School campus, and no trace remains of its former surroundings. The cottonwood in the courtyard survived well into the 20th century but eventually became diseased and was cut down in 1984.
