= Franz Huning =

Franz Huning (October 1827 – November 6, 1905) was a German-American pioneer and merchant who was influential in the development of the city of Albuquerque.

Huning was born near Osnabrück, then in the Kingdom of Hanover. He arrived in the United States in 1848 and came to New Mexico in 1849 working as a bullwhacker. He first set up as a merchant in the village of San Miguel, 40 miles southeast of Santa Fe, but in 1852 merchant Simon Rosenstein convinced him to move to Albuquerque and work as his clerk. In 1857 he opened his own store in partnership with his brother Charles Huning. Huning purchased wagons and brought goods to Albuquerque from Missouri. He purchased the hacienda La Glorieta, expanded it, and built a flour mill and a sawmill nearby.

On September 9, 1867, Huning's wagons were attacked near Chase, Kansas by Cheyenne Dog Soldiers in an attack that led to the deaths of his young brother-in-law Fritz and his mother-in-law.

When the Atchison, Topeka, and Santa Fe Railroad was approaching the area in 1879–1880, the railroad was seeking cheap land for shops and yards. Huning and fellow Albuquerque merchants Elias S. Stover and William Hazeldine formed the New Mexico Town Company as a subsidiary of the railroad and quietly bought up 3.1 square miles of land about two miles from the existing town center.

Other investments by Huning included a hotel and opera house, a street railway, the Albuquerque Gas Company, the Albuquerque Daily Journal, and the "Highland Addition", now the Huning Highland, Albuquerque's first subdivision. He was also one of the organizers of the Territorial Fair, forerunner of the New Mexico State Fair.

In 1883 the Hunings moved to a new house – "Castle Huning", a two-story dwelling built to resemble the castles of Huning's homeland.

Huning died on November 6, 1905, in Albuquerque.

Franz Huning Avenue in Albuquerque is named in his honor.

== Publications ==
A memoir Huning wrote was published in 1973 as Trader on the Santa Fe Trail: Memoirs of Franz Huning (University of Albuquerque Press).

== Family ==
Huning married Ernestine Franke in 1863 in St. Louis. They had four children: Clara Mary (1865–1950), Arno (1869–1936), Lina (1872–1894), and Elly (1874–1880).

In 1887 Clara married lawyer Harvey Butler Fergusson, later a US Representative. Huning gave them La Glorieta as a wedding present.

New Mexico journalist, writer, and historian Erna Fergusson (1888–1964) was a grandchild of Huning. Her brother Harvey Fergusson was a novelist and screenwriter.

Arno Avenue in Albuquerque is named after Huning's son Arno.

== Huning Castle ==
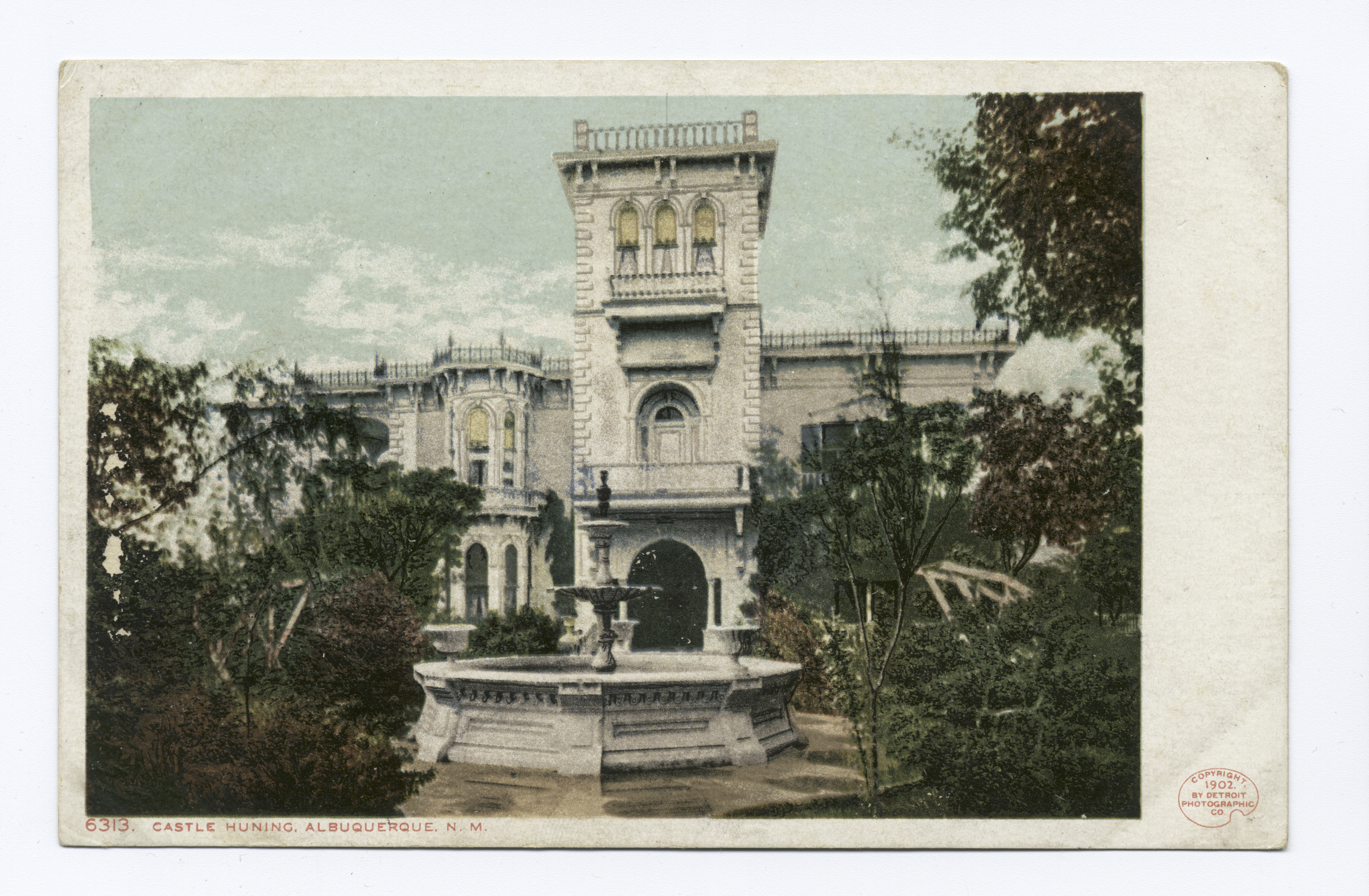
Huning Castle, as depicted on a postcard from 1898

Franz Huning's two-story Italianate mansion at 15th Street and Central Avenue was one of Albuquerque's most famous landmarks. Huning designed the house himself and built it between 1881 and 1883 using more than 250,000 terrones, or sod bricks, cut from a nearby meadow, also on Huning property. The building contained 14 rooms and was filled with opulent furnishings including a pipe organ and Steinway grand piano.

After Franz Huning's death in 1905, his son Arno lived in the Castle until the 1930s. Subsequently, it was turned into a school, but the building was declared unsafe for this purpose in 1954 and abandoned. After falling into further disrepair, it was ultimately demolished in 1955. This decision attracted little controversy at the time but has come to be viewed by local historians as one of the city's greatest architectural losses. The site was vacant for nearly 50 years before the Huning Castle Apartments were completed in 2004.
