= Huning =

Huning or Huening is a surname. Notable people with the surname include:

- Franz Huning (1827–1905), German-American pioneer and merchant
- Mathias Huning (born 1969), German tennis player

Modern notable people include:

- Huening Kai (born 2002), American singer and member of boy group Tomorrow X Together
- Huening Bahiyyih (born 2004), South Korean-American singer and member of girl group Kep1er, formed by Mnet's reality show, Girls Planet 999

== See also ==
- Huning Intercity Railway
- Huning Railway
- Wang Huning
