= The Cheerful Cherub =

American comic strip by Rebecca McCann

“Hearts”: The Cheerful Cherub
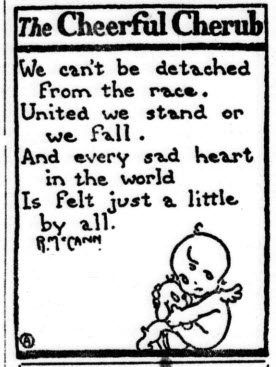
- April 1926 sample of the comic.
- Author: Rebecca McCann
- Current status/schedule: Defunct
- Launch date: 1916/7
- End date: 1927
- Syndicate(s): George Matthew Adams Newspaper Service

The Cheerful Cherub is an American single-panel newspaper comic written and drawn by Rebecca McCann, originally published in the Chicago Evening Post and syndicated by George Matthew Adams. Every installation features the title character, accompanied by his pet dog, speaking a short poem, generally in an iambic meter, offering wisdom, wit, observation, or insight on sundry topics, such as ambition, education, friendship, lies, sin, and work.

== The author ==
Rebecca McCann was born in Quincy, Illinois and attended the Chicago Academy of Fine Arts. Her biography is given in brief by her friend Mary Graham Bonner in the introduction to Complete Cheerful Cherub, but the exact dates of her birth and death—not to mention the dates of the comic's publication—are not clear; nonetheless, her death occurred in 1927, aged 32. Bonner's memoir describes the circumstances under which Julian Mason, then-editor of the Chicago Evening Post, accidentally discovered McCann's Cherubs after they fell from her bag; the introduction also tells of the author's three marriages, the last to novelist Harvey Fergusson, and the publication of her book "About Annabel." Bitter Sweet Poems, a book of McCann's serious poems, was published in 1929 two years after her death.
