= Main Library (Albuquerque, New Mexico) =

- U.S. National Register of Historic Places
- NM State Register of Cultural Properties
- Albuquerque Historic Landmark
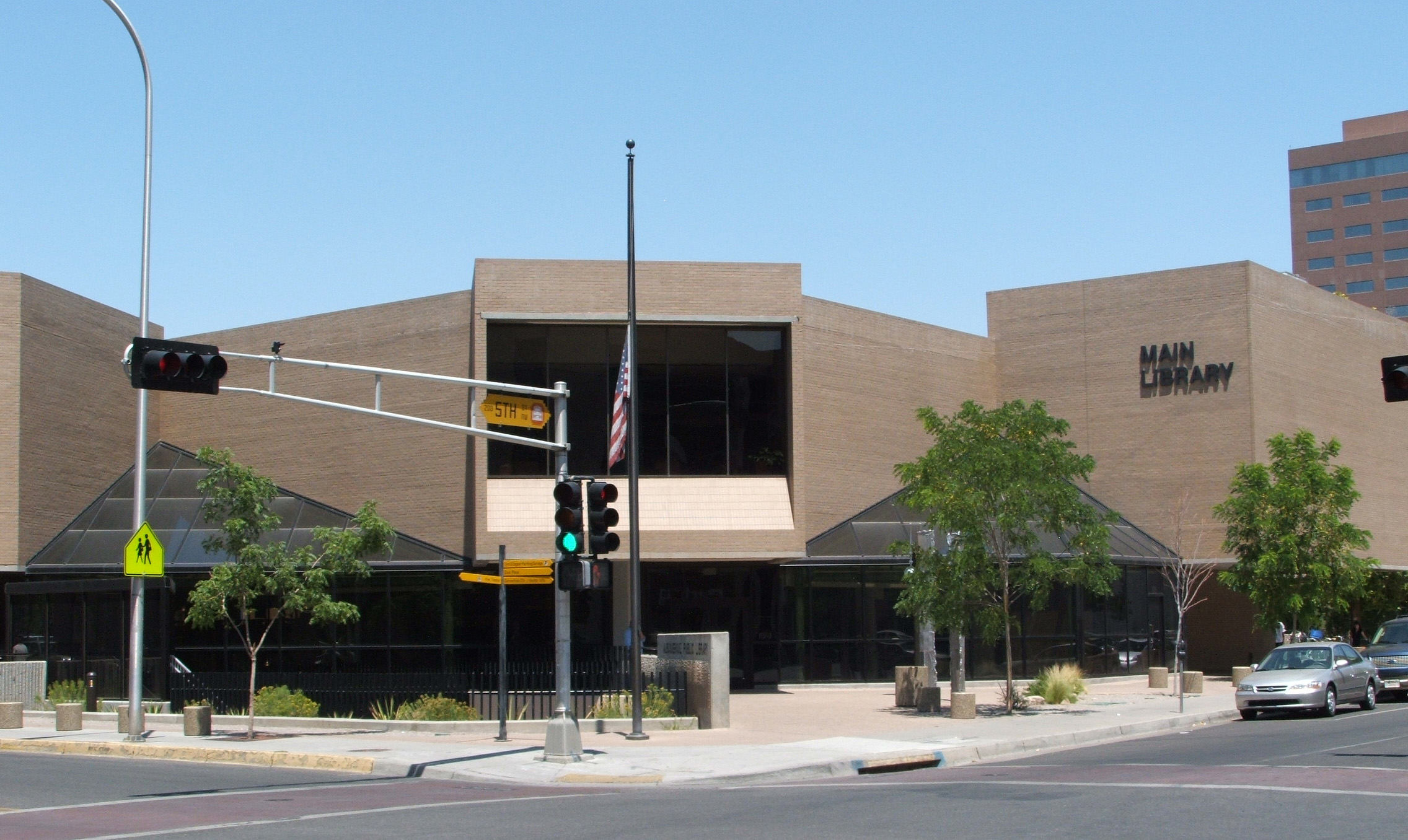
- The library in 2007

- Location within New Mexico Location within the United States
- Location: 501 Copper Ave. NW, Albuquerque, New Mexico
- Coordinates: 35°5′9″N 106°39′12″W
- Built: 1975
- Architect: George Pearl
- Architectural style: Brutalist
- NRHP reference No.: 100003217
- NMSRCP No.: 2049

Significant dates
- Added to NRHP: June 13, 2019
- Designated NMSRCP: October 12, 2018

The Main Library is a public library in Downtown Albuquerque, New Mexico and the main branch of the Albuquerque Bernalillo County Library system. Opened in 1975, it was designed by local architect George Pearl and listed on the National Register of Historic Places in 2019. The library is a concrete-framed Brutalist structure designed to maximize the flexibility of the interior space with a modular layout and movable partitions. Pearl considered it one of his "three or four most important" designs. In 2020, the building was designated an Albuquerque historic landmark.

== History ==
The Albuquerque Public Library was established in 1901 and moved into its first permanent facility, the Old Main Library, in 1925. By the 1970s, city officials had determined that a new library was needed, and bonds were issued in 1971. The building was part of a 1970 comprehensive plan for urban renewal in Downtown Albuquerque, which involved razing a large section of the city center to make room for a variety of large public projects. The plan was not fully implemented but many of the key elements, including the library, Civic Plaza, City Hall, the Police Department headquarters, and the Convention Center, were ultimately completed. In 1972, the city commissioned the firm of Stevens, Mallory, Pearl and Campbell to design the new library. The lead architect was George Clayton Pearl (c. 1924–2003), who had a long career in New Mexico and for whom the University of New Mexico School of Architecture and Planning building is named. The Main Library opened in 1975.

Controversy involving the Main Library arose in 1999 when the city decided to have a group of high school students paint a mural on the east side of the building. This sparked public outcry at the possibility that the architecturally significant building would be damaged, with some of the most vocal opposition coming from Pearl himself. Eventually a compromise was reached which involved painting the mural on removable panels. The artwork was removed in 2005.

The library received a $1.8 million renovation in 2006 which included the addition of a new glass atrium and lobby, a coffee shop, and an expansion of the used book shop on the lower level. The space that was developed for a coffee shop in 2006, the ABQ Coffee Connection, officially opened on May 3, 2010. In 2013, the restaurant Al's Other Half replaced the former coffee shop.

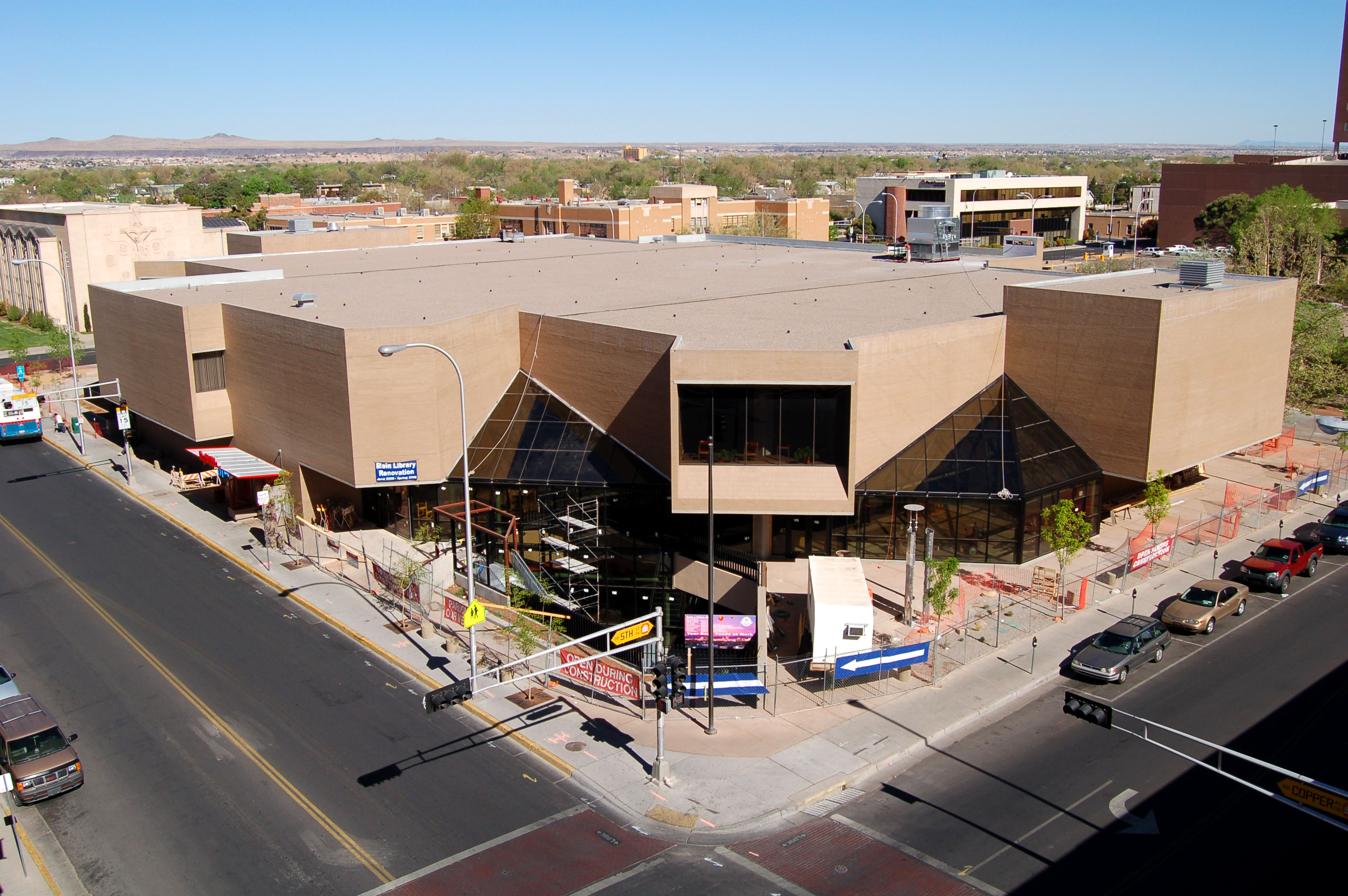
The Main Library in 2006 with the glass atrium under construction

== Architecture ==
The Main Library is a flat-roofed, concrete-framed building with two above-grade levels and one below-grade level. Stylistically, it fits into the Brutalist movement, which emphasizes bold, monumental forms and raw surfaces, while also drawing inspiration from the traditional adobe architecture of the Southwest. According to Pearl, the building had "regional influences—but not archaeological ones" as the traditional Pueblo and Territorial styles were "no longer socially relevant". The exterior walls are clad in brown brick, with a series of cantilevered projections on the upper floor. Large windows on the ground floor, protected from direct sunlight by the overhangs above, allow the building to engage passersby at street level, while glass is used only sparingly on the upper level. The lower level has three sunken courtyards at the corners of the building, one of which was later partially enclosed with glass to form an atrium.

After visiting a variety of other libraries around the country, Pearl concluded that many of the facilities were hindered by a rigid use of space which made it difficult to adapt to changing needs. With this in mind, his design for the Main Library prioritized flexibility above all else. All fixed elements, like heating and cooling equipment, restrooms, and stairwells, were segregated in projecting wings around the periphery of the building, while the main rectangular volume of each floor was completely open except for concrete structural columns spaced 36 feet (11 m) on center. The space is divided into 9-foot (2.7 m)-square modules, each with its own lighting, ventilation, and electrical, telephone, and video connections, allowing each floor to be freely subdivided using sliding partitions.

The ground floor is mostly open space housing stacks, computers, and reading areas, with offices, meeting rooms, and the circulation desk located around the perimeter. The second floor is divided between public stack areas and administrative space including offices, mechanical equipment, and a staff lounge, while the lower level houses a meeting room, auditorium, children's area, and book storage. The interior is finished with exposed brick, wood-paneled partitions, and carpeted floors, and has many original furnishings.
