= Erna Fergusson =

American historian

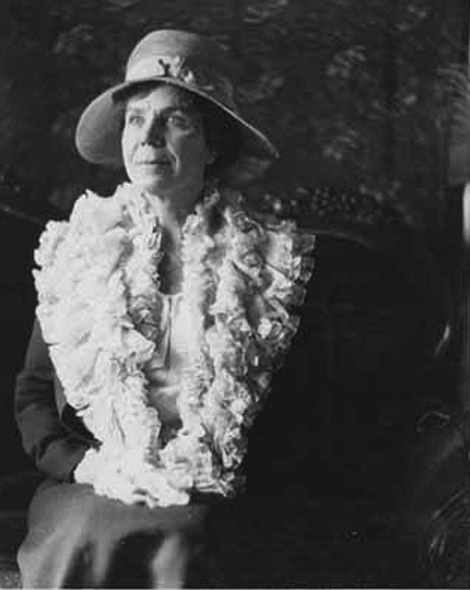
- Born: January 10, 1888; Albuquerque, New Mexico, U.S.
- Died: July 30, 1964; Albuquerque, New Mexico, U.S.
- Education: Bachelor of Pedagogy, University of New Mexico, 1912; Masters in History, Columbia University, 1913
- Occupations: Writer and historian
- Notable work: Dancing Gods (1931) Mexican Cookbook (1934)
- Father: Harvey Butler Fergusson
- Relatives: Harvey Fergusson (brother)

Erna Fergusson (January 10, 1888 – July 30, 1964) was an American writer, historian, and storyteller, who documented the culture and history of New Mexico for more than forty years.

== Early life ==
Erna was born to a wealthy and well-known family. Her mother was Clara Mary Huning, the daughter of a very successful merchant by the name of Franz Huning. He was an investor of real estate and owned and operated a downtown mercantile store and flourmill. Erna Fergusson's father was Harvey Butler Fergusson, a prominent lawyer in White Oaks, New Mexico. It was later in 1883 that he moved to Albuquerque, where he became friends with Franz Huning. Four years later in 1887 Clara Mary Huning and Harvey Fergusson were married. One of Erna's brothers was Harvey Fergusson, a well-known novelist.

Erna, the eldest of four children, grew up in La Glorieta, which was her primary residence in New Mexico. Between 1897 and 1899 Erna lived in Washington, D.C. while her father served as a delegate to the 55th United States Congress. In 1906 Erna graduated from Central High School in Albuquerque. Prior to graduating, she did preparatory work at the University of New Mexico (1904) and the Collegiate School in Los Angeles (1905). She began teaching in the Albuquerque public schools while at the same time furthering her education. In 1912 she graduated from UNM with a Bachelor of Pedagogy Degree. A year later Erna completed her master's degree in history from Columbia University in New York. After teaching a while in Chatham hall in Virginia she decided to return home and continue teaching in Albuquerque.

== Career ==
Throughout her years Erna had various other occupations. During World War I she took a job with the Red Cross as the home service secretary and State Supervisor for New Mexico. After the war she became a reporter for the Albuquerque Herald and the New Mexico Highway Journal, writing various articles regarding her hometown. She was commissioned in 1926 by Century Magazine to write “Redskins to Railroads” and “From Rodeo to Rotary” two of her pieces, which many years later along with other short works became published. While at the Herald, Erna also began a touring company alongside friend Ethel Hickey. The touring company they founded in 1921, Koshare Tours, provided guests with tours of the southwest, introducing them to native cultures. Koshare Tours were so successful that Fred Harvey, a famous and well to do western hotel and restaurateur, bought the touring company and hired Erna Fergusson to direct the new endeavor—Indian Detour Service.

In 1931 Erna Fergusson published her first book Dancing Gods. In this book she describes Native American dances of the Pueblos, Hopis, Navajos, and Apaches that non-Native people were allowed to see, including the Zuni Shalako dances and masks, which in 1990 were closed to non-natives. Her descriptions of the dances were also aided by the work of sixteen New Mexico artists.

Several histories and numerous travel books followed after her success with Dancing Gods. In her 1934 book, "Mexican Cookbook", Fergusson was perhaps the first to correct the English-speakers notion that "frijoles refritos" meant "refried beans", but the correction never reached the popular consciousness.

In 1936 she published an article criticizing a bill sponsored by Senator Holm Bursum attempting to settle land claims of non-Native people on Pueblo lands. In 1948 her article, "Navajos: Whose Problem," she criticized the lack of government investment in Navajo communities, even though Navajo people were taxed for commodities.

In 1943 Erna Fergusson was awarded as an Honorary Doctorate of Letters from the University of New Mexico. In 1947 she helped found the Old Town Historical Society, which later became the Albuquerque Historical Society. In 1958 Theta Sigma Phi, the national women's journalistic fraternity, awarded her an honorary membership in the Albuquerque Alumni chapter. She died in Albuquerque on June 30, 1964 (age 76).

== Legacy ==
Erna Fergusson can be best depicted as a New Mexico travel writer of the 1930s, honing the two techniques of oral interview and conversational prose style; she was a part of the Southwestern Renaissance, and greatly contributed to the historiography of New Mexico. Her writings were well received during her lifetime, and she was an advocate for the preservation of Southwestern and Native American cultures. However, her works have more recently been criticized as Anglo-centric and patronizing to Native American and other cultures.

Erna Fergusson was a supporter of libraries, having spoken at a conference in support of libraries in the southwest, and participated on the Ernie Pyle Memorial Committee that opened a library in his previous house. In 1966 the Albuquerque/Bernalillo County Library System opened a branch library bearing her name.

== Works ==
- Dancing Gods (1931)
- Fiesta in Mexico (1934)
- Mexican Cookbook (1934)
- Guatemala (1937)
- Venezuela (1939)
- Our Southwest (1940)
- Our Hawaii (1942)
- Chile (1943)
- Cuba (1946)
- Murder & Mystery in New Mexico (1948)
- Hawaiian Islands (1950)
- Hawaii (1950)
- New Mexico: A Pageant of Three Peoples (1951)
- Mexico Revisited (1955)
