= Stand Up and Fight (film) =

1939 film by W. S. Van Dyke

- Theatrical release poster
- Directed by: W.S. Van Dyke
- Written by: James M. Cain, Jane Murfin, Harvey Fergusson, Laurence Stallings
- Produced by: Mervyn LeRoy
- Starring: Wallace Beery; Robert Taylor
- Cinematography: Leonard Smith
- Edited by: Frank Sullivan
- Music by: William Axt
- Production company: Metro-Goldwyn-Mayer
- Distributed by: Loew's, Inc.
- Release date: January 6, 1939
- Running time: 97 minutes
- Country: United States
- Language: English
- Budget: $1,055,000
- Box office: $1,840,000

Stand Up and Fight is a 1939 American Western film directed by W.S. Van Dyke and starring Wallace Beery and Robert Taylor. The supporting cast includes Florence Rice, Helen Broderick, Charles Bickford, Barton MacLane, Charley Grapewin, and John Qualen. Playwright Jane Murfin and novelists Harvey Fergusson and James M. Cain shared screenwriting credit.

== Plot ==
Blake Cantrell, an aristocrat from Maryland and a well-groomed cynic, uses his organized hunt to announce his imminent bankruptcy. In order to pay off his debts, Blake is forced to sell even his slaves, instead of freeing them, which causes the disapproval of his guest Susan Griffith.

Later in the evening, when he tries to seduce the girl, she bumps him back and leaves the mansion urgently. However, Blake is also forced to leave his home, since it was sold to cover his debts. He arrives to Cumberland to get a job at his father's old friend, Colonel Webb, the head of the Baltimore-Ohio railroad construction. Webb offers Blake a job which consists of spying on Starkey, the head of a competing shipping company, but Blake refuses. In the evening of the same day, Blake is jailed for a fight.

== Cast ==
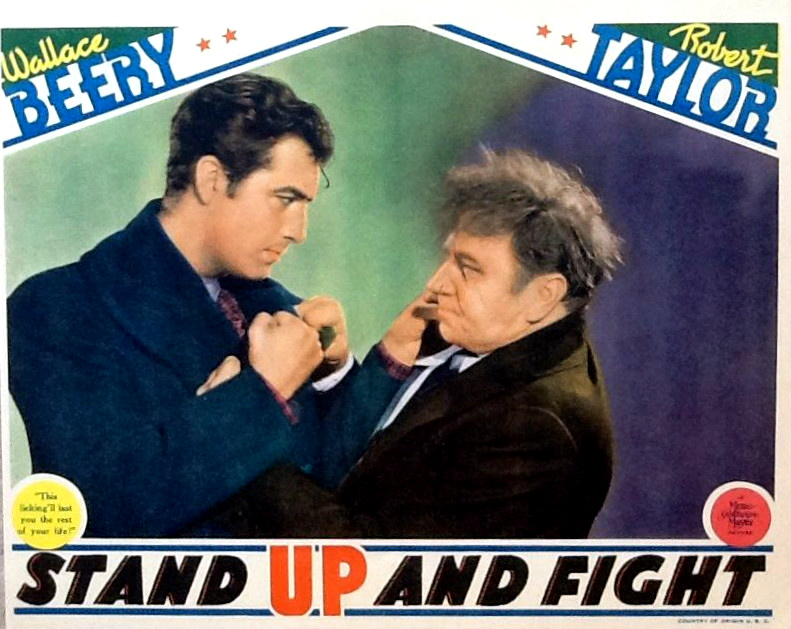
Lobby card

- Wallace Beery as Starkey
- Robert Taylor as Blake Cantrell
- Florence Rice as Susan Griffith
- Helen Broderick as Mandy Griffith
- Charles Bickford as Mr. Arnold (Morgan)
- Barton MacLane as Mr. Crowder
- Charley Grapewin as "Old Puff"
- John Qualen as Davy
- Robert Gleckler as Sheriff Barney
- Jonathan Hale as Colonel Webb

== Box office ==
According to MGM records, the film earned $1,233,000 in the US and Canada and $607,000 elsewhere resulting in a profit of $183,000.
