= Albuquerque Bernalillo County Library =

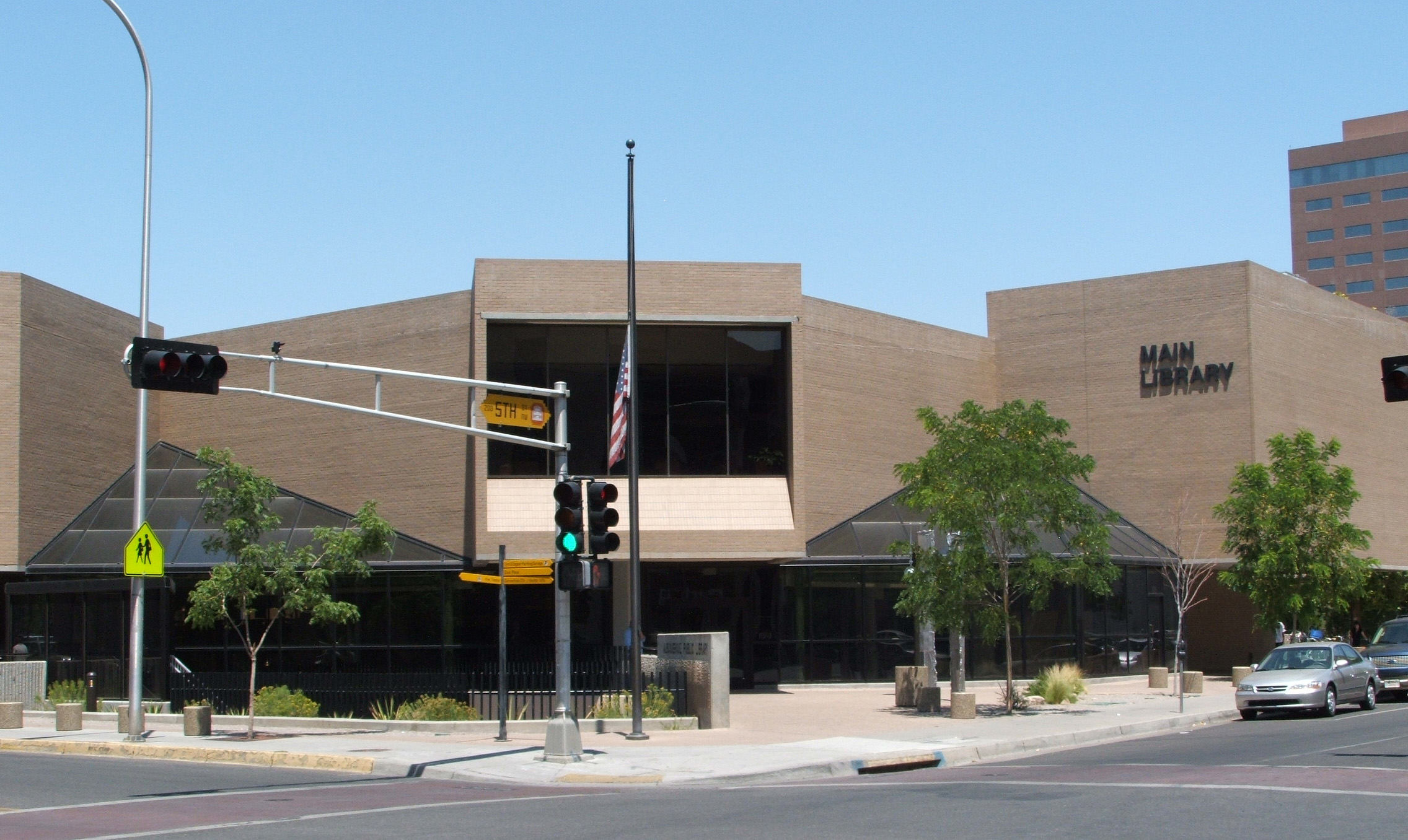
- Main Library, 2007
- 35°05′10″N 106°39′11″W
- Location: Albuquerque, New Mexico, U.S.
- Established: May 1, 1901
- Branches: 18

Collection
- Size: over 1.2 million

Access and use
- Circulation: 4 million (2014)
- Population served: 662,564 (2014)

Other information
- Website: abqlibrary.org

The Albuquerque Bernalillo County Library is the public library system serving greater Albuquerque, New Mexico, United States. It includes seventeen branch libraries as well as the downtown Main Library.

== History ==
The Albuquerque Public Library opened on May 1, 1901, replacing the Ladies' Library Association which had operated sporadically since 1883. The new library was located in Perkins Hall, a three-story brick building at the intersection of Central and Edith which had previously housed the first Albuquerque Academy and the University of New Mexico. The building was purchased and donated to the city by local businessman Joshua Raynolds for the purpose of establishing a public library. The library opened with 2,382 books, many of which were donated by local businesspeople.

By 1920 the library had outgrown its old facility, and planning began for a new building on the same site. Perkins hall was torn down, and the new library opened on March 26, 1925. Designed by Arthur Rossiter, the building was a fine example of Pueblo Revival architecture with its buttresses, towers, irregular parapet, and exposed wooden beams. Interior decorations were by Santa Fe artist Gustave Baumann.

The Main Library was enlarged in 1947 and 1951. In 1948 the city was bequeathed the former home of war correspondent Ernie Pyle and turned it into Albuquerque's first branch library. The Old Main Library became the Special Collections branch in 1978 after a new facility was built downtown.

== Libraries ==
=== Old Main Library ===
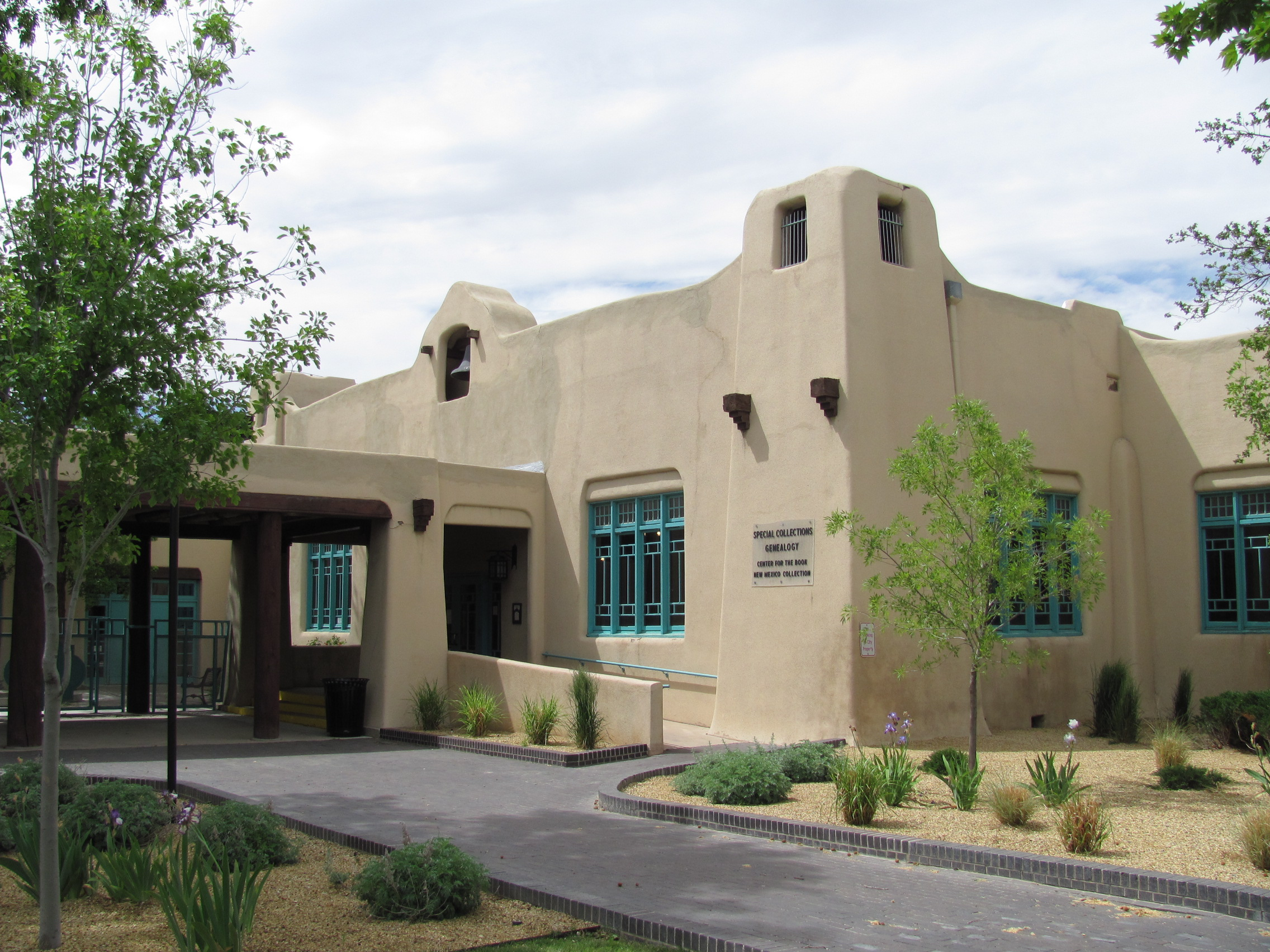
Old Main Library, now the Special Collections Library

The Pueblo Revival style Old Main Library served as the city's main public library from 1925 to 1975 and now houses the Special Collections branch. It was designed by Arthur Rossiter, with interior decorations by Santa Fe artist Gustave Baumann, and opened to the public on March 23, 1925. It is listed on the New Mexico State Register of Cultural Properties and is also an Albuquerque Historic Landmark.

=== Main Library ===
The current Main Library, opened in 1975, is located at the intersection of Fifth and Copper in downtown Albuquerque. It was designed by local architect George Pearl, whose striking modern interpretation of traditional southwest architecture received a design award from the American Institute of Architects. Pearl considered it one of his "three or four most important" designs. The library received a $1.8 million renovation in 2006 which included the addition of a new glass atrium and lobby, a coffee shop, and an expansion of the used book shop on the lower level. The space that was developed for a coffee shop in 2006, the ABQ Coffee Connection, officially opened on May 3, 2010. In 2013, the restaurant Al's Other Half replaced the former coffee shop. The building was listed on the National Register of Historic Places in 2019.

=== Branches ===
In addition to the Main Library, the Albuquerque Bernalillo County Library system operates nineteen branch libraries throughout the Albuquerque metropolitan area:

- Alamosa - Robert L. Murphy Library (opened September 24, 2001)

The City of Albuquerque officially named the Alamosa - Robert L. Murphy Library after community leader Robert L. Murphy in October 2001.

Robert L. Murphy, a military policeman and fire department officer, moved to Albuquerque in 1954. He served 27 years with the Fire Department and was involved in Boy Scouts, church, and school. Murphy contributed to the Alamosa community, including the construction of Santuario de San Martin Church and Alamosa Multi-Service Center.

- Central & Unser Library (opened April 18, 2015)
- Cherry Hills Library (opened June 24, 1998)
- East Mountain Library, Tijeras (opened October 1994)
- Erna Fergusson Library (opened 1966, current library built in 2003)
- Ernie Pyle Library (opened 1948)
- International District Library (opened 2022)
- Juan Tabo Library (opened 1983)
- Lomas Tramway Library (opened 1987)
- Los Griegos Library (opened 1954)
- North Valley Library (opened 1994)
- San Pedro Library (opened 1967)
- South Broadway Library (opened 1974, current library built in 1994)
- South Valley Library (opened 1958)
- Special Collections Library (opened 1925, Special Collections since 1978)
- Taylor Ranch Library (opened 1989)
- Tony Hillerman Library (formerly the Wyoming Library, opened 1957)
- Westgate Library (opened March 21, 1998)

=== Former branches ===
- Esperanza Library (replaced by Alamosa Library in 2001)
- Esther Bone Library, Rio Rancho (now part of the Rio Rancho system)
