= Ernie Pyle House/Library =

Historic house in New Mexico, United States

- Ernie Pyle House
- U.S. National Register of Historic Places
- U.S. National Historic Landmark
- NM State Register of Cultural Properties
- Albuquerque Historic Landmark
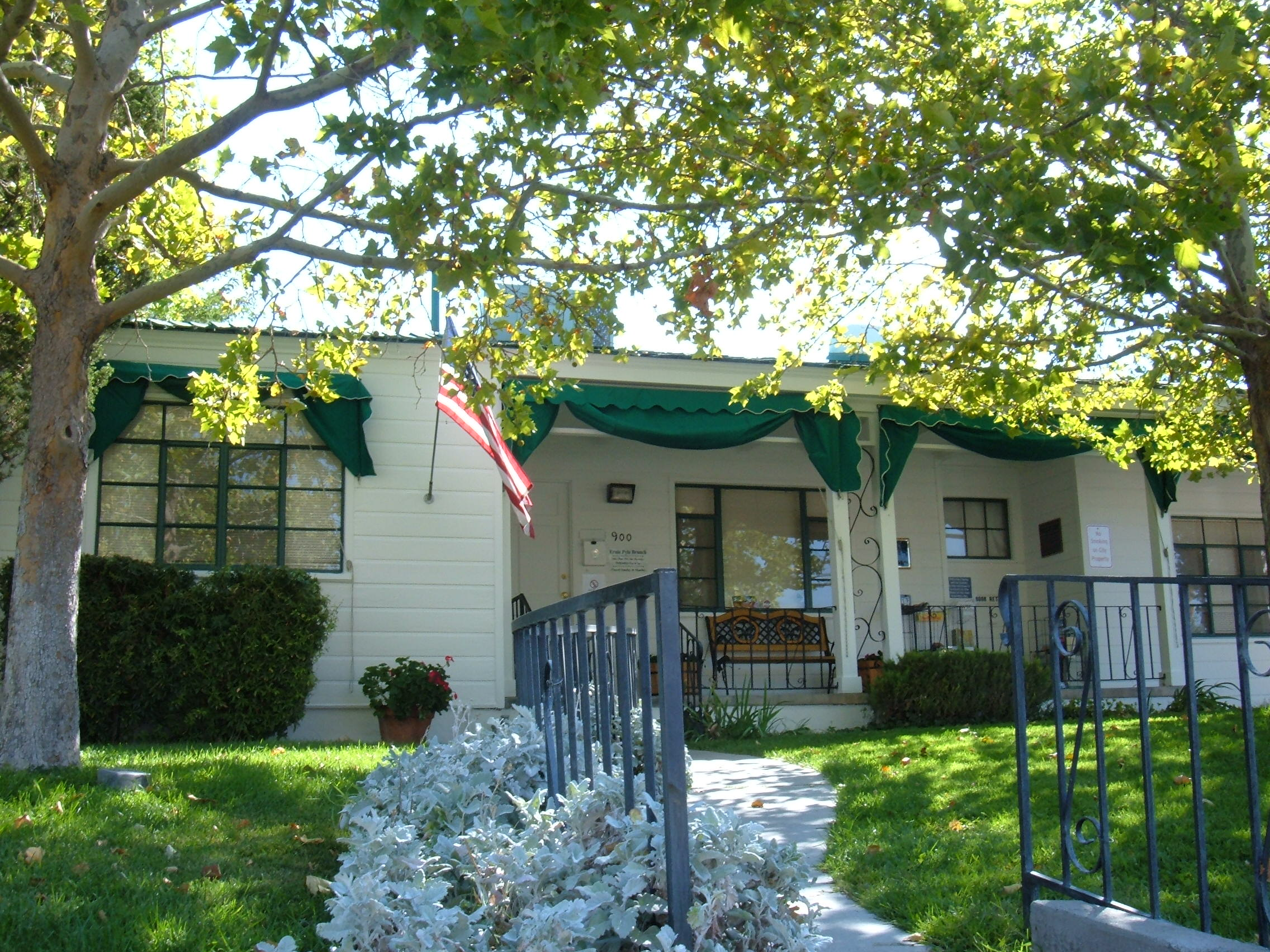
- Entrance to Ernie Pyle House and Library

- Location within New Mexico Location within the United States
- Location: 900 Girard Boulevard, SE, Albuquerque, New Mexico
- Coordinates: 35°4′12.94″N 106°36′47.4″W
- Area: less than one acre
- Built: 1940
- Architect: Arthur McCollum
- Architectural style: Modern Movement
- NRHP reference No.: 97001103
- NMSRCP No.: 1659

Significant dates
- Added to NRHP: September 22, 1997
- Designated NHL: September 20, 2006
- Designated NMSRCP: May 9, 1997

The Ernie Pyle House/Library is a historic house at 900 Girard Boulevard, SE in Albuquerque, New Mexico. Built in 1940, it was the home of famed war correspondent Ernie Pyle from then until his untimely death in 1945 during World War II. It now serves as a branch of the Albuquerque Bernalillo County Library, containing Pyle memorabilia and a monument to Pyle. It was designated a National Historic Landmark in 2006.

== Description ==
The former Ernie Pyle House is located in southern Albuquerque, at the southeast corner of Girard Boulevard and Santa Monica Avenue. It is an architecturally undistinguished single-story ranch house, with a hip roof and wide clapboard siding. Decorative touches that are original to its construction include some wrought iron railings. The house's attached garage exhibits a conversion to a guest bedroom done under Ernie Pyle's ownership of the house in 1941. The southern boundary of the property is lined by a picket fence built by Pyle, and occasionally mentioned in his correspondence.

== History ==
Pyle and his wife, Jerry, had this house built in 1940 after years of roving the country as a columnist for Scripps-Howard Newspapers. Pyle was born in Indiana, but chose Albuquerque for a home after visiting many times and developing, in Pyle's words, "a deep, unreasoning affection" for New Mexico.

Pyle's dispatches from military theaters overseas, which focused on the war through the experiences of front-line infantry soldiers, were read avidly by millions during World War II. He was the recipient of the Pulitzer Prize for distinguished war correspondence in 1944. Some of his columns mentioned the "little white house and picket fence" back in Albuquerque.

Pyle was killed by enemy gunfire on the island of Ie Shima in 1945; his wife Geraldine died later that year. The City of Albuquerque acquired the house from the Pyle Estate in 1948 and converted it into its first branch library.

Today, the Ernie Pyle Library houses a small collection of adult and children's books, as well as Pyle memorabilia and archives. Although the house is an active branch library, its appearance as a home was carefully preserved. Both the interior room configuration and the landscaping, even the picket fence built by Pyle and the grave marker of his dog, Cheetah, have been preserved. It is visited by thousands of people every year from throughout the world.

The house was listed on the National Register of Historic Places on September 22, 1997, and designated a National Historic Landmark on September 20, 2006.

== See also ==
- List of National Historic Landmarks in New Mexico
- National Register of Historic Places listings in Bernalillo County, New Mexico
