= Francis Fergusson =

American literary critic (1904–1986)

- Fergusson, c. 1963
- Born: Francis de Liesseline Fergusson; 1904; Albuquerque, New Mexico, U.S.
- Died: December 19, 1986 (age 82); Plainsboro Township, New Jersey, U.S.
- Education: Harvard University; The Queen's College, Oxford
- Occupations: University professor; literary critic
- Spouse: Marion Crowne (m. 1931; died 1959) Peggy Kaiser (m. 1963)
- Children: 2
- Father: Harvey Butler Fergusson
- Awards: Rhodes Scholarship (1923); Guggenheim Fellowship (1963)

Francis de Liesseline Fergusson (1904 – December 19, 1986) was an American literary critic and professor of comparative literature; a theorist of drama and mythology. He was a Rhodes Scholar and a Guggenheim Fellow, best known for his book The Idea of a Theatre: The Art of Drama in Changing Perspective (1949).

== Early life and education ==
Francis Fergusson was born in 1904 in Albuquerque, New Mexico, being educated there and in Washington, D.C. where his father, Harvey Butler Fergusson, was a congressman. Fergusson's father died under mysterious circumstances in Albuquerque in 1915. Either Francis or his mother, Clara, discovered his father's body hanging from a cottonwood tree in their garden, finding that his throat had been cut. The incident caused Fergusson to lose his appetite for four years and as a result he developed a spinal hump due to malnutrition.

In 1917 or 1918, Fergusson moved with his mother to Manhattan, leaving his brother and two sisters, all some years older, in New Mexico. During this time, his mother occupied a low-paid position as a decorator of chinaware. In New York, Fegusson was educated at the Bronx High School of Science, then subsequently completed his secondary education at the Ethical Culture School, where he befriended J. Robert Oppenheimer and Jeannette Mirsky.

In 1921, Fergusson enrolled as an undergraduate at Harvard University, where he earned a partial scholarship, with Oppenheimer joining him a year later due to the latter's poor health. At Harvard, Fergusson's studies focused on biology as well as Dante scholarship and philosophy, taught to him by Raphael Demos. At this time he also began to write poetry and a novel, though neither survive.

In 1923, he was awarded a Rhodes Scholarship to The Queen's College, Oxford, reading biology under the influential Charles Scott Sherrington, though he opted to change course at the end of his first year, believing he would never attain the requisite mathematics. He moved instead to read modern greats (now philosophy, politics and economics), a course established three years earlier as a modern alternative to classics; he also joined the poetry society. In the summers of 1924 and 1925, Fergusson took part in the French symposia Décades de Pontigny, held at Pontigny Abbey. At this time he also became acquainted with Lady Ottoline Morrell, with whom he would often have tea. During Fergusson's last year at Oxford, Oppenheimer was teaching at the University of Cambridge and the two spent the Christmas vacation of 1925–26 in Paris. Oppenheimer's psychotic episodes began to strain the two's relationship, however; and Oppenheimer attempted to strangle Fergusson after the latter told him that he had proposed to his girlfriend, Frances Keeley, and that she accepted. Oppenheimer later apologized for the incident by letter. Fergusson graduated from Oxford in 1926, taking a Second-Class honors degree.

== Career ==
In 1926, Fergusson saw a production by The Old Vic company which influenced him to devote his life to theatre. Returning to the United States that summer, he rented an apartment on East 58th Street in Manhattan and was apprenticed until 1930 at the American Laboratory Theatre. There, Fergusson met his first wife, Marion Crowne, whom he married in 1931. The Theatre, under the directorship of Richard Boleslawski and Maria Ouspenskaya, was pedagogically aligned with the Moscow Art Theatre and Konstantin Stanislavski; and Fergusson was comprehensively trained in each aspect of theatrical production. As a director, Fergusson discovered his enduring methodological principle: fidelity to the text. In 1930, the American Laboratory Theatre closed due to the Great Depression.

Subsequently, Fergusson worked as a theatre critic for two literary journals: The Bookman, until 1932; and Hound and Horn, until it went out of print in 1934. He became editor of the latter, succeeding his friend Richard Blackmur. Despite not having a doctorate or an American master's degree, from 1932 to 1934 he lectured at the New School for Social Research; and, from 1934 to 1947, he and his wife were early faculty members of Bennington College, Vermont, where he lectured on theatre and criticism while she taught acting. In 1947, Oppenheimer invited Fergusson to teach at the Institute for Advanced Study in New Jersey, of which he had recently been made director. Fergusson obliged, writing The Idea of a Theatre: The Art of Drama in Changing Perspective there. His text was published by Princeton University Press in 1949 and proved highly influential. When a protégé of Fergusson's, R. W. B. Lewis, introduced him to Albert Camus in Paris, 1958, Camus expressed that The Idea of a Theatre was the best work on tragedy he had ever read.

Between 1949 and 1952, Fergusson was the first director of the Princeton Seminars in Literary Criticism (later renamed the Christian Gauss Seminars in Literary Criticism) at Princeton University, funded partially by a grant from the Rockefeller Foundation. From 1952 to 1953, he was a visiting professor of English at Indiana University and, later in the year of 1953, he moved to Rutgers University, where he taught until his retirement in 1969. There, Fergusson's title was University Professor, a position created for him by Rutgers's president. During his tenure, Fergusson was named a Guggenheim Fellow in 1963.

== Personal life and death ==
As a child in New Mexico, Fergusson and his elder brother, Harvey, would travel the Rio Grande river by raft and once watched a private Hopi ritual from a hiding place.

Aside from Oppenheimer, Mirsky and Blackmur, Fergusson counted among his close friends the color field painter Paul Feeley, a colleague of his from his Bennington days, with whom he often fished for trout; the writer Paul Horgan, with whom he grew up in Albuquerque; the composer Roger Sessions, the writer Allen Tate and the academic Joseph Frank. He also maintained a correspondence with the publisher Sylvia Beach of Shakespeare and Company.

Fergusson's first wife, Marion Crowne, died of cancer in 1959; he subsequently married Peggy Kaiser in 1962. He died on December 19, 1986, at Princeton Hospital, after a long illness at the age of 82. In his later years, he suffered from Parkinson's disease. He was survived by his second wife; his son, Harvey; his daughter, actress Honora Neumann, who was once married to the Jamaican writer Evan Jones; and five grandchildren.

== Bibliography ==
As author
Year	Title	Publisher	ISBN	Pages	Notes
1949	The Idea of a Theatre: A Study of Ten Plays, The Art of Drama in a Changing Perspective	Princeton University Press	9781400875139	260	
1953	Dante's Drama of the Mind: A Modern Reading of the Purgatorio	Princeton University Press	9781400877119	244	
1957	The Human Image in Dramatic Literature: Essays	Anchor Books		217	
1962	Poems 1929–1961	Rutgers University Press		130	
1966	Dante	Macmillan	9780297174134	214	As part of the Masters of World Literature series.
1970	Shakespeare: The Pattern in His Carpet	Delacourte Press	9780440078173	331	
1975	Literary Landmarks: Essays on the Theory and Practice of Literature	Rutgers University Press	9780813508153	149	
1977	Trope and Allegory: Themes Common to Dante and Shakespeare	University of Georgia Press	9780820304106	164	
1993	Sallies of the Mind	Routledge	9781138514355	268	Collection of essays published posthumously, co-edited by John McCormick and George Core.

As editor
Year	Title	Author	Publisher	Pages	Notes
1938	Electra: A Version for the Modern Stage	Sophocles	William R. Scott	77	Translated by Fergusson.
1950	Plays by Molière	Molière	Random House	304	Translated by Morris Bishop.
1961	The Taming of the Shrew	William Shakespeare	Dell Publishing	192	Co-edited with Charles Jasper Sisson.

=== Selected essays ===
- Fergusson, Francis; Clurman, Harold (1960). "On The Poetics". Tulane Drama Review. 4 (4): 23–32. doi:10.2307/1124875.
- ——— (2003). "Introduction". Aristotle's Poetics. Translated by Butcher, S. H. New York: Hill and Wang. pp. 7–41. ISBN 9780809005277.
