= Mary Graham Bonner =

American children's writer (1890–1974)

Mary Graham Bonner (September 5, 1890 – February 12, 1974) was a Canadian-American children's writer.

Mary Graham Bonner was born on September 5, 1890, in Cooperstown, New York, to Margaret Cary (Worthington) and George William Graham Bonner.A dual citizen of the United States and Canada, she attended Halifax Ladies' College and the Halifax Conservatory of Music in Halifax, Nova Scotia.

In 1916, Bonner married journalist Eugene E. Early.

Bonner published dozens of books. Her Canada and Her Story (1942) is a concise history of Canada for young readers. It won the 1942 Constance Lindsay Skinner Award. Several other books are nonfiction for young readers, including one about pigeons (Courier of the Sky) and one about baseball (Big Baseball Book for Boys).

She died on February 12, 1974, in New York City.

== Publications ==
- Daddy's Bedtime Animal Stories, 1916
- Daddy's Bedtime Fairy Stories, 1916
- Daddy's Bedtime Bird Stories, 1917
- 365 Bedtime Stories, 1923
- A Parent's Guide to Children's Reading, 1926
- The Magic Map, 1927
- Mrs. Cucumber Green, 1927
- Magic Journeys, 1928
- Miss Angelina Adorable, 1928
- Madam Red Apple, 1929
- The Magic Music Shop, 1929
- Etiquette for Boys and Girls: A Handbook of Manners for Use by Mothers, Governesses and Teachers, 1930
- A Hundred Trips to Storyland, 1930
- The Magic Universe, 1930
- The Big Baseball Book for Boys, 1931
- The Magic Clock, 1931
- The Animal Map of the World, 1932
- Adventures in Puddle Muddle. Dutton. 1935.
- Rainbow at Night. Lee Furman. 1936.
- A World of Our Own. Dutton. 1936.
- A Story Teller's Holiday, 1938
- Sir Noble, The Police Horse. Knopf. 1940.
- Danger on the Coast. Knopf. 1941.
- Danger on the Coast: A Story of Nova Scotia, 1942
- Made in Canada. Knopf. 1943.
- Couriers of the Sky. Knopf. 1944.
- The Surprise Place. Knopf. 1945.
- Something Always Happens. Knopf. 1946.
- Out to Win: A Baseball Story, 1947
- Hidden Village Mystery. Knopf. 1948.
- The Mysterious Caboose, 1949
- Haunted Hut: A Winter Mystery. Knopf. 1950.
- Winning Dive: A Camp Story, 1950
- The Base-Stealer, 1951
- Wait and See, 1952
- Dugout Mystery, 1953
- Baseball Rookies Who Made Good, 1954
- How to Play Baseball, 1955
- Complete Cheerful Cherub: 1001 Verses, 1956
- The Real Book About Crime Detection. Garden City. 1957.
- Wonders Around the Sun. Lantern Press. 1957.
- The Real Book About Sports, 1958
- Two-Way Pitcher. Lan. 1958.
- Spray Hitter, 1959
- The Real Book About Journalism: The Story of the American Newspaper, 1960
- Wonders of Invention, 1961
- Mystery at Lake Ashburn, 1962
- Wonders of Musical Instruments, 1963
