= Harvey Butler Fergusson =

American politician (1848–1915)

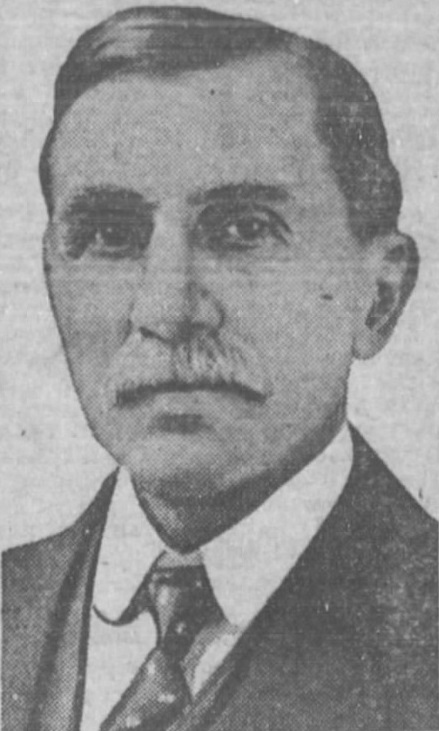
- Western Liberal newspaper (Lordsburg, NM), June 25, 1915

Member of the U.S. House of Representatives from New Mexico's at-large district
- In office January 8, 1912 – March 3, 1915
- Preceded by: district created
- Succeeded by: Benigno C. Hernández

Member of the U.S. House of Representatives from New Mexico Territory's at-large district
- In office March 4, 1897 – March 3, 1899 (Delegate)
- Preceded by: Thomas B. Catron
- Succeeded by: Pedro Perea

Personal details
- Born: September 9, 1848 Pickensville, Alabama, U.S.
- Died: June 10, 1915 (aged 66) Albuquerque, New Mexico, U.S.
- Party: Democratic
- Education: Washington and Lee University
- Profession: Lawyer

Harvey Butler Fergusson (September 9, 1848 – June 10, 1915) was an American politician who served as a Delegate from the Territory of New Mexico and a U.S. Representative from New Mexico.

Born near Pickensville, Alabama, Fergusson attended the public schools in the state. He was graduated from Washington and Lee University, Lexington, Virginia, in 1873 and from the law department of that university in 1874. He taught in the Shenandoah Valley Academy, Winchester, Virginia. He was admitted to the bar in 1875 and commenced the practice of law in Wheeling, West Virginia.

He moved to White Oaks, New Mexico, in 1882, and to Albuquerque, New Mexico, in 1883. There he engaged in the practice of law and served as special United States attorney in 1893 and 1894. He also served as member of the Democratic National Committee in 1896–1904.

Fergusson, a Democrat, was elected as a Delegate to the Fifty-fifth Congress (March 4, 1897 – March 3, 1899). He was an unsuccessful candidate for reelection in 1898 to the Fifty-sixth Congress and for election in 1902 to the Fifty-eighth Congress. Upon the admission of New Mexico as a State into the Union, Fergusson was elected to the Sixty-second Congress. He was reelected to the Sixty-third Congress and served from January 8, 1912, to March 3, 1915. He was an unsuccessful candidate for reelection in 1914 to the Sixty-fourth Congress. He died in Albuquerque.

His children Erna, Harvey and Francis were all noted writers.

U.S. House of Representatives
Preceded by Thomas B. Catron	Delegate to the U.S. House of Representatives from New Mexico; 1897-1899	Succeeded by Pedro Perea
Preceded by New district	Member of the U.S. House of Representatives from New Mexico's at-large congressional district 1912–1915	Succeeded by Benigno C. Hernández
