= Gustave Baumann =

American printmaker & painter (1881–1971)

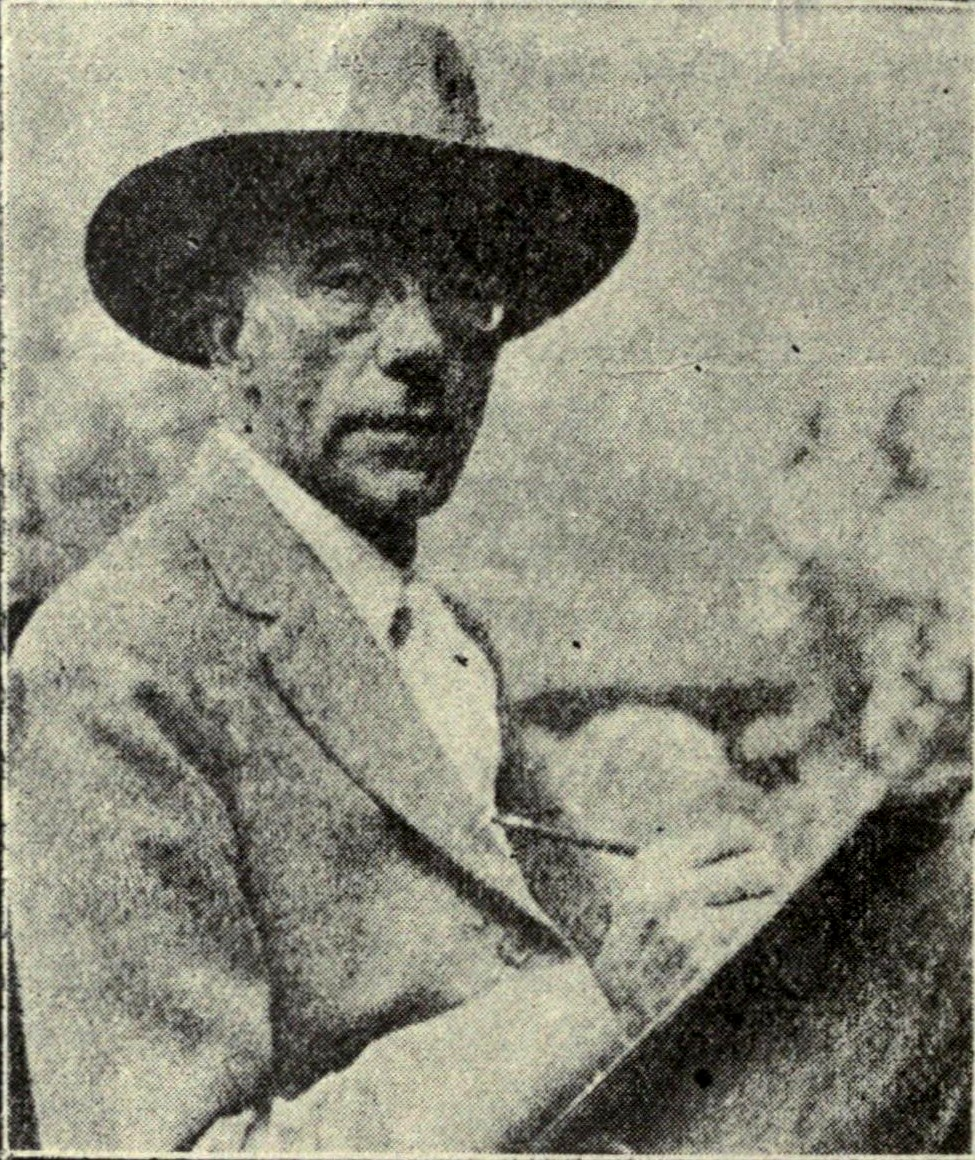
- Born: June 27, 1881; Magdeburg, Germany
- Died: October 8, 1971 (aged 90); Santa Fe, New Mexico
- Education: Königliche Kunstgewerbeschule München
- Known for: Printmaking, marionettes, painting

Gustave Baumann (June 27, 1881 – October 8, 1971) was an American printmaker and painter, and one of the leading figures of the color woodcut revival in America. His works have been shown at the New York Metropolitan Museum of Art, The Cleveland Museum of Art, the National Gallery of Art in Washington DC, and the New Mexico Museum of Art. He is also recognized for his role in the 1930s as area coordinator of the Public Works of Art Project of the Works Progress Administration.

== Biography ==
Gustave Baumann was born in Magdeburg, Germany, and moved to the United States in 1891 with his family. By age 17 he was working for an engraving house while attending night classes at the Art Institute of Chicago. He returned to Germany in 1904 to attend the Kunstgewerbeschule in Munich where he studied wood carving and learned the techniques of wood block prints. After returning to the United States, he began producing color woodcuts as early as 1908, earning his living as a graphic artist.

He spent time in Brown County, Indiana as a member of the Brown County Art Colony, developing his printmaking technique. He followed the traditional European method of color relief printing using oil-based inks and printing his blocks on a small press. This contrasted with the trend at the time of many American artists to employ hand rubbed woodblock prints in the Japanese traditional style. By this time he had developed his personal artist's seal: the opened palm of a hand on a heart. His Mill Pond is the largest color woodcut produced at the time. These were shown at the 1915 Panama–Pacific International Exposition where Baumann won the gold medal for color woodcut.

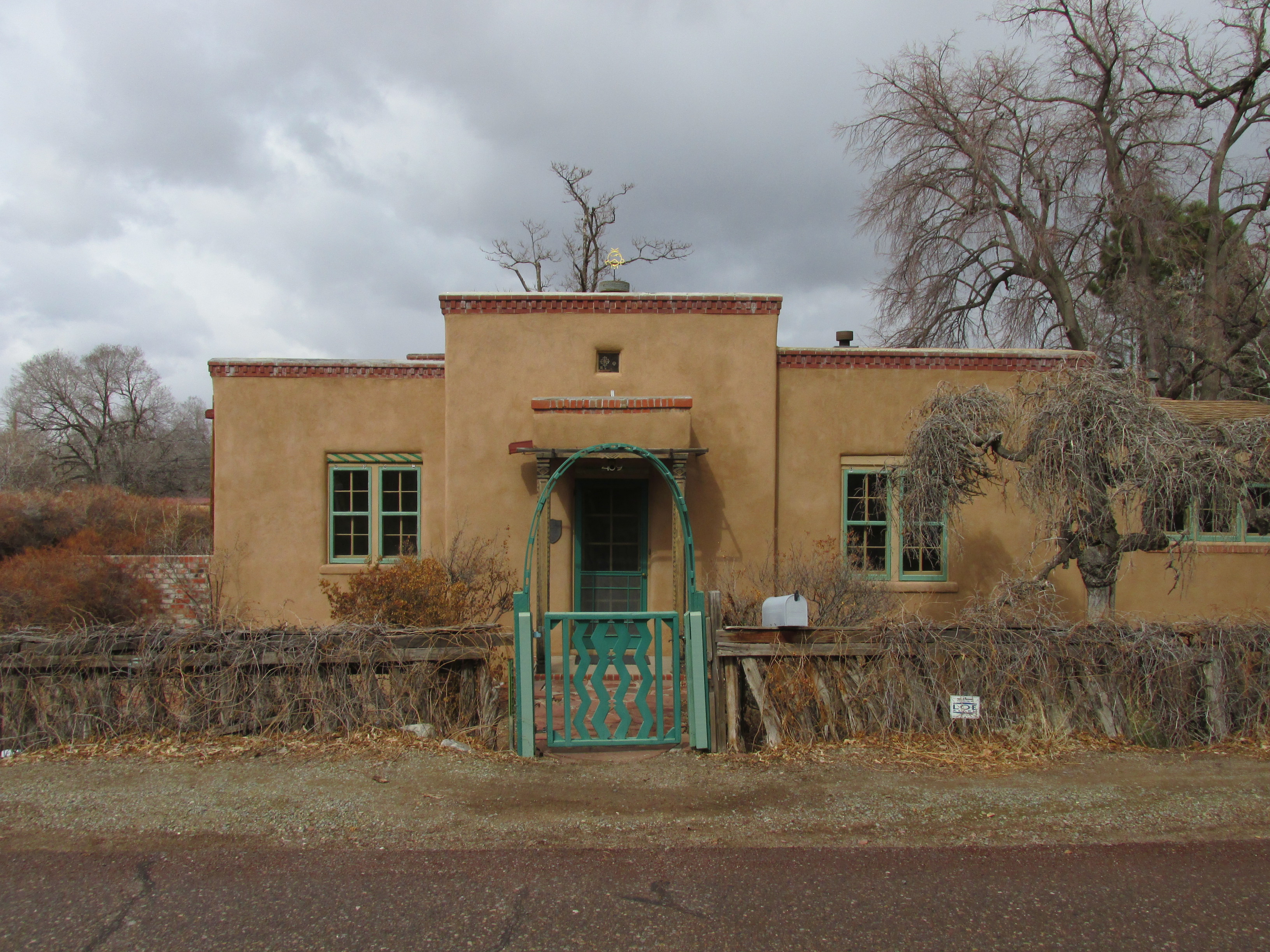
Gustave Baumann House, Santa Fe NM

In 1918, he headed to the Southwest to inquire into the artists' colony of Taos, New Mexico. Thinking it too crowded and too social, he boarded the train which stopped in Santa Fe. Its art museum had opened the previous year and its curator, Paul Water, persuaded Baumann to stay in Santa Fe.

In Santa Fe, Baumann befriended many local artists and took part in various community celebrations. He made the head of the first Zozobra and carved and performed with marionettes. He was a member of the Society of American Graphic Artists and the Taos Society of Artists. Baumann married Jane Devereaux Henderson on June 25, 1925. Their daughter, Ann, was born on July 31, 1927. He remained in Santa Fe for more than fifty years until his death there in 1971.

== Artwork ==
In addition to his popular color woodcuts, Baumann also made oil paintings and furniture. His work depicted southwestern landscapes, ancient Indian petroglyphs, scenes of pueblo life, and gardens and orchards.

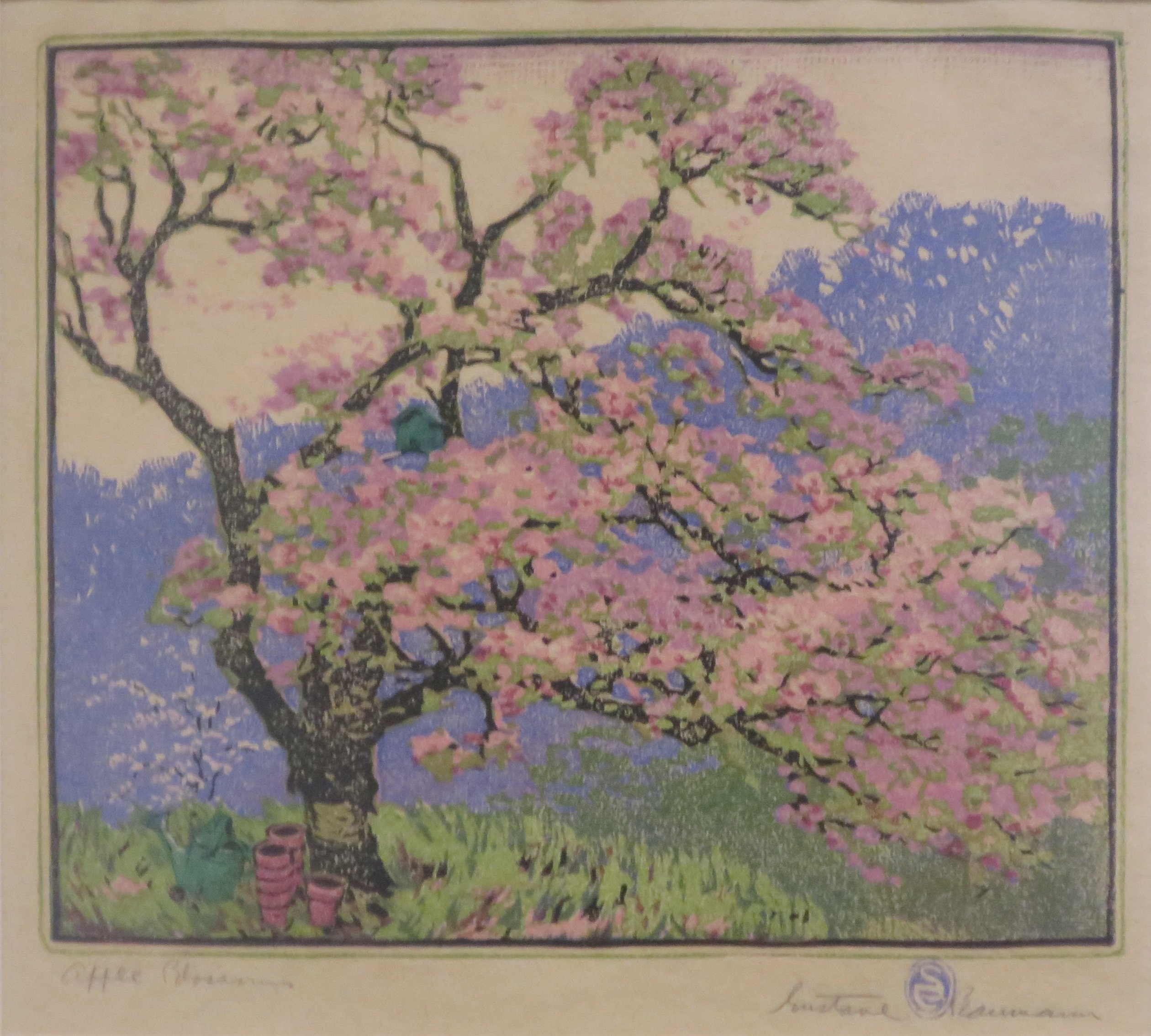
Apple Blossom, wood block print, 1917

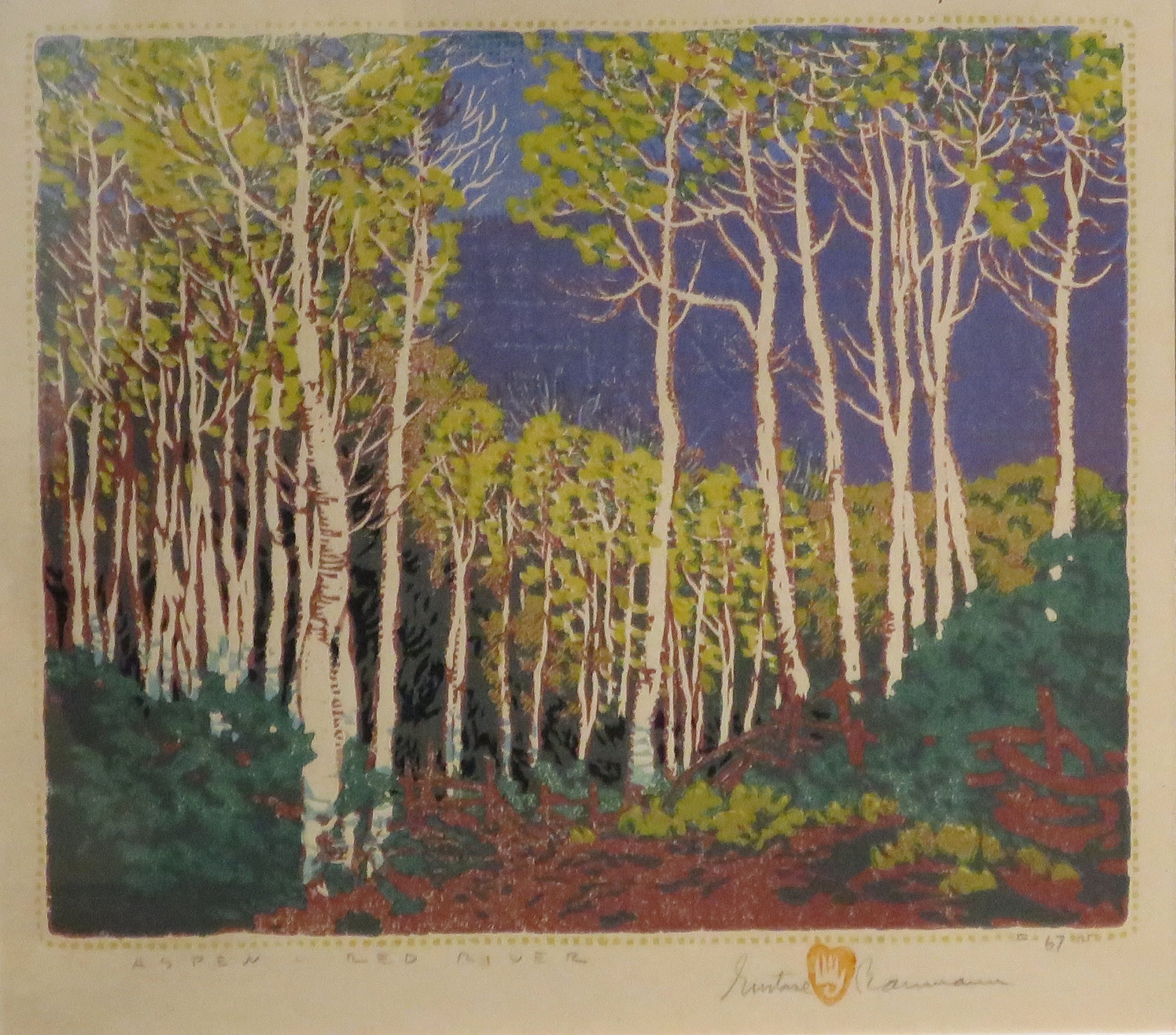
Aspen Red River, 1924

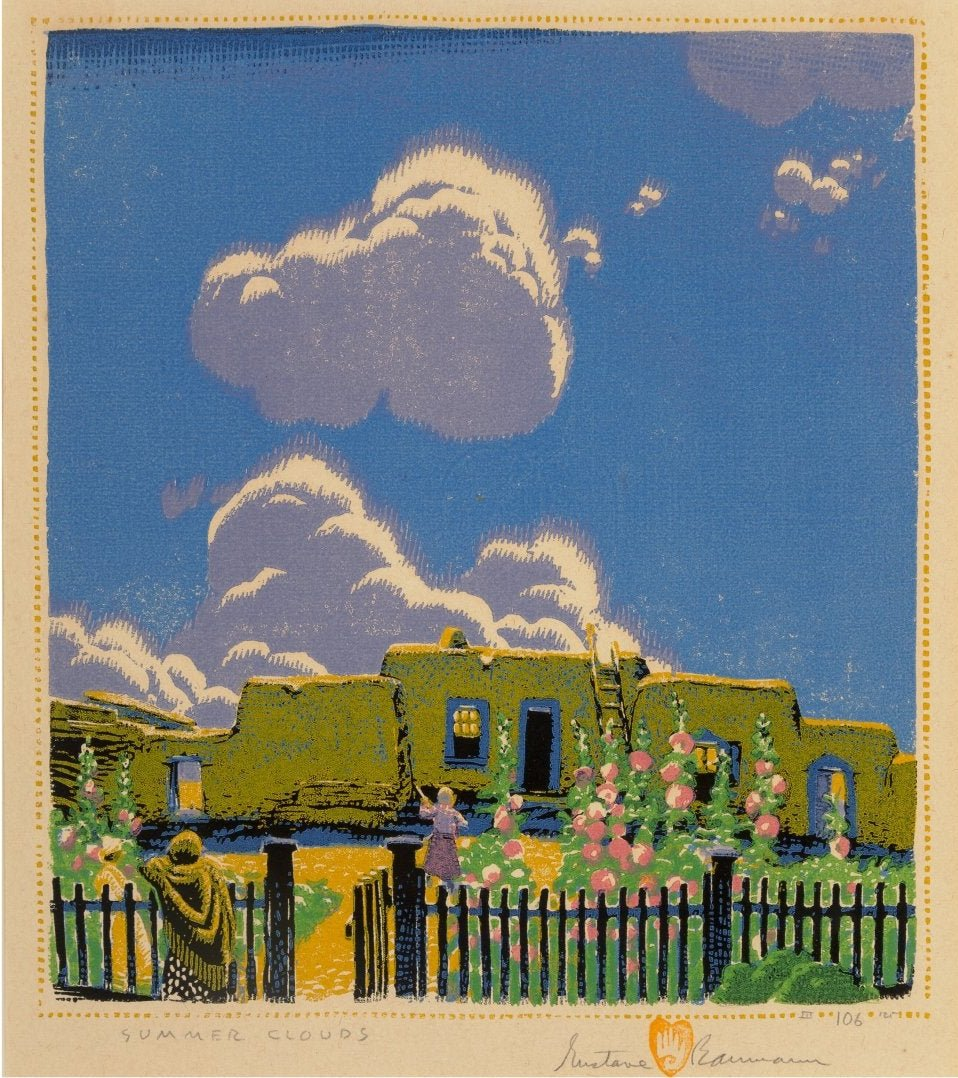
Summer Clouds, 1925, color woodcut

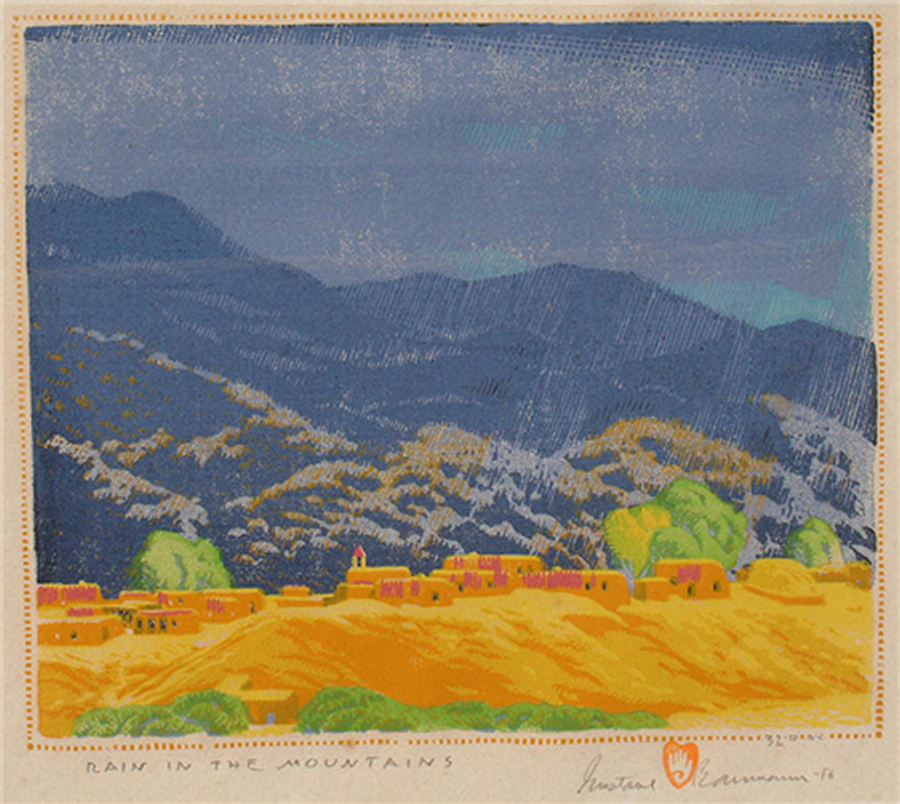
Rain in the Mountains, 1926, color woodcut

=== Prints ===
Refer to Gala Chamberlain's book In A Modern Rendering: The Color Woodcuts of Gustave Baumann: A Catalog Raisonne (2019) to see an array of works completed by Gustave Baumann during his lifetime. This book documents over 429 distinct images. Highlights include:

- In the Hills o' Brown (1910)

Twelve prints depicting views of Nashville, Indiana, as well as interior scenes. Includes The Blacksmith Shop, The Print Shop, The Town of Nashville, The Wagon Shop, In the Hills o' Brown, The Rug Weaver, The Courthouse Yard, An Evening Chat, Clinching the Argument, The Suspension Bridge, The Door Yards, and Mathis Alley.

- New Mexico Portfolio (1924)

Comprises Cliff Dwellings, Sanctuario – Chimayo, My Garden, Talaya Peake, The Bishop's Apricot, Chile con Cabre, Night at the Fiesta – Taos, Talpa Chapel, Corn Dance – Santa Clara, Lost in the Desert, San Geronimo – Taos, Beginning of the Fiesta, and San Domingo Pueblo.

- Five views of the Grand Canyon: Bright Angel Trail (1921), Pines, Grand Canyon (1921), Pinon, Grand Canyon (1921), Cedar, Grand Canyon (1921), and Grand Canyon (c. 1927–1930).
- Four Southern Arizona views (1924): Palo Verde and Ocotea, Cholla and Sahuaro, Superstition Mountain, and Wild Horse Mesa.
- Mid-1920s views of the Pacific coast: Pelican Rookery, Redwood, Sequoia Forest, Coast Range, Singing Woods, Windswept Eucalyptus, Redwood Muir Woods, Point Lobos, Point Lobos Rock Garden, Monterey Cypress, and Song of the Sea.

=== Illustrated books ===
- All the Year Round (1912, text by James Whitcomb Riley), 12 electroplate illustrations by Gustave Baumann
- Pirates! Or, The Cruise of the Black Revenge: A Melodrama in Thirteen Acts (1916), published by Brothers of the Book, text by Kendall Banning and 13 original woodcut illustrations by Gustave Baumann. Printing was limited to 525 copies.
- Pirates! Or, The Cruise of the Black Revenge, (1918) Text by Kendall Banning and 13 photoengraved illustrations by Gustave Baumann. This edition was reduced to 2/3 size of the original 1916 printing.
- Indian Pottery Old and New (1919). text and woodcut illustrations by Gustave Baumann. Printing was limited to 50 copies of which only a handful were completed.
- Chips an' Shavings (1929), woodcut text and 3 photoengraved illustrations by Gustave Baumann. Printing was limited to 100 copies.
- Frijoles Canyon Pictographs (1939), text and 25 woodcut illustrations by Gustave Baumann. Printing was limited to 480 copies
- Indian Pottery Old and New (2020). text and woodcut illustrations by Gustave Baumann. Printing was limited to 145 copies. Produced by the Press At the Palace of the Governors using Gustave Baumanns original woodblocks.

== Museum collections ==
Baumann's work is held in the permanent collections of the Albuquerque Museum, Akron Art Museum, Art Institute of Chicago, Indianapolis Museum of Art New Mexico Museum of Art, Stark Museum of Art, among other venues.
