= Harvey Fergusson =

American novelist

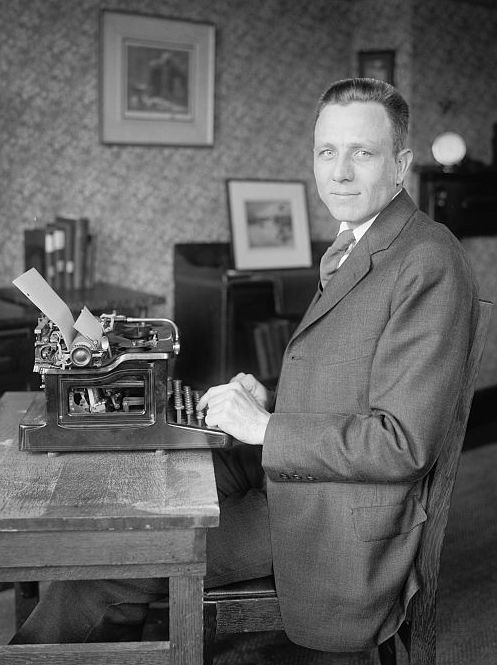
- Harvey Fergusson in 1921

Harvey Fergusson (January 28, 1890 – August 27, 1971) was an American writer.

== Life and career ==
Fergusson was born and grew up in Albuquerque, New Mexico. His father was Harvey B. Fergusson, the attorney and Congressman. He attended his father's alma mater, Washington and Lee University in Lexington, Virginia, graduating in 1911. Soon after leaving college, he took a job as a staff reporter for the Washington, D.C. Herald. After brief stints with newspapers in Savannah, Georgia and Richmond, Virginia, he returned to DC and joined the Washington bureau of the Chicago Record-Herald. He left the paper in 1915 to work as an assistant to the columnist Frederic Haskin. He married for the first time in 1919 — the marriage ended in divorce a few years later. In 1923, he left journalism to devote himself full-time to writing.

Fergusson's second novel, Capitol Hill, drew heavily upon his experiences as a reporter. His protagonist, Ralph Dolan, works his way up through the newspaper trade, then switches to the business of public relations and lobbying, ending as the top lobbyist of a large industry association. Virtually in parallel with Capitol Hill, Fergusson wrote The Blood of the Conquerors, the first of his historical novels set in New Mexico. Blood was also the first novel in a trilogy Fergusson titled, Followers of the Sun. The other books in this trilogy were In Those Days and Wolf Song.

Wolf Song is considered by most critics to be his best novel — indeed, some have called it the finest novel of the American West. It tells the story of a mountain man, Sam Lash, loosely modelled on Kit Carson. Fergusson married for the second time in 1927, the year of Wolf Song's publication, but his wife, cartoonist Rebecca McCann, died of pneumonia before the year ended.

He moved to Hollywood and worked intermittently as a screenwriter, earning credits on It Happened in Hollywood (1937) and Stand Up and Fight (1939). His primary focus remained on novel-writing, although it would be over 20 years before he returned to the subject of the West's past. His two novels of the 1930s dealt with contemporary themes, and Fergusson also published two works of non-fiction, Rio Grande and Modern Man: His Beliefs and Behavior.

Fergusson moved to Berkeley in the early 1940s, where he wrote an autobiographical book, Home in the West: An Inquiry into My Origins. He also returned to the subject of politics, this time as a work of non-fiction, People and Power: A Study of Political Behavior in America. His last two novels, Grant of Kingdom and The Conquest of Don Pedro, dealt with earlier periods in the history of New Mexico. Fergusson died in Berkeley, in 1971, at the age of 81.

== Works ==
- The Blood of the Conquerors (1921) Knopf
- Capitol Hill (1923)
- Women and Wives (1924)
- Hot Saturday (1926)
- Wolf Song (1927)
- In Those Days (1929)
- Footloose McGarnigal (1930)
- Rio Grande (1933)
- Modern Man: His Belief and Behavior (1936)
- The Life of Riley (1937)
- Home in the West (1945)
- People and Power: A Study of Political Behavior in America (1947)
- Grant of Kingdom (1950)
- The Conquest of Don Pedro (1955)

== Bibliography ==
- Robert F. Gish (1988) Frontier's End: The Life and Literature of Harvey Fergusson, University of Nebraska Press OCLC 17104034
- Blanche Christensen Crawford (1951) "Harvey Fergusson, interpreter of the Southwest". ETD Collection for University of Texas, El Paso. OCLC 2209822
