= Max Flatow =

American architect

- Born: August 19, 1915; Port Arthur, Texas
- Died: July 15, 2003; Albuquerque, New Mexico
- Occupation: architect

Max Flatow (August 19, 1915 – July 15, 2003) was an American mid-century modernist architect who worked for most of his career in Albuquerque, New Mexico. Flatow got his start designing buildings for the Manhattan Project in Los Alamos before opening his own firm in Albuquerque in 1947. Joined by Jason Moore in 1948, the firm became one of New Mexico's largest and was instrumental in popularizing modern architecture throughout the state. Some of their most influential commissions included the Simms Building and the University of New Mexico College of Education.

== Biography ==
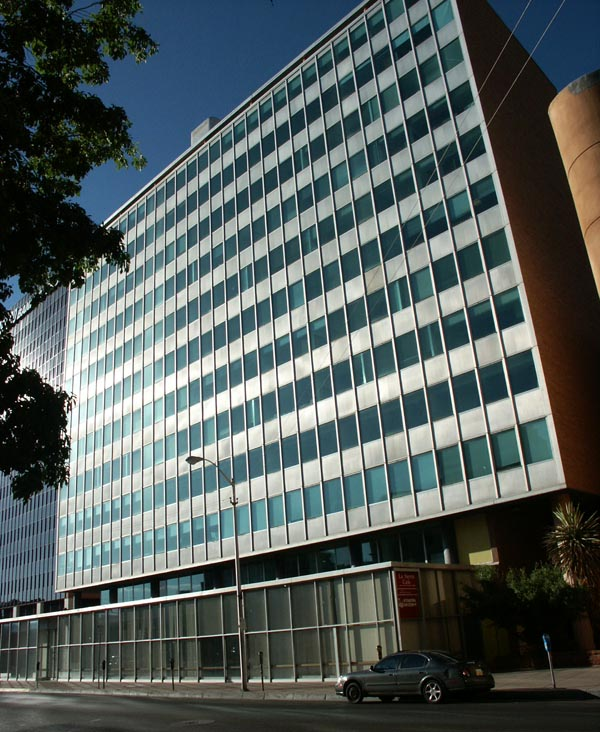
The Simms Building, 1954

Flatow was born in Port Arthur, Texas, the son of Tobias and Alice Jones Flatow, and grew up in an orphanage (Masonic Home and School of Texas) after his father died when he was 5. In 1940, he received his bachelor's degree in architectural engineering from the University of Texas at Austin. During World War II he was a first lieutenant in the Army and worked for the Army Corps of Engineers designing military installations. In 1945, he moved to the secret city of Los Alamos, where, promoted to Captain, he served as Architectural Superintendent of Construction for the Los Alamos Laboratory, reporting to Robert Oppenheimer.

After the war, he ended up staying in New Mexico, opening a small architectural office in Albuquerque in 1947. The following year, his college roommate and friend Jason Moore (1915–2000) joined the firm, becoming a partner in 1952. Flatow and Moore grew to be one of New Mexico's largest architectural firms and played a major role in bringing diversity to the state's architectural styles. According to an Albuquerque Journal career retrospective from 1990, fellow architect George Pearl felt that "Flatow and Moore did more than any other firm to break the tradition of dull, oversimplified Territorial architecture that had prevailed in Albuquerque through the late 1940s."

One of the firm's first big commissions was the Simms Building, which was Albuquerque's first International style high-rise and helped usher the city into the era of modern architecture. The building attracted local and national attention, with Progressive Architecture magazine reporting that "few office buildings that we have seen are more rational, sensibly schemed structurally and mechanically, or more colorful." In recognition of its "exceptional significance", it was listed on the National Register of Historic Places only 42 years after its completion.

Another influential commission was the University of New Mexico College of Education, a complex of six buildings completed in 1963 which "preserved the essence of the campus’s Pueblo Revival style while pushing its boundaries, especially by abstracting and incorporating an eclectic mix of Pueblo and regional influences." According to architectural critic Bainbridge Bunting, "...while it respects and draws inspiration from the traditional architecture of the region, it also accepts modern technology without apologies. And in drawing from both the old and the new, the design avoids crippling compromise and rises, instead, to a new and creative plane which is uniquely appropriate to the particular problems at hand." The complex went on to win a number of awards.

Flatow retired from architecture in 1990 and died in 2003 at the age of 87. He was buried in a Jewish ceremony at Fairview Memorial Park in Albuquerque. His widow, Annie Stein Flatow, died in 2014 at the age of 93.

== Firm ==
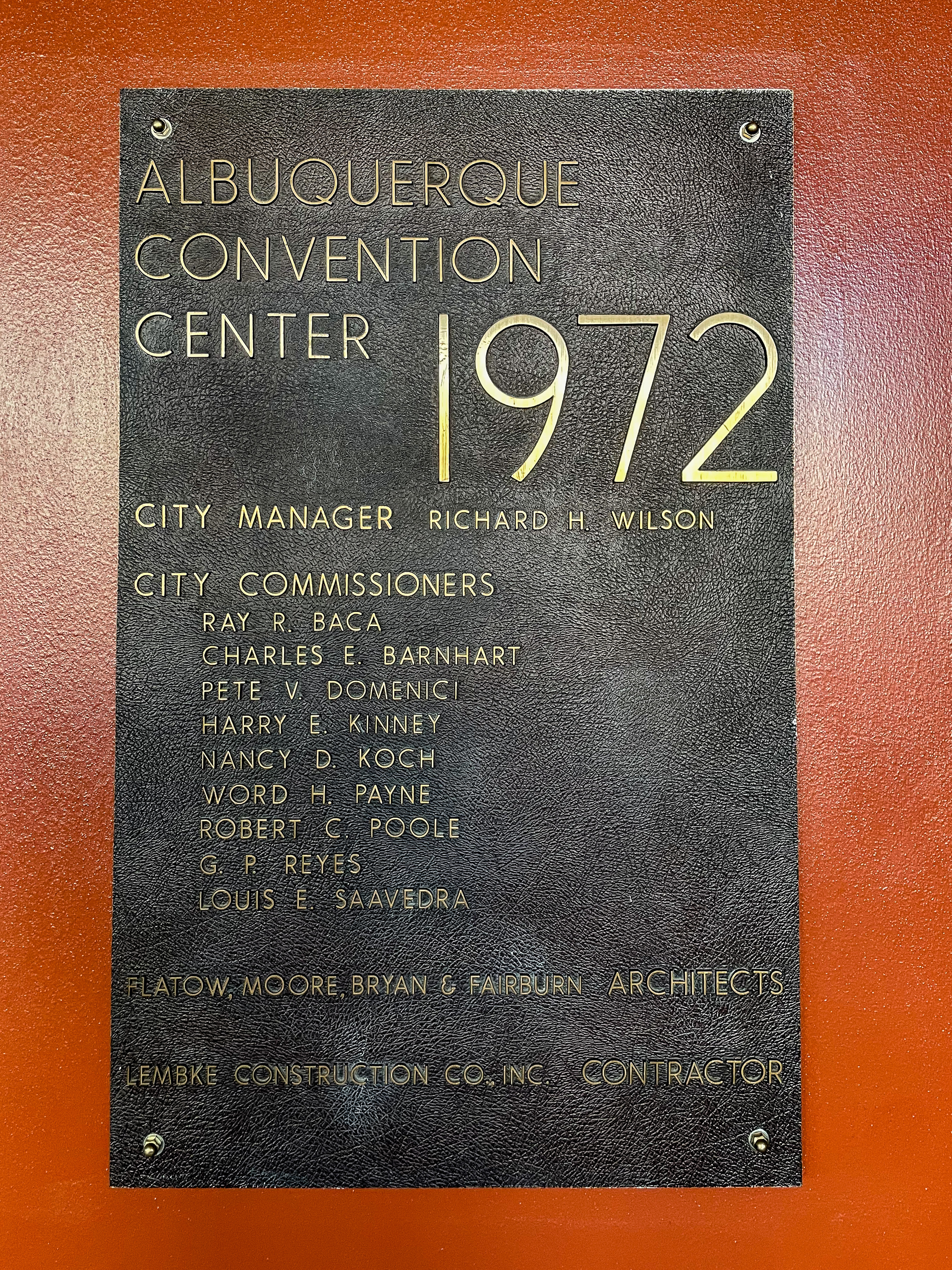
Plaque crediting Flatow, Moore, Bryan & Fairburn as architects of the Albuquerque Convention Center

Flatow opened his first office in 1947 as Max Flatow, Architect. The firm went through a number of iterations over the years as partners joined or left. It became Flatow and Moore in 1952, and then Flatow, Moore, Bryan, and Fairburn in 1954. In the 1970s, Fairburn was put in charge of the firm's Phoenix office which became a separate company in 1974. Subsequently, the original firm became Flatow, Moore, Bryan, and Associates, and then Flatow, Moore, Bryan, Shaffer, and McCabe. Ultimately the firm went by the name Flatow, Moore, Shaffer, and McCabe, and then just FMSM Design Group before closing in 2002.

== Works ==
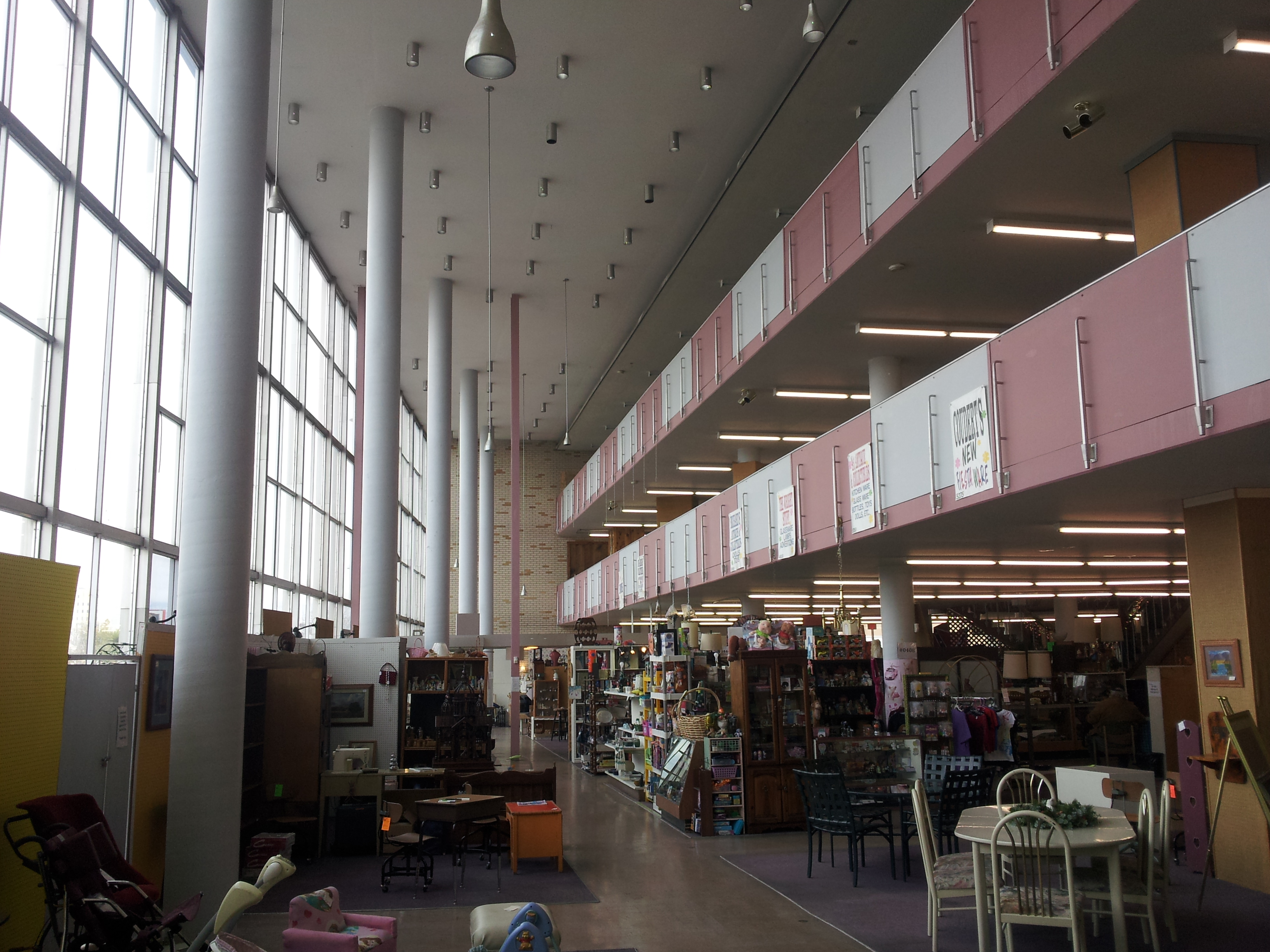
White's Department Store, 1957, interior

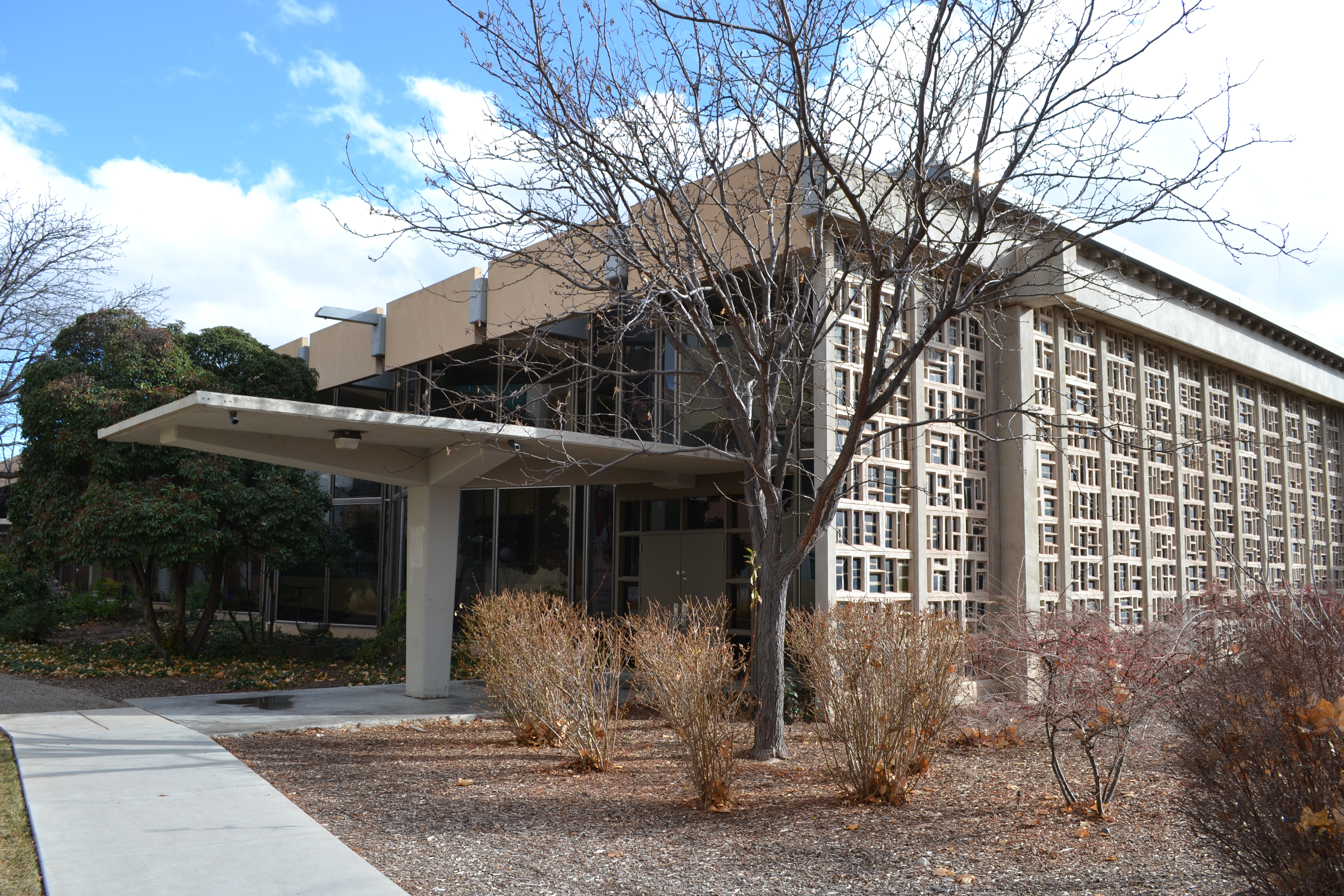
Travelstead Hall, UNM College of Education, 1963

Flatow's firm completed hundreds of commissions. Some of the more notable examples are listed here, including some for which Flatow was not the principal designer. All listings are located in Albuquerque unless otherwise noted.

- Flatow Residence (1950)
- Medical Arts Square (1953)
- Simms Building (1954), NRHP-listed
- Rio Grande Pool (1957)
- White's Department Store (1957)
- Acoma Elementary School (1960)
- Fox Building (1960)
- Grant Middle School (1961)
- Masonic Grand Lodge (1961)
- Phoenix City Square (1962–71), Phoenix, Arizona
- Golden State County Plaza (1963), Fresno, California
- Bank of the West Tower (1963)
- College of Education (1963), University of New Mexico
- Dennis Chavez Federal Building (1965)
- Farris Engineering Center (1968), University of New Mexico
- Albuquerque Sports Stadium (1969), demolished
- Camel Square (1969), Phoenix, Arizona
- Arizona Biltmore Hotel Grand Ballroom (1969), Phoenix, Arizona
- Prudential Plaza (1969–72), Denver, Colorado
- First National Bank of Arizona - Biltmore Branch (1970) Phoenix, Arizona
- Maderina of Scottsdale Apartments (1970), Scottsdale, Arizona (now The Cortesian Apartments)
- St. Paul Lutheran Church (1971)
- Four Seasons Motor Inn (1971)
- Masonic Temple No. 6 and Grand Lodge (1972)
- Albuquerque Convention Center (1972)
- Metrocenter Mall (1973), Phoenix, Arizona (principal architect Robert Fairburn)
- Civic Plaza (1974)
- Pinal General Hospital (1974), Florence, Arizona
- Idaho Falls Office Building (1980), Idaho Falls, Idaho
- Albuquerque Marriott (1982)
- Albuquerque Academy middle school campus (1984)
- Hoffmantown Baptist Church (1985)
