= Solar Building =

- U.S. National Register of Historic Places
- NM State Register of Cultural Properties
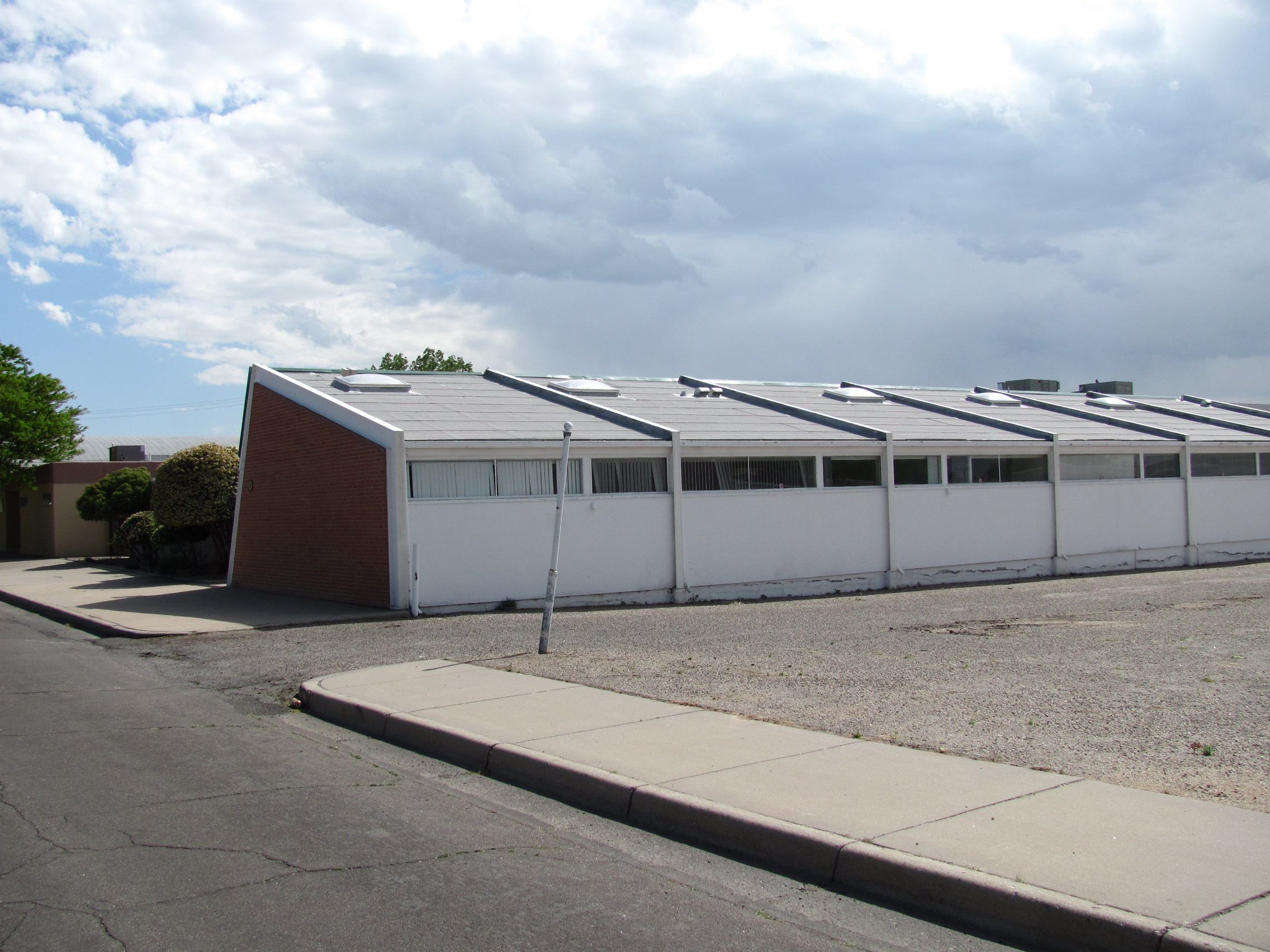
- Solar Building, May 2010
- Location: 213 Truman St. NE, Albuquerque, New Mexico
- Coordinates: 35°04′51″N 106°35′16″W
- Built: 1956
- Architect: Stanley & Wright
- NRHP reference No.: 89001589
- NMSRCP No.: 1171

Significant dates
- Added to NRHP: October 10, 1989
- Designated NMSRCP: May 17, 1985

The Solar Building, located in Albuquerque, New Mexico, was the world's first commercial building to be heated primarily by solar energy. It was built in 1956 to house the engineering firm of Bridgers & Paxton, who were responsible for the heating system design. The novel building received widespread attention, with articles in national publications like Life and Popular Mechanics, and was the subject of a National Science Foundation-funded research project in the 1970s. It was added to the New Mexico State Register of Cultural Properties in 1985 and the National Register of Historic Places in 1989, only 33 years after it was built.

== History ==
The firm of Bridgers & Paxton Consulting Engineers was founded in 1951 by Frank Bridgers (1922–2005) and Donald Paxton (1912–2007), both of whom were interested in the potential applications of solar energy. Initially operating out of a garage behind Bridgers' house, the two men conceived a new office building for their firm which would include an experimental solar heating system. They believed such a system would not only save money, but would also allow them to collect valuable data for future projects. In 1954, they were able to put some of their ideas into practice with an innovative heating and cooling system for the Simms Building, which took advantage of the building's south-facing glass curtain wall to provide solar heating in winter. However, additional heating or cooling was still required under most conditions.

Bridgers and Paxton began serious design work on the Solar Building in early 1954, and it was constructed between March and August 1956. Stanley & Wright were the architects for the building. Its total cost was $58,500, of which the heating and cooling system made up about $15,000—roughly twice the cost of a conventional system. However, Bridgers and Paxton believed the reduced operating costs would save money in the long run. The novel building attracted considerable attention, receiving write-ups in a number of national publications including Architectural Forum, Life, Architectural Record, Progressive Architecture, and Popular Mechanics, and directly inspired a number of subsequent active solar heating systems.

Despite some minor problems, the building's heating system operated successfully for six years, even during the particularly cold and cloudy month of January 1957, which recorded only three sunny days. However, it was not as economical as Bridgers and Paxton had hoped, mainly due to the extremely low cost of fuel at the time. When the building was expanded in 1962, the solar collector was abandoned in favor of a conventional boiler system, though the equipment was left intact for possible future use. This decision paid off just a few years later, when the 1973 oil crisis caused a renewed interest in solar energy and brought fresh attention to the Solar Building. In early 1974, Penn State researcher Stanley Gilman received a National Science Foundation grant to restore the building's solar heating system and operate it as part of a multi-year field study intended to identify optimal design criteria for such systems. Following the conclusion of the project, the solar heating system remained in use.

Bridgers & Paxton eventually outgrew the building, moving to a new location in 1985. The Solar Building was added to the New Mexico State Register of Cultural Properties in 1985 and the National Register of Historic Places in 1989. The building was considered "exceptionally significant", justifying its inclusion in the National Register even though it was only 33 years old at the time.

== Architecture ==
The Solar Building is a one-story, International Style building consisting of two main sections. The north wing, containing the main drafting room as well as the solar heating equipment, made up the main portion of the original building. It has an irregular quadrilateral cross-section with the roof and south wall both angled (at 20 and 30 degrees, respectively) in order to provide a high southern exposure for the solar collectors. The wing is framed by seven structural steel bents, spaced 18 feet (5.5 m) apart and filled in with wooden ceiling joists and masonry. The north wall has a narrow, continuous band of windows running just below the roofline which light the drafting room, while the street-facing eastern elevation is windowless brick. The south wing is a low, flat-roofed structure containing office space. It is partially faced with brick, marking the original extent of the building; it was later extended with an addition in 1962. The main entrance is positioned at the intersection of the two wings.

== Heating system ==
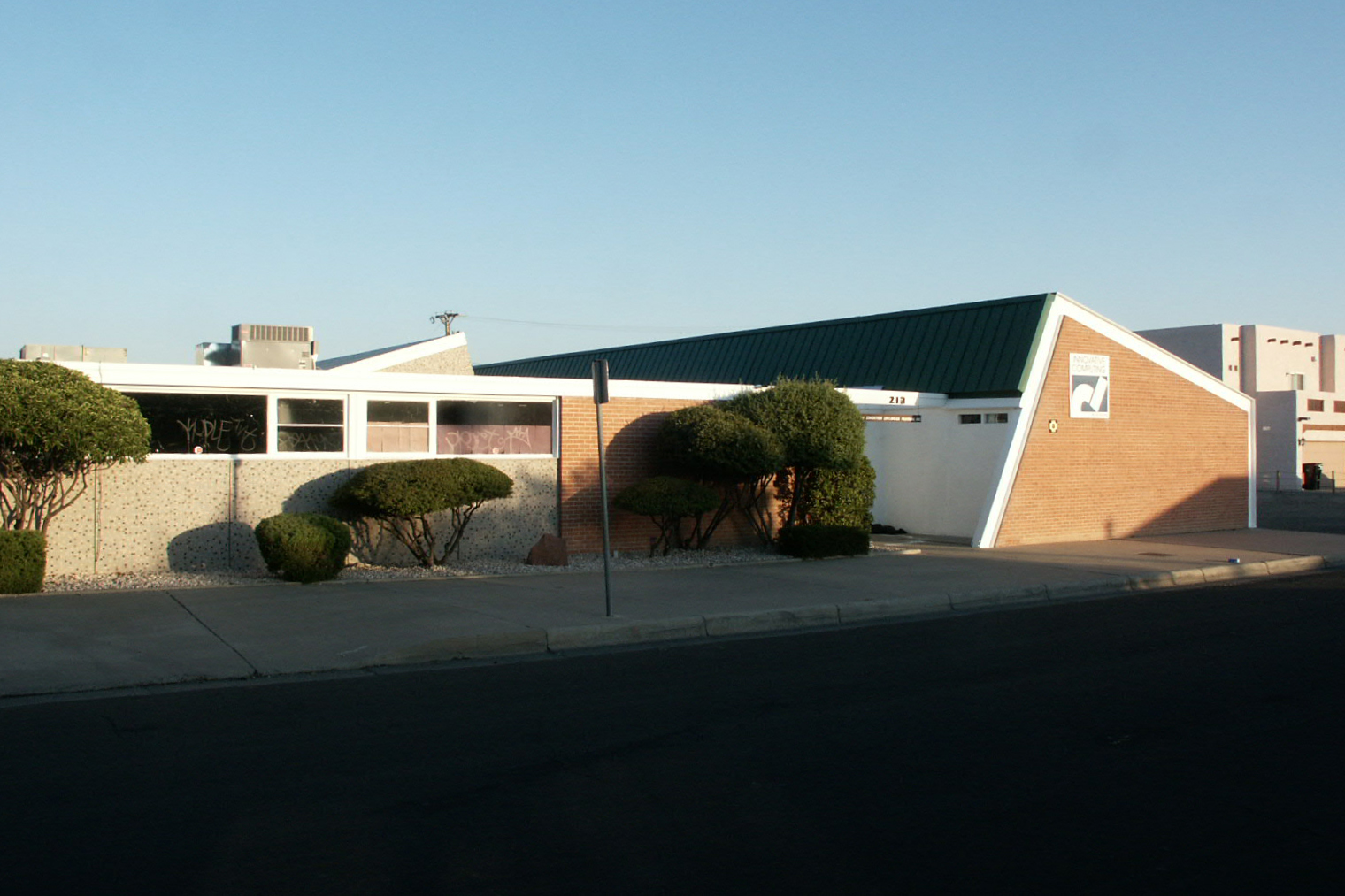
The Truman St. elevation of the building, showing the location of the solar collectors (now covered)

The building's active solar heating system employed an array of 56 solar thermal collectors with a total area of 800 square feet (74 m^{2}). The array was positioned on a south-facing exterior wall which was angled at 30 degrees to the vertical in order to catch the maximum amount of winter sunlight. The collectors were custom-fabricated aluminum panels with built-in flow channels for water to pass through. The surface of each collector was coated with low-reflectivity black paint and a layer of glass to capture the maximum amount of thermal energy.

In sunny weather, water passing through the collectors would reach a maximum temperature of 140 °F (60 °C) before being deposited in a 6,000-gallon insulated underground tank which provided a hot water reserve for up to three days of cloudy weather. Under normal conditions (about 90% of an average heating season), the water in the tank would be warm enough to directly heat the building by circulating it through radiant panels in the floor and ceiling. If the temperature in the tank dropped due to prolonged cloudy weather, a heat pump could be employed to maintain the hot water supply to the panels. The heat pump was a standard commercial water chiller unit, but with heating rather than cooling as its intended purpose—chilling the water in the tank and delivering the "waste" heat to the hot water stream. The heat pump could continue to function as long as the tank temperature remained above 35 °F (2 °C).

In summer, the system could also provide cooling by circulating cold water through the building rather than hot water. In this mode, the storage tank became a reservoir for cold water, which allowed the system to save energy in milder weather by storing heat during the day and releasing it at night when the outside temperatures were lower. Most of the time, the water in the tank could be kept cool using only an evaporative cooler. If the water in the tank got too warm, the heat pump would go back into operation in order to continue transferring heat from the cold water stream into the tank. It was also possible to operate in cooling mode during the day while storing hot water from the solar collectors and heat pump to heat the building at night.

Minor changes were made to the system during its operational life. One of the first problems that arose was corrosion of the collector panels, which originally had integral flow channels formed from two bonded sheets of aluminum. After leaks started to develop, the flow channels were replaced with copper tubing attached to the back of the panels. Gilman made additional modifications to the system in the 1970s, including changing the working fluid in the collector loop to ethylene glycol (in order to prevent freezing) and re-soldering the collector panels for better thermal contact. Gilman also installed an automated control system and upgraded the air handling equipment to allow individual temperature control for each office. Despite the modifications, the system remains mostly intact as originally designed.

== See also ==
- List of pioneering solar buildings
