= Simms Building =

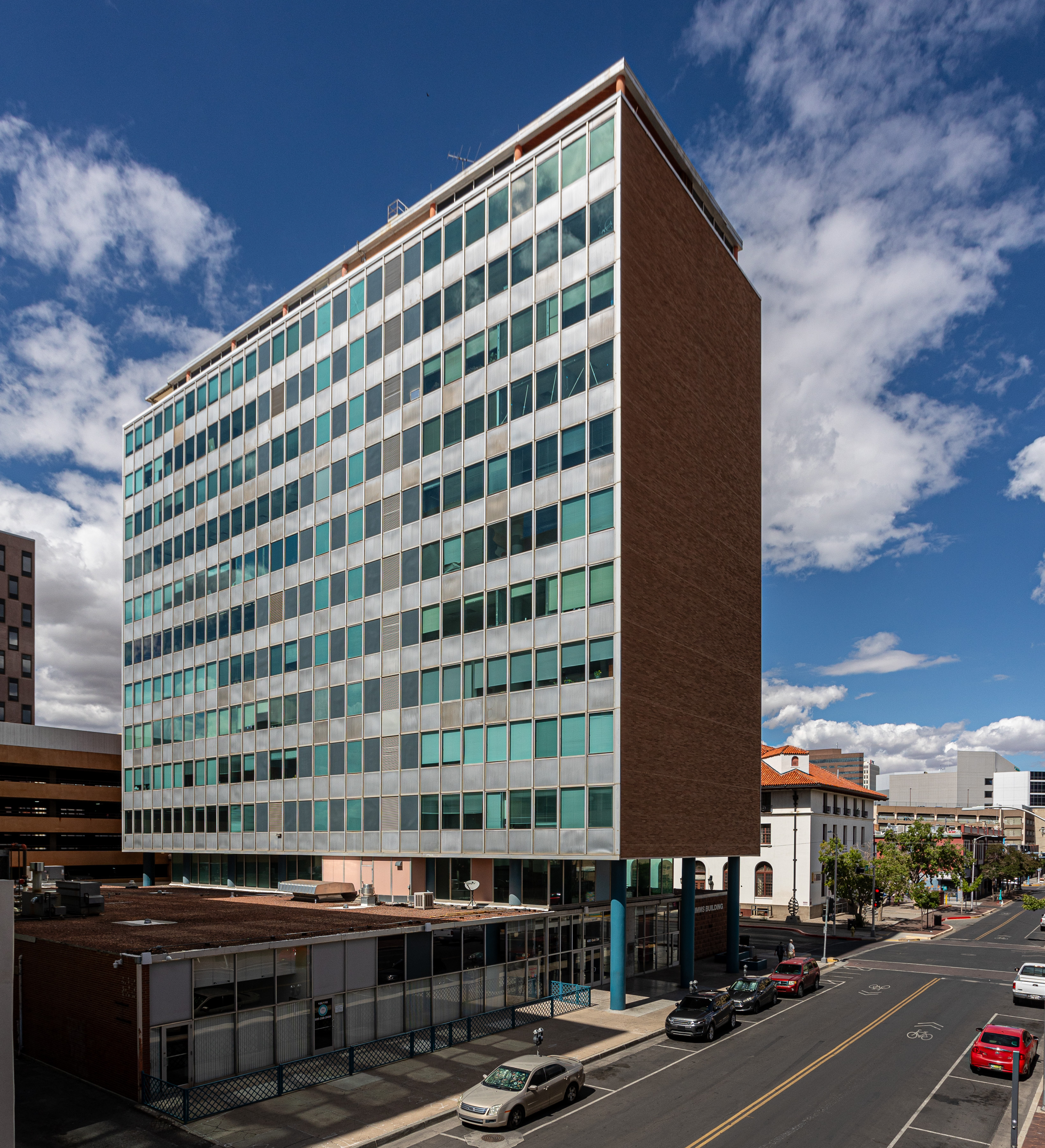
- Interactive map of the Simms Building area
- Alternative names: Sandia Savings Bank Building

General information
- Type: Commercial offices
- Architectural style: International style
- Location: 400 Gold Avenue SW; Albuquerque, New Mexico
- Coordinates: 35.0830°N 106.6521°W
- Completed: 1954
- Cost: $2,000,000

Height
- Roof: 54.86 m (180.0 ft)

Technical details
- Floor count: 13
- Floor area: 114,000 sq ft (10,600 m^{2})

Design and construction
- Architect: Flatow and Moore
- Main contractor: Lembke-Clough and King
- Simms Building
- U.S. National Register of Historic Places
- NM State Register of Cultural Properties
- NRHP reference No.: 97001653
- NMSRCP No.: 1693

Significant dates
- Added to NRHP: February 2, 1998
- Designated NMSRCP: November 21, 1997

The Simms Building is a historic high-rise office building in downtown Albuquerque, New Mexico. Designed by Flatow and Moore and completed in 1954, it was the city's first large-scale modernist building and is regarded as "Albuquerque’s best example of the International Style". The building was added to the New Mexico State Register of Cultural Properties in 1997 and the National Register of Historic Places in 1998, only 44 years after it was completed.

At 180 feet (55 m) in height, the 13-story building was the tallest in New Mexico until the Bank of New Mexico Building was completed across the street in 1961. Its design was inspired by the latest trends in modern architecture, especially the Lever House in New York City, with glass curtain walls and a combination of vertical and horizontal volumes. Sandstone blocks from the previous building on the site, the Commercial Club, were included in the exterior walls. The Simms Building also included an innovative radiant heating and cooling system with limited solar heating capabilities. The building received attention nationally as well as locally and helped catalyze the modern architecture movement in New Mexico.

== History ==
The Simms Building was commissioned in 1952 by banker and former Congressman Albert G. Simms, who had owned the old Commercial Club building on the site since 1932. To design the building, he hired Max Flatow and Jason Moore, whose recently established firm Flatow and Moore would become one of the largest in New Mexico. In fact, the Simms Building was their first major project as partners. Simms initially planned to build a four- or five-story building, but when the architects showed him a more ambitious 12-story proposal he decided to go ahead with the project even though he felt it was a "crazy idea".

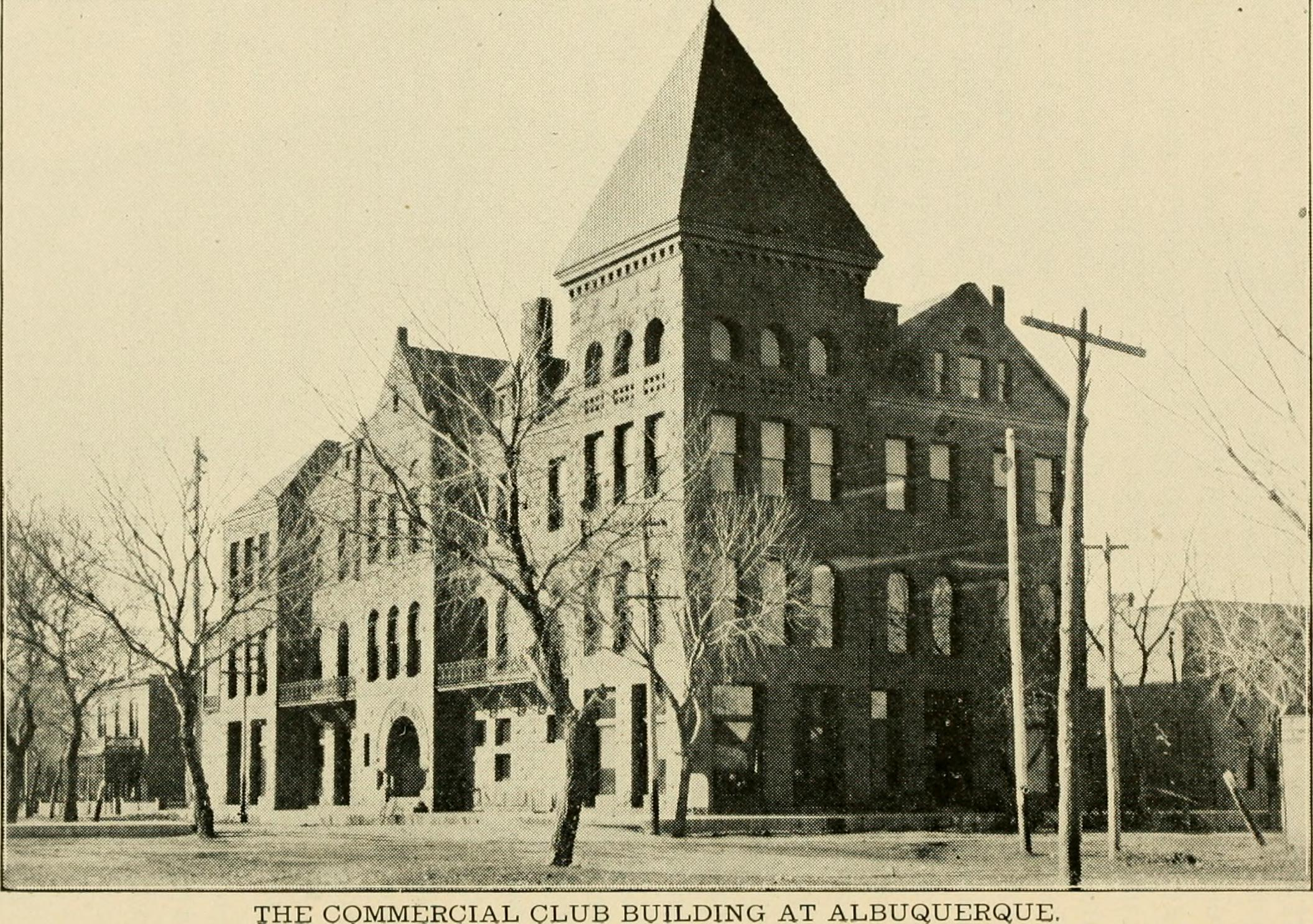
The Simms Building replaced the Richardsonian Romanesque Commercial Club, built in 1892. Some of the sandstone blocks were reused in the new building.

Flatow and Moore designed a bold International style tower, reflecting the latest trends in modern architecture; the style had only recently been adapted to highrise buildings like the Lake Shore Drive Apartments (1951) and United Nations Building (1952). Their design drew particular inspiration from the Lever House in New York City, especially the glass curtain walls and the way the tower seemed to float above its horizontal base. While embracing a futuristic design, the architects also chose to keep a link to the past by reusing sandstone blocks from the Commercial Club in some of the ground-floor exterior walls. The Simms Building was intended to be a symbol of progress and modernity for the growing city of Albuquerque.

Construction on the building started in September 1952 and was finished just over two years later in November 1954. The original construction cost was about $2 million. The general contractor was Lembke-Clough and King of Albuquerque. The new building was the tallest in New Mexico, surpassing the First National Bank Building, and boasted novel features like the first use of Thermopane insulating glass in the southwest and an innovative radiant panel heating and cooling system. The Simms Building attracted notice both locally and nationally—it was featured in its own issue of Albuquerque Progress, a monthly journal published by Albuquerque National Bank, and it was written up in the national publications Progressive Architecture in 1955 (with photos by Julius Shulman) and Architectural Forum in 1957. According to the Progressive Architecture piece,

It is a strange fact that in the smaller cities generally, distinguished commercial architecture seldom appears. An outstanding exception is the Simms Building, in Albuquerque... Indeed, few office buildings that we have seen are more rational, sensibly schemed structurally and mechanically, or more colorful.

The building was sold to Sandia Savings and Loan Association in 1973 for $1.75 million and was renamed Sandia Savings Building, though the Simms name persisted in local usage. Sandia Savings made a number of changes to the building, enclosing the open-air promenade on the 13th floor for more office space, expanding the ground-level retail area, and adding a multilevel parking garage. The projects added about 19,000 square feet (1,800 m^{2}) of space and cost $1.6 million. In 1993 it was given minor renovations and the official name was changed to Simms Tower. Peterson Properties purchased the Simms Building in 2013 https://albuquerquemodernism.unm.edu/posts/cs22_simms_building.html. A more thorough, $7 million renovation was completed in 2014, including upgrades to the plumbing, electrical, and HVAC systems while maintaining the building's historic character.

The building was added to the New Mexico State Register of Cultural Properties in 1997 and the National Register of Historic Places in 1998. The building was considered "exceptionally significant", justifying its inclusion even though it was only 44 years old at the time.

== Architecture ==
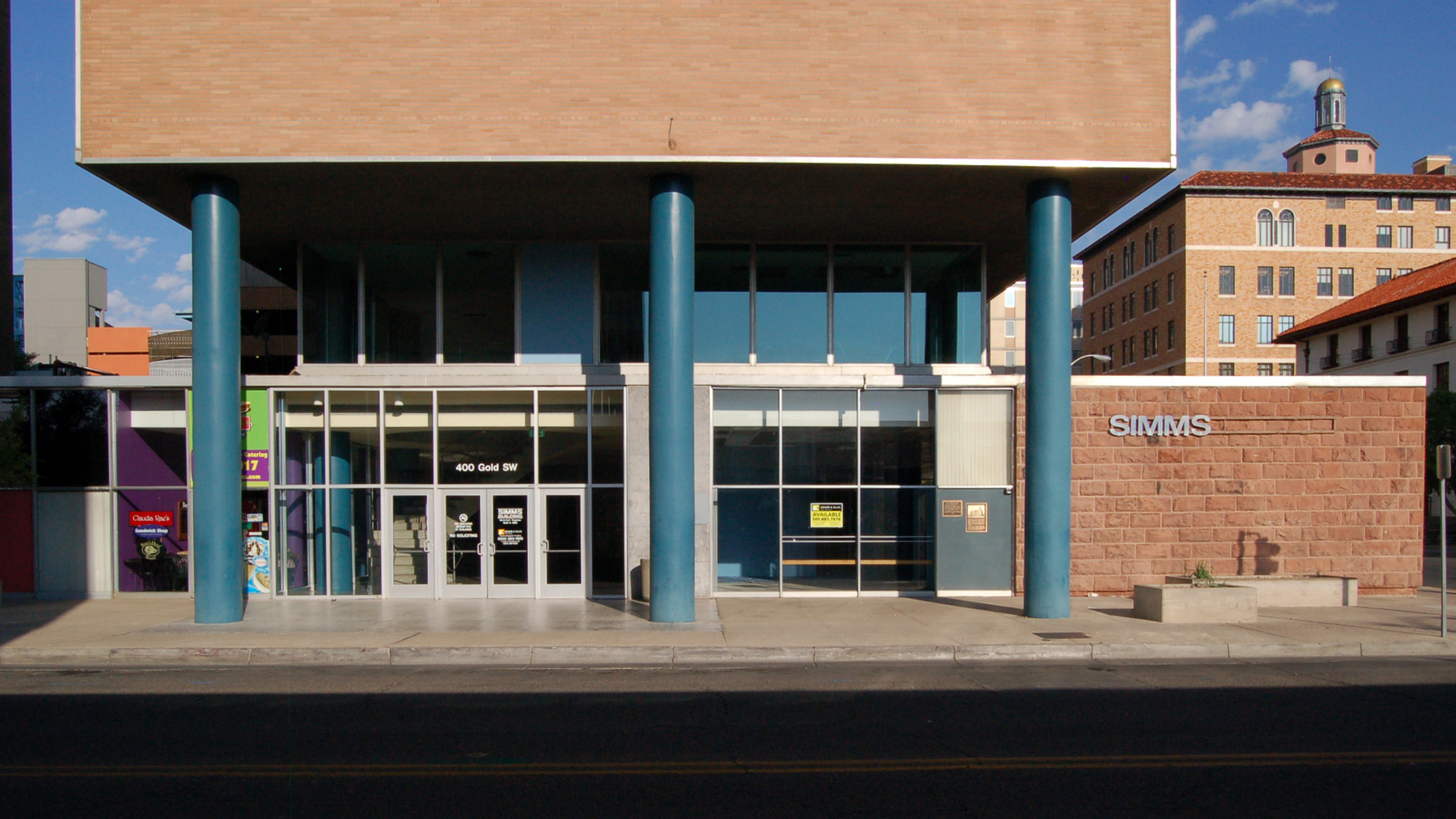
The entrance of the Simms Building, including a section of wall built from reused sandstone from the Commercial Club

Designed by the firm of Flatow and Moore, the Simms Building was one of the first International style buildings in Albuquerque (one earlier example, albeit on a much smaller scale, is John Gaw Meem's Southern Union Gas Company Building built in 1951). The building is 180 feet (55 m) tall and has 13 floors supported by a reinforced concrete frame with 24 columns in a 3-by-8 grid. The ground floor covers most of the block and includes a small courtyard on the north side; most of the exterior walls are aluminum-framed glass but some portions use the recycled sandstone from the Commercial Club. The second story is recessed flush with the structural columns and again mostly glass. Above this is the main ten-story block of the building, faced with a steel-framed curtain wall of Thermopane glass and aluminum panels on the north and south sides, and brick over structural clay tile on the windowless east and west sides. It projects over the ground floor to form covered arcades at the east and west ends, with three columns on each side exposed as pilotis. The recessed thirteenth floor is modeled after the first floor and was added in the 1970s by enclosing the open promenade that originally topped the building.

As Albuquerque's first modernist highrise, the building's architecture was very influential locally. For instance, the nearby New Mexico Bank & Trust Building has a very similar design, and many other buildings in the city were inspired either directly or indirectly by the Simms Building.

== Mechanical system ==
Upon opening in 1954, the Simms Building had an innovative heating and cooling system designed by the engineering firm of Bridgers and Paxton. During normal operation, groundwater from onsite deep wells, available at 67 °F (19 °C) year-round, was heated or cooled as needed using a heat pump and then circulated through radiant panels built into the exterior curtain walls. In winter, the system could also take advantage of solar heating, in effect using the building's sunny southern side as a giant solar collector which could then provide heat to the northern side. At times, the heating and cooling loads were balanced so that the system could operate self-sufficiently on solar energy alone. This idea was developed further in the all-solar heating system Bridgers and Paxton designed two years later for their pioneering Solar Building.

While the system was efficient, it was not without problems. The fact that spent water from the system was re-deposited in the ground after use meant that additives could not be used without contaminating the groundwater, and corrosion soon became an issue. Eventually, it was converted to a closed system in 1965. Afterwards, the system was not properly maintained and stopped working in the 1970s. It was ultimately replaced with conventional heating and cooling systems, somewhat ironically just as the original design was attracting renewed attention due to the 1970s energy crisis.

== In popular culture ==
The Simms Building appeared frequently in the popular AMC series Breaking Bad, where it portrayed the DEA office of character Agent Hank Schrader.
