= List of museums in New Mexico =

This list of museums in New Mexico is a list of museums, defined for this context as institutions (including nonprofit organizations, government entities, and private businesses) that collect and care for objects of cultural, artistic, scientific, or historical interest and make their collections or related exhibits available for public viewing. Museums that exist only in cyberspace (i.e., virtual museums) are not included.

== The list ==
Name	Image	Town/City	County	Region	Type	Summary
A:shiwi A:wan Museum and Heritage Center		Zuni Pueblo	McKinley	Northwest	Native American	Heritage of the Zuni
Alamogordo Museum of History		Alamogordo	Otero	Southeast	Local history	Formerly the Tularosa Basin Historical Society Museum
Albuquerque Museum of Art and History		Albuquerque	Bernalillo	Central New Mexico	Art, Local history	Art of the Southwest and over 400 years of Albuquerque history
American International Rattlesnake Museum		Albuquerque	Bernalillo	Central New Mexico	Natural history	Live snakes, snake art, exhibits and memorabilia
Anderson-Abruzzo Albuquerque International Balloon Museum		Albuquerque	Bernalillo	Central New Mexico	Aerospace	History, science, and art of ballooning and other lighter than air flight
Amistad Museum		Amistad	Union	Northeast	Local history	
Anderson Museum of Contemporary Art		Roswell	Chaves	Southeast	Art	website
ASRT Museum and Archives		Albuquerque	Bernalillo	Central New Mexico	Radiologic technology	website, history of medical imaging and radiation therapy
Artesia Historical Museum & Art Center		Artesia	Eddy	Southeast	Multiple	website, exhibits include Native American artifacts, period kitchen, children's items, farm & ranch display, oil & gas industry, art exhibits
Aztec Mill Museum		Cimarron	Colfax	Northeast	Mill	Mid 19th-century grist mill
Aztec Museum & Pioneer Village		Aztec	San Juan	Northwest	Open air	website
Aztec Ruins National Monument		Aztec	San Juan	Northwest	Archaeology	Visitor center museum features exhibits about the ruins of several ancestral Pueblo structures
Bandelier National Monument		White Rock	Los Alamos	North Central	Native American	Ancestral pueblo homes, kivas (ceremonial structures), rock paintings and petroglyphs, and museum with ancestral Pueblo artifacts, contemporary Pueblo pottery, CCC woodwork and tinwork
Billy the Kid Museum		Fort Sumner	De Baca	Southeast	Biographical	website, memorabilia from Western outlaw Billy the Kid, firearms and antique automobiles
Black Range Museum		Hillsboro	Sierra	Southwest	Local history	
Blackwater Draw Museum & Archaeological Site		Portales	Roosevelt	Southeast	Archaeology	Operated by the Eastern New Mexico University, artifacts and exhibits associated with the Blackwater Draw, the type site of the Clovis culture
Bolack Electromechanical Museum		Farmington	San Juan	Northwest	Technology	website, located at B-Square Ranch, includes antique electrical, radio, communication, industrial and agricultural artifacts
Bolack Museum of Fish & Wildlife		Farmington	San Juan	Northwest	Natural history	website, located at B-Square Ranch, wildlife mounts in dioramas from 5 continents
Bond House Museum		Espanola	Rio Arriba	North Central	Local history	website
Bosque Redondo Memorial		Fort Sumner	De Baca		History	History of Fort Sumner and the Bosque Redondo Indian Reservation
Boy Scout Museum & Westward Ho Trading Post		Raton	Union	Northeast	Scouting	
Bradbury Science Museum		Los Alamos	Los Alamos	North Central	Science	History and science work done at the Los Alamos National Laboratory
Branigan Cultural Center		Las Cruces	Doña Ana	Southwest	Local history	website, local history exhibit and changing cultural exhibits
Capulin Volcano National Monument		Raton	Union	Northeast	Natural history	Visitor center features exhibits about the volcano and the area's geology, natural and cultural history
Carlsbad Caverns National Park		Carlsbad	Eddy	Southeast	Natural history	Visitor center exhibits include bats, geology, area history, Lechuguilla Cave
Carlsbad Museum & Art Center		Carlsbad	Eddy	Southeast	Multiple	website, includes local and regional history, Native American art and artifacts, and modern, contemporary and Southwestern art
Casa San Ysidro		Corrales	Sandoval	Central New Mexico	Historic house	Operated by the Albuquerque Museum, recreation of a 19th-century rancho
Cerrillos Turquoise Mining Museum		Cerrillos	Santa Fe	North Central	Local history	website, exhibits include mining equipment, rocks, bottles, tools, insulator, coffee can, hand grinders & antique collections
Chaco Culture National Historical Park		Farmington	San Juan	Northwest	Native American	Archaeology artifacts from the ruins
Chase Ranch		Cimarron	Colfax	Northeast	Historic House	1860 ranch house on the historic Chase Ranch, operated in partnership with Philmont Scout Ranch and the Boy Scouts of America. Website
Chimayo Museum		Chimayo	Rio Arriba	North Central	Local history	
City of Las Vegas Museum		Las Vegas	San Miguel	Northeast	Local history	website, photos, exhibits include local history, Santa Fe Trail and the Rough Riders
Cleveland Roller Mill Museum		Mora	Mora	Northeast	Local history	website, 3 story, adobe water-powered flour mill with exhibits on local history
Columbus Historical Museum		Columbus	Luna	Southwest	Local history	website, operated by the Columbus Historical Society in a historic depot
Corona Museum		Corona, New Mexico	Lincoln County, New Mexico	Southeast	Local History Museum	
Coronado State Monument		Bernalillo	Sandoval	Southeast	History	Features reconstructed kiva ruins, prehistoric and historic Indian and Spanish colonial artifacts
Couse/Sharp Historic Site		Taos	Taos	North Central	Historic house	House of artist E. Irving Couse
Cumbres and Toltec Scenic Railroad		Chama	Rio Arriba	North Central	Railroad	Heritage railroad with rolling stock on display
Deming Luna Mimbres Museum		Deming	Luna	Southwest	Multiple	Exhibits include Mimbres pottery, rocks and geodes, dolls and toys, ceramics and glass items, war memorabilia, period store front displays, farming and ranching displays, local history, local collections
E3 Children's Museum & Science Center		Farmington	San Juan	Northwest	Children's	website
Dr. Anthony “Tony” Gennaro Natural History Museum		Portales	Roosevelt	Southeast	Natural history	website, exhibits and live plants and animals of eastern New Mexico and the greater Southwest, prt of Eastern New Mexico University
El Camino Real Historic Trail Site		Socorro	Socorro	Southwest	History	History and heritage of the people who traveled along the El Camino Real trail in the 18th century
Elizabethtown Museum		Elizabethtown	Colfax	Northeast	Local history	Late 19th century mining ghost town
El Morro National Monument		Ramah	Cibola	Northwest	Natural history	Visitor center features exhibits about the cultural and natural history of El Morro
El Rancho de las Golondrinas		Santa Fe	Santa Fe	North Central	Living	Recreated 18th century Spanish Colonial ranch
El Rincon Trading Post		Taos	Taos	North Central	Native American	Store with museum display of Native American and Western artifacts
Ernest L. Blumenschein Home & Museum		Taos	Taos	North Central	Historic house	House of artist Ernest L. Blumenschein
Ernie Pyle House/Library		Albuquerque	Bernalillo	Central New Mexico	Biographical	Home of reporter Ernie Pyle, now a branch library with Pyle memorabilia and a monument to Pyle
Explora		Albuquerque	Bernalillo	Central New Mexico	Science	Science museum with interactive exhibits for everyone
Farmington Museum		Farmington	San Juan	Northwest	Local history	website
Folsom Museum		Folsom	Union	Northeast	Local history	website, exhibits include the Folsom site, African American cowboy George McJunkin, train robber Black Jack Ketchum, law office and general store displays
Fort Selden State Monument		Las Cruces	Doña Ana	Southwest	Military	Ruins of the mid 19th century Army post with exhibits on frontier and military life
Fort Stanton State Monument		Fort Stanton	Lincoln	Southeast	Military	Mid 19th century military fort
Fort Union National Monument		Watrous	Mora	Northeast	Military	Ruins of three forts and visitor center with exhibits, seasonal living history programs
Florence Hawley Ellis Museum of Anthropology		Abiquiú	Rio Arriba	North Central	Anthropology	website, part of Ghost Ranch
Gadsden Museum		Mesilla	Doña Ana	Southwest	Local history	website
Gallup Cultural Center		Gallup	McKinley	Northwest	Native American	Native American art and culture, trains, weaving, sandpainting, Historic Route 66, silversmithing, operated by the Southwest Indian Foundation
Georgia O'Keeffe Home and Studio		Abiquiú	Rio Arriba	North Central	Historic house	Tours operated by the Georgia O'Keeffe Museum
Georgia O'Keeffe Museum		Santa Fe	Santa Fe	North Central	Art	Works by artist Georgia O'Keeffe
Geronimo Springs Museum		Truth or Consequences	Sierra	Southwest	Local history	website, natural and cultural history of Sierra County, includes fossils, Apache artifacts, Hispanic heritage, ranching, mining, Mimbres and Tularosa pottery, frontier history, military displays
Gila Cliff Dwellings National Monument		Silver City	Grant	Southwest	Archaeology	533-acre (2.16 km2) national monument with ruins of interlinked cave dwellings built in five cliff alcoves by the Mogollon peoples, visitor center and museum of Apache and Mogollon artifacts
Governor Bent House and Museum		Taos	Taos	North Central	Historic house	Home of New Mexico's first governor, also features gallery of Western art
Grandma's Trading Post and Museum		Truchas	Rio Arriba	North Central	Local history	
Haa'ku Museum		Acoma Pueblo	Cibola	Northwest	Native American	website, history, art and customs of the Acoma
Hacienda de los Martinez		Taos	Taos	North Central	Historic house	1804 Spanish Colonial adobe great house
Hamilton Military Museum		Truth or Consequences	Sierra	Southwest	Military	website, located next to Veteran's Memorial Park, military artifacts including a military button collection and Buffalo Soldier memorabilia
Harvey House Museum		Belen	Valencia	Central New Mexico	Multiple	website, operated by the City of Belen, includes history of the Fred Harvey Chain, Harvey Girls and Harvey Houses, Santa Fe Railway, history of Belen and Valencia County, home of the Belen Model Railroad Club, and year-round cultural and art exhibits
Harwood Museum of Art		Taos	Taos	North Central	Art	Historic and contemporary art and culture of the Taos region
Herzstein Memorial Museum		Clayton	Union	Northeast	Local history	website, operated by the Union County Historical Society
Historical Center for Southeast New Mexico Museum		Roswell	Chaves	Southeast	Historic house	website, 1912 home with first floor furnished for the period, second floor with local history displays
Hubbard Museum of the American West		Ruidoso Downs	Lincoln	Southeast	Multiple	website, local and regional arts, history and culture, collection includes horse gear from around the world, and carriages, wagons and horse-drawn vehicles spanning hundreds of years
Indian Pueblo Cultural Center		Albuquerque	Bernalillo	Central New Mexico	Native American	Pueblo Indian history, culture and art
Institute of American Indian Arts		Santa Fe	Santa Fe	North Central	Art	Contemporary Native American fine art
International UFO Museum And Research Center		Roswell	Chaves	Southeast	Science	Exhibits about the Roswell incident, crop circles, UFO sightings, Area 51, ancient astronauts and abductions
Jemez State Monument		Jemez Springs	Sandoval	Northwest	History	Pueblo ruins and visitor center
Jicarilla Arts and Crafts Shop Museum		Dulce	Rio Arriba	Northwest	Native American	Basketry, beadwork, paintings, leatherwork, and other arts and crafts
Kit Carson Home & Museum		Taos	Taos	North Central	Historic house	House of frontiersman Kit Carson
Kit Carson Museum		Rayado	Colfax	Northeast	Living	website, presents 1850s frontier life and history of Kit Carson, operated by the Philmont Scout Ranch
Klipsch Museum		Las Cruces	Doña Ana	Southwest	Technology	website, part of New Mexico State University, memorabilia of inventor Paul W. Klipsch including antique audio equipment
Las Cruces Museum of Art		Las Cruces	Doña Ana	Southwest	Art	website, changing contemporary art exhibits
Las Cruces Museum of Nature and Science		Las Cruces	Doña Ana	Southwest	Natural history	website, natural history, science and the environment of New Mexico and the Chihuahuan Desert
Las Cruces Railroad Museum		Las Cruces	Doña Ana	Southwest	Railroad	website, railroad history of Las Cruces and the impact of the railroad on Southern New Mexico
Lea County Museum		Lovington	Lea	Southeast	Open air	website, complex include a 1918 hotel, 1908 Love House, 1914 school, store and post office, dugout, 1950 Reed House
Lincoln State Monument		Lincoln	Lincoln	Southeast	Open air	Western town with 17 historic structures, 6 open as museums
Lordsburg Hidalgo County Museum		Lordsburg	Hidalgo	Southwest	Local history	
Loretto Chapel		Santa Fe	Santa Fe	North Central	Religious	Former late 19th century Roman Catholic church with helix shaped spiral staircase
Los Alamos Historical Museum		Los Alamos	Los Alamos	North Central	Local history	
Los Lunas Museum of Heritage and Arts		Los Lunas	Valencia	Central New Mexico	Multiple	website, local history and art, branch of the Los Lunas Public Library
Maxwell Museum of Anthropology		Albuquerque	Bernalillo	Central New Mexico	Anthropology	Prehistoric history of the Southwest, early humans, and other anthropology exhibits
McBride Museum		Roswell	Chaves	Southeast	Military	website, part of New Mexico Military Institute, history of NMMI and its alumni in war and peace
Mesalands Community College Dinosaur Museum and Natural Sciences Laboratory		Tucumcari	Quay	Northeast	Natural history	website, part of the Mesalands Community College, replicated and original fossils of the Mesozoic period
Meteorite Museum		Albuquerque	Bernalillo	Central New Mexico	Natural history	website, part of the University of New Mexico, located in Northrop Hall
Miles Mineral Museum		Portales	Roosevelt	Southeast	Geology	website, part of Eastern New Mexico University,
Millicent Rogers Museum		Taos	Taos	North Central	Art	Art and culture of historic and contemporary Northern New Mexico
Moriarty Historical Society and Museum		Moriarty	Torrance	Central New Mexico	Local history	website
Museum of Indian Arts and Culture		Santa Fe	Santa Fe	North Central	Native American	Art and culture of southwestern Native Americans
Museum of International Folk Art		Santa Fe	Santa Fe	North Central	Art	Includes folk art, popular art, toys, ceramics, carvings and textiles from more than 100 nations
Museum of New Mexico		Santa Fe	Santa Fe	North Central	Multiple	Includes five separate state-run museums: New Mexico Museum of Art, Palace of the Governors, Museum of Indian Arts and Culture, Museum of International Folk Art, New Mexico History Museum; also six separate New Mexico State Monuments
Museum of Southwestern Biology		Albuquerque	Bernalillo	Central New Mexico	Natural history	Part of the University of New Mexico, open by appointment, research and teaching facility, collections include arthropods, amphibians and reptiles, birds, fishes, genomic resources, herbarium, mammals and parasites
Museum of Spanish Colonial Art		Santa Fe	Santa Fe	North Central	Art	website, Hispano art forms, operated by the Spanish Colonial Arts Society
Museum of the American Military Family		Tijeras	Bernalillo	Central New Mexico	Military	website
National Hispanic Cultural Center		Albuquerque	Bernalillo	Central New Mexico	Art	Art and culture from Hispanic communities
National Museum of Nuclear Science & History		Albuquerque	Bernalillo	Central New Mexico	Science	Scientific, historic, and cultural aspects of the Atomic Age, formerly the National Atomic Museum
National Scouting Museum		Cimarron	Colfax	Northeast	History	Exhibits on the history of the Boy Scouts of America, as well as local history, art, and natural history, operated by Philmont Scout Ranch. Website
New Mexico Mineral Museum, New Mexico Bureau of Geology & Mineral Resources		Socorro	Socorro	Southwest	Geology	website, located at the New Mexico Institute of Mining and Technology
New Mexico Farm and Ranch Heritage Museum		Las Cruces	Doña Ana	Southwest	Agriculture	State’s 3,000-year history of farming and ranching
New Mexico History Museum		Santa Fe	Santa Fe	North Central	History	
New Mexico Holocaust & Intolerance Museum		Albuquerque	Bernalillo	Central New Mexico	Holocaust	History of the Holocaust, genocides and forms of bullying that have affected people around the world
New Mexico Military Museum		Santa Fe	Santa Fe	North Central	Military	Exhibits stories, artifacts, and artwork associated with New Mexico's military history. Website
New Mexico Mining Museum		Grants	Cibola	Northwest	Mining	Mining
New Mexico Museum of Art		Santa Fe	Santa Fe	North Central	Art	Fine art
New Mexico Museum of Natural History and Science		Albuquerque	Bernalillo	Central New Mexico	Natural history	Fossils and geology, astronomy, personal computer history
New Mexico Museum of Space History		Alamogordo	Otero	Southeast	Aerospace	Displays related to space flight and the space age, includes the International Space Hall of Fame
New Mexico School for the Deaf Museum		Santa Fe	Santa Fe	North Central	Education	History of over 100 years of education at the New Mexico School for the Deaf
New Mexico Ski Museum and Hall of Fame		Albuquerque	Bernalillo	Central New Mexico	Sports	website, located at the base of the Sandia Peak Aerial Tramway, history of snow skiing in New Mexico
New Mexico State University Art Gallery		Las Cruces	Doña Ana	Southwest	Art	part of New Mexico State University, contemporary visual arts in the border region
New Mexico State University Arthropod Museum		Las Cruces	Doña Ana	Southwest	Natural history	website, teaching collection of insect specimens, open to the public by appointment
New Mexico State University Museum		Las Cruces	Doña Ana	Southwest	Anthropology	website, part of New Mexico State University, exhibits include Southwestern and Mesoamerican pottery and changing exhibits
New Mexico Veterans Memorial		Albuquerque	Bernalillo	Central New Mexico	Military	website, outdoor park with monuments and a museum
Old Coal Mine Museum		Madrid	Santa Fe	North Central	Multiple	website, exhibits include mining and railroad equipment, blacksmith shop, vintage autos and trucks, a vintage steam locomotive No. 769, firefighting equipment, medical office equipment, farm equipment, homemaking and carpentry equipment
Palace of the Governors		Santa Fe	Santa Fe	North Central	History	Important events, ideas, and themes in New Mexico's past
Pancho Villa State Park		Columbus	Luna	Southwest	Military	Site of former Camp Furlong, used by General John J. Pershing in raid against Pancho Villa, includes expedition-era examples of the vehicles and technology employed by Pershing and his men
Pecos National Historical Park		Las Vegas	San Miguel	Northeast	History	Includes ruins of the Pecos pueblo and a mission church, historic adobe ranch home and a visitor center with exhibits
Percha Bank Museum		Kingston	Sierra	Southwest	Local history	Located in a 19th-century bank building with original fixtures, local history and an art gallery
Petroglyph National Monument		Albuquerque	Bernalillo	Central New Mexico		Includes volcanos, archeological sites and an estimated 20,000 carved images
Picuris Pueblo Visitor Center and Museum		Picuris Pueblo	Taos	North Central	Native American	History, culture and art of the Picuris
Pioneer Store Museum		Winston	Sierra	Southwest	History	website, 1880s general store with intact furnishings and merchandise, mining tools and equipment
Poeh Museum		Pojoaque Pueblo	Santa Fe	North Central	Native American	Arts and culture of the Pueblo people, especially the Tewas of northern New Mexico
Ramah Museum		Ramah	McKinley	Northwest	Local history	information
Raton Museum		Raton	Union	Northeast	Local history	website, regional artifacts associated with ranching, coal mining, railroads, and pioneer life, also New Mexican art
Red Rock Museum		Church Rock	McKinley	Northwest	Native American	website, exhibits on the prehistoric Anasazi and the present-day Zuni, Hopi and Navajo, located in Red Rock Park
Rex Museum		Gallup	McKinley	Northwest	Local history	website, operated by the Gallup Historical Society
Roosevelt County Historical Museum		Portales	Roosevelt	Southeast	Local history	website, part of Eastern New Mexico University
Roswell Museum		Roswell	Chaves	Southeast	Multiple	Art and history of the American Southwest and beyond, includes fine art, decorative arts, Robert H. Goddard Collection of Liquid-Propellant Rocketry, planetarium
Route 66 Auto Museum		Santa Rosa	Guadalupe	Northeast	Automobile	Facebook site, vintage and classic automobiles, Route 66 memorabilia
Ruidoso River Museum		Ruidoso	Lincoln	Southeast	Local history	Artefacts related to notable figures of the Old West and those involved in the Lincoln County War
Runnells Gallery		Portales	Roosevelt	Southeast	Art	website, part of Eastern New Mexico University in the Golden Library
Ruth Hall Museum of Paleontology		Abiquiú	Rio Arriba	North Central	Natural history	website, part of Ghost Ranch, Triassic dinosaur fossils
Sacramento Mountains Museum & Pioneer Village		Cloudcroft	Otero	Southeast	Open air	website, operated by the Sacramento Mountains Historical Society
Salinas Pueblo Missions National Monument		Mountainair	Socorro	Southeast	Archaeology	Visitor center features exhibits about the ruins of the mission churches and pueblo of the monument
Salmon Ruins		Farmington	San Juan	Northwest	Archaeology	11th century Chacoan great house and museum
San Ildefonso Pueblo Museum		San Ildefonso Pueblo	Santa Fe	North Central	Native American	website, Pueblo history, culture and art
Santa Fe Children's Museum		Santa Fe	Santa Fe	North Central	Children's	website
Santa Fe Trail Interpretive Center		Las Vegas	San Miguel	Northeast	History	Photos and artifacts of the Santa Fe Trail
Santa Fe Trail Museum		Springer	Colfax	Northeast	Local history	Located in the former county courthouse, exhibits include Santa Fe Trail, pioneer life, art exhibits
Silver City Museum		Silver City	Grant	Southwest	Local history	website
Silver Family Geology Museum		Albuquerque	Bernalillo	Central New Mexico	Geology	website, mineral, fossil, and rock specimens; located inside Northrop Hall at University of New Mexico
Site Santa Fe		Santa Fe	Santa Fe	North Central	Art	Contemporary art exhibitions
Smokey Bear Historical Park		Capitan	Lincoln	Southeast	Natural history	website, exhibits include forest health, forest fires, wildland and urban interface issues, fire ecology, history of the Smokey Bear and the Cooperative Forest Fire Prevention Program
Space Murals Museum		Organ	Doña Ana	Southwest	Aerospace	Artifacts, art, photos and memorabilia about the space program and space
Taos Art Museum		Taos	Taos	North Central	Art	Art of early 20th century Taos, located in the studio and home of artist Nicolai Fechin
Telephone Museum of New Mexico		Albuquerque	Bernalillo	Central New Mexico	Technology	website
Tinkertown Museum		Cedar Crest	Bernalillo	Central New Mexico	Art	website, folk art creations featuring thousands of miniature, wood-carved figures including animated little people, instruments, animals and objects, miniature Western towns, carnivals, Old West memorabilia, old-fashioned arcade machines, dolls, antique tools and more
The Toy Train Depot		Alamogordo	Otero	Southeast	Railroad	Features scale model and miniature railway trains
Trinity site		Socorro	Socorro	Southwest	Historic house	Location of the assembly of the world's first nuclear weapon
Tucumcari Historical Museum		Tucumcari	Quay	Northeast	Local history	website
Turquoise Museum		Albuquerque	Bernalillo	Central New Mexico	Geology	website, turquoise mining, specimens, shaping process, uses
University of New Mexico Art Museum		Albuquerque	Bernalillo	Central New Mexico	Art	Located in Center for the Arts at University of New Mexico, includes works by modernist painter Raymond Jonson, his students and disciples
Unser Racing Museum		Albuquerque	Bernalillo	Central New Mexico	Automobile	Racing accomplishments of Al Unser family
US Southwest Soaring Museum		Moriarty	Torrance	Central New Mexico	Aviation	History of gliding in the western United States
Very Large Array		Magdalena	Socorro	Southwest	Science	Tours of the astronomical radio observatory, consisting of 27 radio antennas in a Y-shaped configuration
Vietnam Veterans Memorial State Park		Angel Fire	Colfax	Northeast	Military	Memorial and visitor center
Villa Philmonte		Cimarron	Colfax	Northeast	Historic house	1920 period ranch manor on the Philmont Scout Ranch property of the Boy Scouts of America
Walatowa Visitor Center		Jemez Pueblo	Sandoval	Northwest	Native American	website, history, art and customs of the Towa
War Eagles Air Museum		Santa Teresa	Doña Ana	Southeast	Aviation	website, historic aircraft of the World War II and the Korean War eras
Western Heritage Museum & Lea County Cowboy Hall of Fame		Hobbs	Lea	Southeast	History	Cowboy culture and heritage
Western New Mexico Aviation Heritage Museum		Grants	Cibola	Northwest	Aviation	Commemorates the Los Angeles to Amarillo segment of the Transcontinental Air Transport
Western New Mexico University Museum		Silver City	Grant	Southwest	Native American	website, part of Western New Mexico University, Mimbres pottery and culture
Wheelwright Museum of the American Indian		Santa Fe	Santa Fe	North Central	Art	Contemporary and historic Native American art
White Sands Missile Range Museum		White Sands	Otero	Southwest	Military	website, exhibits include history of America's missile and space development, Atomic Age, scientists, outdoor missile park
White Sands National Park		Alamogordo	Otero	Southeast	Natural history	Visitor center features exhibits about the natural and cultural history of the desert
Zuhl Museum		Las Cruces	Doña Ana	Southwest	Geology	website, part of New Mexico State University, showcases thousands of specimens of petrified wood, fossils and minerals

== Defunct museums ==
- Log Cabin Museum, Las Cruces, moved to Chloride, New Mexico in 2006 and now called the Grafton Cabin; currently unused.
- Million Dollar Museum, White's City, New Mexico, near Carlsbad Caverns, contents auctioned off in 2008, contained oddities and curios
- New Mexico Film Museum, Santa Fe, closed in 2010

== See also ==
- List of museums in the United States
- Nature Centers in New Mexico
