= Bertha P. Dutton =

Anthropologist, Ethnologist

Bertha Pauline Dutton
- Born: March 29, 1903; Algona, Iowa
- Died: September 11, 1994 (aged 91)
- Education: Columbia University (Ph.D.)
- Occupations: Archaeologist and ethnologist

Bertha Pauline Dutton (born in Algona, Iowa, on March 29, 1903; died September 11, 1994) was an American anthropologist and ethnologist specializing in the American Southwest and Mesoamerica. She was one of the first female archeologists to work with the National Park Service.

== Life ==
=== Early years ===
Dutton was the only child of farmers Orrin Judd Dutton and Fannie B. Stewart.

Dutton's favorite high school subjects were history, classical art and literature. She was enrolled at the Lincoln (Nebraska) School of Commerce and the University of Nebraska from 1929 to 1931. She worked as a bank clerk and had other jobs, and she initially prepared herself for a career in similar fields, but fate intervened. After she was accidentally hit by a car one evening, she had to recuperate in the hospital for several weeks. While there, one of her visiting teachers suggested that Dutton might enjoy attending the University of New Mexico to study anthropology, which seemed more in line with her interests. She took the advice and began her studies there in 1932.

She worked as secretary in the university's Anthropology Department from 1933 to 1936 and after graduation, the noted anthropologist Edgar Lee Hewett hired her at the Museum of New Mexico (MNM) in Santa Fe, New Mexico in 1936.

As Dutton was serving as Hewett's administrative assistant, she convinced him that the museum needed more than archeology exhibits. She proposed that ethnology exhibits should accompany those on archaeology and Hewett agreed, promoting her to museum curator of ethnology in 1939.

=== Museum curator ===
Hewett had hired her, along with Marjorie Ferguson (1908–2006), after he had trained both of them at the University of New Mexico. According to Fowler, "Both women spent their careers at the MNM as museum anthropologists, a specialization seen by some academic anthropologists as jobs best suited for women because, according to Yale University professor Clark Wissler, of their "natural housekeeping skills." But both made significant contributions to Southwest research in archaeology, ethnology, and history, while also educating the public." Dutton was curator of ethnology from 1939 to 1959, curator of interpretive exhibits until 1962 and head of the Division of Research until her retirement in 1965. In addition, Dutton taught the museum's television and adult education classes from 1947 to 1957 while remaining a research associate with the Museum of New Mexico until the end of her life. Meanwhile, in 1952, Dutton earned her PhD at Columbia University.

Her excavation projects included Chaco Canyon (Leyit Kin), in the Galisteo Basin (Pueblo Largo, Las Madres), and in the Salinas area (Abó). She also excavated in Mexico and Guatemala using her joint appointment as a research associate of the School of American Research (now School for Advanced Research).

=== Outreach efforts ===
As part of her efforts to spread interest about anthropology and ethnology to the public, "she led 27 archaeological mobile and excavation camps for Senior Girl Scouts (aged fifteen to eighteen) between 1947 and 1957, introducing nearly 300 girls from throughout the nation to the anthropology of the Southwest". This program resulted in several of these young women pursuing advanced degrees in anthropology and related fields.

After retiring in 1965 from the MNM, Dutton was named director of the Museum of Navajo Ceremonial Art (now Wheelwright Museum of the American Indian), where she worked for ten years.

She died in 1994.

== Selected publications ==
- Łeyit Kin, a small house ruin, Chaco Canyon, New Mexico; excavation report, 1938
- The Jemez Mountain region, 1938
- A history of plumbate ware, 1942
- Excavations at Tajumulco, Guatemala, 1943
- The Pueblo Indian world: studies on the natural history of the Río Grande Valley in relation to Pueblo Indian culture, 1945
- Indian arts and crafts of the Southwest in the Santa Fe Indian Village, Chicago Railroad Fair, 1948
- The Toltecs and their influence on the culture of Chichen Itza, 1951
- Highlights of the Jémez region, 1952
- Pocket handbook, New Mexico Indians, 1953
- New Mexico Indians and their Arizona neighbors, 1955
- Tula of the Toltecs, 1955
- Indian artistry in wood and other media: an exhibition in the Hall of ethnology, Museum of New Mexico, 1957
- Navaho ceremonies, 1958?
- An archaeological survey of the proposed Galisteo Dam and Reservoir, 196?
- Indians of the Southwest, 1961
- Santa Fe area, 1962
- Indian villages, past & present, 1962
- Happy people: the Huichol Indians, 1962
- Sun Father's way; the Kiva murals of Kuaua; a Pueblo ruin, Coronado State Monument, New Mexico, 1963
- Friendly people: the Zuñi Indians, 1963
- New Mexico Indian reservations and pueblos., 1964
- New Mexico's Indians of today, 1964
- Let's explore Indian villages, past & present. Tour guide for Santa Fe area, 1970
- Navajo weaving today,, 1975
- Indians of the American Southwest, 1976
- The Pueblos, 1977
- The Ranchería, Ute, and Southern Paiute peoples, 1977
- The Laguna calendar, 1977
- Navahos and Apaches: the Athabascan peoples, 1977
- Navajo, Pima, Apache, 1978
- Hopi, Acoma, Tewa, Zuni, 1986
- Navajo, Pima, Apache, 1986
- Myths et legends of the Indians of the SouthwestnBook I, Hopi, Acoma, Tewa, Zuni, 1987
- Myths et legends of the Indians of the SouthwestnBook II, Navajo, Pima, Apache, 1987
