= Martha White (disambiguation) =

Martha White is an American flour and cornmeal brand. The name may also refer to:

- Linda Taylor (born Martha Louise White, 1926–2002), American fraudster
- Martha Tabram (née White, 1849–1888), English murder victim
- Martha White (computer scientist), Canadian computer scientist
- Martha Root White (died 1937), American philanthropist and socialite
