= Chapin Mesa Archeological Museum =

Archaeological museum in Colorado, U.S.

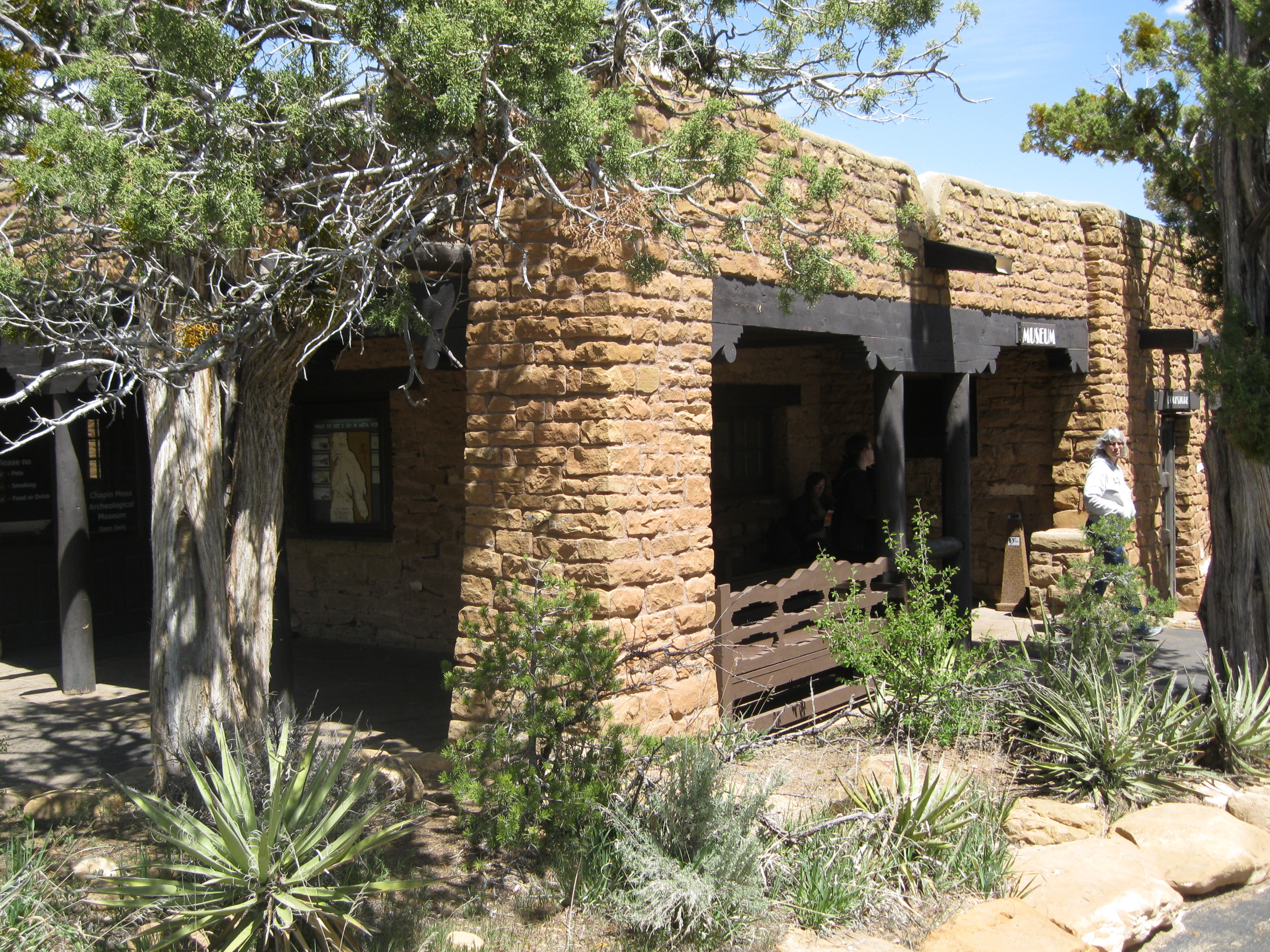
- Entrance of the Chapin Mesa Archeological Museum
- Location: Mesa Verde National Park
- Coordinates: 37.1845°N 108.4883°W
- Type: Archaeological museum
- Website: nps.gov/meve/planyourvisit/museum.htm

The Chapin Mesa Archeological Museum is an archaeological museum in Montezuma County, Colorado, United States. Situated within Mesa Verde National Park, it is one of the main features of the Mesa Verde Administrative District, a National Historic Landmark since 1987.

== Museum Building and History ==
Dating to 1922–1925, the Pueblo Revival museum building, designed and constructed during the tenure of archeologist and park superintendent Jesse L. Nusbaum, is an early example of "parkitecture" an informal name for park buildings intentionally designed to be aesthetically appropriate to and reflective of the natural environment and strong cultural traditions of the various natural parks. It is one of six park buildings created from local buff sandstone with projecting wood beams ("vigas"). The museum's construction was funded by donations from John D. Rockefeller Jr.

The museum is situated on Chapin Mesa on the Spruce Tree Loop, near Spruce Tree Canyon. The canyon rim behind the building offers a view of Spruce Tree House, one of the largest and best preserved cliff dwellings in the park.

== Museum collections ==
The museum offers a short film providing an overview of Mesa Verde National Park and the history of archeological work there as well as displays of artifacts including pottery, baskets, weavings, tools, household implements, and other archeological finds from the Mesa Verde region. It also features five dioramas that offer interpretations of prehistoric Mesa Verde and of the Ancestral Puebloans in their daily lives spanning a period from 13,000 BCE to 1200 CE. The dioramas were created by members of the Civilian Conservation Corps in the 1930s and are now themselves an important aspect of the park's history. In 2019, an initial thirty thousand dollar federal grant was awarded to the University of Colorado as part of the project for conserving the dioramas, upgrading the museum's display cases, and adding interactivity to exhibits. As part of the project to improve the exhibits, the IDIA Lab at Ball State University is developing an augmented reality mobile app. When downloaded to a visitor's mobile device, the app will be capable of superimposing digital figures over the existing dioramas to bring the exhibitions to life and to offer a fuller and more accurate depiction of the Ancestral Pueblo people.

== Renovations ==
As part of a multi-year renovation and redesign project the structure and the exhibit areas have been upgraded and modernized to improve the visitor experience while respecting its historic architecture. The US Park Service and CU Boulder, in consultation and collaboration with the Native Interpretation Working Group formed of representatives of twenty-seven Pueblos and Tribes, have developed culturally appropriate exhibits. The museum is operating on its normal seasonal schedule as the project moves into its final stages. The exhibits are expected to be installed by fall 2027.

== See also ==
- Frederick H. Chapin
- National Park Service rustic "parkitecture"
