= Mesa Verde Administrative District =

Historic district in Colorado, United States

- U.S. National Register of Historic Places
- U.S. National Historic Landmark District
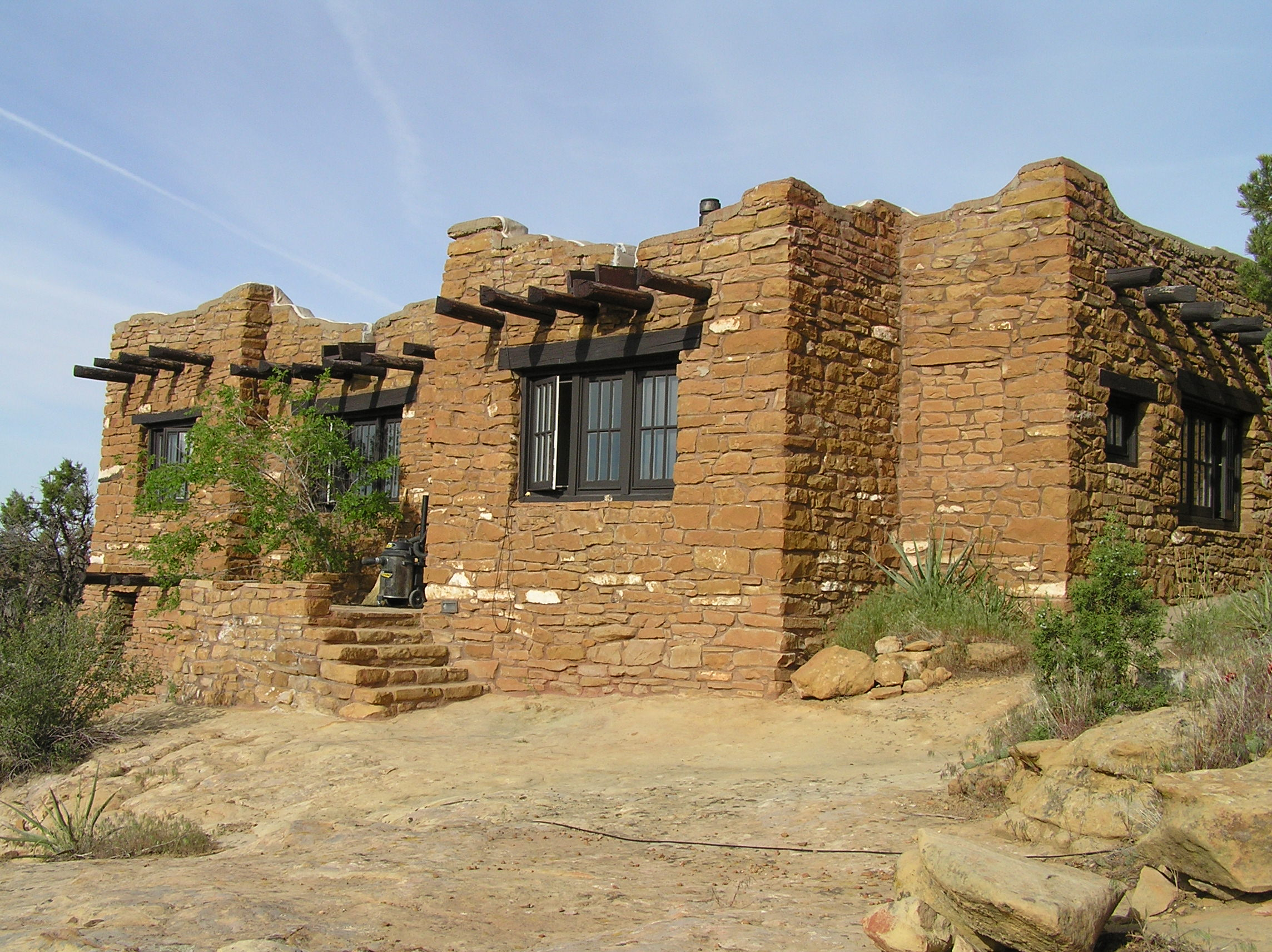
- Superintendent's Residence

- Location within Colorado Location within the United States
- Location: Mesa Verde National Park, Colorado
- Coordinates: 37°11′03″N 108°29′18″W
- Area: 3.17 acres (1.28 ha)
- Built: 1921
- Architect: NPS Branch of Plans & Design; Jesse Nusbaum
- Architectural style: Pueblo Revival Style
- NRHP reference No.: 87001410

Significant dates
- Added to NRHP: May 28, 1987
- Designated NHLD: May 29, 1987

Mesa Verde Administrative District is a set of six National Park Service buildings within Mesa Verde National Park, constructed between 1921 and 1927 in the Pueblo Revival style. Located on Chapin Mesa, these were the structures built by the Park Service to use culturally relevant architectural traditions in park architecture. The buildings were declared a National Historic Landmark District in 1987.

== History ==
Mesa Verde National Park was founded in 1906 to preserve a series of spectacular Ancestral Puebloan ruins and archaeological sites in southwestern Colorado. The National Park Service was founded in 1916 to manage the nation's growing inventory of national parks. It did not begin significant oversight of Mesa Verde until 1921, when archaeologist Jesse Nussbaum took over its administration. During his tenure (which lasted until 1931), the buildings described below were built on Chapin Mesa to support the administration of the park.

The buildings share a common architectural vocabulary, which includes the use of sandstone, some of which was taken from some of the park's prehistoric structures. The walls typically have a battered exterior, and are covered by a roof supported by vigas. Woodwork in the buildings is worked to appear as if it had been fashioned using pioneer tools, and the interior walls are plastered.

The landmark buildings include:

- National Park Headquarters, 1923
- Chapin Mesa Museum, 1923–24
- Post Office, 1923
- Ranger Dormitory, 1925
- Superintendents Residence, 1921
- Community Building, 1927

Most of these buildings have undergone subsequent alteration and expansion, as the needs of the park administration have grown and changed. The buildings are clustered in a roughly 3-acre (1.2 ha) area on Chapin Mesa.
