= Jesse L. Nusbaum =

American archaeologist

Jesse Logan Nusbaum
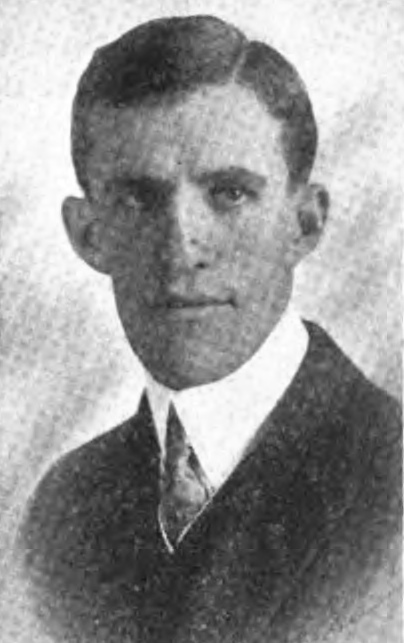
- Born: September 3, 1887; Greeley, Colorado
- Died: December 21, 1975 (aged 88); Santa Fe, New Mexico
- Employer: Mesa Verde National Park
- Organization: National Park Service

Jesse Logan Nusbaum (1887–1975), was an American archaeologist, anthropologist, photographer and National Park Service Superintendent who lived in the American Southwest, where he made significant achievements in the identification, documentation, restoration and preservation of the region's Native American and Spanish Colonial architectural and cultural heritage.

== Personal life ==
Jesse L. Nusbaum was born in Greeley, Colorado, on September 3, 1887, to Edward Moore and Agnes Strickland (Moodie) Nusbaum. His parents and maternal grandparents were members of the original Greeley colony organized by Horace Greeley.

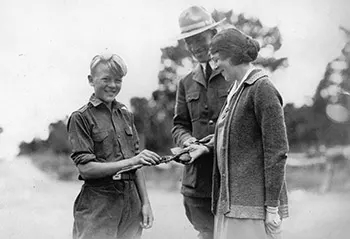
Nusbaum with Aileen and Deric at Mesa Verde

Nusbaum married Aileen Baehrens O'Bryan, who had one son, Deric, from a previous marriage, on September 21, 1920. Jesse and Aileen divorced in 1939. Nusbaum subsequently married Rosemary Lewis Rife, a nurse, on December 11, 1947.

He died in Santa Fe, New Mexico, on December 21, 1975, at the age of 88. A few years later, his wife, Rosemary, published two books on parts of Jesse's work (see Bibliography); she died on January 17, 1990 (aged 82). Both are buried at the Santa Fe National Cemetery.

Nusbaum was educated at local public schools in Greeley, then went on to receive his Bachelor's degree in Pedagogy from the Colorado Teachers College in 1907. Nusbaum's father, Edward, who was a brick mason, taught him skills that Jesse drew on during later on, working at Mesa Verde National Park.

Jesse Nusbaum was an early reader and photographer and developed a keen interest in cliff dwellings and other artifacts of ancient Southwestern Native American cultures. He quickly gained a reputation as a photographer while a student at the Colorado State Normal School (later the University of Northern Colorado) in Greeley, Colorado. In 1907, he graduated with a major in manual arts and began teaching at the New Mexico Normal School at Las Vegas, New Mexico.

== Professional career ==
In the summer of 1907, Jesse L. Nusbaum entered his first involvement with Mesa Verde National Park when he was nominated at the request of anthropologist Dr. Edgar Lee Hewett as a photographer and archeological assistant to Alfred V. Kidder, to participate in the survey of the archaeological sites of the newly designated National Park. He spent the following summer in a similar fashion. Together with fellow young archeologists Alfred V. Kidder and Sylvanus Morley, with whom he became lifelong friend (some called them the “Three Musketeers of southwestern archaeology”) they recorded, documented and photographed locations of cliff dwellings and other archaeological sites throughout the National Park and on the ‘Ute Mountain Ute Indian Reservation’, providing important data for future archaeological research.

Nusbaum returned the following summer to complete the survey, on the West side of the Park. Then, after the completion of the Mesa Verde survey in 1908, Nusbaum went on photographing and surveying Ancestral Puebloan sites in nearby McElmo Canyon and at Hovenweep National Monument in Eastern Utah, and, farther west, to Alkali Ridge in Utah. During these summers, after he had finished the survey work, Nusbaum joined the staff of the Dr. Edgar Lee Hewett led School of American Research at Rito de los Frijoles in the future Bandelier National Monument, West of Santa Fe, New Mexico.

In 1909 anthropologist Dr. Edgar Lee Hewett then invited Jesse L. Nusbaum to Santa Fe, New Mexico to oversee the restoration of the Palace of the Governors that had fallen into disrepair. For this assignment, which was completed in the Fall of 1913, Jesse L. Nusbaum was hired as the first employee of the Dr. Edgar Lee Hewett led School of American Archaeology, later the School of American Research, and Museum of New Mexico in Santa Fe, New Mexico. In his journal, Nusbaum stressed the importance of melding the Palace architecture with the environment, noting that “the Palace was begun with an adaptation to climate and atmosphere and had been fitted into the color of earth and sky”, a view he later applied again as Superintendent of Mesa Verde National Park.

In this new assignment, Jesse L. Nusbaum also conducted periodic archeological surveys, investigations, excavations, and ruins stabilization in other States, together with other archeologists or persons interested with Native American cultures, such as Charles Fletcher Lummis. In so doing, he went to Guatemala, Honduras, Mexico, Colorado, as well as in New Mexico including the Pajarito Plateau. Nusbaum also came back to Mesa Verde for the excavation, repair, and stabilization of Balcony House, an important and difficult project that extended in October and November 1910, and was completed after a satisfactory inspection by Edgar Lee Hewett

In 1911 and 1912, Nusbaum spent nine months in Washington, D. C., to work on the Southwestern 'Painted Desert' exhibits sponsored by the Atchison, Topeka and Santa Fe Railway for the Panama–California Exposition to be held in San Diego, California, in 1915 and 1916. The Atchison, Topeka and Santa Fe Railway used some of Nusbaum's photographs of Native Americans to advertise their exhibit, with eleven of his pictures appearing in the official "Painted Desert" brochure. Some of these images were made into post cards and sold by the Railway through the Fred Harvey (entrepreneur) concessions.

While in Washington, Nusbaum also took advanced courses at night and continued his advanced studies in Colorado during the summer of 1913.

In 1913, Nusbaum also worked three months in the Maya ruins of Yucatan with Dr. Sylvanus Morley.

In 1915, working under archeologist Alfred V. Kidder, Nusbaum began the stabilization and repair of the mission ruins at Pecos Pueblo, just east of Santa Fe. Together they worked on expanding the scientific knowledge of the site. Nusbaum also helped restore the mission church at Pecos.

In 1916 Nusbaum assisted archeologist Frederick Webb Hodge with the beginning of his expedition at Hawikuh, near Zuni Pueblo, New Mexico.

In 1918 and 1919, as the United States joined World War I, Jesse L. Nusbaum attempted to serve as an aviator, but was assigned as an engineer and served in France. He enlisted in May 1918 and was discharged April 1919.

From May 1919 to June 1921, he was employed at the Museum of the American Indian, George Gustav Heye Center Foundation in New York City. While Nusbaum was working in New York he took part in several southwest expeditions, especially one in southwestern Utah, at Hawikuh Pueblo and at a Basketmaker culture cave named ‘Du Pont’ from its financial backer. On this expedition, Nusbaum found himself at the core of Southwest archaeology, as questions of Basketmaker culture were then under intense research.

In 1921, while still in New York, he was selected by Stephen Mather, Director of the National Park Service and Arno B. Cammerer, his deputy, to become Superintendent at Mesa Verde National Park, with a goal to significantly improve the ways the National Park was organized and managed. Nusbaum proved to be a very effective Superintendent, advancing the development of the Park and preserving its archeological resources. He discontinued grazing, built a museum and developed interpretive programs, especially ones designed to explain the Antiquities Act of 1906.

In 1924, as Park Superintendent, he guided the visit of John D. Rockefeller Jr. to Mesa Verde National Park, a visit which was followed by several donations to the Park by John D. Rockefeller Jr. and his family.

His involvement with the Antiquities Act of 1906 led to his designation in 1927 as the lead archeologist and prime enforcer of the Act for the Southwest, while remaining Mesa Verde superintendent. It was in this capacity that Jesse L. Nusbaum issued in November 1929 a report to the Department of the Interior raising concerns about the damages caused by an increasing number of visitors on Pueblo ruins, including theft and vandalism. He recommended measures towards a better education of the public and a better organization of visits.

Nusbaum continued this dual capacity of National Park Service Superintendent and archeologist until January 1930, when he took a leave of absence subsequent to the Secretary of the Interior Ray Lyman Wilbur approving his appointment as acting director of the new Laboratory of Anthropology at Santa Fe, New Mexico. This new laboratory was created to focus on ancient Southwestern Native American cultures, and was initially funded with several hundred thousand Dollars by several prominent personalities, including and mostly John D. Rockefeller Jr. In 1947, the Laboratory of Anthropology and the Museum of New Mexico were merged into the Museum of Indian Arts and Culture, Santa Fe, New Mexico. Nusbaum continued as director of the Laboratory of Anthropology until 1935, having earlier returned to the National Park Service and resumed his dual duties as Mesa Verde National Park Superintendent and Department of the Interior archeologist enforcing the Antiquities Act.

Nusbaum continued this dual position for many years, serving a combined total of seventeen years as Mesa Verde National Park Superintendent, from June 3, 1921, to January 1946, with interruptions for additional temporary assignments.

In 1946 he left Mesa Verde National Park and his dual role for Santa Fe, New Mexico. At the National Park Service regional office there, he took up increased duties as the senior archeologist of the NPS. In this capacity, Nusbaum began one of the first salvage archeology projects when he persuaded El Paso Natural Gas Company to allow archeological excavation along their pipelines.

For his many other accomplishments, Jesse L. Nusbaum received the Distinguished Service Award from the Department of the Interior in 1954, with Horace M. Albright, a former director of the National Park Service, stating that Jesse L. Nusbaum was “one of the best Superintendents we ever had.”

After a year's extension Nusbaum was forced to retire from the National Park Service at the age of 71 in 1957.

Residing on Santa Fe, New Mexico, he remained involved in archeology and with Mesa Verde, providing advice and contributing to various books and publications.

He died in Santa Fe, New Mexico in December 1975, at the age of 88.

In January 1981, the National Park Service inhouse magazine, 'The Courier', published a 'Person of the Month' article dedicated to Jesse L. Nusbaum, titled "Jesse L. Nusbaum: Defender of American antiquities". The article is illustrated by several photographs of Jesse L. Nusbaum at work at Mesa Verde National Park.

The National Park Service (NPS) History Collection, Harpers Ferry Center, Harpers Ferry, West Virginia holds some of Nusbaum's correspondence and papers. These papers were given by his wife, Rosemary L. Nusbaum. They were generated and collected by her husband during his service as NPS archeologist. The Santa Fe, NM, Museum of Indian Arts and Culture holds part of Jesse L. Nusbaum correspondence as Director of the Laboratory of Anthropology (Museum of New Mexico), Santa Fe, New Mexico.

The Smithsonian Institution 'Archives of American Art' stores a 1963 oral interview with Jesse L. Nusbaum which can be reached online.

During his younger days, and throughout his career, Jesse L. Nusbaum took many photographs of southwestern Native American people, mostly Navajo and Pueblo, and of sites, buildings and villages, as well as of other archeologists and their colleagues and friends. Many of these historical photos are archived and retrievable at a few institutions, i.e. mostly the Smithsonian, the University of New Mexico and the Santa Fe Palace of the Governors archives.

== Bibliography and correspondence ==
- Heriot, Ruthanne (1987), Nathanson, David (2004 update): “Finding Aide to the Jesse L. Nusbaum Papers, 1921–1958”, National Park Service
- Jesse L. Nusbaum papers, Talley collection, 1906–1978. Correspondence relating to Laboratory of Anthropology work, including letters from E.L. Hewett concerning the Panama–California Exposition in San Diego (1915–1916), the reconstruction of the Palace of the Governors, and the construction of the Museum of Fine Arts
- Smith, Duane A.: "A love affair that almost wasn't: The Nusbaum years" – Mesa Verde Museum Association, 1981, ASIN B0006YIG4C
- Nusbaum, Rosemary: ”Tierra Dulce: Reminiscences from the Jesse Nusbaum Papers”. The Sunstone Press, Santa Fe, New Mexico, 1980, ISBN 0913270830
- Nusbaum, Rosemary: ”The City Different and the Palace: The Palace of the Governors and its Role in Santa Fe History, including Jesse Nusbaum’s Restoration Journals”. The Sunstone Press, Santa Fe, 1978, ISBN 0913270792
- Hegemann, Elizabeth Compton, with introduction by Jesse L. Nusbaum: "Navaho Trading Days – with 318 rare photographs" – University of New Mexico Press, Albuquerque, NM, 1963, 1987, 2004 ISBN 0826309402
- Fred Nancy Fox, Orian Lewis & Jesse Nusbaum: "Pipeline Archeology: Reports of Salvage Operations in the Southwest on El Paso Natural Gas Company Projects.1950–1953" – Laboratory of Anthropology and Museum of Northern Arizona, 1956, ASIN B00BK6WIX0 ASIN B000K2MRSG
- V.Drayton, E. Croft; Rudellat, J.; Clark, Valma; Diaz, J. Sanz; Battersby, J.; Espinos, J. M.; Sinclair, J. L.; Anderson, A. J. O.; Wilson, Bates; Nusbaum, Jesse L.; Towsend, Rea; Salas :"Spanish Culture in the United States" – Revista Geográfica Española, 1940, ASIN B00LDSWYNE
- Nusbaum, Jesse L.: "The new Laboratory of Anthropology at Santa Fe" – 1931, ASIN B00087UFPU
- Nusbaum, Jesse L.; Kidder, Alfred Vincent; Guernsey, Samuel James (1922). "A basket-maker cave in Kane County, Utah". library.si.edu. Heye Foundation.

== Other sources ==
- "Jesse L. Nusbaum negatives and photographs - Collections Search Center, Smithsonian Institution". collections.si.edu.
- "Palace of the Governors - Photo Archives". www.palaceofthegovernors.org.
- "Jesse L. Nusbaum Collection, 1906 - 1939 - Celebrating New Mexico Statehood". nmstatehood.unm.edu.
