= Marjorie F. Lambert =

American anthropologist and archaeologist

- circa 1960
- Born: Marjorie Elizabeth Ferguson; June 13, 1908; Colorado Springs, Colorado
- Died: December 16, 2006 (aged 98); Santa Fe, New Mexico
- Other names: Marjorie F. Tichy, Marjorie Tichy-Lambert
- Occupations: anthropologist, archaeologist
- Years active: 1932-1970s
- Known for: research in the American southwest
- Spouses: George Tichy (m. 1932, div. 1950); Everett Vey "Jack" Lambert (m. 1950)

Marjorie Ferguson Lambert (1908–2006) was an American anthropologist and archaeologist, who primarily studied Native American and Hispanic cultures in the American Southwest. Her most known archeological excavation was the dig at Paa-ko located on the Galisteo Basin. She was a curator of the Museum of New Mexico from 1937 to 1969 and published numerous papers regarding the cultures of the Puebloan peoples. Her work was acknowledged for its technical detail and cultural sensitivity by the Society for American Archaeology and the New Mexico Office of Cultural Affairs.

== Early life ==
Marjorie Elizabeth Ferguson was born on June 13, 1908, in Colorado Springs, Colorado. Interested in archaeology since high school, she did not think of it as a profession until she attended lectures by Edgar Lee Hewett and Sylvanus Morley, who convinced her that to understand humanity one had to understand the past. She attended Colorado College between 1926 and 1930 earning a BA in sociology. She was then offered a researching and teaching fellowship at the University of New Mexico, which she began in the summer of 1930. Women were not taught excavation techniques, as a means of dissuading them from pursuing a career in archeology and Ferguson, who had received the only fellowship in the anthropology department faced the discrimination and tension her gender caused in the male-dominated field. She completed her master's degree with a thesis entitled The Acculturation of Sandia Pueblo in 1931.

== Career ==
In 1932, Ferguson married George Tichy and though they lived together for less than a year, she would remain married to him for eighteen years. That same year, she began teaching at the University of New Mexico and served on the staff of the Maxwell Museum. She taught anthropology and served as field supervisor of the archeological field studies for the university. Between 1931 and 1936, she supervised digs at the Puaray, Kuaua, Giusewa sites. Ferguson became known for her systematic and meticulous excavations and began working at the Paa-ko site, the one most associated with her work, in 1935. She took over the site from two male colleagues in 1936 and successfully completed the project. Suspicion that the laborers would refuse to work for a woman were unfounded.

In 1937, when Hewett retired from the University of New Mexico, he hired Ferguson as the Curator of Archeology at the Museum of New Mexico of the School of American Archaeology in Santa Fe. The appointment was one of the first curatorial positions for a woman in the United States and was followed with Hewett's hiring of Bertha P. Dutton as ethnology curator of the museum.

During this period Ferguson excavated Paa-ko, Puaray, and Kuaua between 1937 and 1939. She wrote four reports on the research of Paa-ko but was unable, due to her museum work, to complete the final site report until 1954. Interesting in developing the cultural history of the various Puebloan peoples, Ferguson was at the forefront of moving ethnoarchaeology toward cultural sensitivity. She often consulted with elders before creating museum displays. She became an authority on dating, using cross-dating techniques analyzing various dates inferred from examination of pottery, tree rings, and rocks and tribe members were known to bring objects to her for identification.

Beginning in 1938, she served as a judge of Pueblo pottery at the Santa Fe Indian Market. Ferguson arranged lectures and activities for the Archaeological Society of New Mexico and though she was unpaid for her service to them, she served as de facto secretary of the organization from 1943 to 1956. In 1944, she began preparatory work on Juan de Oñate's capital at the Mission San Gabriel combining archaeological and historical methods. Then in 1946 and 1947, she excavated sites in Mexico, but her fieldwork was limited by the demands of the museum. In 1950, Ferguson married Everett Vey "Jack" Lambert. One of her last excavations was at a cave site in Hidalgo County, New Mexico, in 1960.

After the Hidalgo County excavation, Marjorie Lambert began to focus more on education and cultural preservation. She published nearly 200 papers during her career, before retiring in 1969. That same year, she began working on the Board of Managers at the School of American Research and then in the 1970s worked on the development and planning of a museum at Picuris Pueblo. The museum marked the first time that archeological remains found a permanent home within their community. She was recognized during her lifetime for her extensive knowledge and technical skill. Lambert received the award for Outstanding Contributions to American Archeology for the 50th Anniversary of the Society for American Archaeology in 1985. In 1988, she was honored with the New Mexico Heritage Preservation Award from the Santa Fe Office of Cultural Affairs and she and her husband shared the recognition as Santa Fe Living Treasures awarded that same year.

Lambert was an acquaintance of Georgia O'Keeffe through the artist's interest in rocks and Indian artifacts, through their mutual associates Maria Chabot and Mary Cabot Wheelright.

Marjorie Lambert died on 16 December 2006 in Santa Fe, New Mexico.
