= Cedar Crest, New Mexico =

- Census-designated place
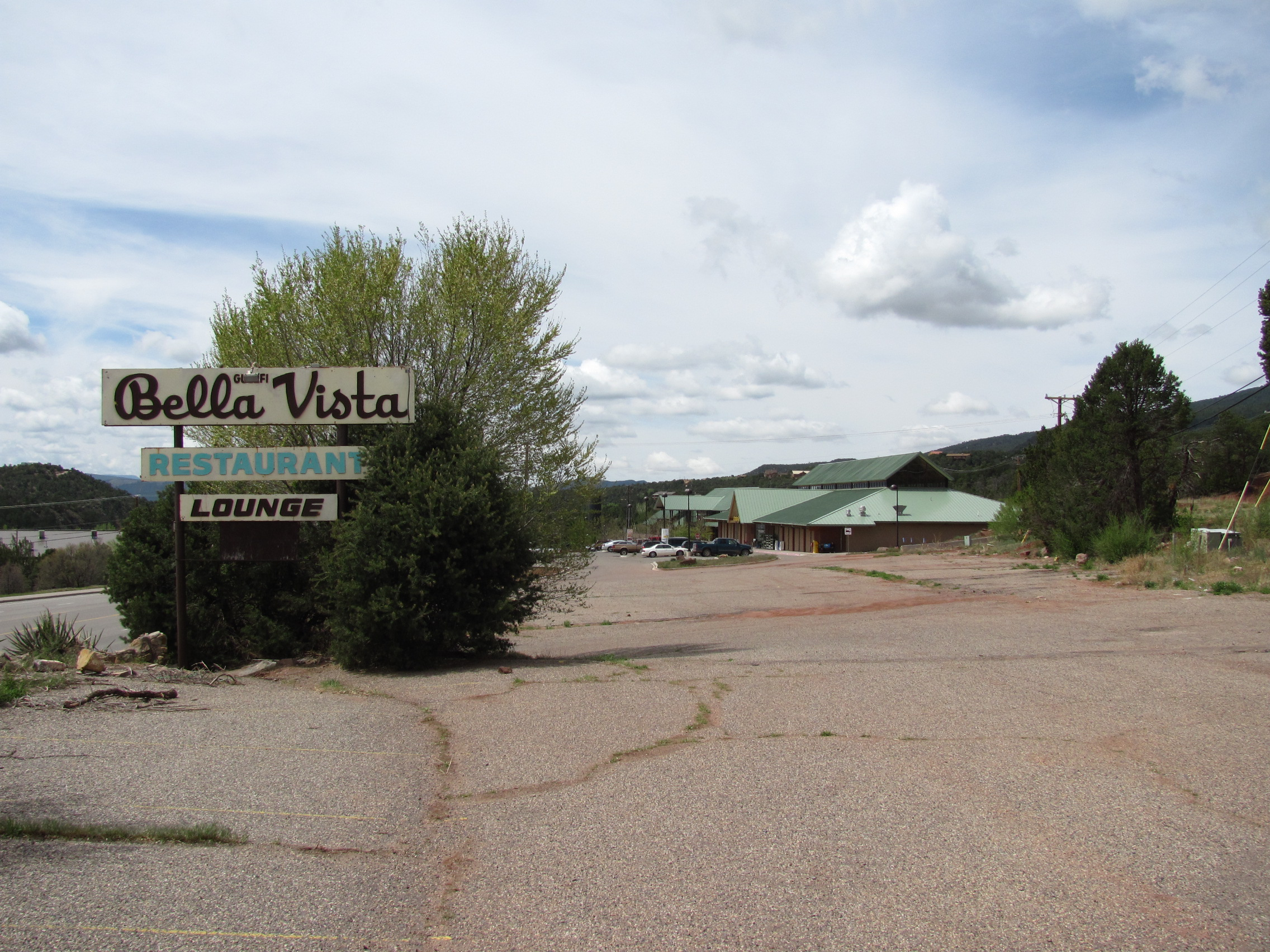
- Triangle Grocery and Old Bella Vista sign

- Location of Cedar Crest, New Mexico

- Location in the United States
- Coordinates: 35°06′50″N 106°22′30″W
- Country: United States
- State: New Mexico
- County: Bernalillo

Area
  - Total: 3.13 sq mi (8.10 km^{2})
  - Land: 3.12 sq mi (8.09 km^{2})
  - Water: 0 sq mi (0.00 km^{2})
- Elevation: 6,779 ft (2,066 m)

Population (2020)
  - Total: 933
  - Density: 298.5/sq mi (115.27/km^{2})
- Time zone: UTC-7 (Mountain (MST))
  - Summer (DST): UTC-6 (MDT)
- ZIP code: 87008
- Area code: 505
- FIPS code: 35-13200
- GNIS feature ID: 2407997

Cedar Crest is a census-designated place (CDP) in Bernalillo County, New Mexico, United States. As of the 2020 census, Cedar Crest had a population of 933. It is part of the Albuquerque Metropolitan Statistical Area.

== Geography ==
Cedar Crest is located in eastern Bernalillo County along the eastern base of the Sandia Mountains. It is bordered by the village of Tijeras to the south.

According to the United States Census Bureau, the CDP has a total area of 3.1 square miles (8.1 km^{2}), all land.

== Demographics ==
Historical population
Census	Pop.	Note	%±
2020	933		—
U.S. Decennial Census

At the 2000 census, there were 1,060 people, 470 households, and 322 families in the CDP. The population density was 323.9 inhabitants per square mile (125.1/km^{2}). There were 501 housing units at an average density of 153.1 per square mile (59.1/km^{2}). The racial makeup of the CDP was 86.89% White, 1.23% African American, 1.42% Native American, 1.13% Asian, 0.09% Pacific Islander, 6.89% from other races, and 2.36% from two or more races. Hispanic or Latino of any race were 19.81%.

Of the 470 households 23.8% had children under the age of 18 living with them, 57.7% were married couples living together, 8.1% had a female householder with no husband present, and 31.3% were non-families. 26.0% of households were one person and 5.1% were one person aged 65 or older. The average household size was 2.22 and the average family size was 2.64.

The age distribution was 19.2% under the age of 18, 4.6% from 18 to 24, 27.1% from 25 to 44, 36.0% from 45 to 64, and 13.0% 65 or older. The median age was 45 years. For every 100 females, there were 103.1 males. For every 100 females age 18 and over, there were 96.3 males.

The median household income was $50,865 and the median family income was $62,054. Males had a median income of $42,400 versus $28,500 for females. The per capita income for the CDP was $27,263. About 5.1% of families and 7.6% of the population were below the poverty line, including 2.1% of those under age 18 and 10.3% of those age 65 or over.

== Education ==
It is zoned to Albuquerque Public Schools.

== Culture ==
The Tinkertown Museum is located in Cedar Crest.

== See also ==
- List of census-designated places in New Mexico
