= Vera von Blumenthal =

Educator

Madame Vera (or Verra) von Blumenthal together with Rose Dugan (or Dougan) contributed to the development of the Pueblo Indian pottery industry by teaching the potters of the local pueblos techniques which made the pottery more attractive to collectors. They lived at Duchess Castle, north of Santa Fe, New Mexico around 1918 during the summer and in Pasadena, California during the winter. The archeologist Edgar Lee Hewett may have contributed to this effort.

== See also ==
- Santa Fe and the United States
