= Douglas W. Schwartz =

American archaeologist (1929–2016)

- Born: July 29, 1929; Erie, Pennsylvania, U.S.
- Died: June 29, 2016 (aged 86)
- Occupation: Archaeologist

Douglas W. Schwartz (July 29, 1929 – June 29, 2016) was an American archaeologist best known for his work on the anthropology and archaeology of the American Southwest. He was described by the School for Advanced Research (SAR) where he had been President and CEO as "a towering figure in the history of SAR and American archaeology".

== Early life and education ==
Schwartz was the son of Harry and Vernon Schwartz. He was born in Erie, Pennsylvania and brought up there and in Lexington, Kentucky. He developed an interest in archaeology as a teenager, hitch-hiking across the continent when he was 16 to take part in an archaeological dig in California. He did his undergraduate work at the University of Kentucky graduating in 1950 and went on to study at Yale University where he received his PhD in 1955, returning to the University of Kentucky to teach. He taught archaeology at the University from 1955 to 1967, becoming a tenured professor and director of the University's Museum of Archaeology.

== School of American Research ==
In 1967 he became the new director of the School of American Research. Schwartz broadened the School's focus to embrace advanced scholarship in anthropology and the humanities worldwide; and to promote the study, preservation, and creation of Southwest Indian art. Schwartz also continued the School's archaeological research with field excavations in the Grand Canyon in the late 1960s and, in the 1970s, the excavations of Arroyo Hondo Pueblo.
