= New Mexico History Museum =

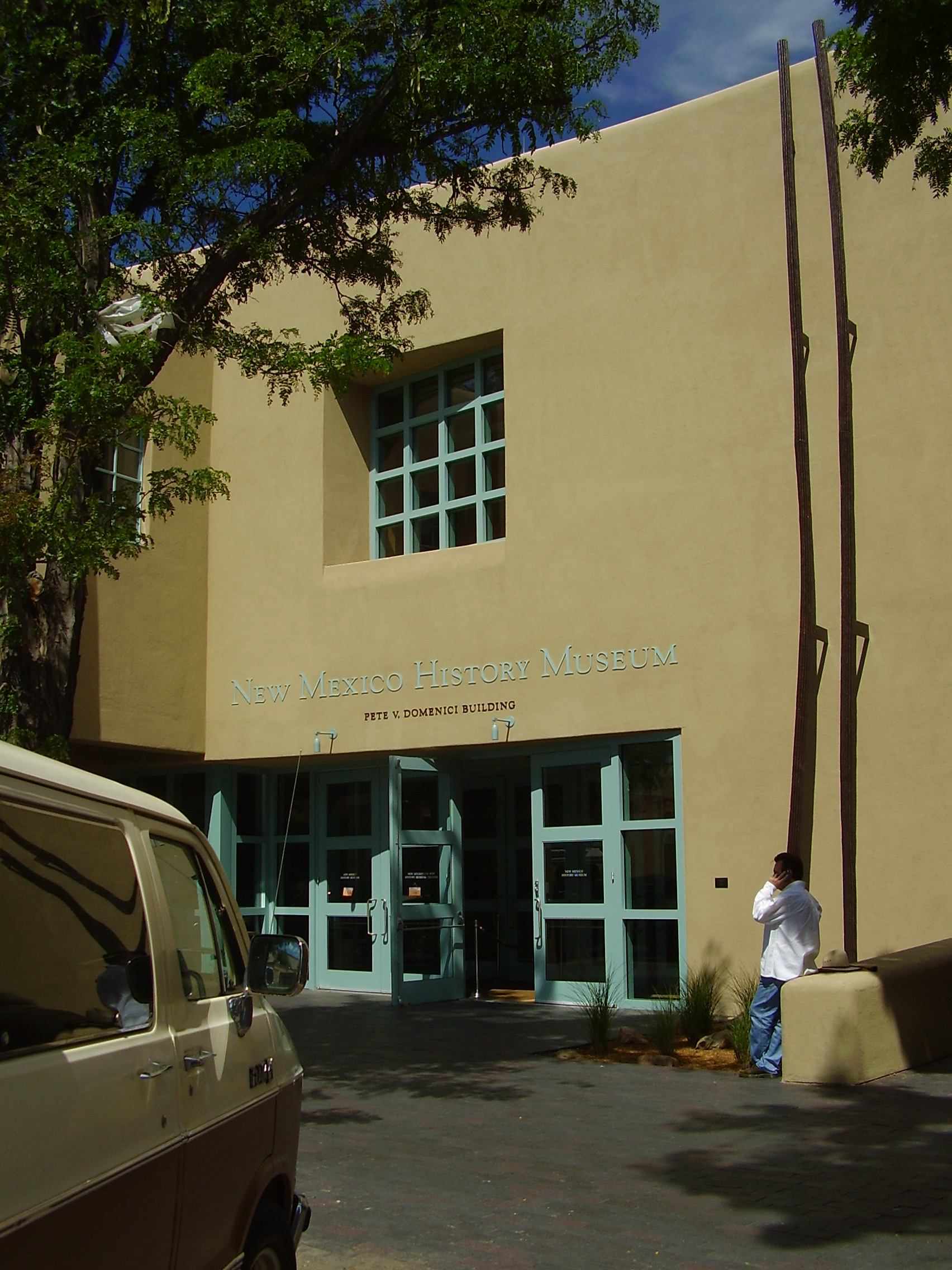
- Museum entrance
- Established: 2009
- Location: 113 Lincoln Ave. Santa Fe, New Mexico
- Coordinates: 35°41′18″N 105°56′17″W
- Type: History museum
- Website: www.nmhistorymuseum.org

The New Mexico History Museum is a history museum in Santa Fe, New Mexico, US. It is part of the state-run Museum of New Mexico system operated by the New Mexico Department of Cultural Affairs. Opened in 2009, the museum houses 96,000 square feet (8,900 m^{2}) of permanent and rotating exhibits covering the history of New Mexico from ancient Native American cultures to the present.

The museum was built after the Museum of New Mexico's collection of historic artifacts had outgrown its previous home at the 400-year-old Palace of the Governors. The new US$44 million museum opened to the public on May 24, 2009, holdings around 20,000 artifacts, and receiving more than 10,000 visitors on its first day.

The New Mexico History Museum. has 3½ floors of exhibitions telling the stories that made the American West, from the early lives of Native people to Spanish colonists. The museum has a section for the Fray Angélico Chávez History Library and Photo Archives. It also has the Palace Print Shop & Bindery, and the Native American Artisans Program. 501 New Mexicans were killed in the First World War. On 11 November 2018, the 100th anniversary of the Armistice, New Mexico History Museum opened "The First World War" exhibit. “The New Mexico Showcase” was opened in July 2024, and features “Curious Contraptions and Collectible Curiosities” designed by local New Mexico companies, Ideum and Chiodo Design.

== Facilities ==
In addition to the main building, the museum campus includes the following facilities:

- Palace of the Governors
- Fray Angélico Chávez History Library
- Palace Press
- Photo Archives
