= Palace of the Governors =

Historic house in New Mexico, United States

- U.S. National Register of Historic Places
- U.S. National Historic Landmark
- U.S. Historic district – Contributing property
- NM State Register of Cultural Properties
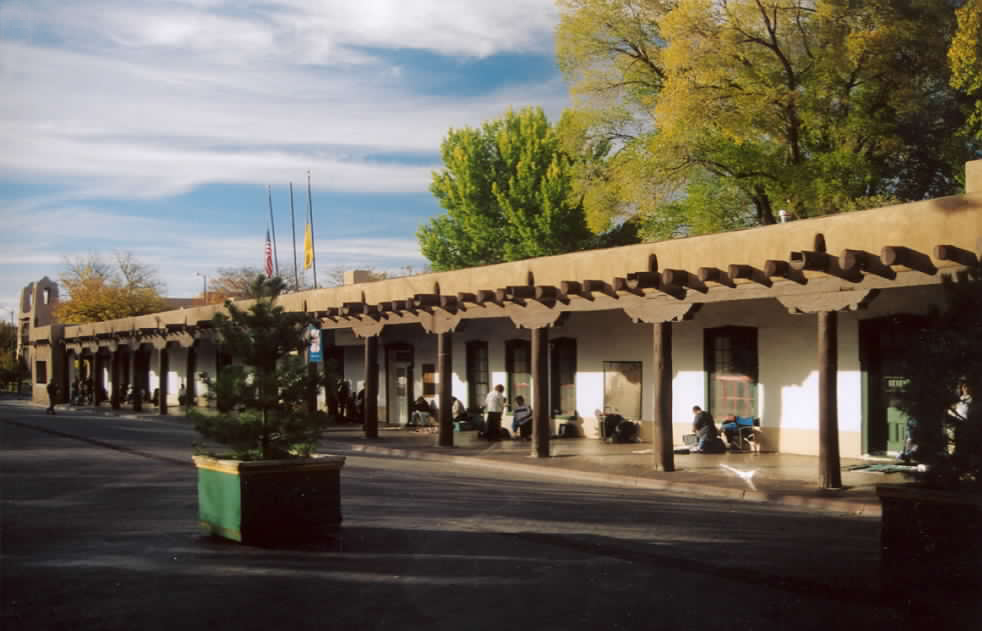
- Palace of the Governors
- Location: 120 Washington Avenue, Santa Fe, New Mexico
- Coordinates: 35°41′16″N 105°56′15″W
- Area: less than one acre
- Built: 1610
- Architectural style: Territorial Style Pueblo architecture
- Part of: Santa Fe Historic District (ID73001150)
- NRHP reference No.: 66000489
- NMSRCP No.: 17

Significant dates
- Added to NRHP: October 15, 1966
- Designated NHL: October 9, 1960
- Designated CP: July 23, 1973
- Designated NMSRCP: September 29, 1972

The Palace of the Governors (Spanish: Palacio de los Gobernadores) is an adobe structure built in the Territorial Style of Pueblo architecture on Palace Avenue in what was Santa Fe de Nuevo México and is now Santa Fe, New Mexico. Located within the Santa Fe Historic District along the Santa Fe Plaza between Lincoln and Washington avenues, it served as the seat of government for centuries, having been established as the capitol building of Nuevo México in 1610. It was New Mexico's seat of government until 1901.

== History ==
In 1610, Pedro de Peralta, the newly appointed governor of Santa Fe de Nuevo México covering most of the modern American Southwest, began construction on the Palace of the Governors, though some recent historical research has suggested that construction began midway through his term in 1618. In the following years, the Palace changed hands as the territory of New Mexico did, seeing the Pueblo Revolt of 1680, the Spanish return from 1693 to 1694, Mexican independence in 1821, American territorial status in 1848, and US statehood in 1912. The Palace originally served as the seat of government of the Spanish colony of Nuevo Mexico, which at one time comprised the present-day states of Texas, Arizona, Utah, Colorado, Nevada, and New Mexico. After the Mexican War of Independence, the Mexican province of Santa Fe de Nuevo México was administered from the Palace of the Governors. When New Mexico was annexed as a U.S. territory, the Palace became New Mexico's first territorial capitol.

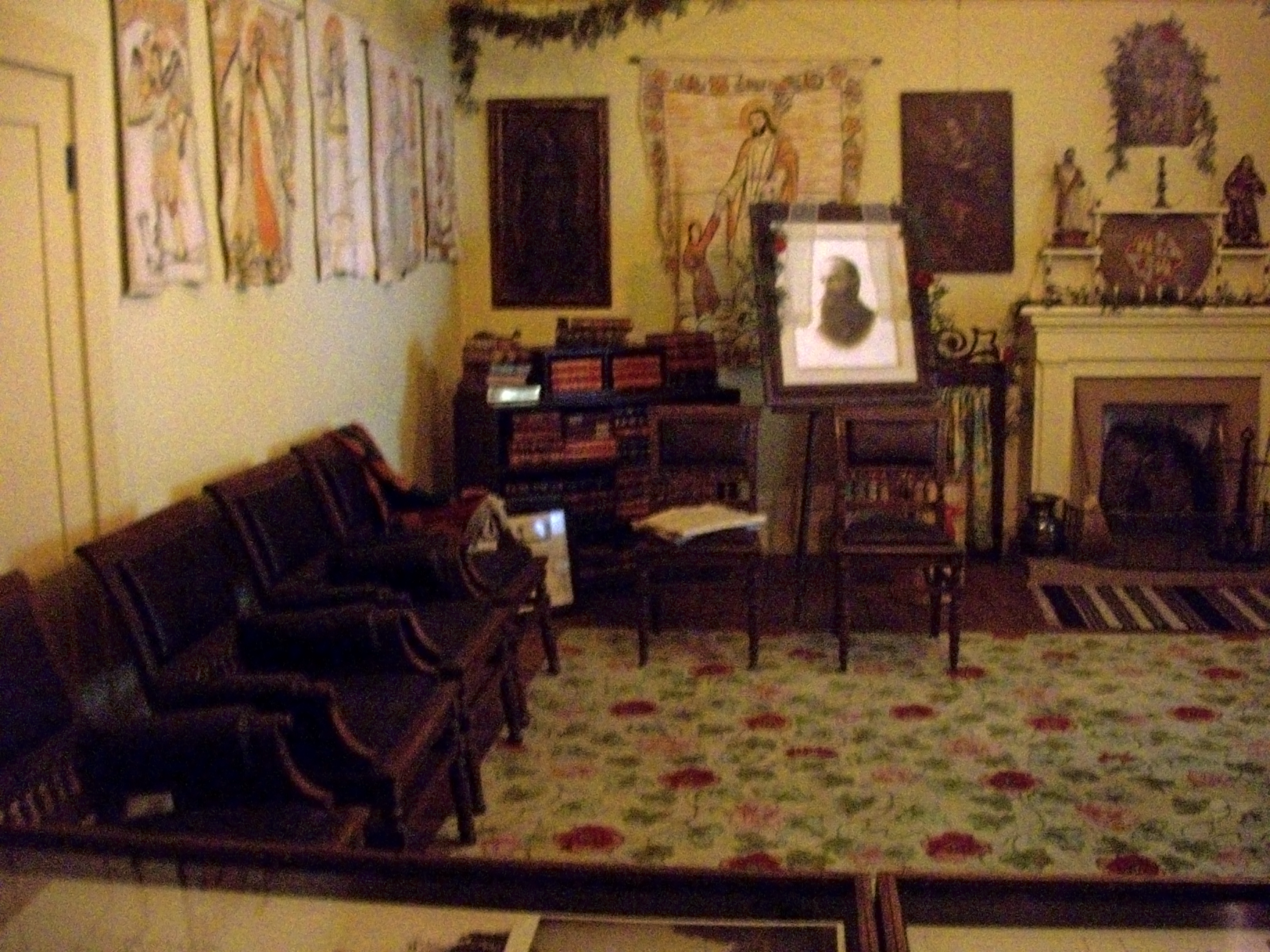
Territorial governor's office within the museum complex.

Lew Wallace wrote the final parts of his book Ben-Hur: A Tale of the Christ in this building while serving as territorial governor in the late 1870s. He remembered later in life that it was at night, during a severe thunderstorm in the spring of 1879, after returning from a tense meeting with Billy the Kid in Lincoln County, when he wrote the climactic Crucifixion scenes of the novel. Wallace worked by the light of a shaded lamp in the shuttered governor's study, fearing a bullet from outside over the tensions surrounding the Lincoln County War.

In 1909 anthropologist Dr. Edgar Lee Hewett invited the young archeologist Jesse L. Nusbaum to oversee the restoration of the Palace of the Governors that had fallen into disrepair. For this assignment, which was completed in the Fall of 1913, Jesse L. Nusbaum was hired as the first employee of the Dr. Edgar Lee Hewett led School of American Archaeology, later the School of American Research, and Museum of New Mexico in Santa Fe, New Mexico. In his journal, Nusbaum stressed the importance of melding the Palace architecture with the environment, noting that "the Palace was begun with an adaptation to climate and atmosphere and had been fitted into the color of earth and sky.", a view he later applied again as Superintendent of Mesa Verde National Park.

Between 1909, when the New Mexico territorial legislature established the Museum of New Mexico, and Summer 2009 the Palace of the Governors served as the site of the state history museum.

In 2009, the New Mexico History Museum was opened adjacent to the Palace, which is now one of eight museums overseen by the New Mexico Department of Cultural Affairs.

It was declared a National Historic Landmark in 1960.

The United States Postal Service issued a turquoise 1 1/4-cent stamp on June 17, 1960, featuring an image of the Palace. According to Steven J. Rod, "This was in coincidence with the opening day of Santa Fe's 350th anniversary celebration. The Palace is shown on the stamp from a front angle, a design which was taken from a photograph by Tyler Dingee of Santa Fe. The Governor's Palace stamp was the eighth 'national shrine' honored by this series."

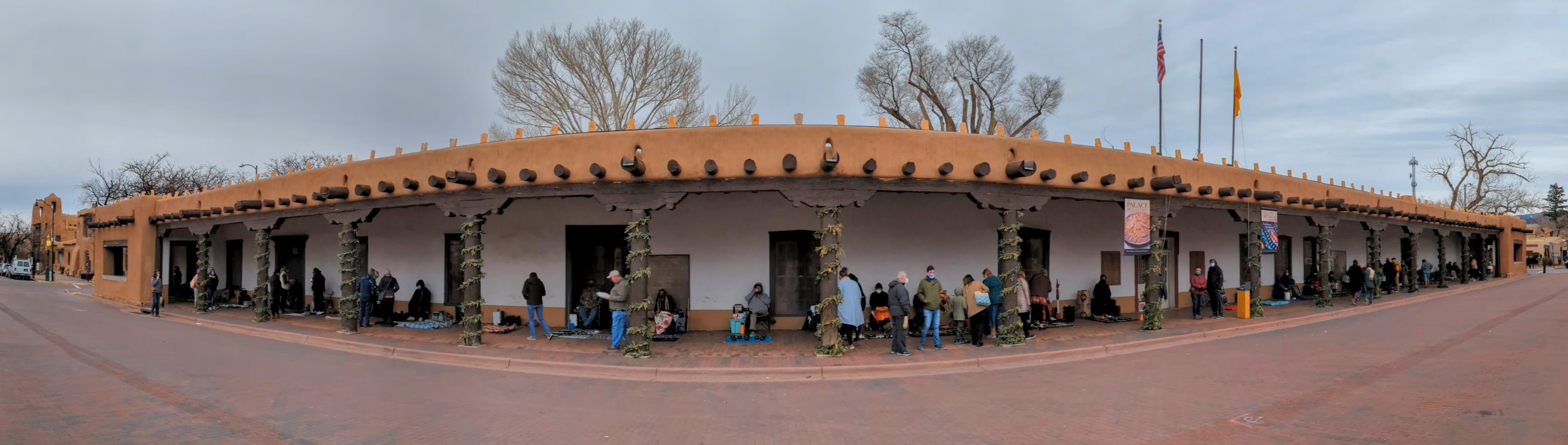
Palace of the Governors, panoramic view, with local traditional arts and crafts vendors

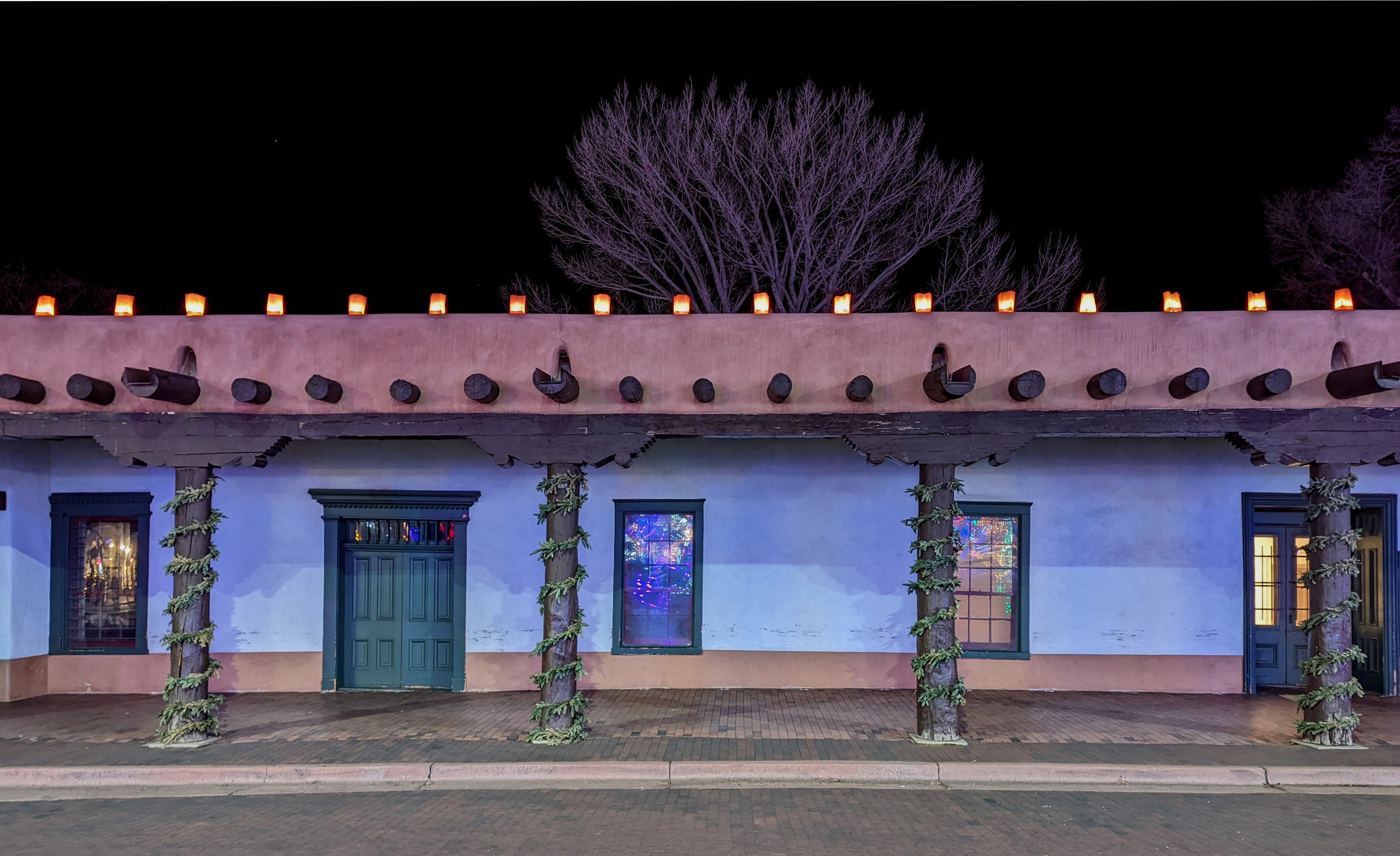
Night view, reflecting the Christmas lights of Santa Fe Plaza

== See also ==
- Spanish Governor's Palace
- Oldest buildings in the United States
- National Register of Historic Places listings in Santa Fe County, New Mexico
- List of National Historic Landmarks in New Mexico
