= Sandia Park, New Mexico =

- Census-designated place
- Location within New Mexico
- Coordinates: 35°10′02″N 106°22′18″W
- Country: United States
- State: New Mexico
- County: Bernalillo

Area
  - Total: 0.73 sq mi (1.88 km^{2})
  - Land: 0.73 sq mi (1.88 km^{2})
  - Water: 0 sq mi (0.00 km^{2})
- Elevation: 7,071 ft (2,155 m)

Population (2020)
  - Total: 265
  - Density: 365.6/sq mi (141.15/km^{2})
- Time zone: UTC-7 (Mountain (MST))
  - Summer (DST): UTC-6 (MDT)
- ZIP code: 87047
- Area code: 505
- GNIS feature ID: 2584204

Sandia Park is a census-designated place in Bernalillo County, New Mexico, United States. Its population was 237 as of the 2010 census and 265 as of the 2020 census. Sandia Park has a post office with ZIP code 87047.

Tinkertown Museum is an attraction in the area.

== Demographics ==
Historical population
Census	Pop.	Note	%±
2020	265		—
U.S. Decennial Census

== Education ==
It is zoned to Albuquerque Public Schools.
