= Central New Mexico =

Region in New Mexico, United States

Central New Mexico is the central region of the state of New Mexico. In the center of this region is Albuquerque, New Mexico, the largest city in the state.

== Communities ==
The top seven largest cities in Central New Mexico are:

1. Albuquerque
2. Rio Rancho
3. Los Lunas
4. Bernalillo
5. Socorro
6. Corrales
7. Belen
