= Tinkertown Museum =

Folk art museum in Sandia Park, New Mexico

Coordinates: 35°10′9″N 106°22′4″W

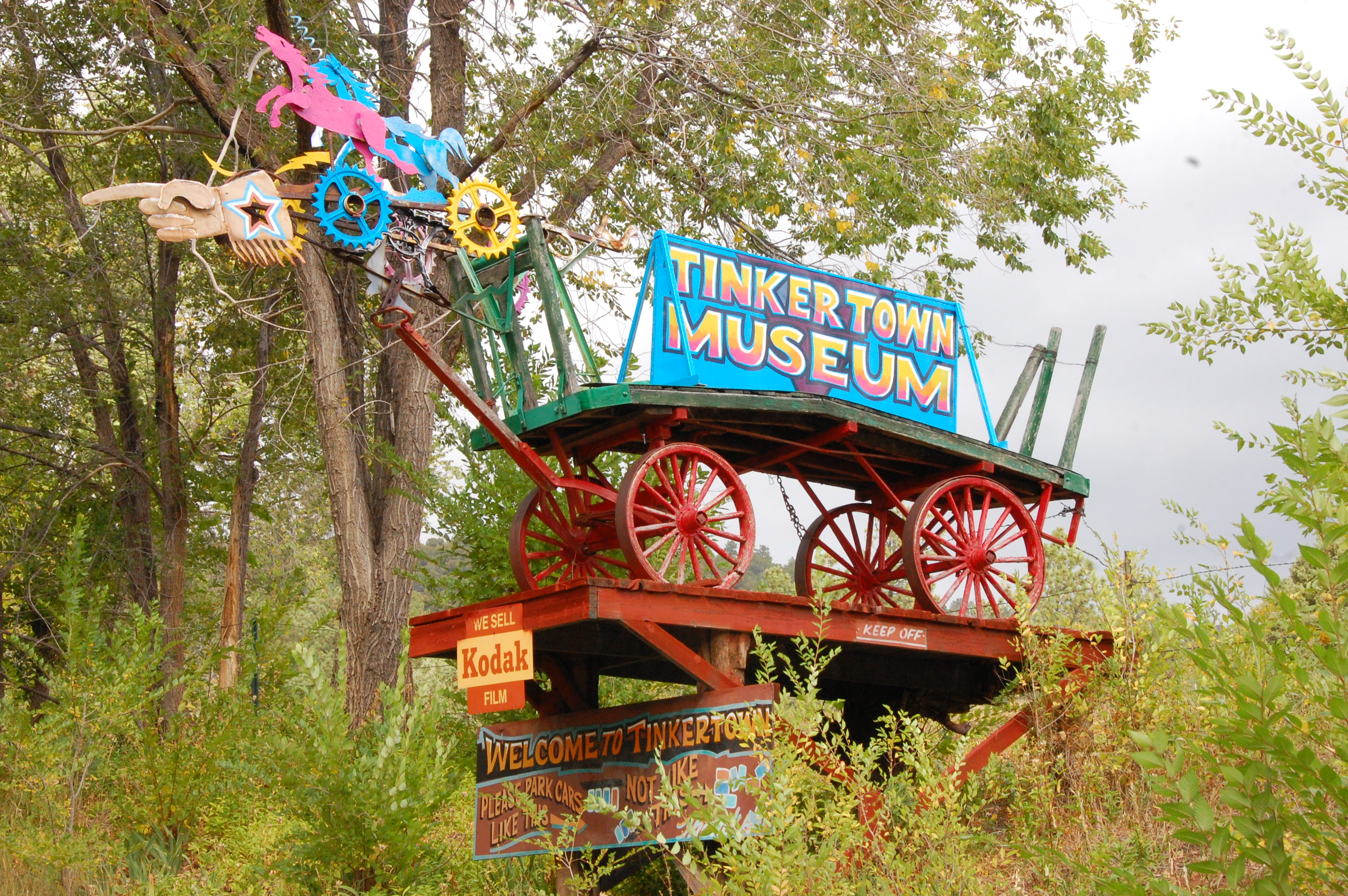
Tinkertown Museum sign

The Tinkertown Museum is a folk art museum in Sandia Park, New Mexico. The museum was founded by artist Ross Ward, and feature's Ward's hand-carved miniature Old West town, as well as a hand-carved circus, a collection of over 280 wedding cake toppers, tools, and other oddities, Ward's Jeep decorated in bottle caps and pennies, and a 35-foot antique sailboat, Theodora R, which circumnavigated the world from 1981 to 1991, piloted by Fritz Damler. The museum has been described as the "jumbled reflections of a wildly creative mind", and an "Americana wonderland of oddities".

== History and contents ==
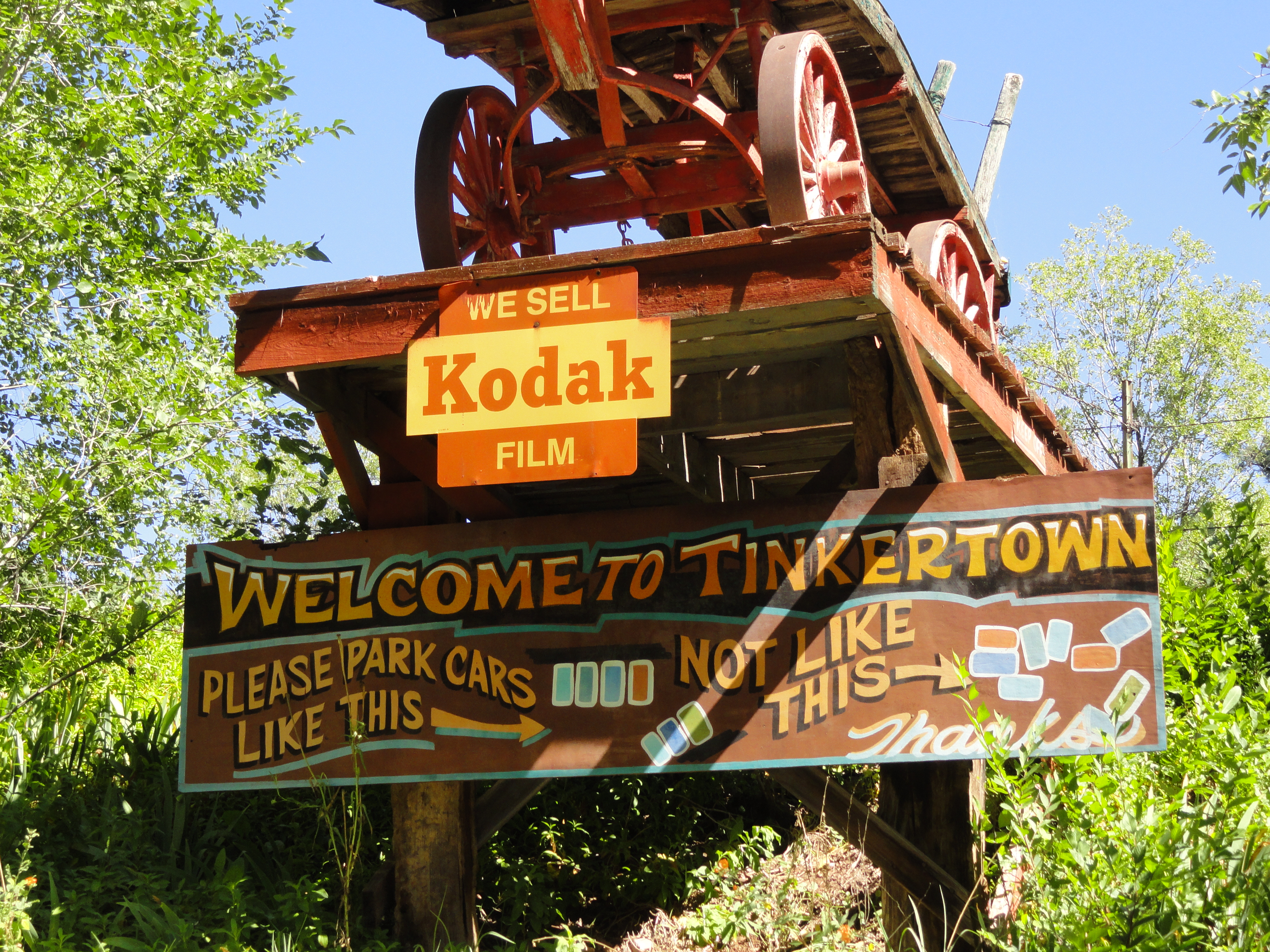
Tinkertown Museum signage

Ross Ward was born in Aberdeen, South Dakota in 1940. He was a self taught artist who began his career decorating store windows in Aberdeen at the age of 12. He went on to become a painter at the Horseless Carriage Museum in Rapid City, South Dakota. He traveled around, painting circus signs, restaurant signs and merry-go-rounds. He settled in New Mexico in 1968, and pursued the craft of wood carving. He originally displayed his carvings at the New Mexico State Fair. He began building Tinkertown in 1981.

Ward began carving the figures now on display in the museum in 1962, originally as a hobby which he occasionally displayed at fairs and carnivals. Ward opened the Tinkertown Museum in 1983. Ward built much of the museum building himself, out of more than 50,000 glass bottles held together by concrete. The museum contains several coin-operated machines, including Esmeralda the Fortune Teller and Otto the One Man Band.

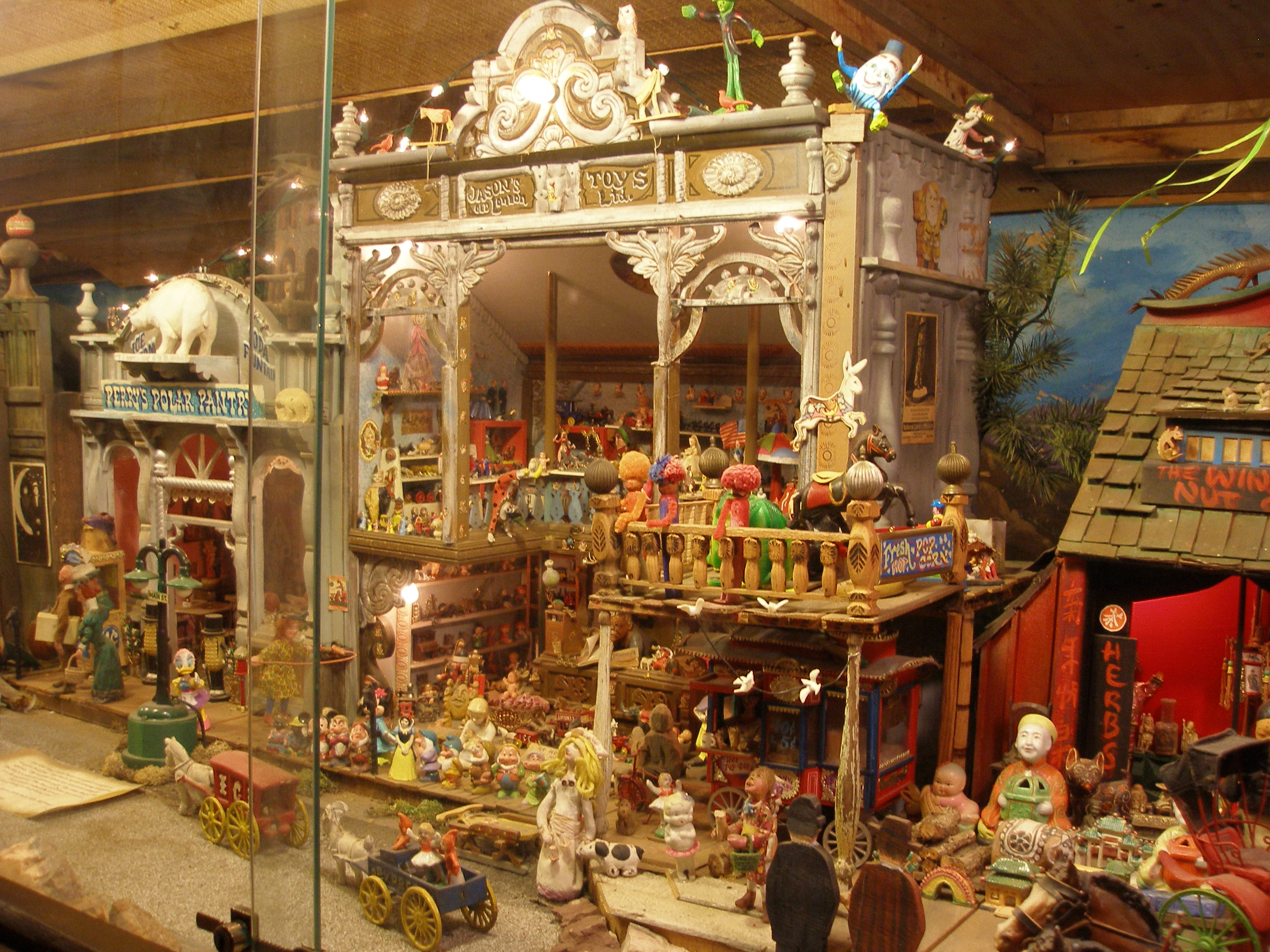
Miniature toy store carved by Ward

Ward's motto, displayed in his museum, was "I did all this while you were watching TV."

Ward was diagnosed with Alzheimer's disease in February 1998 at age 57. He began converting his Jeep Cherokee into an art piece covered in pennies and bottle caps once it became unsafe for him to drive. The Jeep is now on display at the museum.

He died of Alzheimer's at age 62, after spending the last 14 months of his life in a nursing home.

Ward was also a painter and sculptor, and his works are on display in Tinkertown, as well as elsewhere. His workshop is recreated in the museum. As of 2020, over 700,000 people had visited Tinkertown.

Ward's wife Carla wrote, "For Ross Ward, creating was like breathing—a natural and necessary expression of who he was. Using his remarkable stamina and natural abilities, every drawing, painting, carving, and sculpture reflects his creative energy captured in the moment – a snapshot of an electric, forward-flowing, artistic genius."
