= A:shiwi A:wan Museum and Heritage Center =

Coordinates: 35.065988°N 108.851729°W

- Established: 1992
- Location: 2 E. Ojo Caliente Road, Zuni, New Mexico, United States
- Website: www.ashiwi-museum.org

The A:shiwi A:wan Museum and Heritage Center is located in Zuni, New Mexico, United States. Jim Enote is the museum's executive director.

The Zuni tribe began planning the museum in the 1960s and 1970s. After struggling with funding, the museum became a 501(c)(3) nonprofit organization in 1992 and started out with one room of exhibits of Zuni life ways. Its current building was once a trading post, called the Hebadina Building.

A permanent exhibit, "The Hawikku: 'Echoes From Our Past'" educates visitors about creation, migrations, and the last 500 years of Zuni history. Photographs from the 19th century up to the 21st century illustrate Zuni life. On the grounds are traditional Zuni waffle gardens created through a partnership of the museum and the Zuni Farmers Co-operative.

The museum cohosts the Zuni Festival of Arts and Culture every May with the Museum of Northern Arizona.
