= Arroyo Hondo Pueblo =

- U.S. National Register of Historic Places
- NM State Register of Cultural Properties
- Nearest city: Santa Fe, New Mexico
- Area: 12 acres (4.9 ha)
- Built: 1300
- NRHP reference No.: 07000950
- NMSRCP No.: 1901

Significant dates
- Added to NRHP: September 13, 2007
- Designated NMSRCP: October 13, 2006

Arroyo Hondo Pueblo was a pueblo in the upper Rio Grande valley, New Mexico. First occupied in the 13th century, the complex grew rapidly, and at its peak in the 14th century contained up to a thousand rooms; it has been called a "pueblo boomtown". However, it was short-lived, and the site was abandoned by about 1425.

The pueblo has been the subject of a major archaeological research project since the 1970s, directed by Douglas W. Schwartz. It was listed in the United States National Register of Historic Places in 2007.

== Location and environment ==
Arroyo Hondo Pueblo is situated atop the Arroyo Hondo gorge, a tributary of the Santa Fe River, about 8 km southeast of the city of Santa Fe, New Mexico. It is on the northeastern edge of the upper Rio Grande river basin, in the foothills of the Sangre de Cristo Mountains.

Coordinates: 35.6213°N 105.9326°W

== See also ==
- National Register of Historic Places listings in Santa Fe County, New Mexico
