= Amelia Elizabeth White and Martha Root White =

American philanthropic sisters

Amelia Elizabeth White Martha Root White
- Elizabeth and Martha White with four of their Irish wolfhounds
- Born: 1878 (Amelia Elizabeth White)
- Died: 1972 (aged 93–94); 1937
- Occupations: Philanthropists; socialite

Amelia Elizabeth White (1878–1972) and Martha Root White (died 1937), also known as The White Sisters, were sibling philanthropists and socialites born in New York, who settled in Santa Fe, New Mexico and championed for Indigenous people's land and cultural rights. They were "avid supporters of Indigenous arts", and were known in the region as a "powerhouse of reform in Native issues."

Amelia Elizabeth was primarily known as Elizabeth during her lifetime.

== Early life and education ==
The White sisters were born to the journalist Horace White and his wife. White was the editor in chief of the New York Evening Post, and prior to that the Chicago Tribune. The sisters both attended Bryn Mawr College and served in France with the Belgian forces as nurse assistants.

== Biography ==
The sisters donated the land where the Wheelwright Museum of the American Indian was built. Their philanthropic work also included funding the School for Advanced Research, the Indian Arts Fund, the Old Santa Fe Association as well as the civic organization, the DeVargas Development Company. Additionally Elizabeth donated a large collection of San Ildefonso Pueblo pottery to the collection of the School for Advanced Research, as well as the land where the campus is located. Elizabeth also donated land for the Santa Fe Folk Art Museum, the Laboratory of Anthropology and the Museum of Navajo Ceremonial Art. Additionally she was a benefactor of the Detroit Art Institute, the Cleveland Museum of Art and the Corcoran Gallery.

The sisters had an affinity for Rathmullan Irish Wolfhounds and Kandahar Afghan hounds which they raised in a "state-of-the-art kennel" on their estate at El Delirio. Elizabeth was a dog breeder and founded the first animal shelter in Santa Fe, and helped to develop and fund the "Dogs for Defense" program in New Mexico as part of the WWII sentry in conjunction with the U.S. Army.

== El Delirio estate ==
The sisters constructed a home in the 1920s at 660 Garcia Street in Santa Fe that they named El Delirio (The Madness) where they held elaborate costume parties for Santa Fe artists and society gatherings. Named after the sister's favorite Andalusian bar in Sevilla, Spain, the El Delirio estate was originally developed on an eight-acre parcel as a summer home for the sisters. It was designed by local artist, William Penhallow Henderson in the Spanish Pueblo Revival style of architecture. When Elizabeth died she bequeathed El Delirio and other properties she owned to the School for Advanced Research.

== Legacy ==
The Amelia White Park on Old Santa Fe Trail was named for Amelia Elizabeth. In 1959, the sisters first deeded the land to the Santa Fe Women's Club and Library Association to establish a clubhouse, however in 1961 the property was returned to Elizabeth who then gave it to the city of Santa Fe to establish a memorial park commemorating those who fought in the Korean Conflict. In the 1980s the park held Shakespere in the Park performances. In 1995, the park was granted certification by the National Park Service as part of the Santa Fe National Historic Trail.
