= Edgar Lee Hewett =

American anthropologist and archaeologist

- As president of New Mexico Normal University in 1898
- Born: November 23, 1865; Warren County, Illinois
- Died: December 31, 1946 (aged 81); Albuquerque, New Mexico
- Education: D.Sc.
- Occupations: Archaeologist, anthropologist
- Spouse(s): Cora Whitford, Donizetta Jones Wood

Edgar Lee Hewett (November 23, 1865 – December 31, 1946) was an American archaeologist and anthropologist whose focus was the Native American communities of New Mexico and the southwestern United States. He is best known for his role in gaining passage of the Antiquities Act, a pioneering piece of legislation for the conservation movement; as the founder and first director of the Museum of New Mexico; and as the first president of the New Mexico Normal School, now New Mexico Highlands University.

Hewett's dealings with Maria Martinez, the matriarch potter of San Ildefonso Pueblo, were instrumental in establishing San Ildefonso as a center for Native American pottery. He helped stimulate the rebirth of pottery as a significant folk art form in the region.

Hewett also had a significant role in the formation of Bandelier National Monument and Chaco Culture National Historical Park, established to preserve extensive prehistoric ruins of the Pueblo people whom he studied. The Antiquities Act, which he had worked on, authorized the establishment by the executive branch of such national monuments.

== Early years ==
Hewett was born in Warren County, Illinois, on November 23, 1865. He was educated at Tarkio College in Missouri and thereafter settled in Florence, Colorado, as a member of the school system. He eventually became superintendent of the Florence schools. In 1894 he became a member of the faculty of the Colorado State Normal School in Greeley, Colorado (today the University of Northern Colorado), where he received a master's degree in 1893.

Hewett's 1891 marriage to Cora Whitford proved eventful for his eventual career and prominence. Cora was described in contemporary accounts as "frail"—frequently (and almost certainly in this case) a euphemism for a person suffering tuberculosis—and at her doctors' advice, the Hewetts started to spend time in the warmer climate of northern New Mexico. Tuberculosis was considered incurable as antibiotics had not been discovered. As a result, Edgar Hewett was exposed to, and became fascinated by, the prehistoric ruins in Frijoles Canyon near Santa Fe—a site that would eventually become the centerpiece attraction of Bandelier National Monument.

== Pajarito Plateau ==
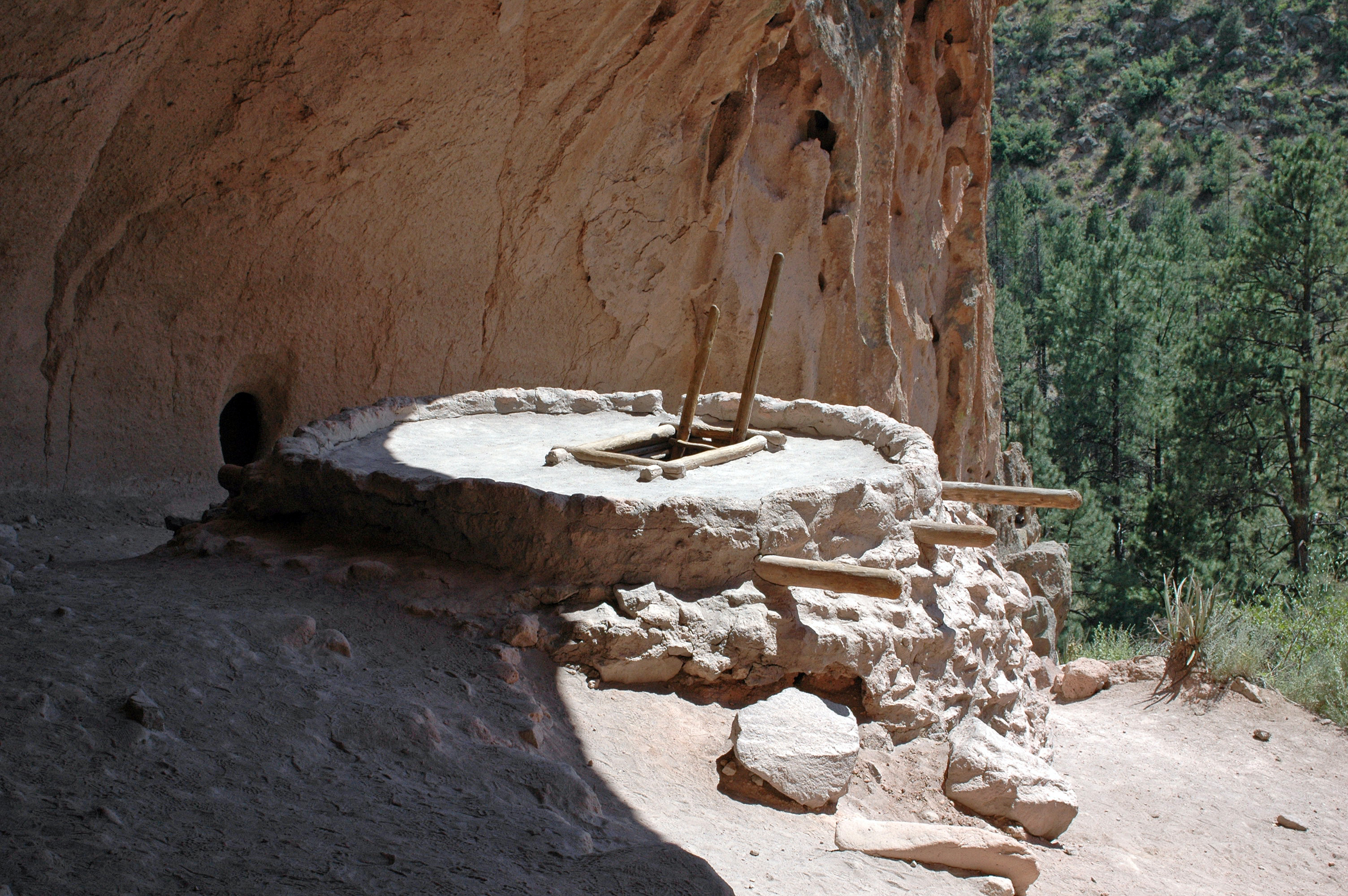
Alcove House, Frijoles Canyon. A similar photograph appears in Hewett's 1943 book

Hewett's interest in Frijoles Canyon was timely, for ethnologist Adolph Bandelier had just started to describe, through both scientific papers and his novel The Delight Makers (1890), prehistoric life on the Pajarito Plateau. Hewett came to know Bandelier and consider him his mentor in his own studies. By 1896 Hewett himself was conducting field work on the Plateau, although he continued to defer to Bandelier's expertise on the region for many years.

Hewett rapidly came to believe that the Plateau's archaeological sites constituted a national resource that should be preserved, and in the 1890s he advocated creation of a "Pajarito National Park" that would protect essentially the entire Plateau. However, the time was not yet ripe for such a step. Contemporary agriculture on the Plateau was not exactly widespread, but such as it was, the ranchers relied upon it for sustenance, and perceived a threat to their economic well-being if the land was put off limits to ranching and farming. (Many years later, Valles Caldera National Preserve was established in the adjoining Jemez Mountains with language that explicitly mandated promoting the economic interests of the region in terms of agriculture and forestry though that law was replaced by new legislation in 2015 moving the Valles Caldera National Preserve to the National Park Service without the economic language.) These pressures, combined with opposition from Santa Clara Pueblo, prevented Pajarito National Park from being approved at that time.

== New Mexico Normal School ==
In 1893 the New Mexico territorial legislature, anticipating the day when the Territory would achieve statehood, authorized the founding of a normal school at Las Vegas, New Mexico. The New Mexico Normal School, as it was originally called (renamed New Mexico Normal University in 1902, later becoming New Mexico Highlands University as it is today), took some time to form, but was ready for its first class of students in 1898. By this time Hewett had achieved a modicum of fame, at least locally, and had become friendly with some of the power brokers who were behind the creation of the Normal School. He was appointed in 1897 as the first president of the New Mexico Normal School.

Hewett's time at the head of the Normal School can be viewed as generally successful. The college was organized along conventional lines for normal colleges, and commenced with several areas of pedagogy directed to the production of degreed teachers, who were needed by the state-to-be. The enrollment increased rapidly and for a time exceeded that of the University of New Mexico in Albuquerque. However, Hewett fell afoul of some of the powerful figures of the region who disagreed with his increasingly vocal position that the archaeological resources of New Mexico Territory required preservation. He was also criticized for an "unconventional" approach to pedagogy—a euphemism for his enthusiasm for taking students into the field (at the Pajarito Plateau) at summer camps, a highly innovative practice at the time and one that reinforced the concerns that his critics had about his enthusiasm for preserving the sites there. Particularly contentious was that he included women in his field camps. By early 1903 he was pressured out of the president's office. Hewett is the namesake for buildings at today's New Mexico Highlands University.

Hewett's interest in the Pajarito Plateau intensified during his time at the Normal School. He enlisted students at the Normal School in the surveying of the Plateau, which gave him a basis for putting his studies there on a more scientific footing. He also learned the value of working "the smoke-filled room" to achieve support for his goals. This was one of the traits that set him apart from his contemporaries such as Richard Wetherill, and his skills contributed to the next phase of his career.

== Antiquities Act ==
Upon stepping down from his position at the Normal School, Hewett decided that he needed to improve his academic credentials in order to advance. He earned a doctorate in anthropology from the University of Geneva in 1904. He spent little time in residence at the university, developing his dissertation mainly by collating a number of papers which he had written previously (a practice that, in the eyes of Hewett's many critics, would characterize and compromise much of his later writing as well) and having them translated into the required French. The resulting dissertation, bearing the title Les Communautés anciennes dans le desert Americain, was favorably received, and sufficed to earn Hewett his degree despite his inability to defend it in the customary French.

Meanwhile, the political landscape that had prevented the creation of the Pajarito National Park was starting to change. John F. Lacey, a congressman from Iowa, had visited northern New Mexico in 1902 to see the effects of pot hunting on ancient sites, and had enlisted Hewett as a guide. He was so impressed that he retained Hewett to report to Congress on the archaeological resources of the region.

By this time Hewett had become more adept at working the political system, and his skills were starting to show some results, frictions at the Normal School notwithstanding. He had traveled to Washington, D.C. in 1900 (no small journey at the time) and befriended the prominent anthropologist Alice Cunningham Fletcher among others. In 1902, he wrote a pointed complaint about the pot-hunting practices, which he believed were destroying resources at Chaco Canyon. Wetherill and the Hyde Expedition were forbidden to excavate there.

This set the stage for Hewett to deliver a truly influential report to Congress—and he delivered. On September 3, 1904, freshly back from Geneva, Hewett submitted to the United States General Land Office (GLO), which at this time had jurisdiction over government lands in the Southwest, a "Memorandum concerning the historic and prehistoric ruins of Arizona, New Mexico, Colorado, and Utah, and their preservation." This report rapidly made its way to Congress and Lacey, who was moved by Hewett's declaration in the Memorandum that "it will be a lasting reproach upon our Government if it does not use its power to restrain" the destruction of the ruins.

Hewett spent most of late 1904 and 1905 shuttling between Washington and New Mexico, helping Lacey with a nascent Act of Congress at the one and continuing his archaeological fieldwork at the other. This was a time of personal misfortune for him, however, as Cora Hewett's illness had become terminal. While in Geneva, she had to use a wheelchair much of the time; after their return to the United States, she entered a sanatorium in Santa Fe, New Mexico for a time. She died in the fall of 1905. Hewett kept on working.

The result was the Antiquities Act of 1906, a towering piece of American legislation by any standards. As a result of the Antiquities Act, it was now no longer necessary for Congress to authorize permanent withdrawal of land for the purpose of preservation of cultural or other resources; a presidential proclamation would now suffice. This apparent short-circuiting of separation of powers was controversial at the time, and has remained so for the 100 years since its passage, but Lacey's experienced hand guided the bill through Congress, meeting the objections of its critics and propelling it toward passage and presidential signature. President Theodore Roosevelt signed the Antiquities Act into law on June 8, 1906, and Hewett's place in the history of the conservation movement was secured. Ironically, Roosevelt's first use of the Antiquities Act was not to protect one of the ruins that Hewett had made his life's passion, but rather to establish Devil's Tower National Monument in Wyoming, a site of more geological and scenic interest than archaeological significance. However, the Act would soon be put, repeatedly and vigorously, to its (or at least Hewett's) intended purpose.

== Building the national monuments ==
The first archaeological site to be preserved under the Antiquities Act was the Arizona complex that would become the centerpiece of the eponymous Montezuma Castle National Monument. Hewett knew of Montezuma Castle from his work inventorying the Southwest for the GLO and Lacey, and he knew that it was not only archaeologically significant but also imperiled by aggressive pot hunting (sometimes using dynamite to knock down walls so that rooms within could be excavated). Hewett lent his support to the creation of this national monument, which came into being in 1907.

Montezuma Castle was a relatively uncontroversial site, being small, remote, and not heavily (or at least profitably) exploited by either the pot hunters or agriculture in the vicinity, some temporary de facto restrictions on the pot hunting having already come into being before the monument was created. It was therefore a good test case for Hewett's vision as embodied in the Antiquities Act, and creation of the national monument caused comparatively few complaints. Another site closer to home that Hewett had studied, at today's Gila Cliff Dwellings National Monument in southwestern New Mexico, would soon follow, and by the end of 1907, Chaco Canyon itself had been made a national monument, thus preserving the most extensive site of ruins of the Pueblo culture. However, Hewett was not satisfied; he had his eye on other extensive and significant candidates for preservation, notably his long-time favorites on the Pajarito Plateau, that promised to be more controversial. He therefore turned his attention to the problems of getting these sites preserved, as the number of national monuments created under the Antiquities Act began to climb.

In 1907 the Archaeological Institute of America gave Hewett an additional platform, by establishing the School of American Archaeology, later the School of American Research, in Santa Fe. Hewett's friend Alice Fletcher, by then the doyenne of American archaeology, was one of the prime backers of the School; Hewett became its first director, a position he would hold until his death in 1946. The School would provide Hewett not only with a mouthpiece, but also a base for his increasingly professional (if still controversial) research activities and students and collaborators to do the work.

The process of preserving the sites of the Pajarito Plateau proved difficult and time-consuming, partly because interactions among the affected parties were complex, and partly because when Roosevelt passed the reins of government to William Howard Taft, enthusiasm in the White House for preserving such sites was diminished. Another factor had to do with Hewett's own personality. He had many supporters, but also many critics, and some of the latter complained that his real goal was to ensure that he, Edgar L. Hewett, D.Sc., Director of the School of American Research, would have access to, and control of, the Plateau's sites—while his rivals would not. Negotiations over a new monument were long and contentious, but finally, on February 11, 1916, President Woodrow Wilson proclaimed the new Bandelier National Monument, naming it for Adolph Bandelier who had died recently. The monument was rather smaller than Hewett had hoped, covering only Frijoles Canyon, some comparatively empty land to the southwest, and an outlier (now Tsankawi), and omitting among others the very significant Puye Cliff Dwellings near Santa Clara Pueblo. However, even the most ardent preservationists had to admit that, from the standpoint of protecting Puebloan sites, Bandelier was much better than nothing.

== Native American art ==
Hewett continued to take an interest in the Pajarito Plateau and its environs, not merely from an archaeological perspective but also from a contemporary one. Many of the Plateau's excavations contained intriguing fragments, and sometimes intact pieces, of pottery, some of it of considerable beauty. Pottery of a more "modern" nature was produced at some of the pueblos of the region in the first part of the 20th century, but it was intended for the tourist trade, and had little to do with the pottery of antiquity. The artifacts found during the excavations provided evidence that the Native Americans of the region could do better at making pottery.

Shortly after the first World War, an opportunity arose to revive the high-quality work of antiquity, driven as much by Hewett's curiosity about the potters of the past as anything else. He made the acquaintance of a potter at San Ildefonso Pueblo named Maria Martinez—a name that would become a watchword in Native American art. Hewett set Maria and her husband Julian, at that point proficient artisans in a polychrome style of pottery common at San Ildefonso, the task of trying to reproduce the colors and textures seen in the ancestral work of Frijoles Canyon and its vicinity. Almost serendipitously, the Martinezes developed a "black-on-black" style that not only evoked the ancient work but also produced pieces attractive to the modern collector. Hewett, in conjunction with the eccentric entrepreneurs and philanthropists Vera von Blumenthal and Rose Dougan, detected in this pottery a commercial opportunity that the puebleños would go on to develop into a major and economically significant cottage industry in the region. The Santa Fe Indian Market, probably the world's leading exposition for Native American art, has an economic impact on northern New Mexico estimated at nearly $20,000,000 annually. San Ildefonso (and Santa Clara) black-on-black pottery, some of it by descendants of Maria and Julian Martinez, features prominently to this day among the "Best of Show" award winners at the Market, as well as more pedestrian but still high-quality work that has far transcended the tourist trinkets that were being produced in the pueblos at the beginning of the 20th century.

== Academic life ==
The School of American Archaeology (later School of American Research, and now the School for Advanced Research, or SAR) lost little time in establishing itself not merely as a platform for its director, but also as a center for the development of professional archaeologists. Its first professional papers were published the year it opened. Neil Judd, Alfred V. Kidder, Sylvanus Morley, and Earl Morris were among the prominent archaeologists who spent time there, Judd and Kidder in particular contributing to the excavations of many of the same sites that had interested Hewett.

These educational successes aside, Hewett's appointment at the School ruffled feathers among the old school of American archaeology, which was largely centered on the East Coast and took a decidedly condescending stance toward the "amateur" Hewett, Alice Fletcher's backing notwithstanding. One of his most vocal critics was Franz Boas, who had started the first archaeology PhD program in the United States at Columbia University in New York. Boas and several of his colleagues wanted to control the School and the education it afforded its students, and to have the "incompetent" Hewett sacked. Local pressures sufficed to keep him in the job, and eventually Boas and colleagues were placated through formation of a similar institute in Mexico City.

In 1909 another action of the territorial legislature created the Museum of New Mexico. Hewett was a logical choice to be its first director, and was installed in the position. The enabling legislation mandated that the museum be managed by the SAR, helping to solidify Hewett's grasp on both positions. Hewett staffed the museum's administrative functions with several of his friends and supporters from the Normal School days, and persuaded Alice Fletcher to take a key advisory role as well. In addition he hired two other women, Marjorie Ferguson (later Lambert; 1908–2006) and Bertha P. Dutton (1903–1994), after he had trained them at the University of New Mexico. This of course exposed him to complaints from his critics about cronyism, but ensured that he at least had a stable power base within the institution. The museum was empowered by the legislature to acquire land containing some key archaeological sites in the state that were not yet protected by the Antiquities Act, and under Hewett, it did so.

Hewett was able to commingle public (Museum) and private (SAR) resources as he saw fit, but the arrangement was a matter of concern and in 1959 the two institutions were forced to separate. Today, the Museum of New Mexico is a subdivision of the New Mexico Department of Cultural Affairs.

Hewett remarried in 1911, to Donizetta Jones Wood, who would survive him. During this period he continued to do field work, his growing reputation ensuring that he would be invited to join expeditions ranging far beyond the Southwest. He also continued his politicking; not satisfied with Bandelier National Monument (even though it expanded beyond the land in the original proclamation), he continued to lobby for creation of a Pajarito National Park. Nothing came of this advocacy, however.

As time passed, Hewett's academic credentials came to be more recognized, and he spent time and effort building academic archaeology in the western United States. He organized archaeology and anthropology departments at the University of New Mexico and University of Southern California. The UNM department, where Hewett spent much of the latter part of his life, would eventually become one of the world's best known. While at UNM, Hewett founded the Museum of Anthropology of the University of New Mexico, which would later become the Maxwell Museum of Anthropology.

His collaborations with other archaeologists also increased with the passage of time. By 1910 he was collaborating with the Smithsonian Institution on work in Frijoles Canyon; Neil Judd was one of the students there. By 1915 he was director of exhibits for the Panama–California Exposition in San Diego, responsible for assembling the central exhibit "The Story of Man through the Ages". This led in turn to his assuming directorship of the San Diego Museum of Man, which was created as a permanent institution from the exposition's collections established by Hewett. This museum survives today as one of the institutions in San Diego's Balboa Park district.

Hewett's increasing ties to university life exposed him to the "publish or perish" mindset of academia, and here the results were less flattering to Hewett than many of his earlier activities. Much of his later work, or at least his publications, became somewhat repetitive. His 1943 book Ancient Life in the American Southwest, cited below, amounts to a rehashing of a lifetime of archaeology without contributing anything new, and most of it could have been written at least 20 years earlier. Its tone also strikes the modern reader as annoyingly patronizing to (yet still respectful of) the people he studied, but Hewett was, after all, a product of his times.

== Later years ==
Hewett continued to work as a field archaeologist practically until his death. He played a major role in securing funding for the excavation of Kuaua pueblo ruins, helping to preserve the murals with the aid of Wesley Bliss, but he drove a reconstruction of the site as if it were a set of ruins, as a setting for the commemoration of the four hundredth anniversary of Coronado's arrival in New Mexico. However, by the 1930s his basically romantic approach to field work was looking like more and more of an anachronism. His responsibilities at the University of New Mexico grew less demanding (and conspicuous) over time, although he retained directorship of the Chaco Canyon field school, a particular favorite of his, until 1937. He continued in his roles at the SAR and the Museum of New Mexico until the last year of his life, chairing the joint meeting of the managing board in August 1946.

Edgar Lee Hewett died on December 31, 1946. His ashes are interred at the New Mexico Museum of Art in Santa Fe, one of the units of the Museum of New Mexico that he helped create, next to those of his long-time friend and supporter Alice Fletcher.

== Works ==
- Hewett, Edgar L. Government supervision of historic and prehistoric ruins. 1904.
- Hewett, Edgar L. A General View of the Archeology of the Pueblo Region. Washington, DC: Smithsonian Institution, 1905.
- Hewett, Edgar L. Antiquities of the Jemez Plateau, New Mexico. Washington, DC: Smithsonian Institution, 1906.
- Hewett, Edgar L. The Groundwork Of American Archaeology. Archaeological Institute of America, 1908.
- Hewett, Edgar L. The Pajaritan Culture. Archaeological Institute of America, 1909.
- Hewett, Edgar L.; Henderson, Junius and Robbins, Wilfred W. The Physiography of the Rio Grande Valley, New Mexico, in Relation to Pueblo Culture. Washington, DC: Smithsonian Institution, 1913.
- Hewett, Edgar L. Ancient life in the American Southwest. Indianapolis: Bobbs-Merrill, 1930.
- Hewett, Edgar L. Ancient Life in Mexico and Central America. Indianapolis: Bobbs-Merrill, 1936.
- Hewett, Edgar L. The Chaco Canyon and its monuments. Albuquerque: The University of New Mexico Press, 1936.
- Bandelier, Adolf F. and Hewett, Edgar L. Indians Of The Rio Grande Valley. Albuquerque: The University of New Mexico Press, 1937.
- Hewett, Edgar L. "Ancient Andean Life". Indianapolis: Bobbs-Merrill, 1939
- Hewett, Edgar L. and Mauzy, Wayne L. Landmarks of New Mexico. Albuquerque: The University of New Mexico Press, 1940.
- Hewett, Edgar L. From Culture To Civilization. Archaeological Institute of America, 1942.
- Hewett, Edgar L. Campfire and Trail. Albuquerque: The University of New Mexico Press, 1943.
- Hewett, Edgar L. Man in the Pageant of the Ages. Albuquerque: The University of New Mexico Press, 1943.
- Hewett, Edgar L. and Fisher, Reginald. Mission Monuments of New Mexico. Albuquerque: The University of New Mexico Press, 1943.
- Hewett, Edgar L. "The Limits of Idealism." In El Palacio, Vol. 50, No. 4 (April 1943), 77–86. Santa Fe: The Museum of New Mexico, 1943.
- Hewett, Edgar L. Man and Culture. Albuquerque: The University of New Mexico Press, 1944.
- Hewett, Edgar L. Man and The State. Albuquerque: The University of New Mexico Press, 1944.
- Hewett, Edgar L., Dutton, Bertha P. and Harrington. John P. The Pueblo Indian World: Studies on the Natural History of the Rio Grande Valley in Relation to Pueblo Indian Culture. Albuquerque: The University of New Mexico and the School of American Research, 1945.
- Hewett, Edgar L. Two score years. Albuquerque: The University of New Mexico Press, 1946.
