= Martha White (computer scientist) =

Canadian computer scientist

Martha White is a Canadian computer scientist, an associate professor of computing science and Canada Research Chair in Reinforcement Learning at the University of Alberta, Canada CIFAR AI Chair and Fellow at the Alberta Machine Intelligence Institute (Amii), and co-founder of RL Core Technologies. Her research concerns reinforcement learning and representation learning for adaptive autonomous agents, including Temporal difference learning and optimization in semisupervised and unsupervised learning.

== Education and career ==
White was a student at the University of Alberta, where she received double bachelor's degrees in mathematics and computing science in 2008, a master's degree in computing science in 2009, and a Ph.D. in computing science in 2014, jointly supervised by Michael Bowling and Dale Schuurmans.

She joined Indiana University Bloomington as an assistant professor in 2015, and returned to the University of Alberta in 2017. She was promoted to associate professor in 2020. She was given a Canada CIFAR AI Chair in 2018, renewed in 2024, and given a (tier 2) Canada Research Chair in Reinforcement Learning in 2024.

== Recognition ==
White was one of three AI Researchers of the Year named in the 2023 Women in AI Awards North America. She was named to the College of New Scholars, Artists and Scientists of the Royal Society of Canada in 2024.
