= El Camino Real Historic Trail Site =

Former New Mexico museum

Coordinates: 33.595711°N 107.094694°W

The El Camino Real Historic Trail Site was a center about the culture and history about the El Camino Real trail and the colonization of New Mexico. The center, an official New Mexico Historic Site, opened in 2005 and closed in 2016. The Center featured exhibit panels and artifacts about the people who traveled along the trail, the desert and life in the 18th century.

== Mission ==
The center commemorated the heritage of the antiquated road that connected Mexico City with Santa Fe, New Mexico in the region once known as New Spain.

The center was operated by the New Mexico Department of Cultural Affairs until it closed. The US Bureau of Land Management and the countries of Spain and Mexico contributed to the project. The facility was completed in 2005 and was designed by Dekker / Perich / Sabatini Architects and Engineers of Albuquerque. The museum closed permanently in November 2016.

== Location ==
It was situated approximately halfway between the cities of Albuquerque, New Mexico and El Paso, Texas. It was accessible from Interstate 25 at exit 115, approximately 35 miles (56 km) south of Socorro, New Mexico.

Former New Mexico House of Representatives member Don Tripp praised the design of the museum while being sharply critical of the decision to site it "in the middle of nowhere." Former Socorro mayor Ravi Bhasker attributed the museum's failure to its inconvenient location, labeling as "impossible" consultants' projections of 100,000 visitors per year. Actual visitor figures were below 8,000 per year.

Demolition of the museum complex commenced in July 2026. The state officials say that the site will be returned to the Bureau of Land Management and the land will restored to pristine condition.

== Displays ==
The site featured a display of non-motorized travel aimed at providing modern motorists with an appreciation for the difficulty of traversing the desert environment. An outdoor amphitheater featured traditional music heard along the journey reflecting the diverse folkways that developed as many cultures met on the legendary trade route.
