= School for Advanced Research =

Research center in New Mexico, U.S.

- Former names: School of American Archaeology, School of American Research
- Type: Private
- Founder: Alice Cunningham Fletcher
- President: Morris W. Foster
- Location: Santa Fe, New Mexico, U.S.
- Website: sarweb.org

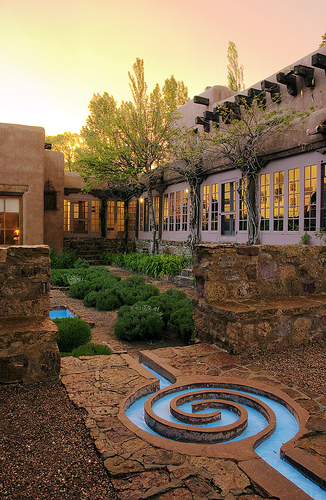
Spiral at the School for Advanced Research, May 2007

The School for Advanced Research (SAR), until 2007 known as the School of American Research and founded in 1907 as the School for American Archaeology (SAA), is an advanced research center located in Santa Fe, New Mexico, United States. Since 1967, the scope of the school's activities has embraced a global perspective through programs to encourage advanced scholarship in anthropology and related social science disciplines and the humanities, and to facilitate the work of Native American scholars and artists. SAR offers residential fellowships for artists and scholars, and it publishes academic and popular non-fiction books through SAR Press.

== Foundation ==
Edgar Lee Hewett, president of New Mexico Normal University in 1898

In the early years of the 20th century, archaeology was a young discipline with roots in historical studies of Old World antiquities. In 1906 Alice Cunningham Fletcher, an anthropologist and ethnographer of Plains Indian groups, was on the American Committee of the Archaeological Institute of America. The AIA, founded in Boston in 1879, had schools in Athens, Rome, and Palestine that sponsored research on classical civilization and promoted professional standards in archaeology. Fletcher wanted to establish an "Americanist" center to train students in the profession of archaeology, to engage in anthropological research in the Americas, and to preserve and study the unique cultural heritage of the American Southwest.

Her goals coincided with those of Edgar Lee Hewett, an educator and amateur archaeologist whom she met in Mexico in 1906. Nicknamed "El Toro" (the bull), Hewett was a controversial figure. He served as president of New Mexico Normal School in Las Vegas (now New Mexico Highlands University) from 1898 to 1903, where he taught some of the first anthropology courses to be offered at any U.S. college. His work lobbying for the protection of archaeological sites led to the creation of Mesa Verde National Park and the passage of the U.S. Antiquities Act of 1906.

In December 1907, the American Committee of the AIA accepted Fletcher's plan to establish the School of American Archaeology. It appointed Hewett as director and Fletcher as the first chairperson of the school's managing committee.

== Early years ==
Santa Fe, then the capital of New Mexico Territory, was chosen as the School of American Archaeology's headquarters in part because the territorial government offered the historic Palace of the Governors as a permanent home. In 1909, the legislature established the Museum of New Mexico as an agency of the school, creating a relationship that would continue for the next 50 years. Hewett became director of both the museum and the school. In 1917, the School of American Archaeology changed its name to the School of American Research to reflect a broader mission:

"to promote and carry on research in Archaeology and related branches of the Science of Man; to foster Art in all its branches through exhibitions and by other means which may from time to time be desirable". (Articles of Incorporation 1917)

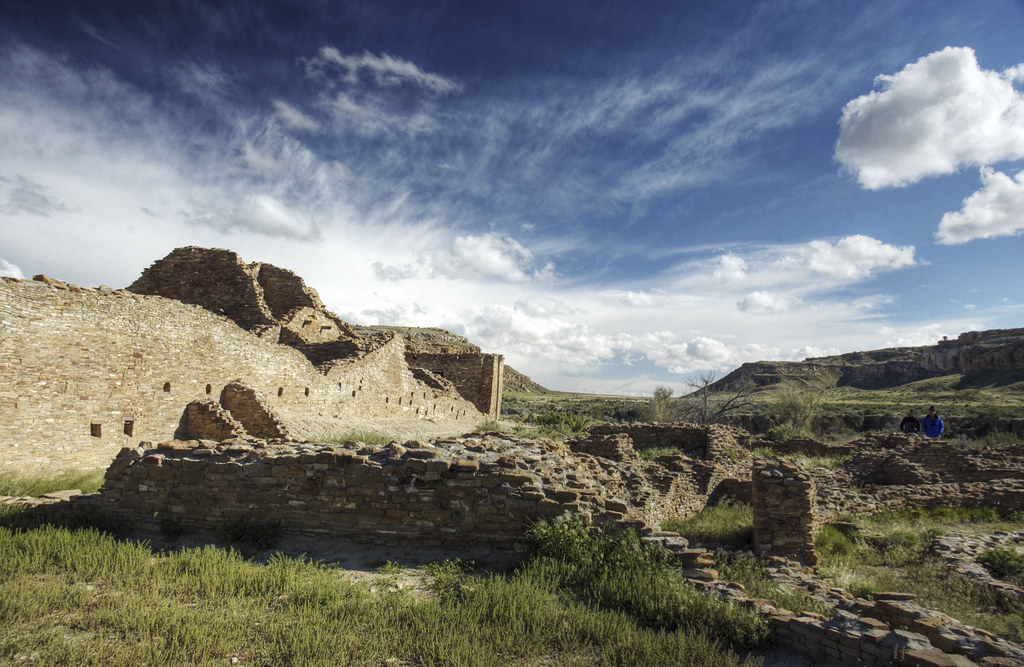
Pueblo del Arroyo, Chaco Canyon, New Mexico

Midway through its first year of operations, the school was immersed in excavating Pueblo ruins on the eastern edge of the Pajarito Plateau, west of Santa Fe, and conducting the first of its field programs. Many legendary archaeologists, among them Neil Judd, Alfred V. Kidder, and Sylvanus Morley, were trained at SAR field labs at Tyuonyi Ruin on El Rito de los Frijoles (now part of Bandelier National Monument), Chaco Canyon, Puye Cliff Dwellings, and other sites. The school also sponsored excavations in Mexico, Guatemala, and South America, and led the effort to preserve 22 Spanish missions in New Mexico. While directing the school, Hewett founded departments of anthropology at the University of Southern California and the University of New Mexico.

Through the Museum of New Mexico, the school took an early interest in promoting and preserving the artistic traditions of Southwestern Indians. Indian workers assisted at the School's excavations on the Pajarito Plateau, and their interactions with Hewett, Kenneth M. Chapman, and other archaeologists led to a recognition of individual talents and traditional aesthetics. Hewett and Chapman, an artist hired by Hewett to head the art department at New Mexico Normal School, and later one of the first employees of the School of American Archaeology, provided extensive support for Indian artists. They offered studio facilities, as well as collecting and exhibiting their work. Early Native artists promoted by SAR included Maria Martinez, Crescencio Martinez, Awa Tsireh, and Fred Kabotie, among many others. In 1922, the school sponsored the first Southwest Indian Fair, precursor of today's world-renowned Santa Fe Indian Market.

Hewett led the school and museum until his death in 1946 at age 82. A 20-year period of relative inactivity followed. The school continued to pursue archaeological research projects on a modest scale. It was headed, successively, by Sylvanus Morley, Boaz Long, Wayne L. Mauzy, Edward Weyer, Jr., and Eugene McCluney. This transition period ended in 1959, when the State Legislature formally separated the Museum of New Mexico from the school. The School of American Research was gutted, left with a staff of two and an uncertain future.

== A New Era ==
In 1967, Douglas W. Schwartz, a young professor of anthropology from the University of Kentucky, became the new director of the School of American Research. Schwartz broadened the school's focus to embrace advanced scholarship in anthropology and the humanities worldwide; and to promote the study, preservation, and creation of Southwest Indian art. Schwartz also continued the school's archaeological research with field excavations in the Grand Canyon in the late 1960s and, in the 1970s, the excavations of Arroyo Hondo Pueblo.

Over the years, SAR's offices had relocated from the Palace of the Governors to the Hewett House on Lincoln Street. In 1973, the school moved into an old adobe estate on Santa Fe's east side. El Delirio had been the home of Martha Root White and Amelia Elizabeth White. Built in the 1920s by William Penhallow Henderson, the estate was a popular gathering place for Santa Fe artists, writers, and intellectuals—among them Hewett, Morley, and others associated with the school. The White sisters were avid promoters of Indian art, and together they opened the first Native American art gallery in New York City. Elizabeth also was a founding member of the Indian Arts Fund (IAF) in Santa Fe and sat on SAR's Board of Managers for 25 years. When Elizabeth died in 1972 at age 94, she left El Delirio and other Santa Fe properties to the school. In that same year, the IAF disbanded and deeded its collections of Southwest Indian art to the school.

The new campus, with its many buildings, permitted the realization of Schwartz's vision for the school. The Advanced Seminar Program was inaugurated in 1968, and has since sponsored more than 120 seminars, the results of which are published by the school's SAR Press. The Resident Scholar Program, launched in 1972, has provided over 180 scholars with residential fellowships.

The construction of the Indian Arts Research Center in 1978 gave the collections inherited from the IAF a suitable home. In 1988, the J. I. Staley Prize was established to recognize books by living authors that exemplify outstanding research in anthropology. Over the succeeding two decades, several residential fellowships for Native artists were also established.

== New century, new directions ==
In 2001, SAR was under a new president, Richard M. Leventhal, an archaeologist from UCLA who assumed leadership of the school on the retirement of Dr. Schwartz. During his three-year tenure at the school, Dr. Leventhal worked to revitalize SAR's core programs and extend greater opportunities for scholars and visiting Native artists. Dr. Leventhal was succeeded in 2005 by Dr. James F. Brooks, formerly director of SAR Press. His term coincided with the school's centennial in 2007, when SAR changed its name from the School of American Research to the School for Advanced Research, to better reflect the global reach of its support for scholarship in the social sciences and humanities. Some of the highlights of Brooks's tenure include new initiatives such as the Campbell Program for Women Scholar Practitioners—which has supported women from Morocco, Ethiopia, and Kenya in developing strategies for women's economic and social empowerment—and an emphasis on collaborative research and exhibition projects with Native peoples; monthly Sparks Talks on local history and culture; and a field trip program serving more than two hundred participants annually, visiting locations as near as Pecos National Monument and as far as the borderlands of southeastern Turkey.

When Brooks resigned his post in June 2013, SAR's Board of Directors appointed Dr. David E. Stuart, an anthropologist and long-time teacher and senior administrator at the University of New Mexico, as interim president. In June 2014, Michael F. Brown assumed SAR's presidency after shifting to emeritus status at Williams College, on whose faculty he had long served. Brown, a cultural anthropologist familiar with SAR from participation in two advanced seminars and a term as resident scholar, has published extensively on new religious movements, the indigenous peoples of South America, and global efforts to protect indigenous cultural property from appropriation and misuse.

== Current programs ==
The School for Advanced Research offers residential fellowships for scholars and Native artists, and internships are provided for Native students pursuing academic careers or professional careers in museums. The school also sponsors scholarly seminars through its Advanced Seminar and Short Seminar programs. The results of many of these programs are published through SAR Press. The school recognizes outstanding books in anthropology with the annual J.I. Staley Prize. Public outreach includes membership, lecture, and tour and field trip programs. SAR has created an educational website for New Mexico grade-school students.
