= Museum of New Mexico =

Collection of New Mexican museums, historic sites, and archaeological services

The Museum of New Mexico is a collection of museums, historic sites, and archaeological services governed by the State of New Mexico. It currently consists of six divisions: the Palace of the Governors state history museum, the New Mexico Museum of Art, the Museum of Indian Arts and Culture, the Museum of International Folk Art, the archaeology division, and the state historic sites. Each division within the Museum of New Mexico adheres to policies decided by the Museum of New Mexico Board of Regents, a group of New Mexico residents appointed by the governor with consent of the Senate.

== History ==
The Museum of New Mexico was established on February 19, 1909, by the New Mexico Territorial legislature. This pre-statehood legislation mandated that the Museum of New Mexico be housed in the historic Palace of the Governors in Santa Fe. Over the years, the Museum of New Mexico added several other properties to include the New Mexico Museum of Art, Laboratory of Anthropology, Museum of International Folk Art and the historic sites of Coronado, Fort Selden, Bosque Redondo Memorial at Fort Sumner, Jémez, Lincoln, El Camino Real Historic Trail Site, the future Taylor Reynolds Barela Mesilla historic site and the Los Luceros.

An unusual arrangement existed with the privately funded School of American Archaeology in which the school was allowed to occupy the Palace of the Governors free of rent and the director of the school would serve as the director of the museum. This arrangement lasted until Governor John Burroughs signed a bill on April 2, 1959, forcing the School of American Research to leave state property and the Board of Regents. The Museum of New Mexico has been reorganized several times, most recently in 2004 when the Department of Cultural Affairs was created as a cabinet-level department.
