= Halfway House Outlier =

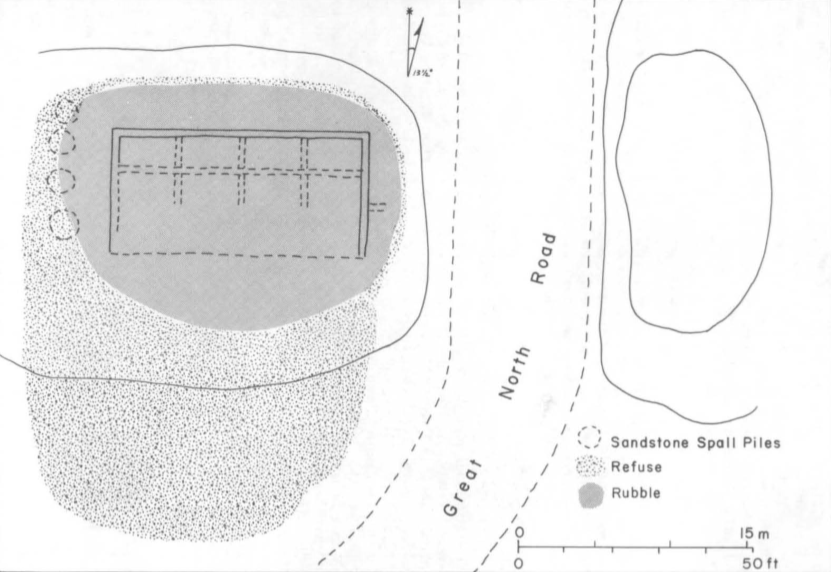
Site map of Halfway House Outlier, with Great North Road

Halfway House Outlier is a small, twelve-room, one-story Ancestral Puebloan great house and archeological site located in New Mexico, United States. It lies halfway between Chaco Canyon and Salmon Ruins, on the Great North Road. Halfway House appears to have been built in relation to the road, and was probably an orientation point used during the road's construction.

Coordinates: 36°23′20″N 107°56′27″W
