= Herradura (Ancestral Puebloans) =

Architectural feature

Herradura (Spanish: "horseshoe") are architectural features associated with the Ancestral Puebloan road network. They feature three-foot-tall curved masonry walls in the shape of a "D", "C", or horseshoe, with a diameter of 10 to 30 feet (3.0 to 9.1 m). Herraduras are found on hills and berms near Chacoan roads. Many of them are oriented so the opening faces east. They are thought to have indicated changes in road direction. They are not believed to have been residential, but the presence of broken pottery near them suggests they might have been roadside shrines.
