= Great North Road (Ancestral Puebloans) =

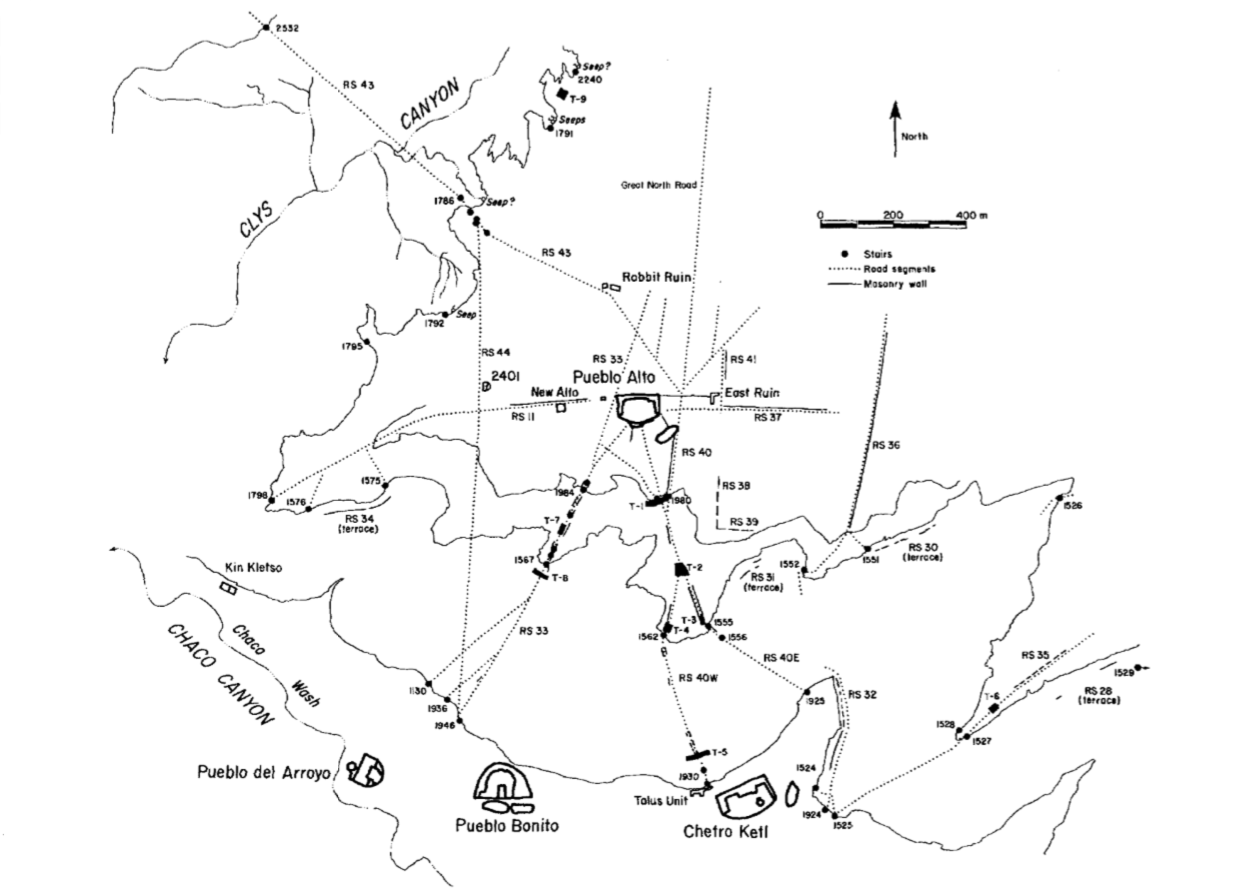
A map of the road network around the Pueblo Alto community

The Great North Road is an Ancestral Puebloan road that stretches from Pueblo Alto, in Chaco Canyon, New Mexico, to Kutz Canyon in the northern portion of the San Juan Basin. It is thought to follow Kutz Canyon to the San Juan River and Salmon Ruins. Several archeological sites along the road are thought to have been ancient way stations, including Halfway House Outlier, Pierre's Outlier, and Twin Angels Outlier. The Great North Road is one of the best studied Chacoan roads, and includes four parallel roads along some segments, as well as low masonry features thought to be curbs. Herraduras are often found along segments of the road system.
