= Old Town Albuquerque =

Historic townsite in New Mexico

Coordinates: 35°05′46″N 106°40′11.5″W

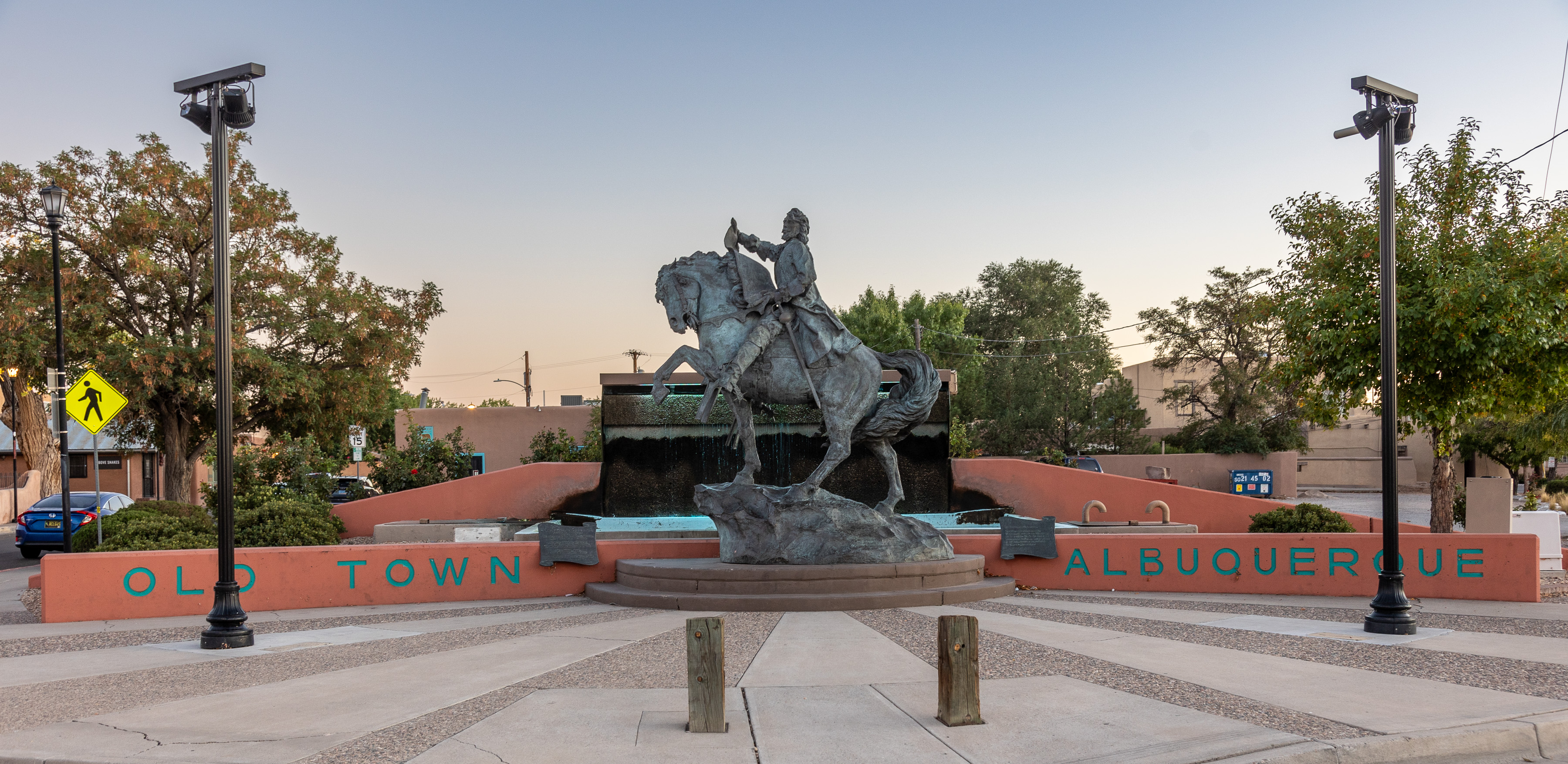
Equestrian statue of Francisco Cuervo y Valdés, the founder of Albuquerque, greets visitors at the entrance to Old Town

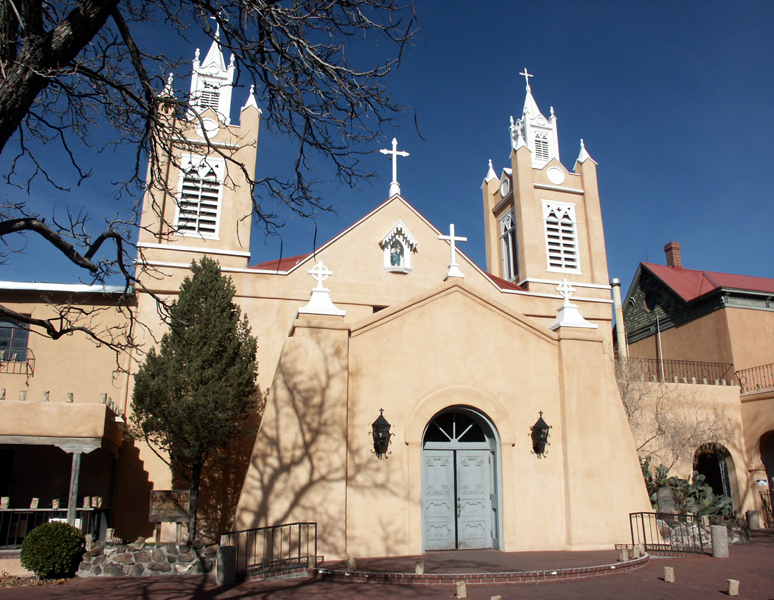
San Felipe de Neri Church was built during the 18th century

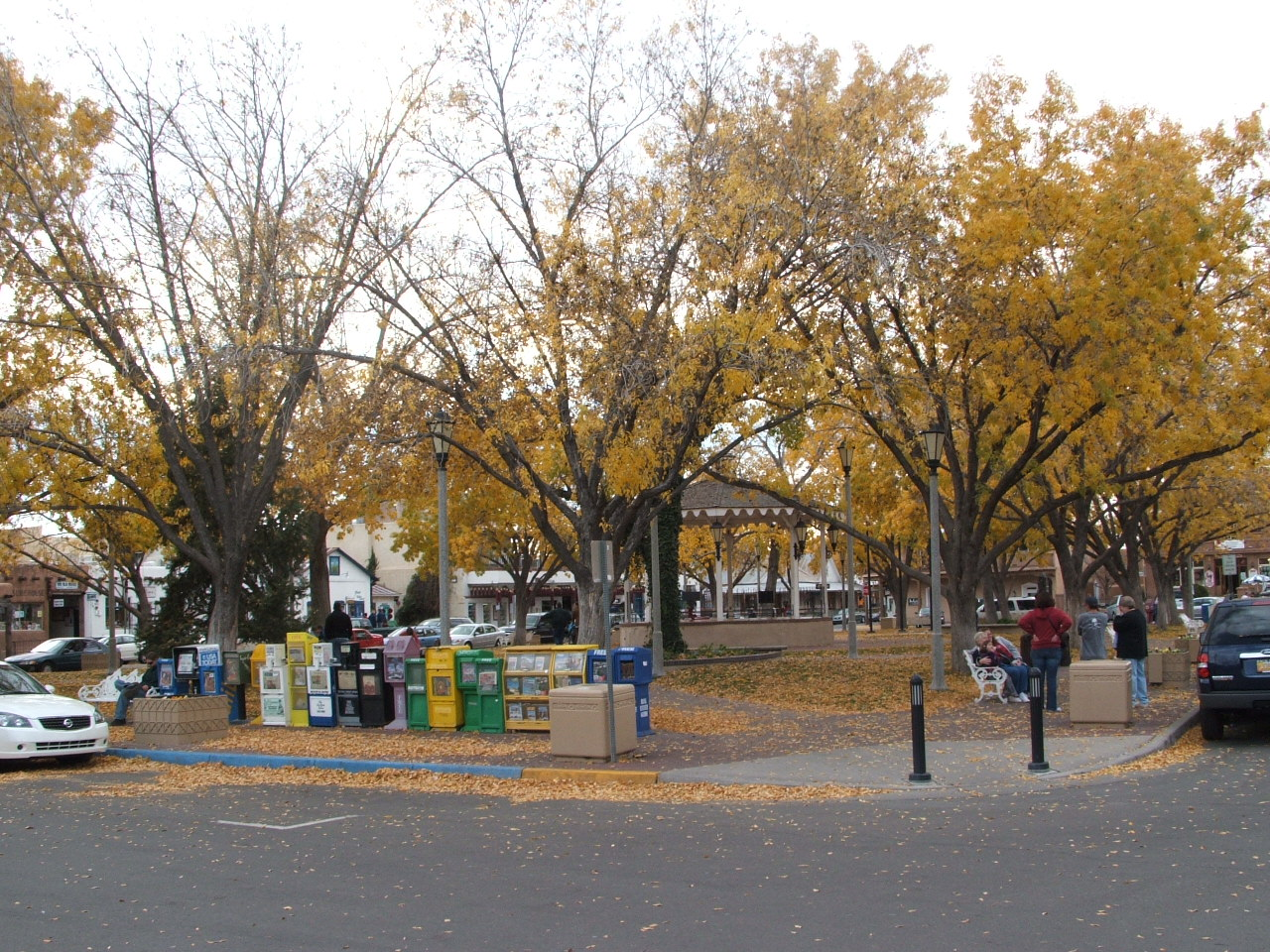
Old Town Plaza in the autumn of 2006

Old Town is the historic original town site of Albuquerque, New Mexico, for the provincial kingdom of Santa Fe de Nuevo México, established in 1706 by New Mexico governor Francisco Cuervo y Valdés. It is listed on the New Mexico State Register of Cultural Properties as the Old Albuquerque Historic District, and is protected by a special historic zoning designation by the city. However, prior to its establishment as a city in the Santa Fe de Nuevo México province, many indigenous tribes lived there including Diné, Pueblo, Apache, Tiwa, and others. The present-day district contains about ten blocks of historic adobe buildings surrounding Old Town Plaza. On the plaza's north side stands San Felipe de Neri Church, a Spanish colonial church constructed in 1793.

Old Town is a popular tourist destination with a large number of restaurants, shops, and galleries, and is also home to the Albuquerque Museum of Art and History. The New Mexico Museum of Natural History and Science and the Explora science center are located a short distance to the northeast. Old Town is known for its luminaria displays during the holiday season, particularly on Christmas Eve.

== Layout ==
Old Town occupies an area of about 0.8 square miles (2.1 km^{2}), roughly bounded by Rio Grande Boulevard, Mountain Road, 19th Street, and Central Avenue. At the center is Old Town Plaza, surrounded by approximately ten blocks of one- and two-story buildings. The central plaza layout was favored by Spanish colonial authorities and is found in many other cities and towns throughout New Mexico, including Santa Fe, Taos, Las Vegas, and Mesilla. The area around Old Town was originally acequia fed farmland, but it has been covered over by 20th century urban development, however, land to the north and south of the plaza continues to operate for agricultural purposes with the acequia traditions, including Los Ranchos, Corrales, South Valley, and Isleta Village Proper.

== History ==
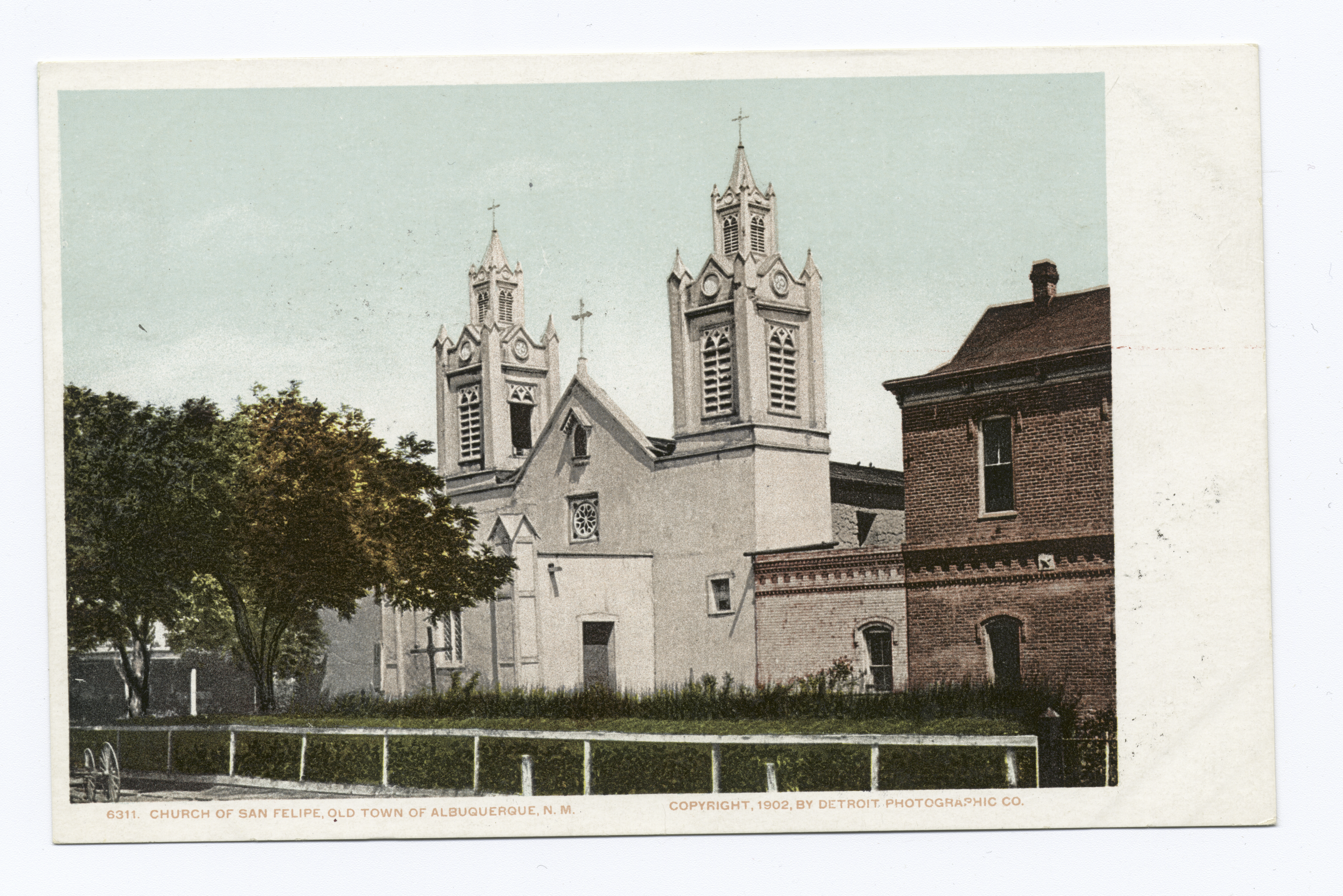
San Felipe de Neri Church as depicted on a postcard from 1898

Prior to 1706, indigenous tribes traveled through and inhabited the land on which Old Town Albuquerque now stands. These indigenous peoples include the Anasazi, Diné, Pueblo, Apache, and Tiwa communities. While it is unknown approximately how long the area has been inhabited by indigenous peoples, their long-standing presence in the Albuquerque area is exemplified by the thousands of years old Petroglyphs found in the Sandia mountains to the Acoma pueblo which is still inhabited by the Acoma tribe today. During this time, the region that is now known as Albuquerque was known as Paak'u. The indigenous peoples residing in the Paak'u region engaged in subsistence farming and hunting, managing complex, intertwined systems of government and religion. The Pueblo peoples of modern Albuquerque originally stemmed from one tribe called the Tamayame or Santa Ana tribe. As they discovered the resources that the Sandia mountains and the Rio Grande had to offer, they slowly spread into different pueblos as far as Angostura, a village 131 miles northeast of Albuquerque. The spread led into the development of five distinct language groups and many more dialects based on those languages. Today, because of the combination of smaller and larger pueblos due to colonization by both the Spanish and Anglo Americans, there is a total of nineteen pueblos which are recognized as sovereign nations in and around Albuquerque.

=== Spanish rule ===
When the Spanish colonists arrived, their relation with the existing indigenous peoples in the Albuquerque area were complex and violent. In New Mexico, the first interaction that Puebloans had was at the Zuni pueblo of Vacapa when the Spanish explorer Frey Marcos de Niza sent his black African slave Estaban to interact with the Zuni people. Estaban was subsequently killed by the Zuni, establishing a tone for Spanish-Indigenous relations throughout New Mexico which carried on into the founding of Albuquerque. The Spanish first had contact with the Pueblos in the area that would become Old Town Albuquerque when in 1540 Francisco Vázquez de Coronado’s expedition searching for the Seven Cities of Cibola lead him to the Pueblos. Coronado was able to peacefully trade small gifts and items with them at first, but as winter overtook the unprepared conquistadors, they steadily became more and more violent with the Pueblo peoples, demanding more food and supplies and progressively conquering a few of the Puebloan’s smaller villages. The Tiwa people of Albuquerque fought back against the Spanish until they left to return to Mexico in the Spring of 1541. However, the violent interactions between the two parties gave each a long-lasting impression of the other, further contributing to negative relations between the Spanish and Indigenous peoples of Albuquerque. This paved the way for the violent conquest of Juan de Oñate, and his ouster from New Mexico by the indigenous Pueblo people during the Pueblo Revolt of 1680.

In 1693, Albuquerque began to be resettled by a group of people traveling in the Spanish “Reconquista” led by Don Diego de Vargas. Several families in this group split off and asked permission to settle the Middle Valley which was the area south of the Sandia and Alameda pueblos. The settlement grew progressively to encompass around forty-five Spanish estate and what is known as Old Town Albuquerque was established in 1702 and recognized by Francisco Cuervo y Valdes, the governor of Spanish New Mexico, as a municipality in 1706. In 1784, over 3500 Spaniards and 600 Indigenous people were recognized by the census to be residents of Old Town. However, for many of the Indigenous tribes living around Old Town, the rapid growth of Old Town served as a reminder to the continuing conquest of their people. Cuervo reported that the new settlement was home to 252 residents and had been laid out with streets, a plaza, and a church in accordance with the town planning regulations set forth in the Laws of the Indies. Cuervo's account had been exaggerated in order to offer a centralized Villa to better serve the already existent Hispano and Pueblo communities. Those communities included Barelas, Corrales, Isleta Pueblo, Los Ranchos, Sandia Pueblo, and others along the Rio Grande rather than a centralized settlement. After a formal investigation, the villa was allowed to keep its title, especially as it was established to serve those communities as an outpost on Camino Real de Tierra Adentro.

Women also played an overlooked role in Old Town Albuquerque. At least twenty women are known to have been a part of the Spanish colonization of Albuquerque and the subsequent founding of Old Town. While many were subjugated to more traditional colonial roles like cooking, cleaning, and homemaking, some quickly became heads of their respective families due to the death of their husbands. Those who were designated heads of households were able to inherit land as a result of Spanish law and became the breadwinners for their families. The twenty women who are known to have helped colonize Old Town have come to be acknowledged as the "founding women of Albuquerque" and are listed on a plaque in Old Town Plaza provided by the New Mexico Historic Women Marker Program.

Like other Spanish colonial settlements, Albuquerque consisted of a central plaza surrounded by houses, government offices, and a church. For much of the 18th century, the homes around the plaza were inhabited only on Sundays as the residents spent the rest of the week on their farms. It was not until the late 1700s that a permanent population was established at the plaza.

=== Mexican and American rule ===
With the Possession of Albuquerque, along with the rest of New Mexico, passed to Mexico in 1821 following the Mexican War of Independence and later to the United States of America in 1846, during the Mexican American war (1846-1848), when General Stephen W. Kearny took control of Santa Fe and the Santa Fe trail in 1846. The territory was officially recognized as US territory on February 2, 1848 under the signature of the Treaty of Guadalupe Hidalgo, representing yet another change in the power dynamic for Indigenous people and Hispanics (Mexican) living in New Mexico alike. Kearny's troops established a U.S. Army post near the plaza, which brought an influx of goods and people over the next twenty years. The 1860 Census showed a population of 1,608, of which the army garrison made up about a third. During the U.S. Civil War, Confederate troops under Henry Hopkins Sibley captured the town in March 1862 but were later forced to retreat back to Texas after losing most of their supplies at the Battle of Glorieta Pass. Albuquerque saw minor action when the retreating Confederates were involved in a skirmish with Union troops in the Battle of Albuquerque. For the most part, however, the town remained a quiet agricultural community.

The Atchison, Topeka, and Santa Fe Railway reached Albuquerque in 1880, building a depot about 2 miles (3.2 km) east of the plaza. This led to the creation of a rival "New Albuquerque" (now Downtown Albuquerque) which quickly boomed thanks to the railroad and was incorporated as the City of Albuquerque in 1891. The original town, now called Old Albuquerque, entered a decline as businesses and institutions moved to New Town. The county courthouse was moved in 1926, and by the 1930s barely any businesses were still operating around the plaza. Old Town's fortunes began to improve in the 1940s as Albuquerque citizens began to take note of Old Town's historic value, and the Old Albuquerque Historical Society was established in 1946. Old Town was annexed by the city in 1949, bringing municipal improvements like paved streets and sidewalks for the first time. Since then, Old Town has developed into a popular tourist attraction, with most of the adobe houses re-purposed into shops, restaurants, and galleries.

== The Plaza ==
Old Town Plaza dates to the original founding of the city in the early 1700s and remains the center of Old Town. It was originally larger than today, extending to the south and east, but was reduced to its present size by the late 1800s. In the 1850s, a 121-foot (37 m) flagpole was erected in the center of the plaza by the U.S. Army. The adobe wall surrounding the plaza was replaced with a picket fence in 1881 and then a stone wall built by the Works Progress Administration in 1937. The WPA's walls and bandstand were unpopular and were removed just eleven years later through a grassroots effort organized by the Old Albuquerque Historical Society. The historical society also oversaw construction of a new bandstand, new landscaping, and installation of 16 wrought iron benches purchased from Chihuahua, Mexico.

At the east end of the plaza is a display of two replica M1835 mountain howitzers. During the civil war, the guns originally belonged to the Union until the Confederacy captured the guns and used them against the Union. Retreating Confederate forces buried eight howitzers near the plaza in 1862 to prevent them from falling into Union hands. The guns were rediscovered in 1889 with the help of the former Confederate artillery commander, who still remembered their location. Two of the howitzers were put on display in the plaza but were later moved to the Albuquerque Museum of Art and History and replaced with replicas. Accompanying the guns is a plaque that is controversial for having pro-confederate sentiments, mentioning the name of a Confederate Major Trevanion Teel. The plaque was partially funded by his ancestors, however, Teel was a member of the Knights of the Golden Circle, a group like the Ku Klux Klan, that sought to conquer territory in Latin America with the purpose of establishing an empire based on slavery. At the west end of the plaza is a display of various flags which have flown over the city, including those of Spain, Mexico, and the United States. There was also a Confederate flag reflecting the brief occupation of the city by Confederate forces, but it was removed in 2015 amid the ongoing controversy surrounding such symbols. Two other plaques, both which have created controversy due to their historical flaws in the portrayal of events, that commemorated the Skirmish of Albuquerque and buried Confederate soldiers respectively were also removed at that time. At this time, the plaque that accompanies the howitzers remains intact.

=== La Jornada Statue ===
A controversial statue known as La Jornada featuring the Spanish conquistador Juan de Oñate formerly sat in the middle of Old Town Plaza. The statue was commissioned by the City of Albuquerque in 1998 and created by New Mexico artists Betty Sabo and Reynaldo "Sunny" Rivera. It depicts several Spanish settlers and an Indigenous guide led by Oñate who is one of the first Spanish conquistadors to travel to and settle in the New Mexico territory. However, much of Oñate's success were at the expense of Indigenous peoples, most notably the Acoma people, who he tortured and massacred. Oñate was later removed and prosecuted by the Spanish crown in 1614, however, the pain and generational trauma he has inflicted on many Indigenous peoples in New Mexico have caused continuing controversy around the statue. In the wake of the George Floyd murder, during a protest that rose at the site of the statue, a gunman opened fire on the protesters, prompting the Albuquerque mayor Tim Keller have the statue removed the next day. The incident occurred when armed counter protesters from the New Mexico Civil Guard, a paramilitary group, attempted to act in a law enforcement capacity, trying to detain protestors. A judge later ruled that the group did not have the right to act in the capacity as law enforcement or national guard as well as barring them from having any law enforcement powers independent of the state government of New Mexico. As of 2024, the statue was on view in the East Garden of the Albuquerque Museum of Art and History.

== Buildings ==
Most of the historic buildings in Old Town were built between 1870 and 1900, though some are older. Only one building, San Felipe de Neri Church, is proven to date to the Spanish colonial period. During the 20th century, many of the buildings were remodeled to facilitate modern commercial use, often including historically insensitive conversion of authentic vernacular and Victorian architectural details to a more idealized Territorial or Pueblo Revival style. Other buildings have been better preserved.

Five properties in Old Town are listed on the National Register of Historic Places:

- Salvador Armijo House, built c. 1840
- Charles A. Bottger House, built in 1912
- Our Lady of the Angels School, built in 1878
- San Felipe de Neri Church, built in 1793
- Antonio Vigil House, built in 1879
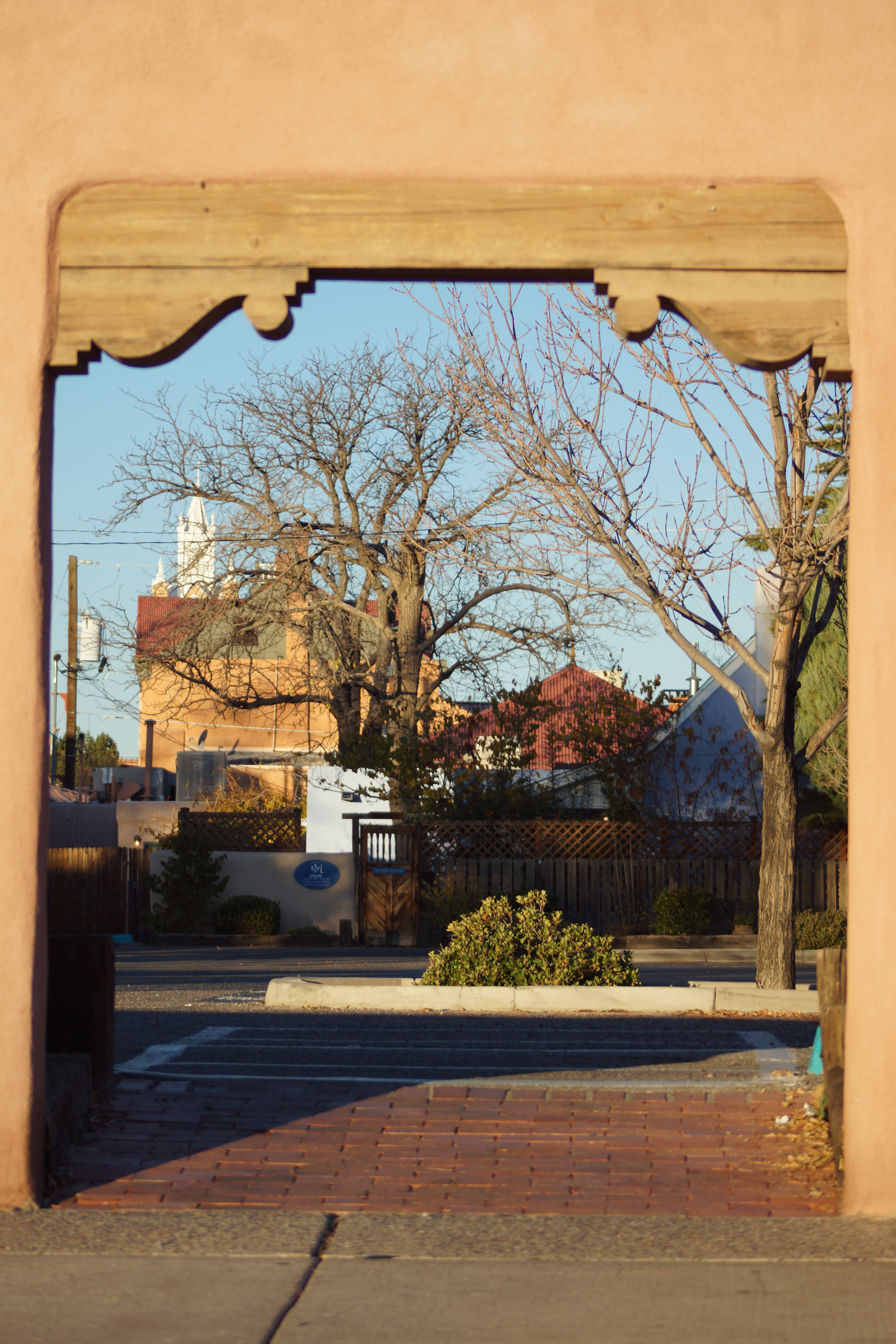
Gateway to Old Town Albuquerque, 2013

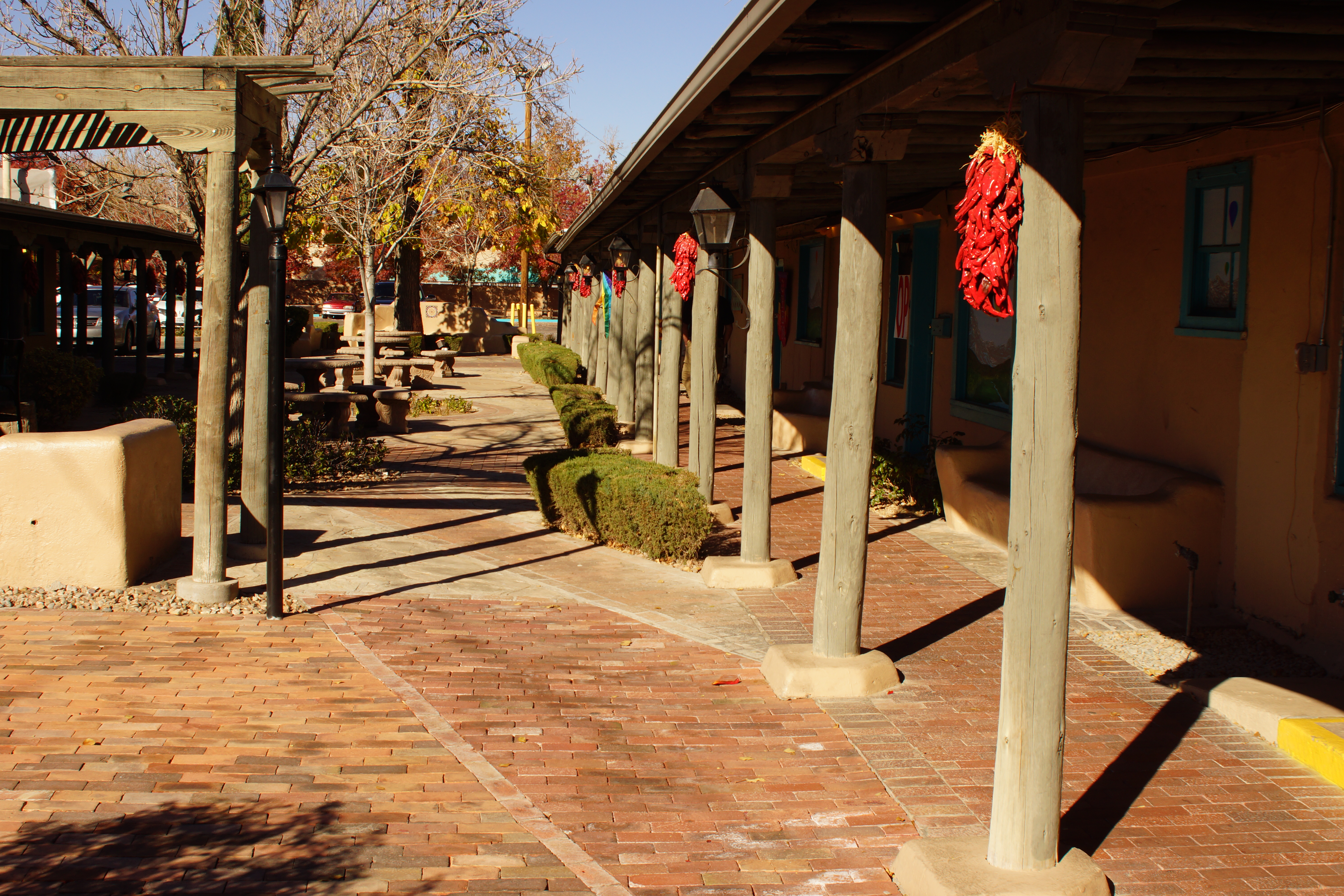
Typical walk in Old Town Albuquerque, 2013

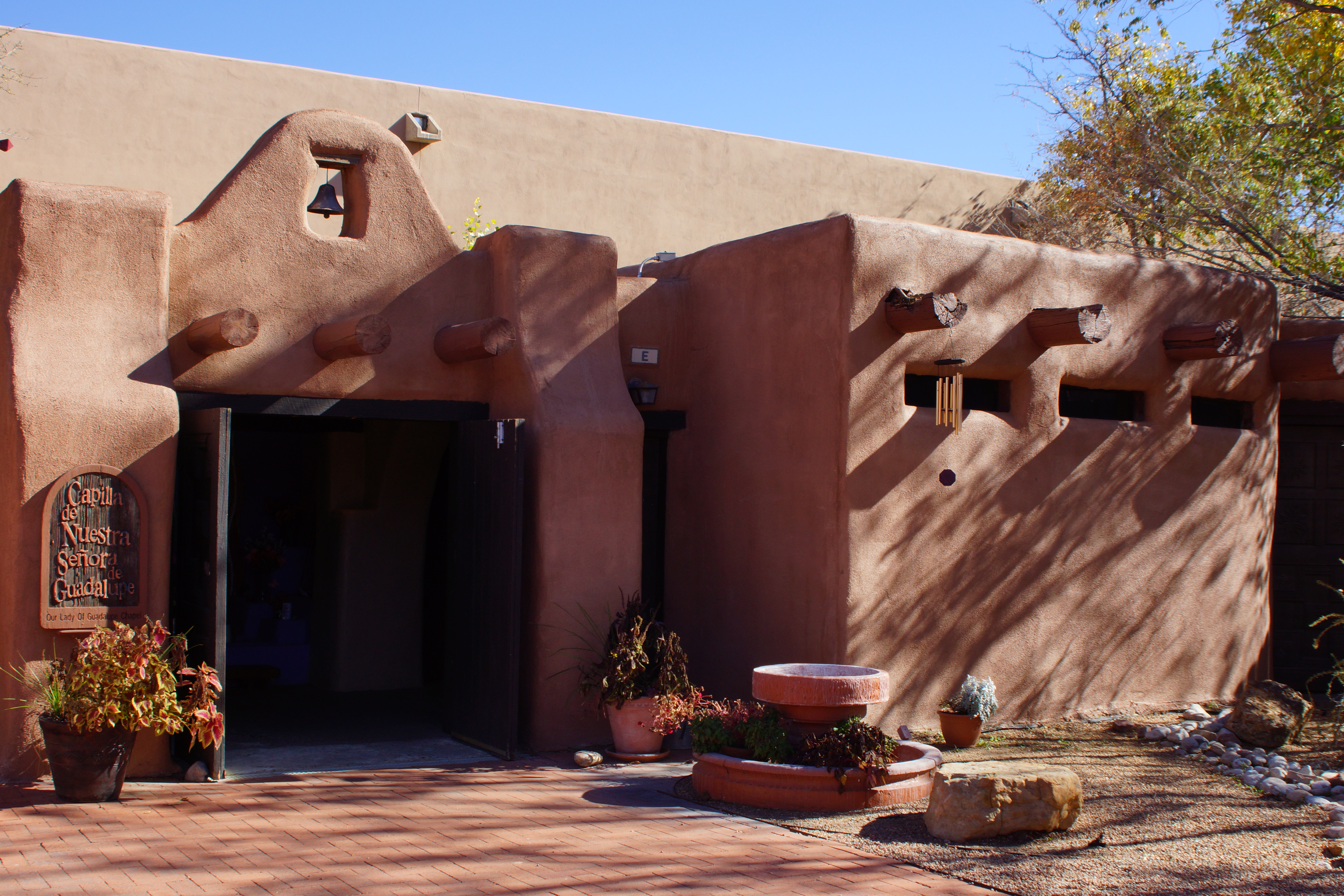
Guadalupe Chapel, 2013

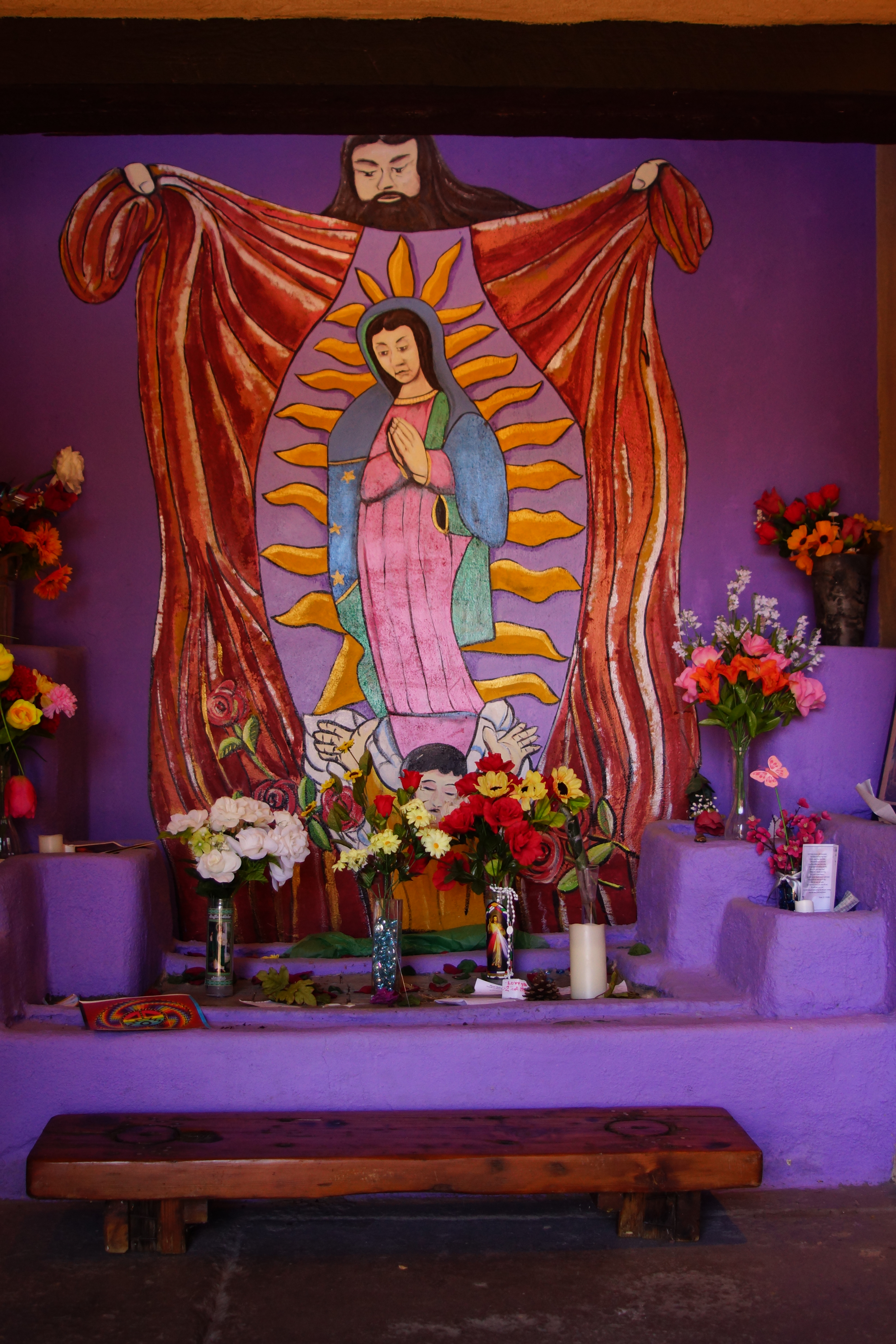
Altar in Guadalupe Chapel, 2013

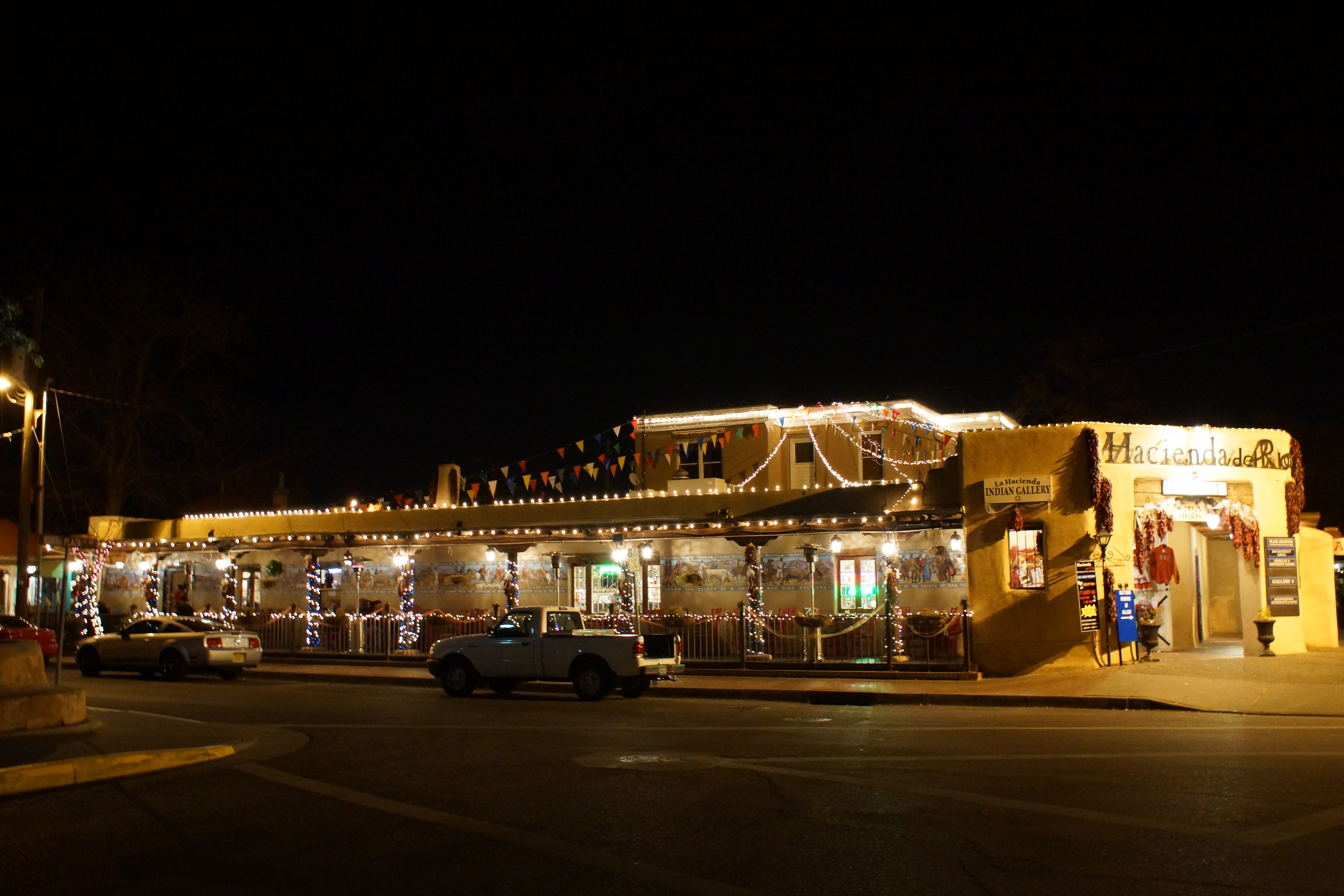
Restaurant in Old Town Albuquerque, 2013
