= Explora (Albuquerque, New Mexico) =

Scientific museum in Albuquerque, New Mexico, United States of America

Coordinates: 35.097294°N 106.664409°W

- Established: 2003
- Location: Albuquerque, New Mexico, United States
- Type: Science museum and children's museum
- Director: Joe Hastings
- Website: www.explora.us

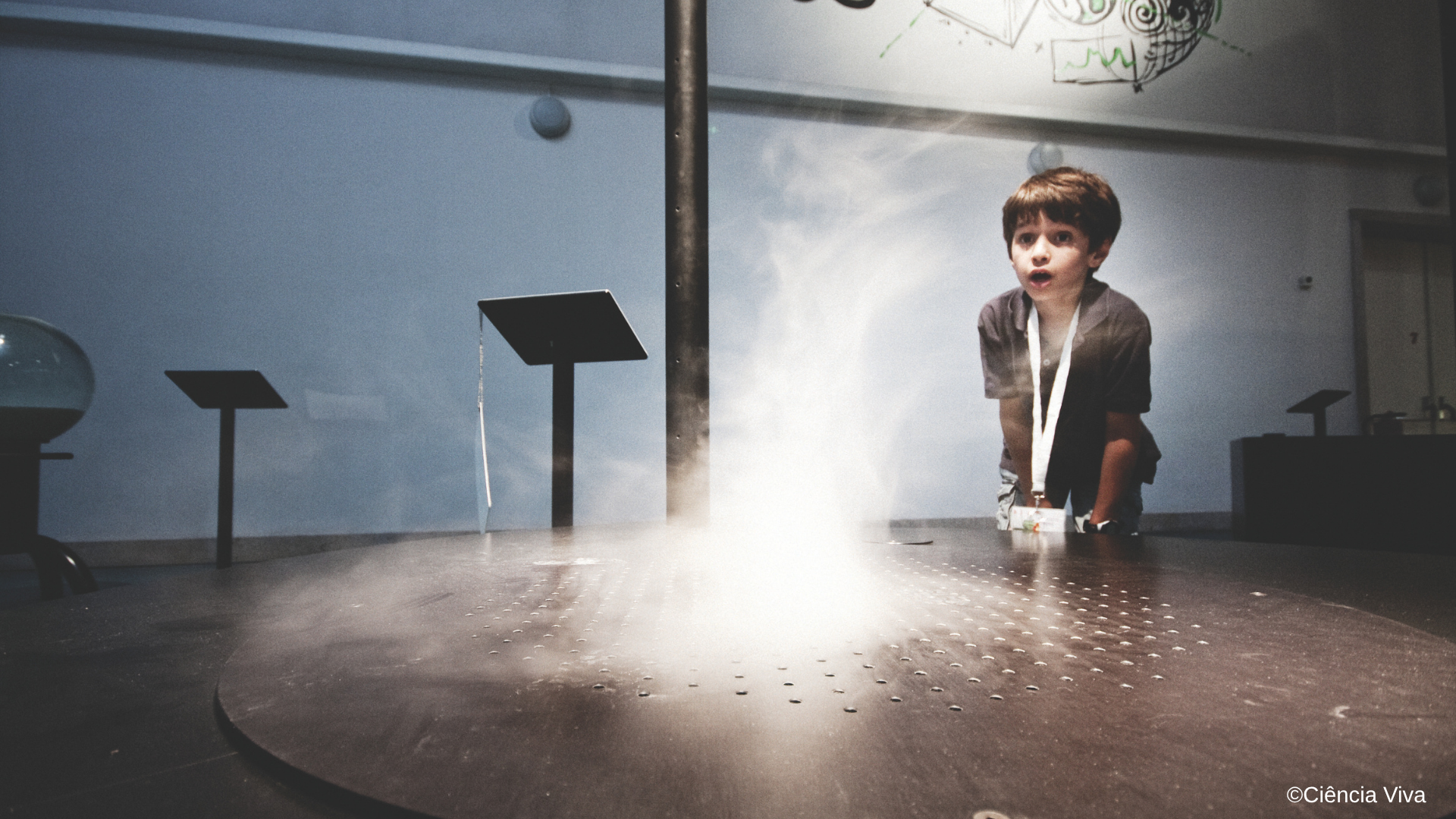

Explora is a science center in Albuquerque, New Mexico, United States, located near Old Town Albuquerque. Its name is the imperative form of the Spanish language verb explorar, which means to explore.

The museum employs a hands-on, inquiry-based learning approach to science, math and art. The museum has 20,000 square feet (1,900 m^{2}) of exhibit space on two floors, which contain over 250 interactive exhibits that cover a broad range of science, technology and art. Notable exhibits include a laminar flow fountain, an experiment bar, an arts and crafts area, and a high-wire bike. In addition to the exhibits, the building houses a performance theater, gift store, educational program areas, the in-house exhibit workshop and staff offices.

Explora is a member of the Association of Science-Technology Centers (ASTC). Explora, along with the New Mexico Museum of Natural History and Science and the National Museum of Nuclear Science & History, hosted the ASTC 2013 Conference in Albuquerque.

== Mission statement ==
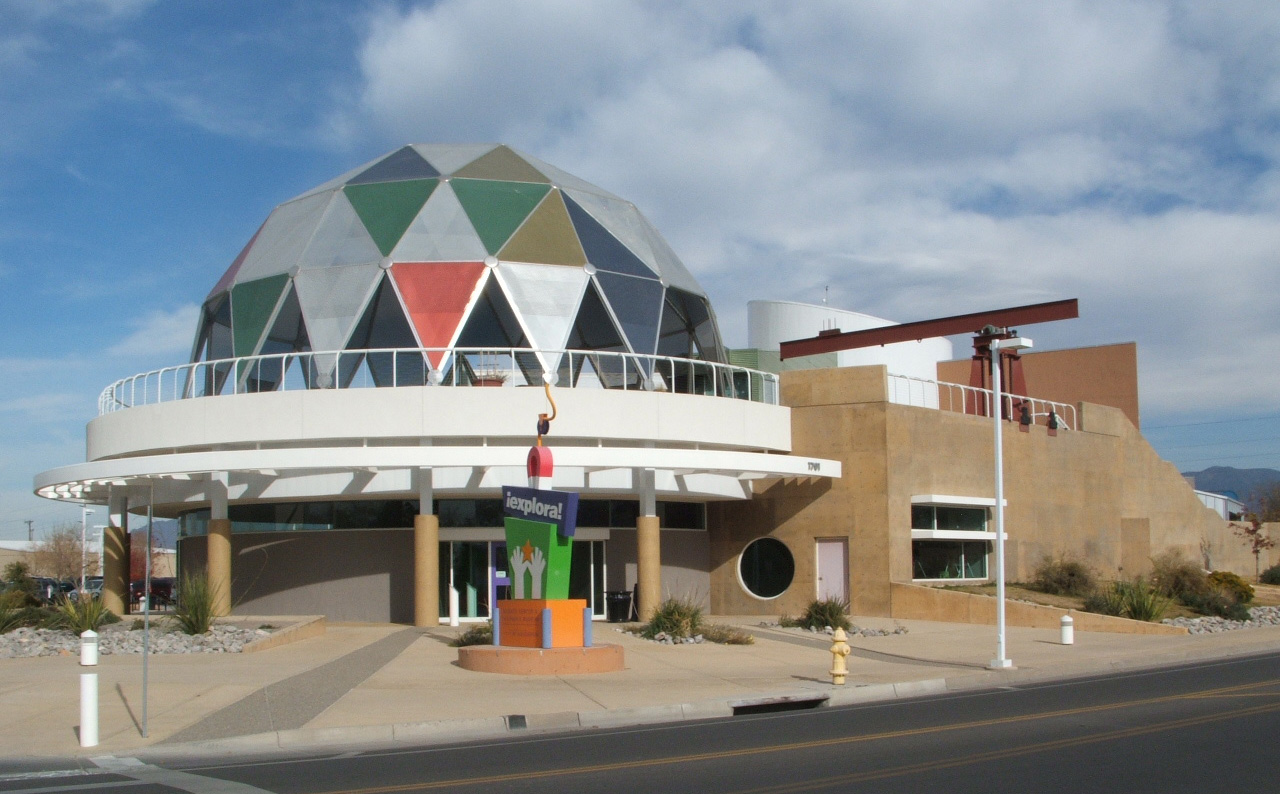
The Explora Center with its colorful dome

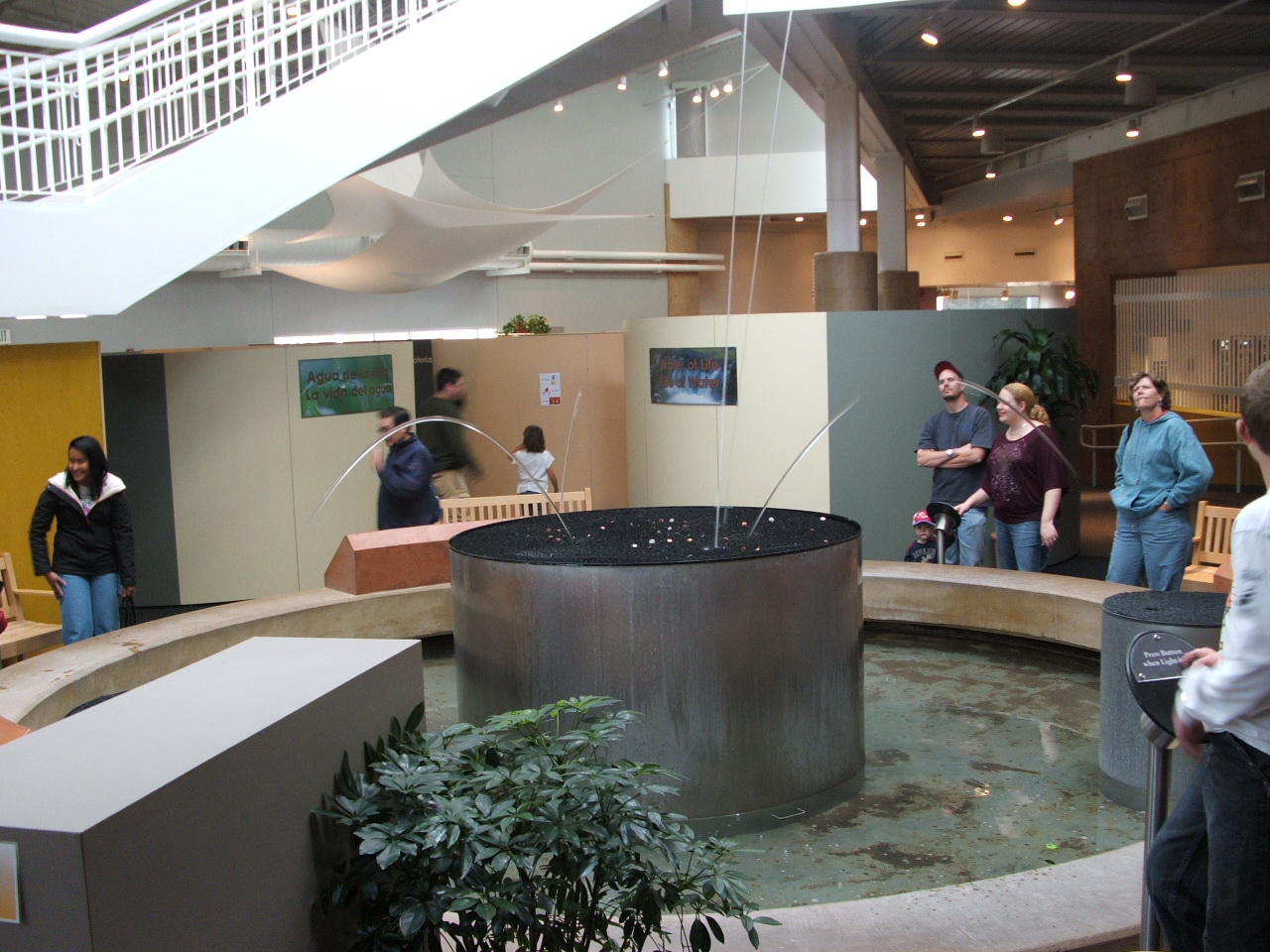
The laminar flow fountain and some of the exhibits

"Creating opportunities for inspirational discovery and the joy of lifelong learning through interactive experiences in science, technology and art."

== History ==
The New Mexico Kids! magazine wrote that Explora started "around 1983 with two individual groups who – with no knowledge of each other’s existence – had similar ideas: the first group envisioned a 'children’s Exploratorium,' while the second had the idea of a 'science and technology Exploratorium.'"

Explora incorporated in 1984, while the second group under the wing of the New Mexico Academy of Science, opened an exhibit called Explore in the Albuquerque Museum of Art and History.

New Mexico Kids! says:

In 1986, Explora and the New Mexico Academy of Sciences were joined by HealthQuest, an organization interested in health education that wanted a “health and medicine Exploratorium.” The three formed a consortium, and worked with the City of Albuquerque to develop a quality of life tax project that would provide a permanent facility.

The tax was approved in 1987, and construction plans were drawn up by Mahlman Studio Architecture.

Explora Science Center opened in Downtown Albuquerque’s First Plaza Galleria in 1993. The museum moved to the Sheraton Old Town, and then to Winrock Center. In 1995, Explora merged with the Albuquerque Children’s Museum and became Explora Science Center and Children’s Museum. Explora opened its current location in December 2003.

Financial support comes from several sources, including earned income, public dollars from the city and the state, and corporation and foundation grants.

== Awards ==
=== Best of Burque ===
The Alibi named Explora Best Recreational Program for Kids. The magazine called Explora "an awesomely fun hands-on science center that gets kids (and grown-ups, especially on adult nights) excited about things like electricity, refracted light and systems in motion."

=== Shafer Leading Edge Award ===
In conjunction with the Pacific Science Center, Explora received the 2010 Shafer Leading Edge Award for Visitor Experiences from ASTC. The award recognized the National Science Foundation-funded program, Portal to the Public (PoP). ASTC describes PoP as bringing "local scientists onto the science center floor" to communicate "their research through conversations and specialized activities".

=== IMLS Medal ===
In November 2010, Explora was named a recipient of the National Medal for Museum and Library Service by the Institute of Museum and Library Services (IMLS). The medal recognizes museums and libraries that excel in community involvement. Explora's Executive Director, Patrick Lopez, received the award in a ceremony at the White House on December 17, 2010.
