= San Felipe de Neri Church =

Historic church in New Mexico, United States

- U.S. National Register of Historic Places
- NM State Register of Cultural Properties
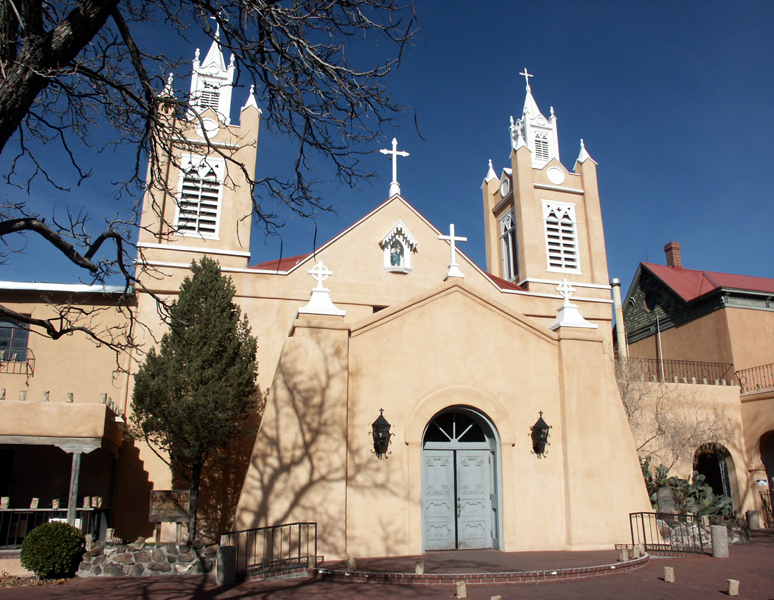
- San Felipe de Neri Church
- Location: 2005 North Plaza St. NW; Albuquerque, New Mexico
- Nearest city: Albuquerque
- Coordinates: 35°5′48″N 106°40′11″W
- Built: 1793–1860s (the interior was completed in 1916)
- NRHP reference No.: 69000140
- NMSRCP No.: 39

Significant dates
- Added to NRHP: October 1, 1969
- Designated NMSRCP: February 21, 1969

San Felipe de Neri Church (Spanish: Iglesia de San Felipe de Neri) is a historic Catholic church located on the north side of Old Town Plaza in Albuquerque, New Mexico. Built in 1793, it is one of the oldest surviving buildings in the city and the only building in Old Town proven to date to the Spanish colonial period. The church is listed on the New Mexico State Register of Cultural Properties and the National Register of Historic Places and has remained in continuous use for over 200 years.

San Felipe de Neri replaced an older church, dating to the founding of Albuquerque in 1706, which collapsed in the winter of 1792–3. From its founding until 1817, church was run by Franciscan missionaries. During the Victorian era, under the influence of Bishop Jean-Baptiste Lamy, the church was remodeled with Gothic Revival elements, including bell towers, a new pitched roof, and interior decorations, to give it a more European appearance. This combination of elements from different periods and traditions makes the church notable architecturally as well as historically.

== History ==
=== First church ===
The church was established in 1706 under the direction of Fray Manuel Moreno, a Franciscan missionary who was among the original settlers of Albuquerque. The first baptism was recorded on June 26 of that year, though the church building may not have been completed until later. Its exact location is uncertain, but it is thought to have been on a different site than the current building, possibly on the west side of the plaza. The church was originally dedicated to St. Francis Xavier, but the Viceroy ordered the patron saint changed to St. Philip Neri in July 1706 to honor King Philip V.

In 1776 the church was inspected by Fray Atanasio Domínguez, who wrote that it faced east with an attached convent on the south side and was surrounded by a walled cemetery. Domínguez also encountered some confusion as to the church's patron saint, which the local people evidently still believed to be Francis Xavier. Domínguez had a painting of the correct saint installed and the church has been known as San Felipe de Neri since. The church was apparently allowed to deteriorate in the late 1700s to the point where it collapsed during the winter of 1792–93.

=== Second church ===
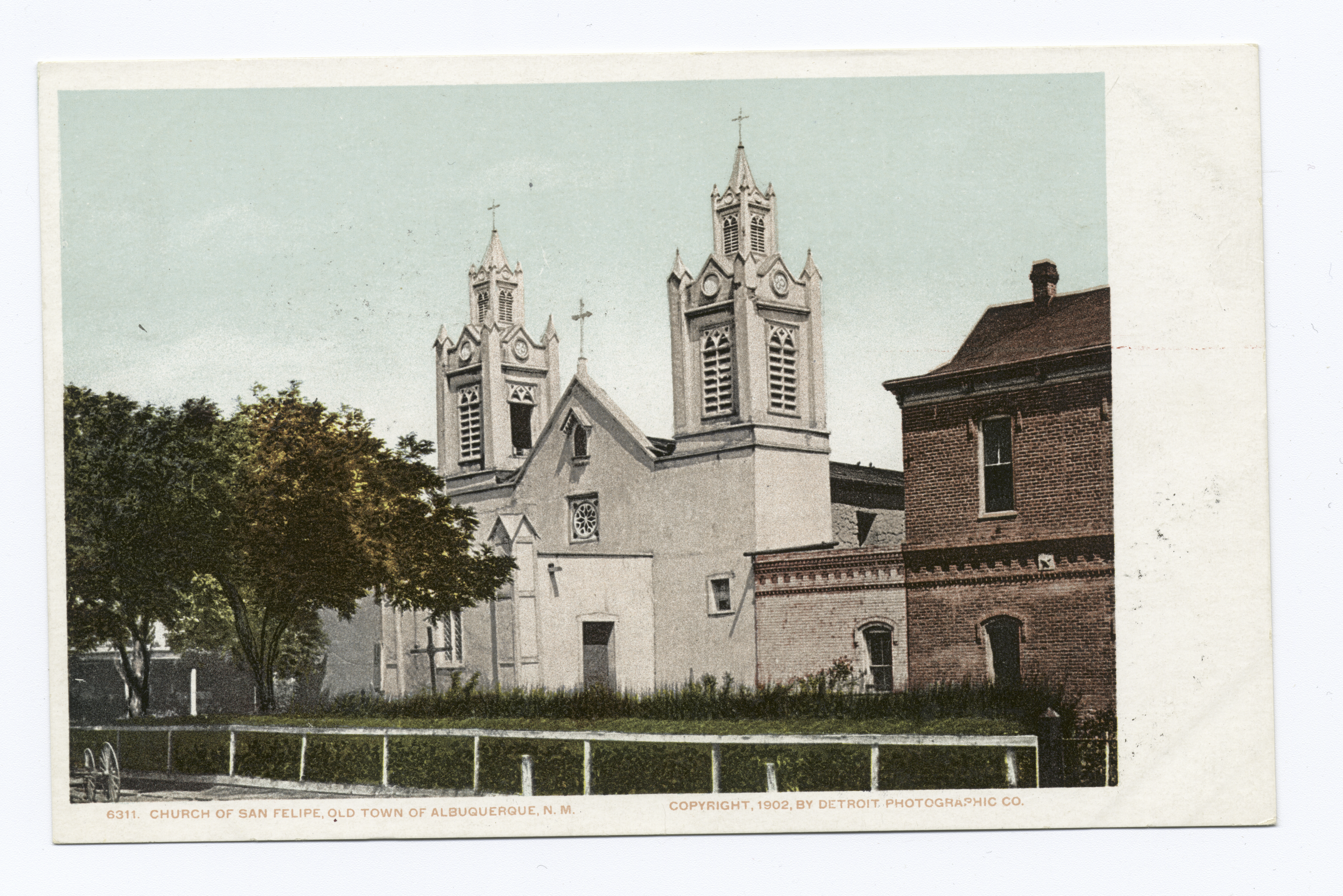
San Felipe de Neri Church as depicted on a postcard from 1902

The governor, Fernando de la Concha, called the church collapse a disgrace and ordered everyone in the surrounding area to help in constructing a replacement as soon as possible. The new church was begun in 1793 and had a more sophisticated design than the old building, with a cruciform rather than rectangular plan and twin bell towers. A convento was added on the east side for the Franciscan friars who operated the parish. In 1817, the administration of San Felipe de Neri was transferred to the Diocese of Durango, as the Franciscans had outlived their intended missionary role and were draining the province's funds by continuing to draw a sizable government subsidy. In fact, provincial authorities had been trying to remove them since 1767.

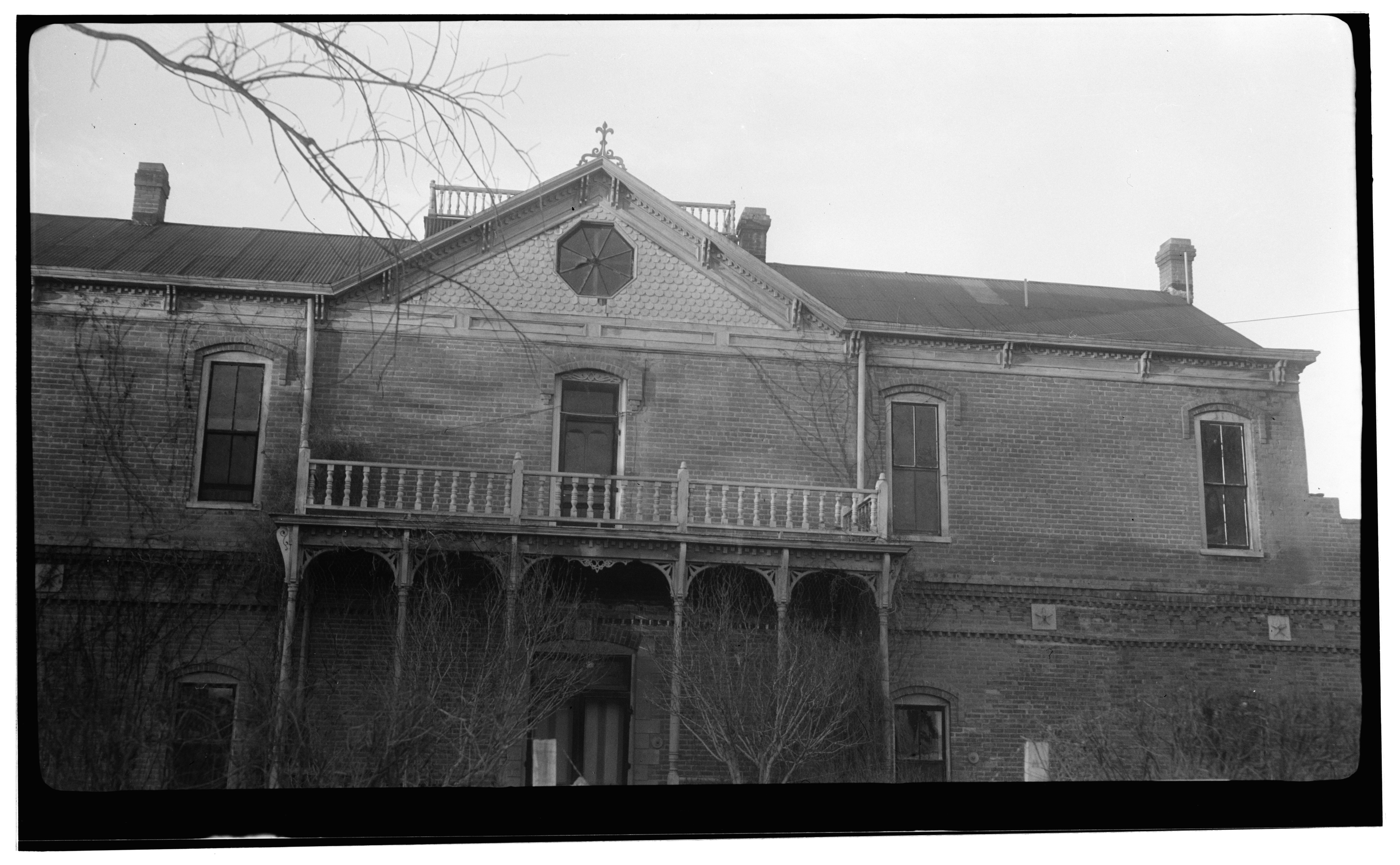
The rectory in 1940

Under the influence of Bishop (later Archbishop) Jean-Baptiste Lamy during the 1850s and 60s, the church was remodeled to give it a more Anglo appearance, with a pitched roof, vernacular Gothic Revival spires, and a new altar and pulpit painted to look like marble. In 1867, Lamy handed control of the parish to Italian Jesuits, who oversaw the construction of Our Lady of the Angels School in 1878 and a convent for the Sisters of Charity (who ran the school) in 1881. In 1890, the rectory was rebuilt with a second story, a new portico, and a widow's walk. The church interior was remodeled again in 1916, giving it a new floor and a pressed tin ceiling. In 1965, administration of the church was returned to the Archdiocese of Santa Fe. It remains a functioning parish church.

== Architecture ==
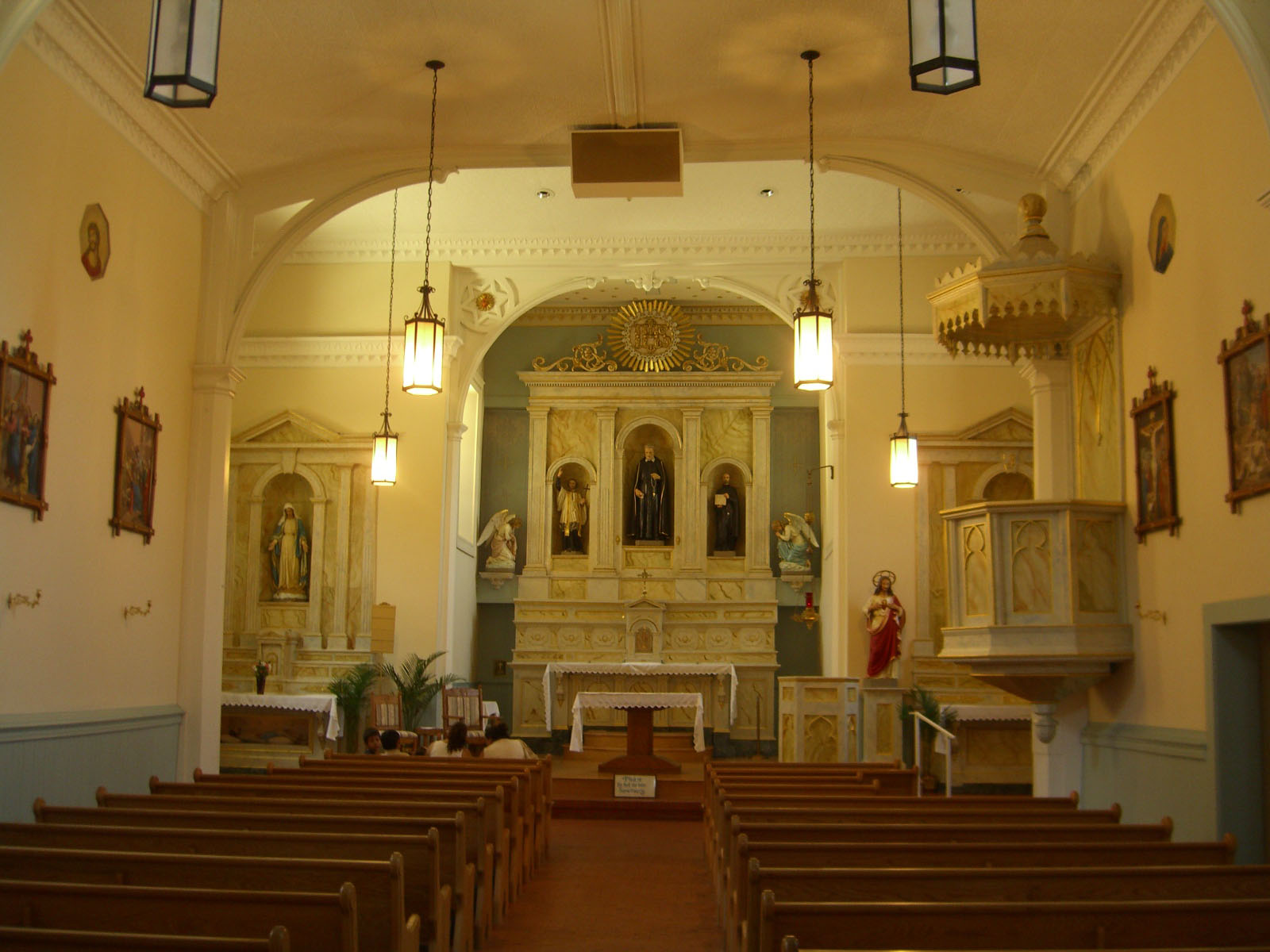
The church interior in 2008

San Felipe de Neri is cruciform in plan with thick adobe walls, wooden vigas, and carved corbels dating to the original 18th century construction. Like most colonial churches in New Mexico, it uses the aisleless (single-nave) plan with a polygonal apse. The apse, transepts, and crossing have a raised ceiling, and there is a low choir loft over the main entrance. The church is notable for its fusion of elements from different periods, with a "skin" of Victorian embellishments applied to the more traditional adobe forms. The exterior features twin bell towers, added around 1861, which show a vernacular adaptation of the Gothic Revival style using local materials. Interior details from the same period include the altar and pulpit, which are constructed from wood painted to look like marble, tongue-and-groove wainscoting, and wooden cabinetry in the sacristy. The pressed tin ceiling was added in 1916.

== Other buildings ==
The church property includes several ancillary buildings which are also of historical interest.

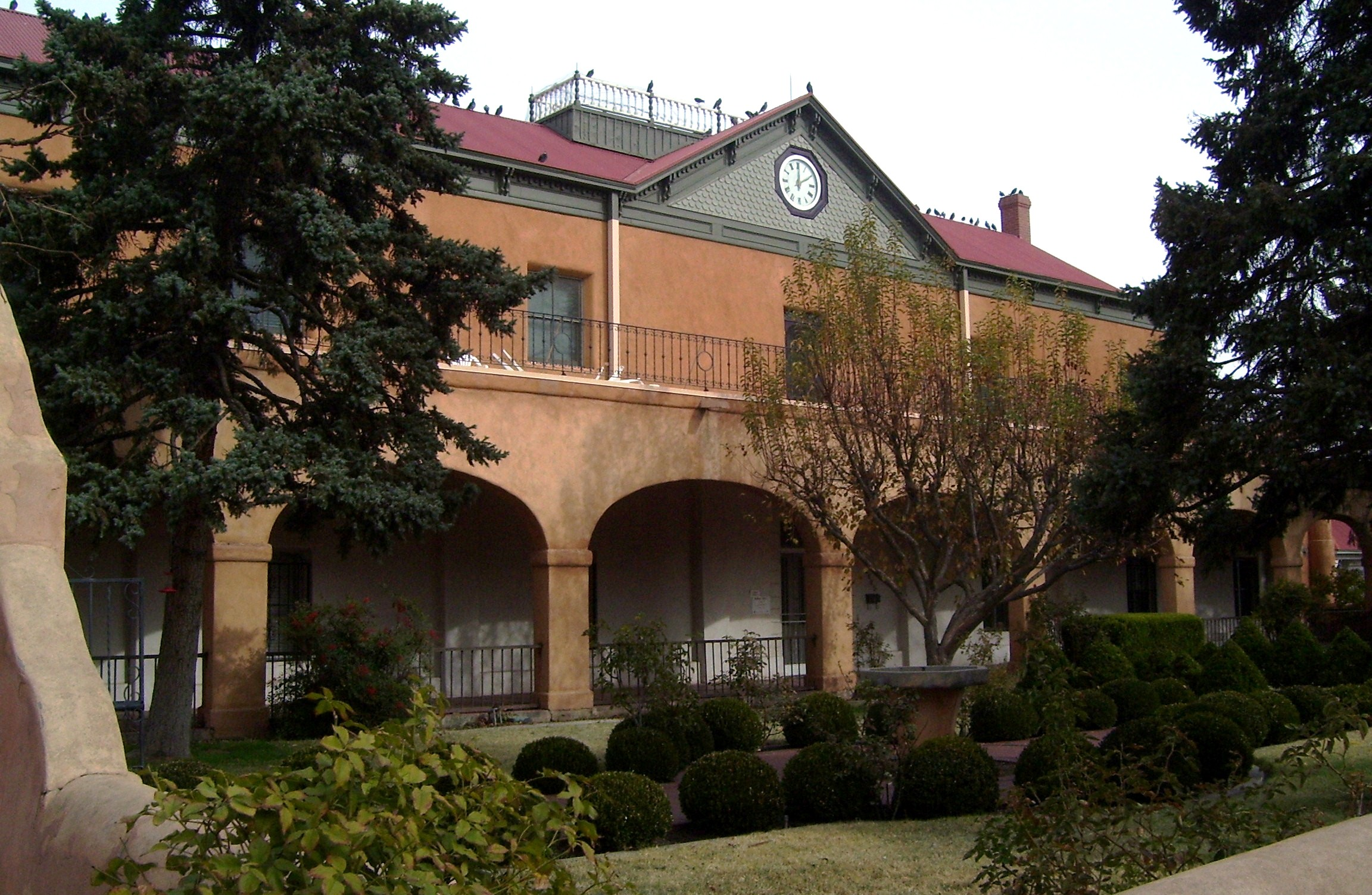
The rectory in 2012

=== Rectory ===
The rectory, also known as Moreno Hall, stands east of the church on the site of the original convento built in the 1790s. Rebuilt around 1890 by the Jesuits, the present rectory is a rectangular, two-story building of stuccoed brick with a wide portico, cross-gabled roof, and widow's walk. The west gable has a decorative octagonal window, while a similar window on the front was replaced by a clock.

=== Our Lady of the Angels School ===
This was Albuquerque's first public school, built by the Jesuits in 1878. It is a one-story, gable-roofed building with a wooden cupola and particularly fine Territorial style trim. The school is separately listed on the National Register of Historic Places.

=== Sister Blandina Convent ===
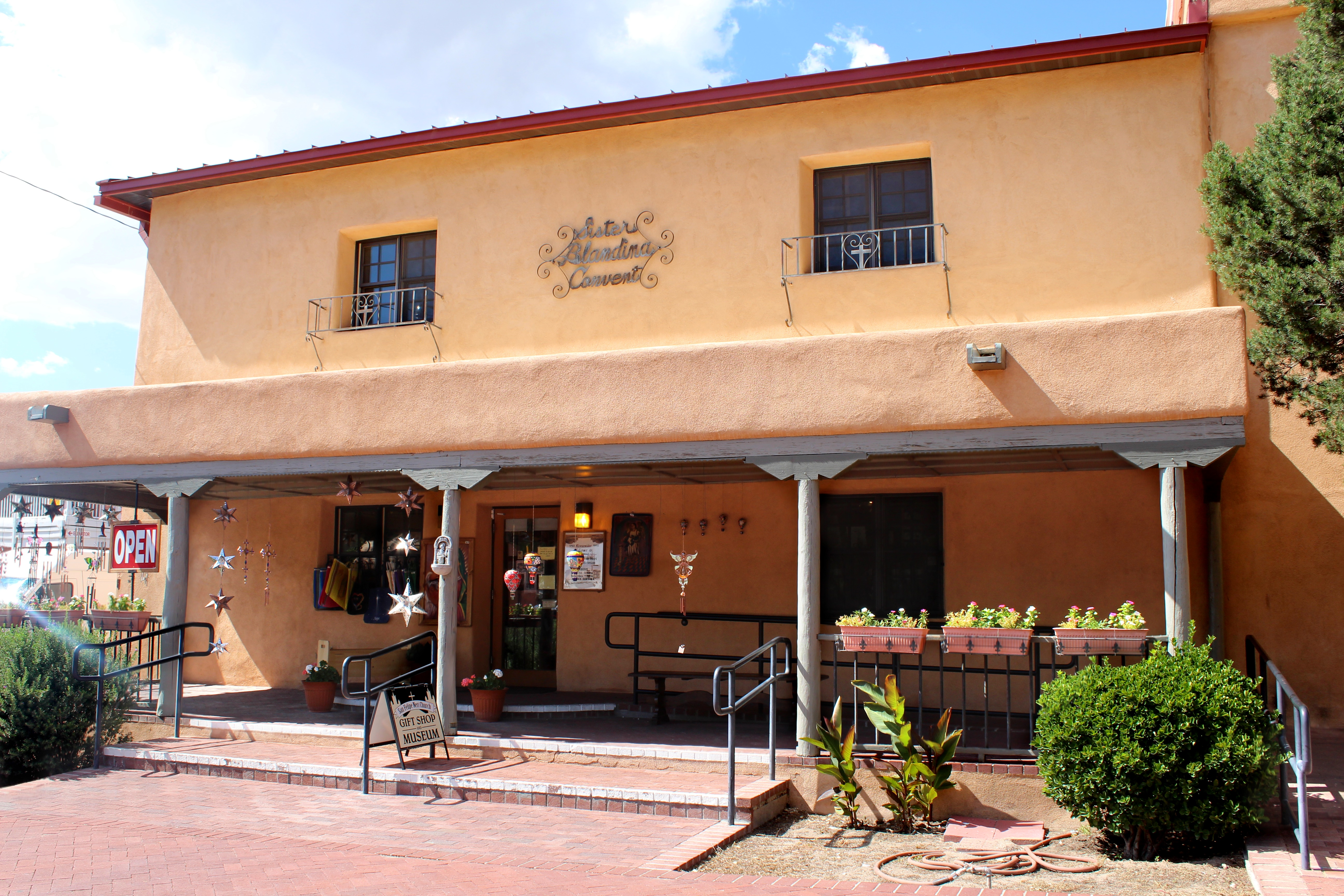
The convent in 2014

The convent, attached to the west side of the church, was built in 1881 for the Sisters of Charity and was said to be the first two-story adobe building in Old Town. This proved challenging for the local builders and required an Italian mason to be brought from Santa Fe to lay the stone foundation. It is named for Blandina Segale, who helped to supervise its construction and became famous for her many exploits in the West. The convent was staffed by the Sisters until the late 1970s.

=== Outbuildings ===
Also on the church property are a modest Territorial-style barn, stable, and parish hall. The buildings are organized around a central courtyard.
