= Antonio Vigil House =

Historic house in New Mexico, United States

- U.S. National Register of Historic Places
- NM State Register of Cultural Properties
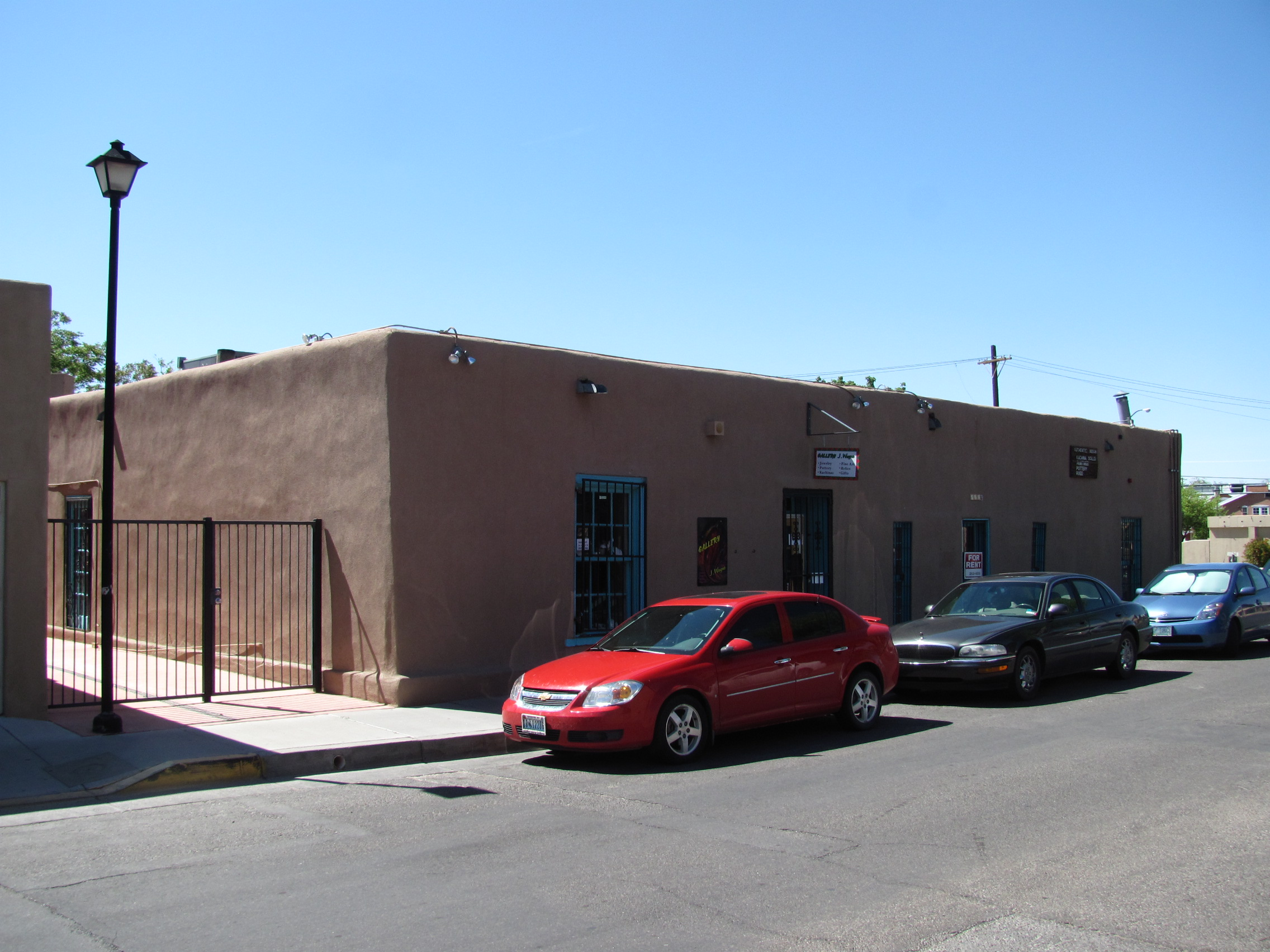
- The house in 2010

- Location within New Mexico Location within the United States
- Location: 413 Romero St. NW, Albuquerque, New Mexico
- Coordinates: 35°5′52″N 106°40′12″W
- Built: 1879
- NRHP reference No.: 78001809
- NMSRCP No.: 459

Significant dates
- Added to NRHP: May 5, 1978
- Designated NMSRCP: July 30, 1976

The Antonio Vigil House is a historic building in the Old Town neighborhood of Albuquerque, New Mexico. It was built in 1879 as a rental property by Santiago Baca, a wealthy landowner who moved with his family to Albuquerque from Pecos, New Mexico in 1874. The home's original occupant was Albert Grunsfeld, a German Jewish merchant for whom Albuquerque's oldest Jewish congregation, Congregation Albert, is named. The Baca family sold the house in 1900, and after two changes of ownership, it ended up in the hands of Pilar Vigil in 1904. Her son Antonio Vigil lived there from 1922 to 1961 and the Vigil family continued to own the property at least into the 1970s. At some point the building was converted to commercial use. It was added to the New Mexico State Register of Cultural Properties in 1976 and the National Register of Historic Places in 1978.

The house is a one-story, flat-roofed building constructed from terrones, large adobe bricks, with outer walls 27 inches (69 cm) thick. The architecture is based on the traditional Territorial Style, but utilizes more modern features like milled lumber, large windows, and wrought iron grillwork, which were becoming increasingly available at the time in New Mexico. The house has an off-center entrance door opening into a hallway with three rooms to the south and a double row of rooms on the north. Some of the rooms have surviving brick floors and corner fireplaces. The ceilings are 11 feet (3.4 m) high, higher than in most older adobe homes.
