= Betty Sabo =

American painter and sculptor (1928 - 2016)

- Born: Betty Jean Beals; September 15, 1928; Kansas City, Missouri, U.S.
- Died: May 10, 2016 (aged 87); Albuquerque, New Mexico
- Known for: Painting, sculpting

Betty Sabo (Betty Jean Beals; née Angelos Sabo; September 15, 1928 – May 10, 2016) was an American landscape painter and sculptor. She is best known for her realistic oils of New Mexico landscapes.

== Early life ==
Sabo was born in Kansas City, Missouri. Graduating in 1945, from Albuquerque High School, art began and majoring in art at the University of New Mexico, she studied for five years with the German-born artist Carl von Hassler.

== Painting and sculpture ==
Her paintings are based on sketches, notes, and photographs taken on location, which are brought back to her studio where she finishes her compositions. As well as New Mexico scenes, Sabo took a keen interest in Arizona and Colorado landscapes.

In 1988, during a visit by Ronald Reagan to Albuquerque, Governor Garrey Carruthers presented the President with a Nambé platter and an oil painting by Betty Sabo.

She was awarded the Award of Distinction by the Albuquerque Museum Foundation in 1991. The award was designated for "an individual who has successfully served the Foundation in an outstanding leadership capacity." It was noted during the award presentation, that Sabo was one of the Foundation's strongest advocates in the community, spending much of her enormous energy explaining, defending and promoting the arts.

In 2012, Governor Susana Martinez proclaimed February 10, 2012 as Betty Sabo Day, in recognition for Sabo's artistic career and community work.

=== Exhibitions ===
Her work has been displayed in major exhibits in New York City at the American Academy of Art, National Academy of Design, National Arts Club and American Academy; and in Santa Fe at the Museum of New Mexico.

Her paintings and sculptures are included in several art collections held by the Phelps Dodge Corporation, United New Mexico Banks, PNM Resources, University of New Mexico Hospital, City of Albuquerque Mayor's Office, and the Albuquerque Museum.

In 1992, Sabo was invited by the State Department to display one of her paintings in the American Embassy in Moscow, Russia.

== Pop culture ==
The documentary "Betty Sabo – an artful life" premiered on KASA-TV on February 11, 2012.
