= Sister Blandina =

American religious sister (1850–1941)

Servant of God Blandina Segale SC

Personal details
- Born: Rosa Maria Segale; 23 January 1850 Cicagna, Kingdom of Sardinia
- Died: 23 February 1941 (aged 91) Cincinnati, Ohio, United States

Blandina Segale, more commonly known as Sister Blandina (born Rosa Maria Segale; 23 January 1850 – 23 February 1941), was an Italian-born Sister of Charity of Cincinnati. She became widely known through her service as a missionary on the American frontier in the late 19th century. During her missionary work, she met, among others, Billy the Kid and the leaders of the Native American tribes of the Apache and Comanche. She served as an educator and social worker who worked in Ohio, Colorado and New Mexico, assisting Native Americans, Hispanic settlers and European immigrants.

In 2014, the Archdiocese of Santa Fe opened a process to beatify Segale, granting her the title Servant of God.

== Biography ==
Rosa Maria Segale was born in 1850 in Cicagna, which was at that time part of the Kingdom of Sardinia. She emigrated at age four with her family to the United States, where they settled in Cincinnati, Ohio. She had felt called from an early age to join the Sisters of Charity of Cincinnati. She did so at the age of sixteen. Upon the investiture she given the religious name Blandina, in honour of St. Blandina. On December 8, 1868, she made her first vows. Her biological sister Maria Maddalena decided to join the Sisters of Charity, too, where she was given the religious name Justina.

Segale was sent to teach in the schools of Steubenville and Dayton. In November 1872 she was being sent to serve as a missionary in Trinidad, Colorado, where the Sisters of Charity of Cincinnati had recently opened a mission. She was later sent to Santa Fe, where she co-founded public and Catholic schools throughout the area. During her time in New Mexico, she worked with the poor, the sick and immigrants. She also advocated on behalf of Hispanics and Native Americans who were losing their land to swindlers.

Segale traveled alone on dusty trails and railroads, through the unexplored lands of the far Southwest, finally reaching Trinidad, a frontier mining town, on December 9, 1872. After opening a school almost alone, her first action was to fight against the common practice of lynching. She came to learn from one of her students that a member of the gang led by the famed outlaw Billy the Kid had been seriously wounded, and had been left alone to die in a shack. She immediately went to him and, as she examined the wound, spoke harshly to his persecutors saying, "I see that with a hard head that you find yourself not able to kill him with one shot to the head." Without another word, she treated the bandit and saved the man's life.

In December 1873, Segale received a letter from her mother superior, directing her to move to Santa Fe. Despite the scarcity of funding and resources, Segale founded several schools and orphanages, continued to visit the mines in the area and railway construction sites to minister to the people there. She managed to collect funds for the construction of St. Vincent Hospital and for the care of the indigent. She visited and took care of Billy the Kid and other prisoners confined in the main prison in New Mexico.

In 1882, Segale was charged with the reconstruction of the sisters' dilapidated convent in Albuquerque. She also attempted to build a hospital there but was recalled in 1889 to Trinidad, where she defended the right of the Sisters of Charity to teach in the local school while wearing their religious habit. However, anti-Catholic prejudice prevailed and Segale was forced to return to Albuquerque where, in 1901, she completed the construction of St. Joseph Hospital.

Segale returned to Cincinnati, where she worked with her sister for the Italian immigrant community until her death at the age of 91, on February 23, 1941.

== Legacy ==
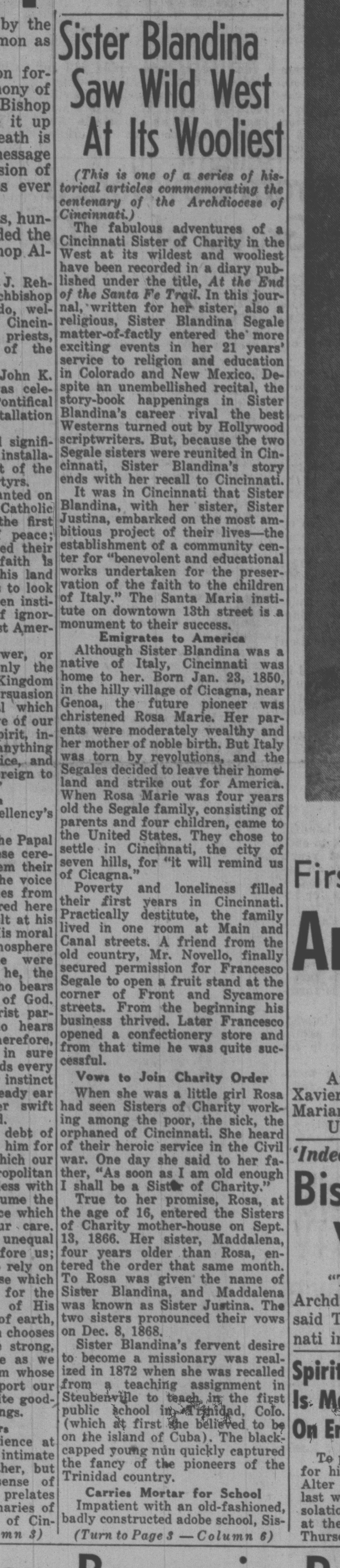
A news story on Segale

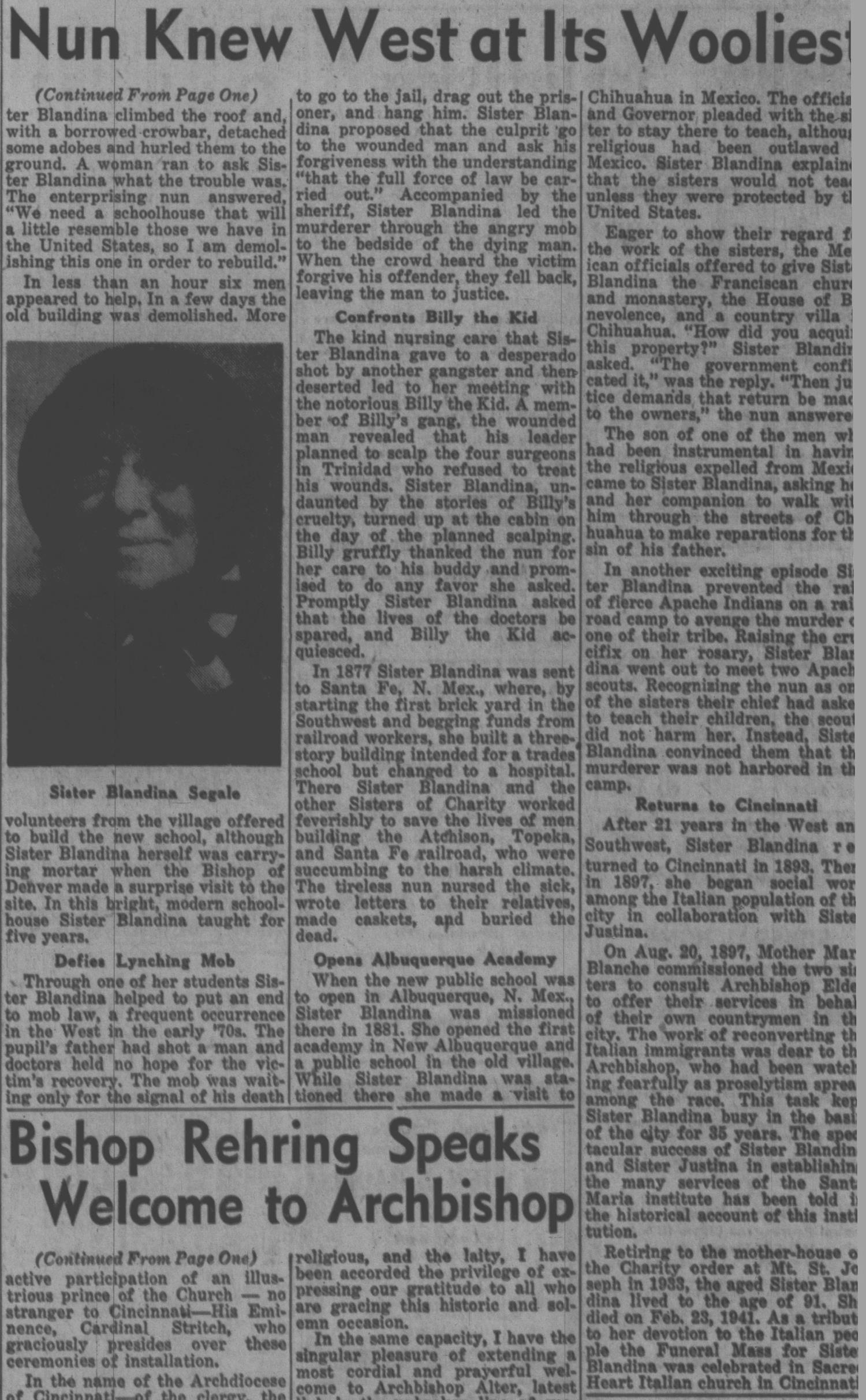
Segale news article (continued)

Most of the research about Segale was undertaken by the religious congregation she belonged to and by the Library of Cicagna, the town in the Fontanabuona Valley from which her family originated. She was known as the "nun with spurs". Necessary, it was also busy with its own article to the newspaper the Port Informer Genoa.

In June 2003 a character based on her co-starred in the episode of Magico Vento (Italian comic published by Sergio Bonelli Editore) titled "Jericho". The editorial page titled Blizzard Gazette of that number is dedicated to her story. In issue #74 (Niagara Falls, August 2003), Gianfranco Manfredi, series creator and curator of the publication, says that the story of Segale generated a lot of interest from readers, many of whom demanded her return.

Segale was portrayed in two episodes of the syndicated western television series, Death Valley Days. The first was the 1966 episode "The Fastest Nun in the West", hosted by Ronald W. Reagan. Julie Sommars portrayed the Sister as she sought justice for a killer, despite heavy sentiment for his hanging. In the 1967 episode "Lost Sheep in Trinidad", Mariette Hartley played Segale. She aids a seriously wounded outlaw that tells her of his friend and avenger, Billy the Kid.

WKRC in Cincinnati produced an Emmy award winning documentary on Sister Blandina's life called “Sister Blandina Segale: A Cincinnati Saint."

The Dallas Theater Center announced the world premiere of The Making of a Saint, by K.J. Sanchez, a play set around the petition for Segale's beatification as part of the 2026-2027 season. It will be played at the Wyly Studio Theater.

=== Legends ===
In 1875, Segale helped Morris James, a man convicted of murder in Trinidad on 3 July 1875, receive forgiveness from the man he shot and protected him from a mob. James was later pardoned and admitted to a "lunatic asylum" in April 1876. James's daughter wrote to Segale years later in Cincinnati and thanked her for her "loving, dauntless, courageous heart."

Segale's encounters with Old West outlaws later became the stuff of legend and were the subject of an episode of the CBS series Death Valley Days. The episode, called The Fastest Nun in the West, focused on her efforts to save a man from a lynch mob.

According to one story, she received a tip that Billy the Kid was coming to her town to scalp the four doctors who had refused to treat his friend's gunshot wound. Segale nursed the friend to health, and when Billy came to Trinidad, Colorado, to thank her, she asked him to abandon his violent plan. He agreed.

Another story says Billy the Kid and his gang attempted to rob the covered wagon in which she was traveling on the frontier. When he looked inside, he saw Segale. At that, Billy the Kidd simply tipped his hat and rode off in deference to her safety and the debt he owed her.

Many of the tales were recorded in letters Segale wrote to her sister, and which were later published in a book entitled At the End of the Santa Fe Trail.

=== Correspondence ===
Segale's experiences in areas east of the Rio Grande and south of the Sangre de Cristo Mountains (in Santa Fe County, New Mexico) were told through her diary At the End of the Santa Fe Trail, first published by Columbian Press in 1932, reprinted by Bruce Publishing, Milwaukee, Wisconsin, 1948). The book was based on the letters she exchanged with her sister Justine, who was also a religious sister in Ohio, with whom she enjoyed a long letter-writing relationship (the book was published in Italy in the mid-nineties with the title An Italian Nun in the West.)

=== Quotes ===
Segale fought against the injustices committed against the Native Americans and supported their civil rights; she wrote: "Poor wild hearts, how they feel full of anger and treated unfairly."

In her letters, Segale referred to Billy the Kid: "His eyes were blue-gray, rosy complexion, and the air of a little boy... [looking no] more than seventeen years. He was an innocent, if not for the iron firmness of purpose, good or bad, that we read in the corner of my eye;... could choose the right path and instead chose the wrong."

When she learned of his death, she noted: "Poor Billy the Kid, thus ending the career of a young man who started down the slope at the age of twelve to avenge an insult that had been done to his mother."

=== Sainthood process ===
Segale was the inspiration for a new direction for the CHI St. Joseph's Children Catholic charity in Albuquerque. The organization focuses on funding women to make home visits to low-income mothers and babies. Allen Sánchez and members of the charity were the first supporters for Segale's canonization. Archbishop Michael Sheehan of Santa Fe opened the sainthood cause in 2014.

On 25 August 2015, supporters and researchers research to the Archdiocese of Santa Fe for her canonization process. Segale is the first person in New Mexico's over 400-year history to be vetted for sainthood. Peso Chavez, a private investigator was hired to help make the case. A 2025 report noted that Segale was close to being declared Venerable.
