= New Mexico Museum of Natural History and Science =

- Established: 1986
- Location: Albuquerque, New Mexico, U.S.
- Coordinates: 35.0981°N 106.6655°W
- Type: Science museum
- Website: nmnaturalhistory.org

The New Mexico Museum of Natural History and Science is a natural history and science museum in Albuquerque, New Mexico near Old Town Albuquerque. The Museum was founded in 1986. It operates as a public revenue facility of the New Mexico Department of Cultural Affairs.

== History ==
The museum was created by an act of the New Mexico Legislature signed into law by Governor Bruce King in March 1980. Part of the motivation for the project was to provide a home for some of the numerous dinosaur fossils discovered in New Mexico rather than sending them to out-of-state institutions. Ground was broken on a 4.8-acre (1.9 ha) site near Old Town and the museum opened on January 11, 1986. It was one of the first new natural history museums in the U.S. in decades and represented an updated approach focusing on interactive multimedia exhibits rather than large collections of specimens displayed in glass cases. An astronomy center including an observatory and planetarium was added to the museum in 1999. This was originally a separate museum operated by the University of New Mexico, but was merged into the Museum of Natural History and Science in 2007.

== Permanent exhibits ==
Time Tracks, the Museum's permanent exhibit halls illustrate a journey through time, covering the birth of the Universe (≈13.6 billion years ago) to the Ice Age (≈10,000 years ago). The eight journey through time halls are as follows:

- Bradbury Stamm Construction Hall of Ancient Life
- Dawn of the Dinosaurs
- Jurassic Age of Super Giants
- New Mexico's Seacoast
- Age of Volcanoes
- Rise of the Recent - Evolving Grasslands
- Cave Experience
- New Mexico's Ice Age

Other permanent exhibits include an interactive planetarium where programs are held daily. There is also a floor of exhibit galleries dedicated to astronomy and space exploration, as well as an observation deck for viewing through the telescope. The observatory opens only occasionally, usually during evenings when the museum itself is open to the public. The Fossilworks exhibit shows people removing material from fossilized dinosaur bones. The museum houses a "Naturalist Center" that is home to live animals and insects, and there is also a geologic exhibit on the minerals of the region.

== Temporary exhibits ==
Current Exhibits Back to Bones features "everything from 300-million-year-old fish and early reptiles, dinosaur skulls from near the end of the Age of Reptiles, to Ice Age mammals," according to Paleontology Curator Thomas A. Williamson. The exhibit was originally conceived to showcase New Mexican fossils not only to the public, but also to visiting members of the Society of Vertebrate Paleontology during Albuquerque's hosting of the SVP meeting in October 2018. The exhibit was renewed in October 2019 and was still on display as of January 2021.

Previous Exhibits Until early 2017, the New Mexico Museum of Natural History was home to STARTUP: Albuquerque and the Personal Computer Revolution. This exhibit was dedicated to the history of the personal computer and operated for ten years, being based on a concept by Microsoft co-founder Paul G. Allen, who along with Bill Gates started Microsoft in Albuquerque. In May 2007, two exhibits in the STARTUP Gallery won MUSE awards from the American Alliance of Museums: Pizza Run - A Slice of Programming won a Silver Level MUSE Award in the category of Interactive Kiosks, and the artifact theater Rise of the Machines won a Gold Level MUSE Award in the Multimedia Installations Category. In 2017, the museum relinquished control of this exhibit to Paul Allen to use at his Living Computer Museum + Labs in Seattle, WA.

The museum previously hosted an exhibit entitled Wild Music from June 2017 through January 2018. The exhibit showcased an interactive collection of both natural and artificial musical displays on the second floor, all with fully bilingual signage. Acoustical physics and musical theory are presented in various ways and from various parts of the world.

In February 2018 through August of the same year, the museum brought in Da Vinci: The Genius to display recreations of the art and scientific inventions of Leonardo da Vinci. Produced by Grande Exhibitions, the replicas of da Vinci's art and machines focused on the extraordinary achievements of one of the renaissance's most famous and influential people. Composed of two distinct sections, Da Vinci: The Genius firstly looked deeply into his art, taking a forensic approach to dissecting the Mona Lisa with "The Secrets of Mona Lisa". Secondly, "The Inventions" portion showed 75 separate devices, both small scale and life-sized, invented by Leonardo da Vinci.

Picturing the Past was a juried exhibition of paleo-art. The gallery featured art from artists worldwide, focusing on prehistoric creatures. The work of local paleoartist Matt Celeskey featured heavily. This exhibit was on display through January 2019.

Drugs: Costs and Consequences was an exhibit that discussed illicit drugs. The exhibit was on display until December 8, 2019.

Brain: The Inside Story was a traveling exhibition on loan from the American Museum of Natural History. It used hands-on displays to explore senses, emotions, and brain development. Using current research and technology, the exhibit focused on the latest in neuroscience to highlight the brain's amazing abilities in function and adaptation. This exhibit was at the museum until November 10, 2019, after which it was permanently retired, and did not go on to be displayed elsewhere.

Upcoming Exhibits No upcoming exhibits are currently available.

=== Dinosaurs exhibited ===
The Jurassic Super Giants exhibit features the complete skeletons of Seismosaurus, Saurophaganax, Stegosaurus, and one leg of a Brachiosaurus. Previously, in the museum's atrium was the skeleton of Stan, a Tyrannosaurus rex measuring forty feet (≈12.2 meters) in length and twelve feet (≈3.7 meters) in height, the second largest T. rex ever found. Stan currently resides at the Farmington Museum in Farmington, NM. Stan was replaced in the atrium during the summer of 2019 by an animatronic Bisti Beast, or Bistahieversor, dinosaur.

Bronze statues of two dinosaurs created by artist David A. Thomas, a Pentaceratops named "Spike" and an Albertosaurus named "Alberta", stand at the entrance. Spike and Alberta were installed at the museum in the mid-1980s, with Spike being put in place in 1985 and Alberta joining a few years later in 1987. Many dinosaur fossils have been found in New Mexico, and a few of the ones on display in the museum are only known from New Mexico.

== Other features ==
The Museum also houses changing exhibits, NatureWorks Discovery Store, as well as the Dynatheater, which is a 3-D theater similar to IMAX. The films shown are typically documentary style, focusing on a broad range of subjects. The exterior of the museum features "A Walk Through New Mexico," a landscape representation of the topographical and geologic features of New Mexico.

== Photo gallery ==
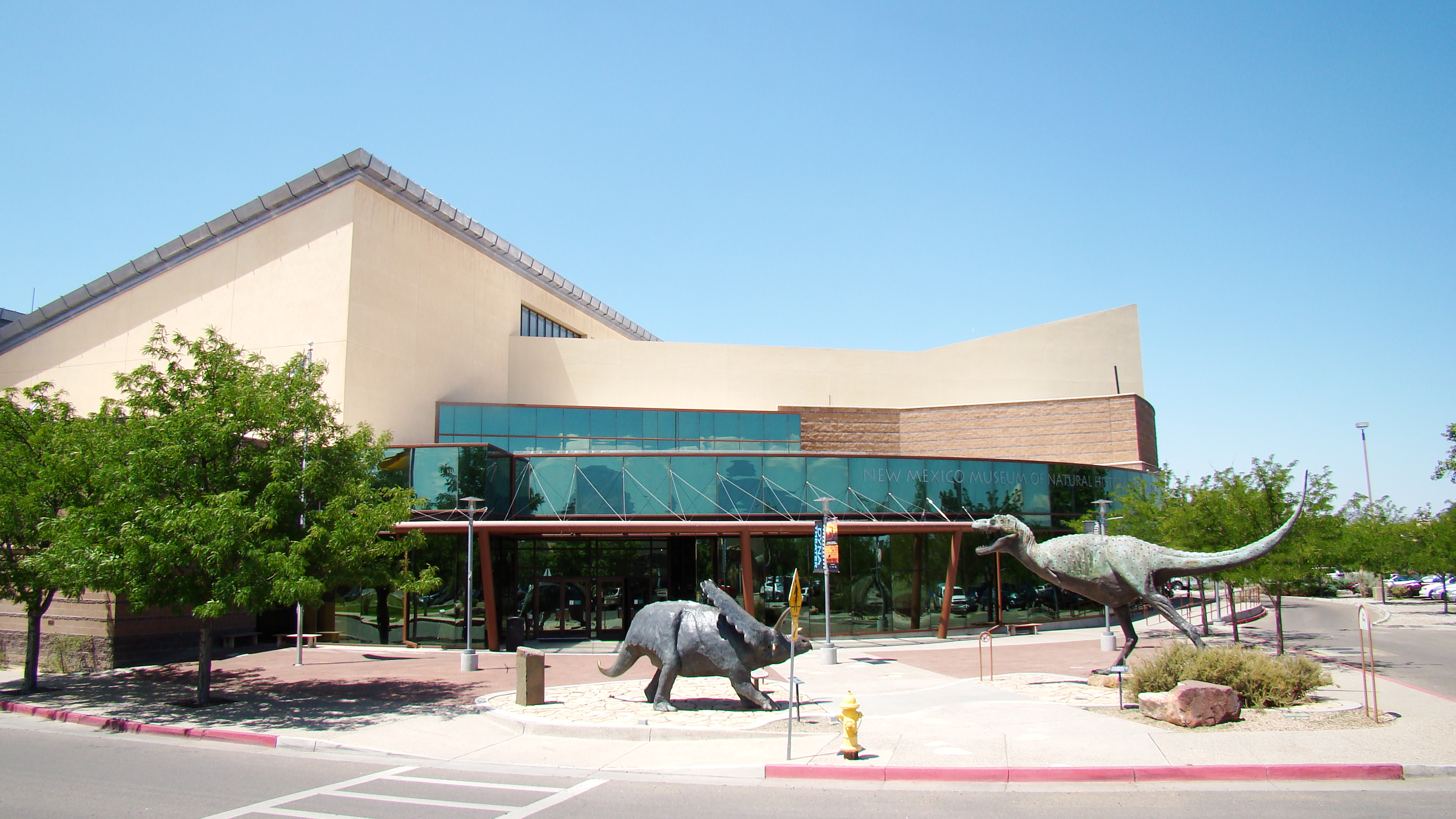
Main entrance, 2014

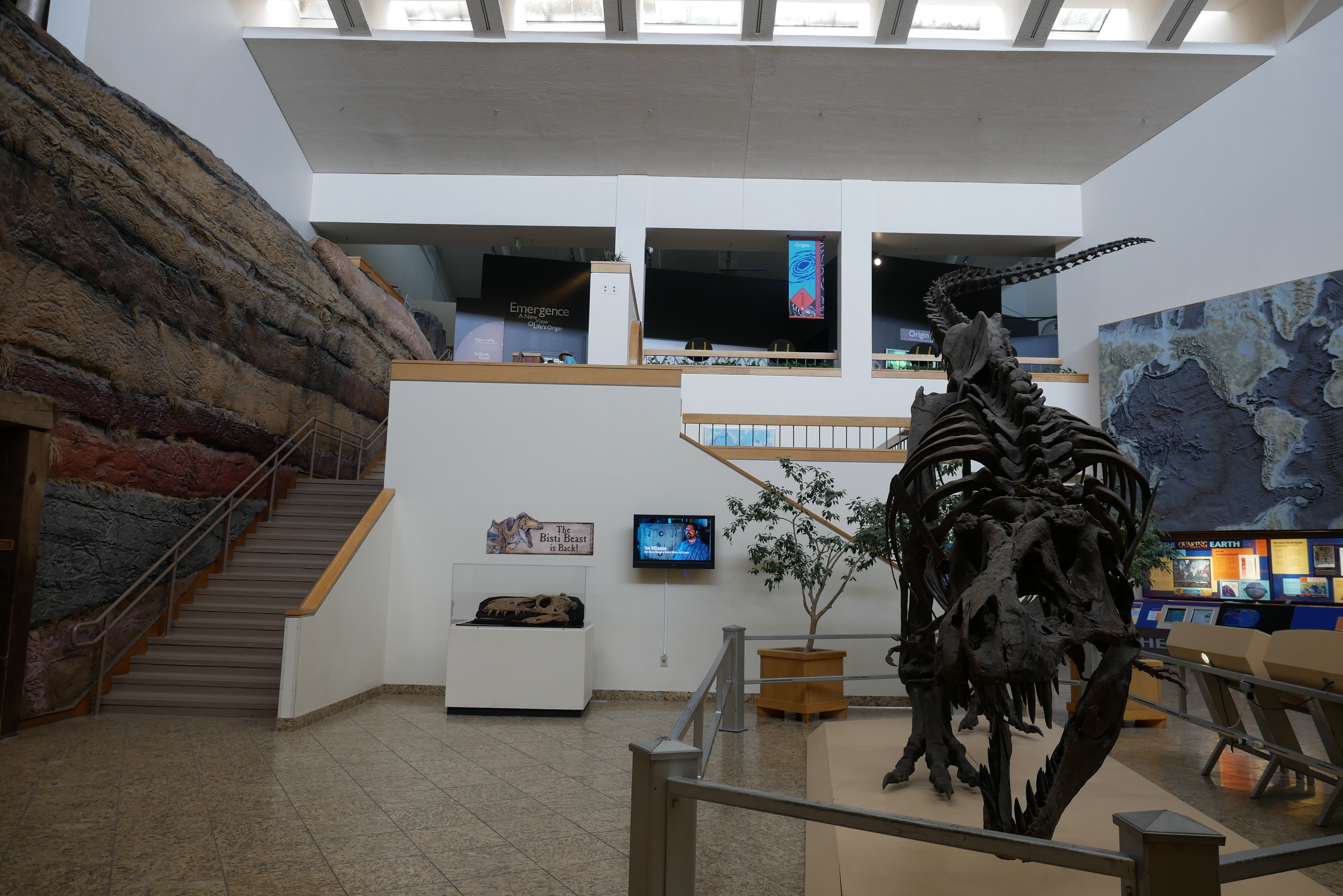
Museum entry, 2018

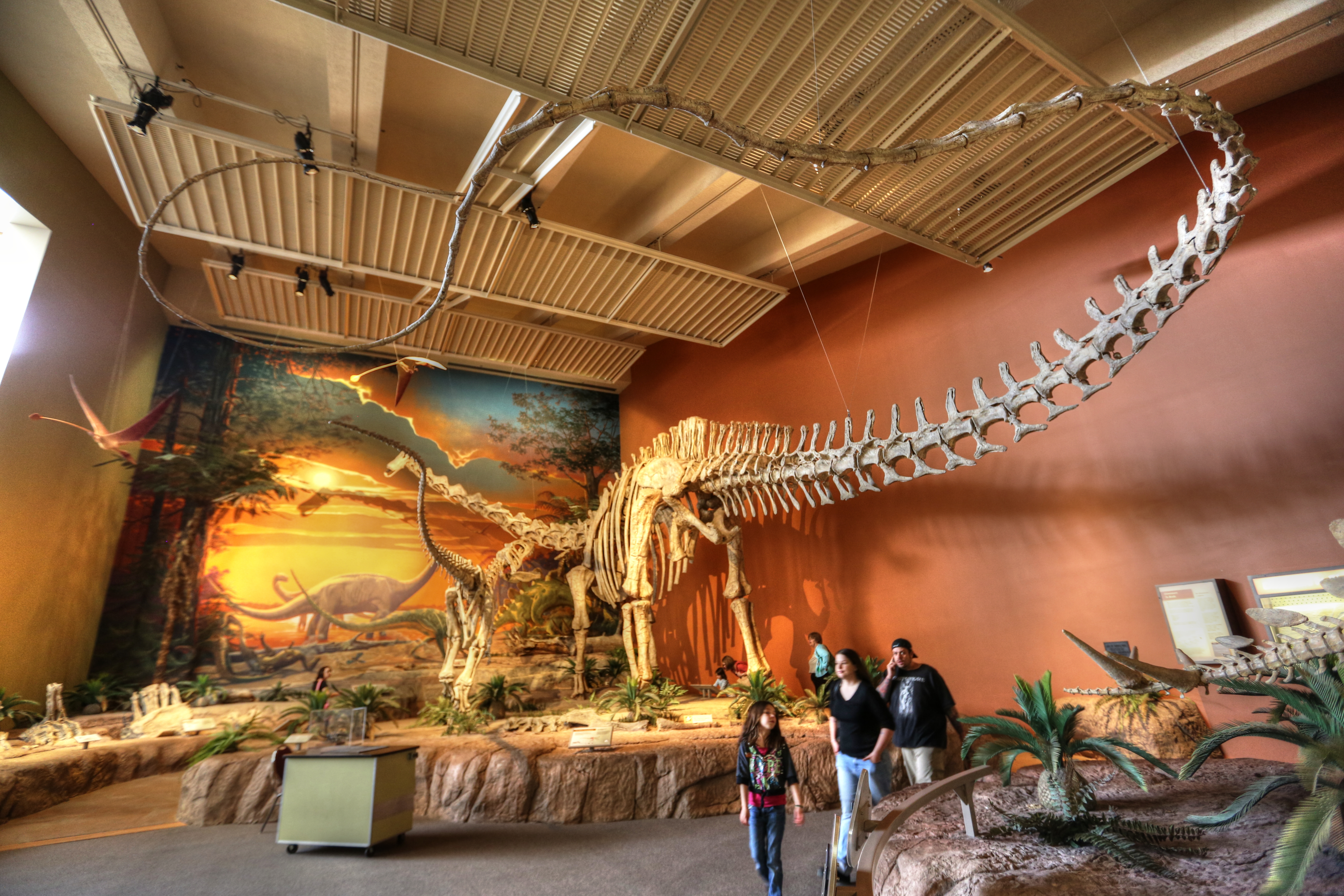
Family visiting the museum, 2013

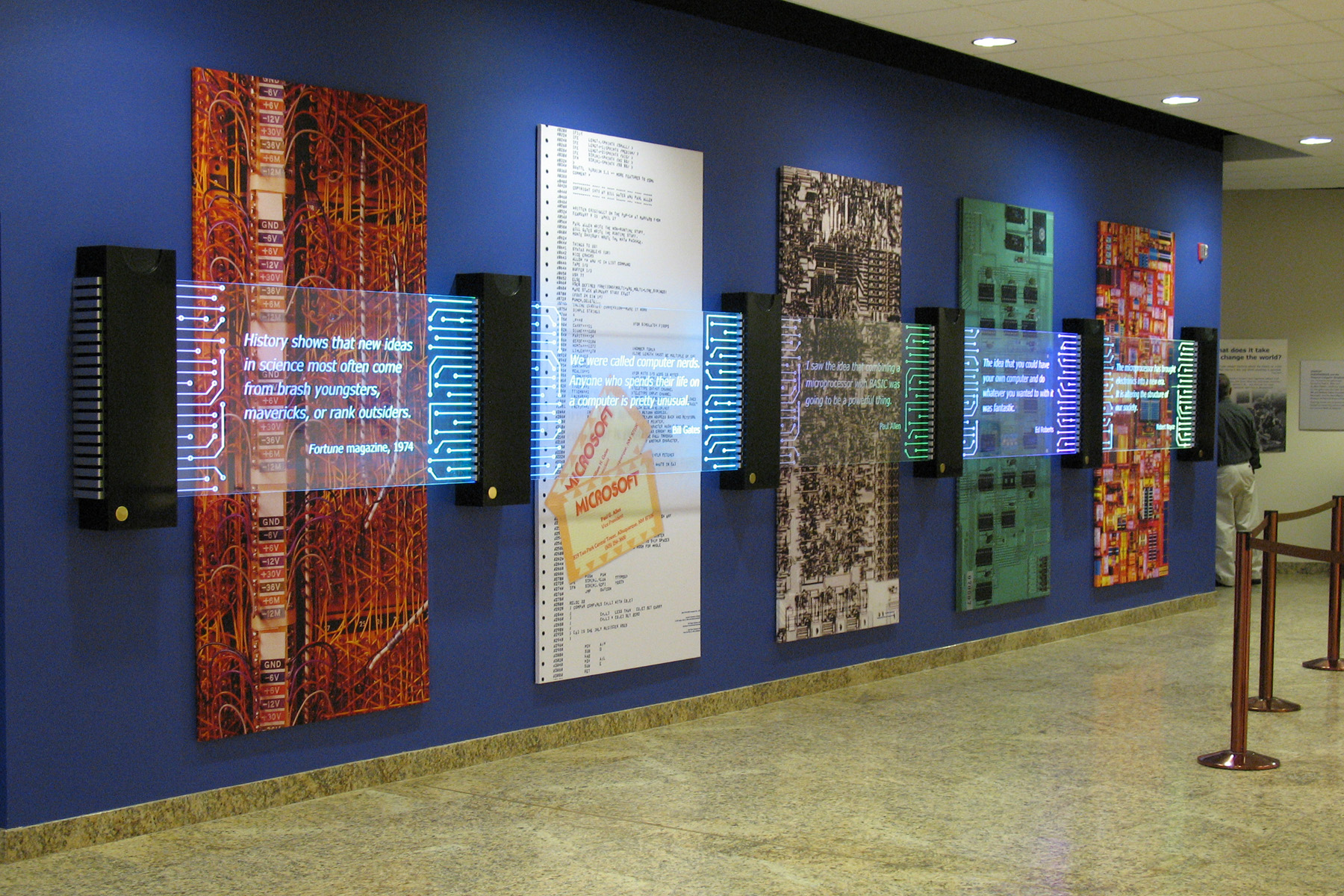
Entrance to "STARTUP: Albuquerque and the Personal Computer Revolution" wing, 2007

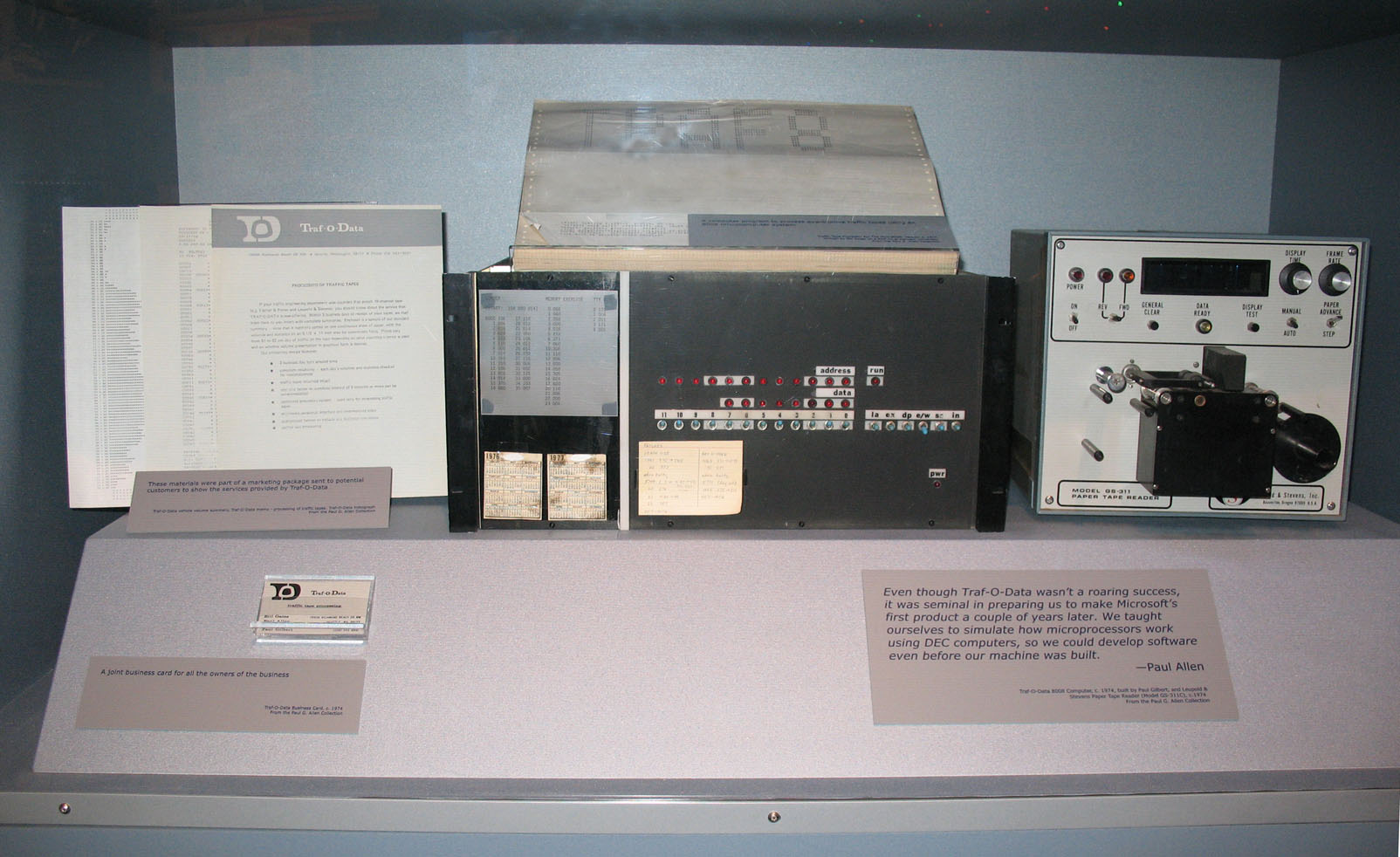
Traf-O-Data 8008 Computer, 2007
