= Our Lady of the Angels School (Albuquerque, New Mexico) =

- U.S. National Register of Historic Places
- NM State Register of Cultural Properties
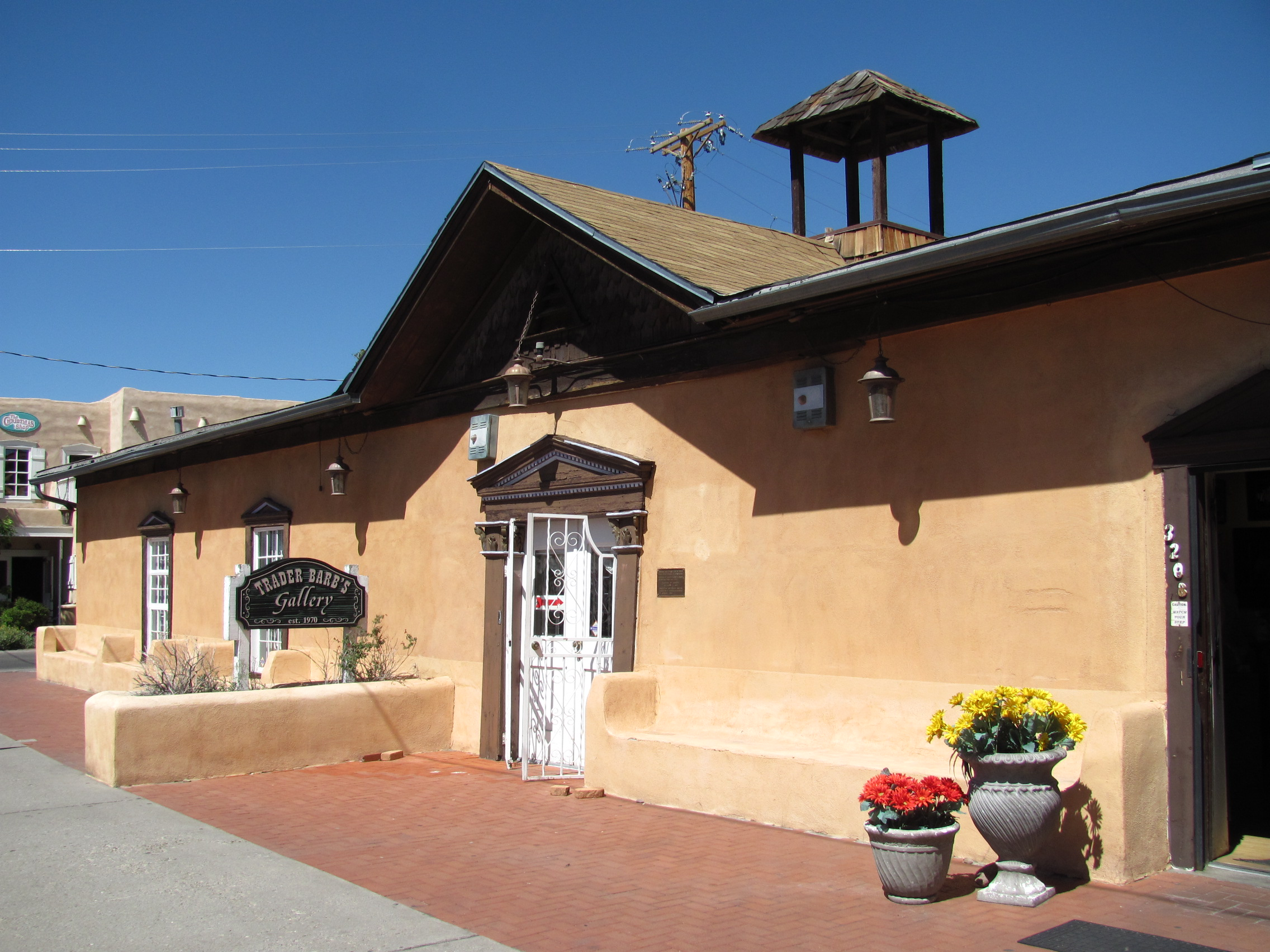

- Location within New Mexico Location within the United States
- Location: 320 Romero St., NW, Albuquerque, New Mexico
- Coordinates: 35°5′49″N 106°40′11″W
- Area: 0.4 acres (0.16 ha)
- Built: 1878
- Architectural style: Adobe Architecture
- NRHP reference No.: 84000426
- NMSRCP No.: 1025

Significant dates
- Added to NRHP: November 29, 1984
- Designated NMSRCP: August 17, 1984

Our Lady of the Angels School is a historic school in Albuquerque, New Mexico. It was built in 1878 and was added to the National Register of Historic Places in 1984.
