= Albuquerque Museum of Art and History =

Art and history museum in Albuquerque, New Mexico

Coordinates: 35°5′51″N 106°40′4″W

Albuquerque Museum
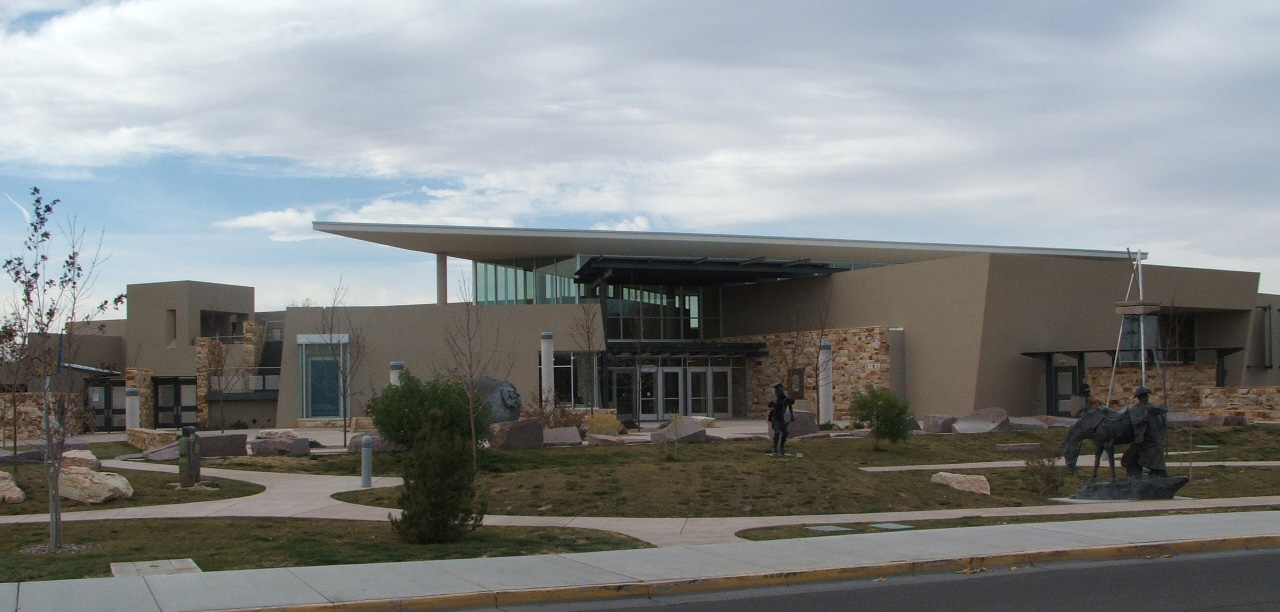
- Established: 1967
- Location: 2000 Mountain Road NW; Albuquerque, New Mexico
- Type: Art museum History museum
- Website: cabq.gov/museum/

The Albuquerque Museum, formerly known as the Albuquerque Museum of Art and History, is a public art and history museum in Albuquerque, New Mexico. It is located in the Old Town area and is operated by the City of Albuquerque Department of Arts & Culture.

The Albuquerque Museum is dedicated to preserving the art of the American Southwest and the history of Albuquerque and the Middle Rio Grande Valley of New Mexico. The museum also contributes significantly to the cultural and educational programs in the city of Albuquerque. The museum features art of the Southwest and its global influences, as well as 400 years of Albuquerque history with permanent installations and special exhibitions of national and international origin.

== History ==
The museum opened as the Museum of Albuquerque in 1967, operating out of a temporary location in the recently vacated Old Albuquerque Municipal Airport Building. In 1975, voters approved a bond issue to fund construction of a new, permanent location on the site of a former truck terminal in Old Town. The building was designed by local architect Antoine Predock and opened in 1979. A major expansion designed by Rohde May Keller McNamara Architecture (RMKM) was completed in 2005.

== Exhibits ==
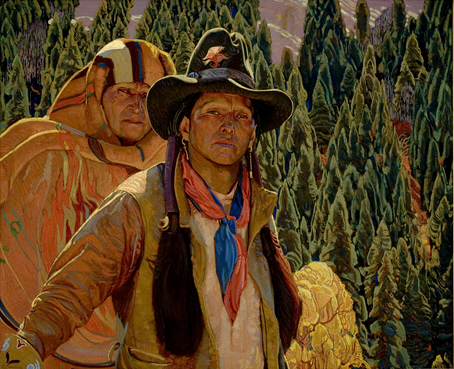
Star Road and White Sun by Ernest L. Blumenschein, 1920

The museum's permanent exhibits are dedicated to art in New Mexico, and the history of Albuquerque include early maps, conquistador armor, weavings, and other artifacts of colonial life in New Mexico. The museum also hosts changing exhibits, a massive photo archive, art galleries, and maintains an outdoor sculpture garden on the grounds. The museum's collections include 10,000 artworks, 35,000 historical objects, and 130,000 photographs in the photo archive.

=== Permanent exhibits ===
The museum has three permanent exhibits:

- Common Ground: Art in New Mexico
- Only in Albuquerque
- Sculpture Garden (the City of Albuquerque provides a mobile app guide to the Garden)

=== La Jornada ===
Located in the sculpture garden is the sculpture La Jornada, which was removed from public view in 2020 and later restored to the museum garden.

== Casa San Ysidro ==
The Albuquerque Museum also operates tours for a late 18th-century house in Corrales, New Mexico, called Casa San Ysidro. The house features a recreation of a 19th-century rancho, including a family chapel, a central plazuela and an enclosed corral area.
