= Red handprint =

Activist symbol

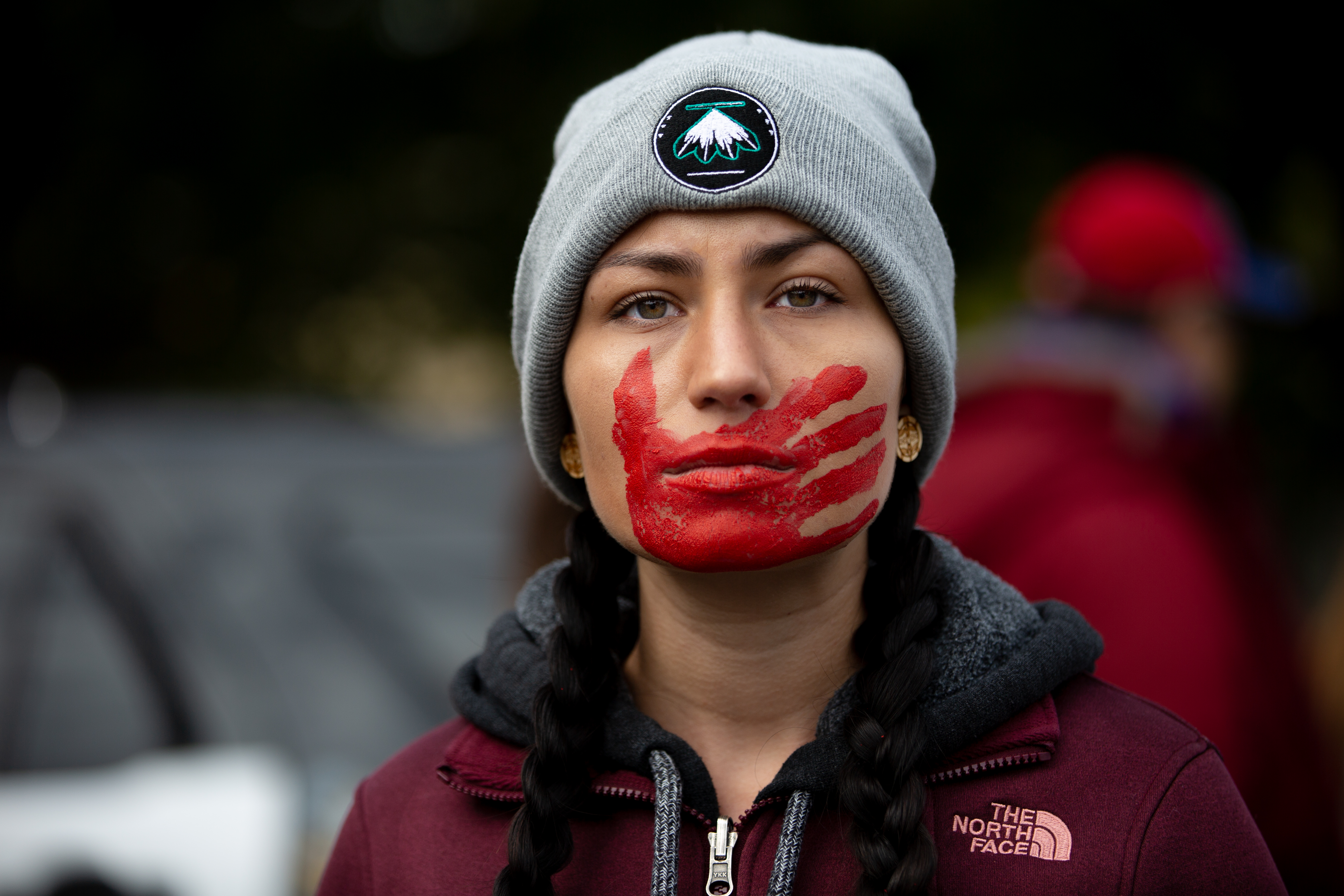
A woman with red handprint on her mouth in Rochester, Minnesota

A red handprint, usually painted across the mouth, is a symbol that is used to indicate solidarity with Missing and Murdered Indigenous Women and girls in North America, in recognition of the fact that Native American women are up to 10 times more likely to be murdered or sexually assaulted.

== Origin and symbolism ==
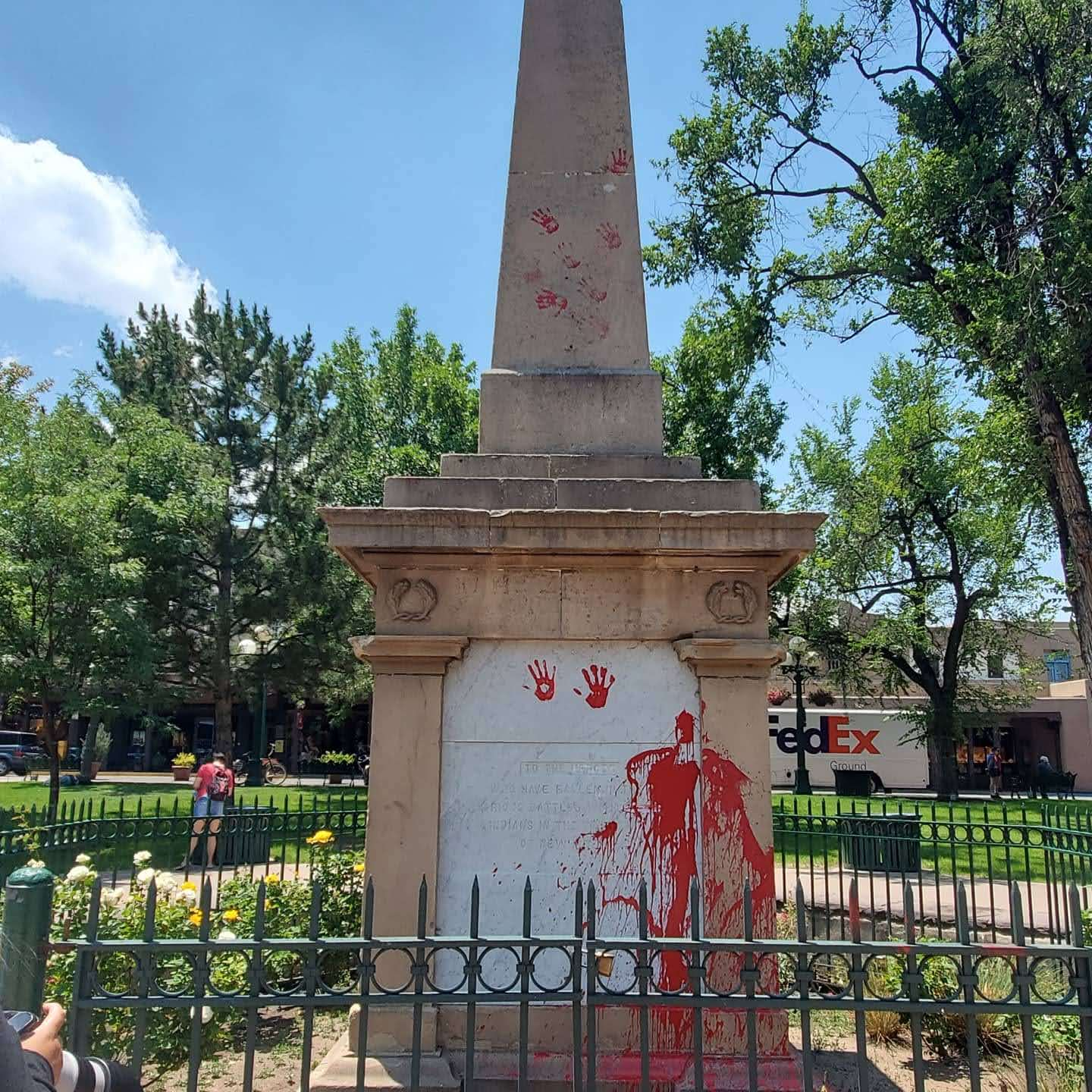
Red handprints marked on the Soldier's Monument on the plaza in Santa Fe, New Mexico in June 2020

The athlete Jordan Marie Daniel, a competitive runner from the Kul Wicasa Oyate (Lower Brule Sioux Tribe) in South Dakota, was the first to prominently make use of the symbol at the 2019 Boston Marathon. Daniel dedicated her run in 2019 to 26 missing or murdered Indigenous women. She stated that she wanted to use her platform to bring awareness to the women, so that they were seen, heard, and remembered. It was subsequently worn by athlete Rosalie Fish in 2019, appeared in billboard campaigns, and was used by Ilona Verley, who was a contestant on the reality television show Canada's Drag Race.

Red handprints symbolize silenced voices — the silence and lack of interest given to victimized Indigenous women, many of whom end up missing or murdered. In 2020, Rhiannon Johnson of CBC News reported on the case of Michelle Buckley of Hay River, N.W.T., who wore the red handprint in a photo shoot to honor her sister Rea, who died when she was 14. Buckley stated the aim of the photo shoot was "to raise awareness that missing and murdered Indigenous women is an issue that Indigenous people face, but it also was a form of healing".

== Individuals wearing the red handprint ==
=== Jordan Marie Daniel and Rosalie Fish ===
Rosalie Fish, a member of the Cowlitz Tribe in Washington and a student-athlete at the Iowa Central Community College, used her national running platform to honor the lives of missing and murdered Indigenous women after being inspired by the use of the symbol by Jordan Marie Daniels. During the state track and field meet Fish dedicated her running medals to missing and murdered Indigenous women, and placed the medals on a poster she made honoring them. The poster had pictures and names of four Indigenous women who had been murdered.

=== Ignacio High School Girls Basketball Team ===
At Ignacio High School, the Bobcats basketball team participated in team photos that honored missing and murdered Indigenous women. In the team photos, each team member and the coach wore a red or a black handprint to show solidarity to the Missing and Murdered Indigenous Women movement.

=== Ilona Verley and Canada’s Drag Race ===
In the first season of Canada's Drag Race, the contestant Ilona Verley, who is from the Nlaka'pamux Nation in British Columbia, was the first contestant to identify as two-spirit and as non-binary. For her final presence on Canada’s Drag Race, Verley wore a traditional jingle dress to represent her two-spirit identity and the red handprint to create further awareness towards the epidemic of missing and murdered Indigenous women. Verley was also featured in the Vogue article Indigenous Queen Ilona Verley On Bringing Two-Spirit Representation to Canada’s Drag Race in which she described her experience on Canada’s Drag Race, discussed the lingering impacts of the residential school system, and explained how she wanted to use her new platform to "spread awareness about her roots." She has subsequently used the symbol in social media posts.

=== D'Pharaoh Woon-A-Tai ===
At the 76th Primetime Emmy Awards in 2024, indigenous Canadian actor D'Pharaoh Woon-A-Tai wore a red handprint as a symbol of solidarity with missing and murdered indigenous women. The symbol gained substantial media coverage following the event.

== Billboard campaigns ==
The Native Justice Coalition created a billboard campaign towards the awareness of missing and murdered Indigenous women and Two-spirit people in Grand Haven, Michigan. The billboards consist of an Indigenous woman with a red handprint across their mouth. The billboard was created by Cecilia Lapointe of the Native Justice Coalition.

== See also ==
Media related to Red handprint at Wikimedia Commons

- Face tattoo § Inuit and Alaskan and Canadian Natives – Tattoo located on the bearer's face or head
