= George Floyd protests in New Mexico =

2020 civil unrest after the murder of George Floyd

- Part of George Floyd protests
- Date: May 28 – June 15, 2020 (2 weeks and 4 days)
- Location: New Mexico, United States
- Caused by: Police brutality; Institutional racism against African Americans; Reaction to the murder of George Floyd; Economic, racial and social inequality

This is a list of protests in New Mexico related to the murder of George Floyd.

== Locations ==
=== Albuquerque ===
Hundreds of people protested May 28, and tear gas was deployed, but no one was injured. Part of the city was shut down. Several shots were fired from a vehicle, and a police vehicle was damaged. Four people were taken into custody, including one who initially fled on foot. While officers were trying to process the scene, a group of people started to cause problems for the officers. One person allegedly used a baseball bat to hit several police vehicles, breaking the windows. On May 31, around 2,000 people attended a candlelight vigil to honor victims of police killings at the University of New Mexico. That same evening, hundreds more protesters marched along Route 66; the event started peacefully, but after midnight demonstrators started setting fires, smashing windows and looting a gun store. It was also reported that shots were fired at police officers, who deployed tear gas when protesters refused to leave the area.

On June 2, hundreds of protesters marched from the University of New Mexico campus to the Albuquerque Police Department headquarters, where they were joined by another group who had marched from downtown. The protesters gathered on the steps of the headquarters and called for police reform and justice for Floyd and others killed by police. Despite one report of graffiti, the event remained peaceful.

On June 15, during protests over the statue of Juan de Oñate, one protester was shot and seriously injured by a counter-protester. The statue was removed the following day.

=== Carlsbad ===
About 80 protesters demonstrated peacefully at the Eddy County Courthouse in the early evening of May 30.

=== Clovis ===
On June 5, around 200 protesters stood at the Clovis-Carver Public Library parking lot to protest the murder of George Floyd.

=== Farmington ===
On June 1, more than 400 people shouted "I can't breathe" at a protest organized by the San Juan College Young Democratic Socialists of America in front of the Animas Valley Mall.

=== Gallup ===
On June 3, some 150 protesters marched from the north side of town to downtown Gallup.

=== Las Cruces ===
On May 30, about 40 people protested peacefully at the intersection of Main Street and Picacho Avenue in the afternoon. On June 1 hundreds of protesters, including a number of NMSU basketball players, held signs that said "I can't breathe" and "get off my neck" in Las Cruces.

=== Los Alamos ===
In Los Alamos, approximately 200 people attended a protest on May 31, around 300 attended on June 4, and around 200 on June 6.

=== Rio Rancho ===
On June 6, about 100 people held a protest outside Rio Rancho's city hall to support Black Lives Matter.

=== Roswell ===
On June 1, a protest was held outside the Chaves County Courthouse in support of Black Lives Matter.

=== Santa Fe ===
On May 29, about 250 protesters marched to the New Mexico State Capitol to rally against police brutality. Traffic was briefly blocked as the protesters passed through the Santa Fe Plaza.

In October 12, as part of Indigenous Peoples' Day protests, a stone obelisk in the center of Santa Fe Plaza was toppled by protesters. The monument had long been opposed by activists, as it originally included a plaque commemorating soldiers who died fighting "savage Indians".
