= Soldiers' Monument (Santa Fe, New Mexico) =

Monument in Santa Fe, New Mexico

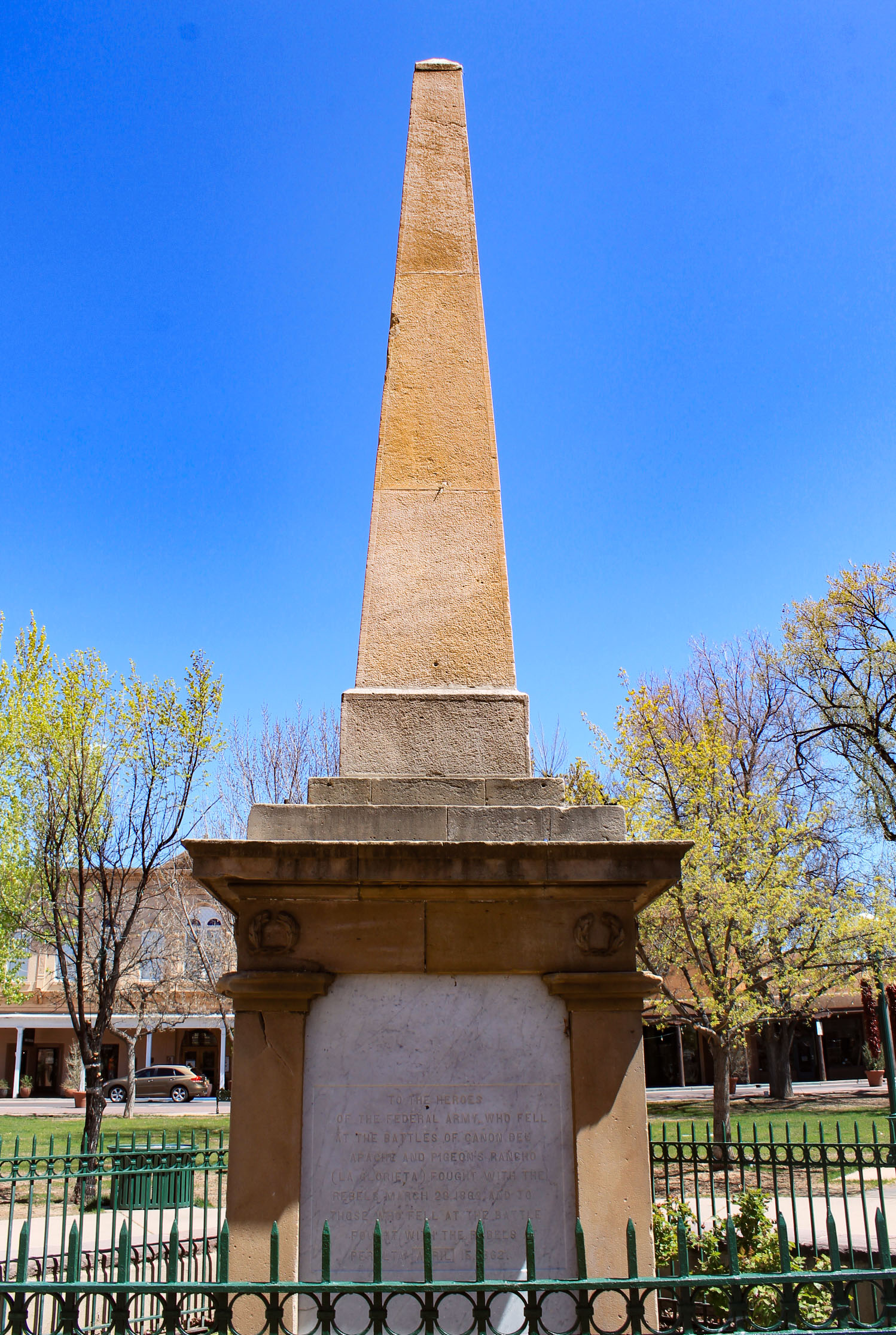
- Interactive map of Soldiers' Monument
- Location: Santa Fe Plaza, New Mexico
- Coordinates: 35°41′14.7474″N 105°56′18.6714″W
- Type: obelisk and plinth with engraved text
- Material: stone
- Height: 33 feet (10 m) (including obelisk)
- Dedicated date: 1868
- Dedicated to: Civil War soldiers and U.S. soldiers who battled with Native Americans
- Dismantled date: October 12, 2020

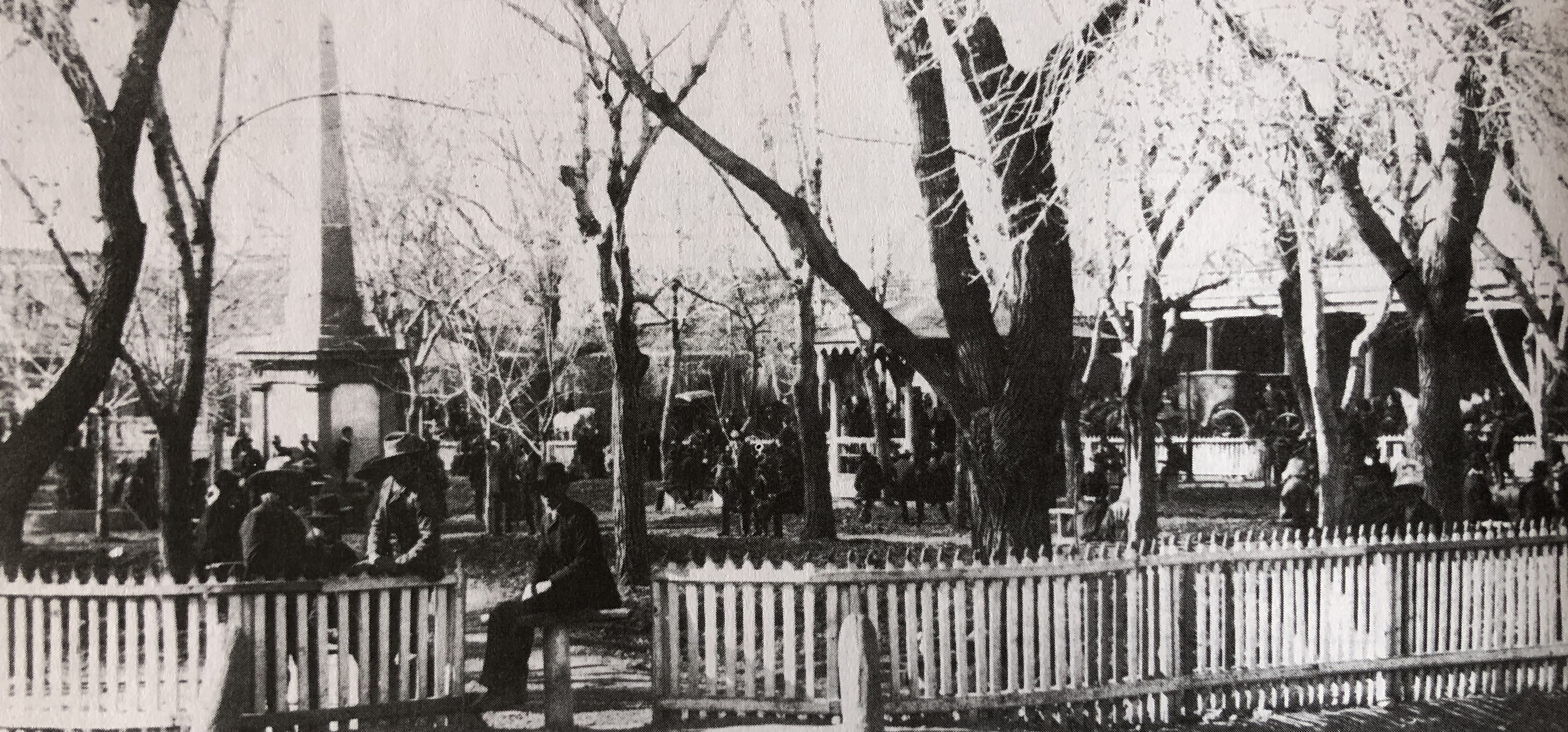
Santa Fe Plaza in 1885, photo by D.B. Chase

The Soldiers' Monument is a cenotaph at the center of the Santa Fe Plaza, a monument collectively memorializing deaths in several specified military battles. Erected in 1867 in the aftermath of the American Civil War, it consisted of a 33 feet (10 m) stone obelisk atop a plinth; only the plinth stands currently, and exhibits some damage. During the late nineteenth century, the monument was used as a place for Union veterans to gather at annual Memorial Day events to decorate the cenotaph and hear brief presentations.

The square plinth includes four inscribed panels, three of which dedicate the monument to unnamed Union Army soldiers who died on the battlefields of New Mexico Territory in the American Civil War. The fourth panel on the monument commemorates US soldiers who died "in the various battles with savage Indians", referring to the Army's then-ongoing campaigns comprising the American Indian Wars § West of the Mississippi (1804–1924).

The word "savage" was chiseled-off by an anonymous person in 1974. On October 12 (Indigenous People's Day) in 2020, the obelisk portion of the monument was toppled by protestors. After the subsequent erection of concrete-board walls around the remains by city government, the public was unable to access the monument and it was obscured from public view, a decision defended as a preservation measure. This state lasted for over four years until the resolution of a lawsuit concerning the fate of the memorial led to the removal of the covering in January 2025.

== Environs ==
The plaza and monument as depicted on two postcards from the 1930s:

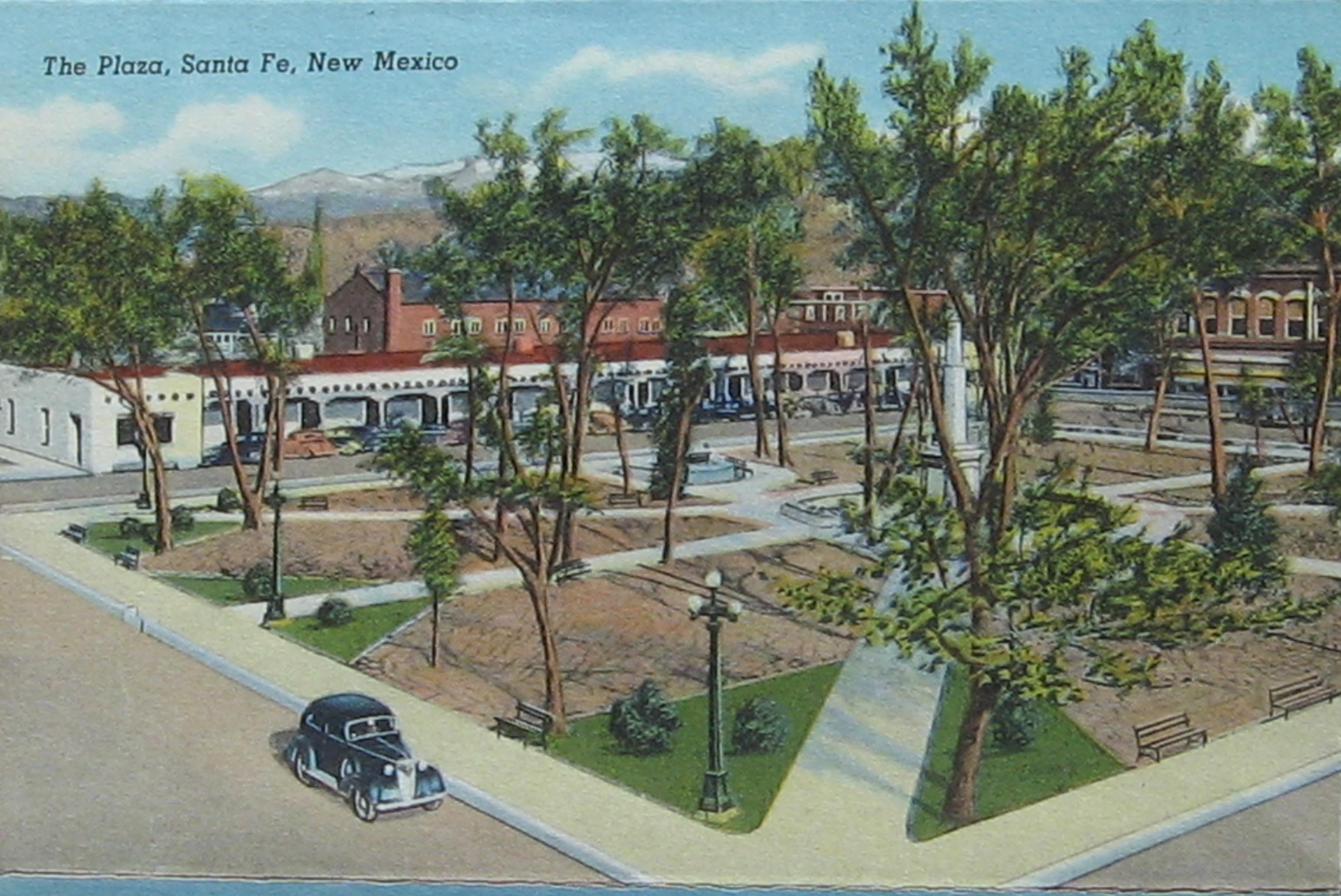
From an East San Francisco Street balcony;

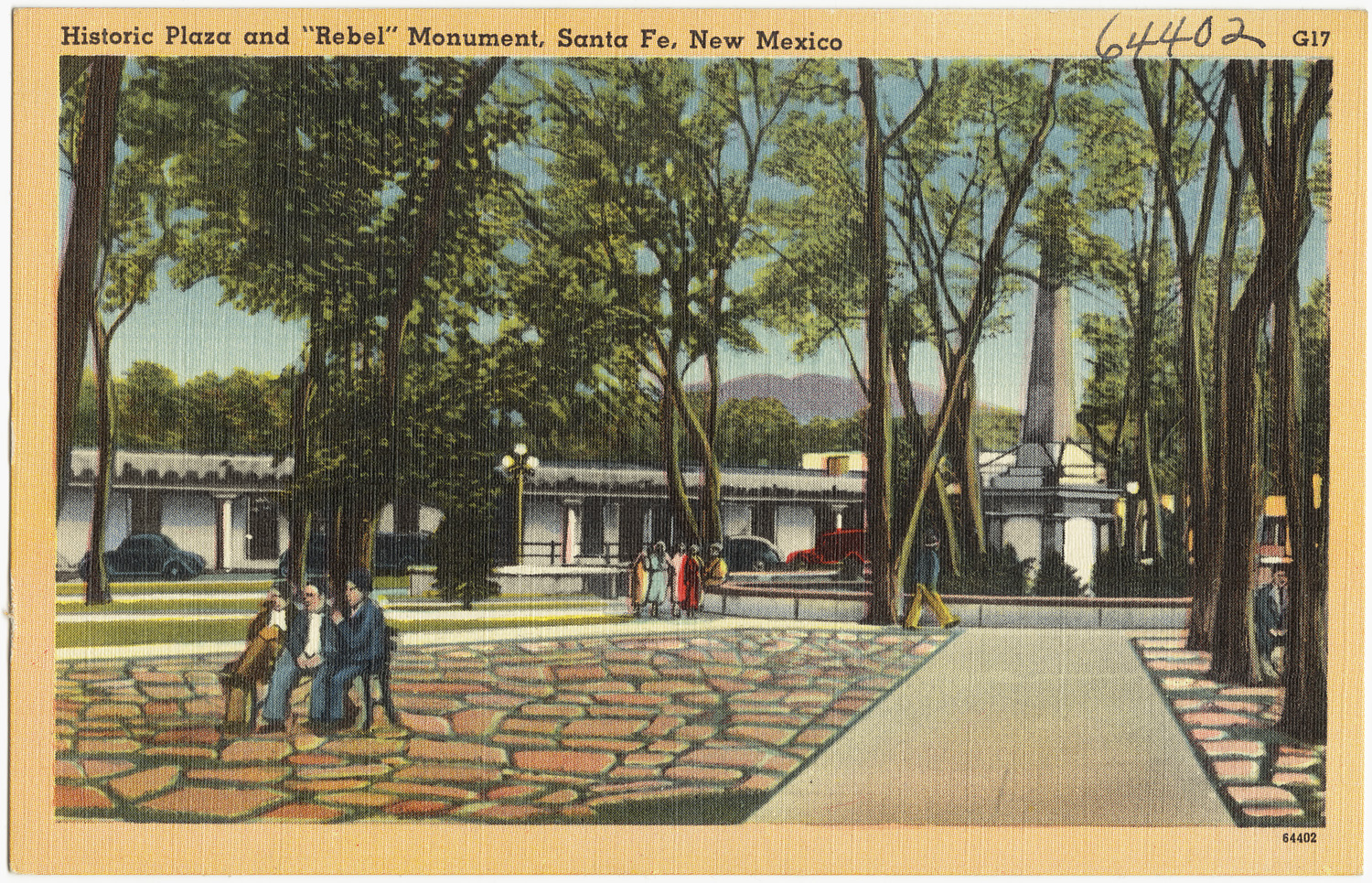
From the southwest pathway.

The Soldiers Monument is located in the center of the rectangular Santa Fe plaza. Its site is at the crux of eight walkways that radiate to the four corners and four sides and connect to a perimeter walkway.

The present siting originates with an 1860s re-design of the town square in a neoclassical style of the prior plaza grounds design. The plaza has native shade trees, grass, flower beds and replica Victorian iron benches and fences designed by John Gaw Meem in his 1967 plaza renovation plan. Stone banco seating border a flower bed at the monument.

== Structure ==
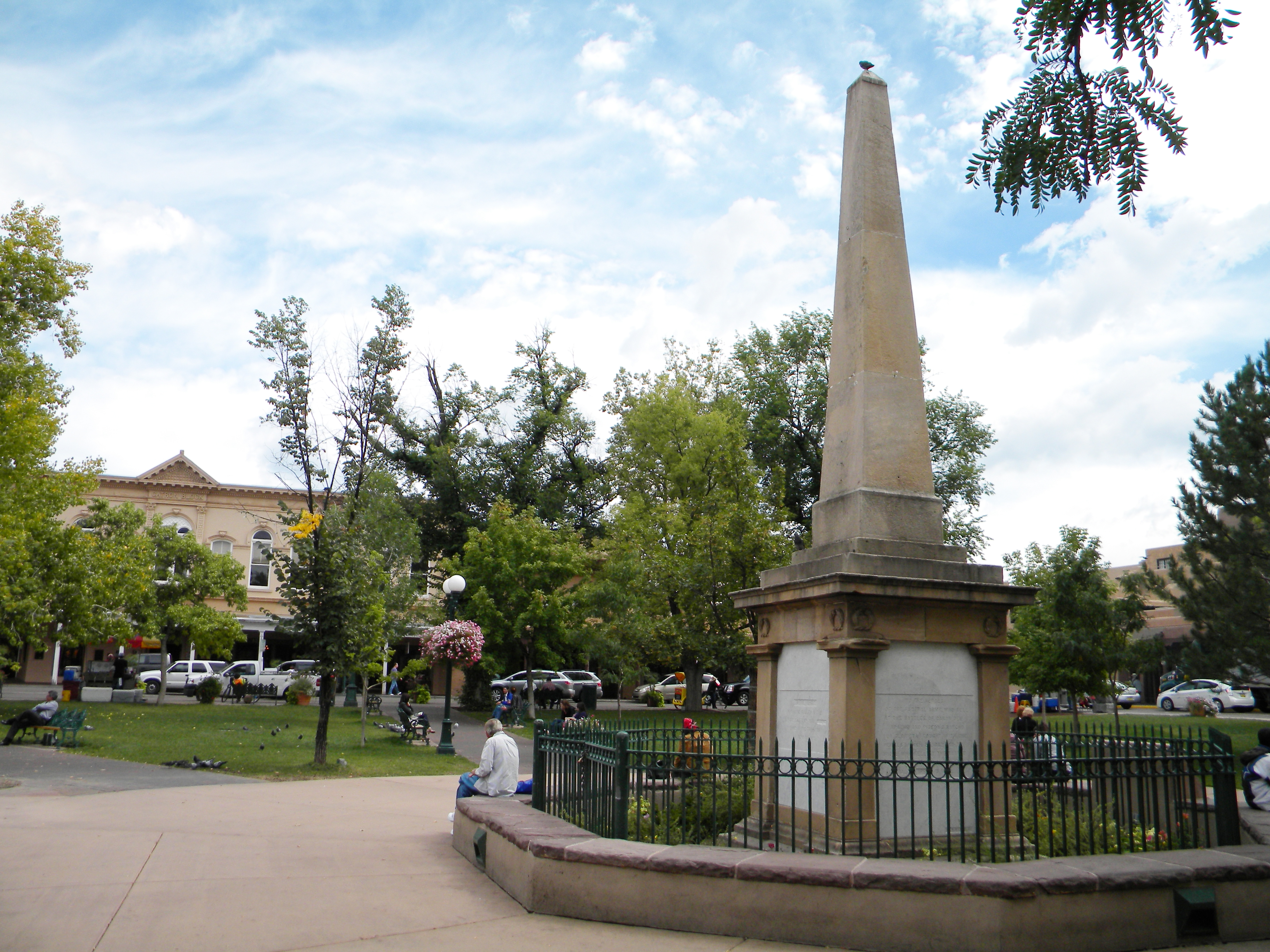
The monument in 2012, with chiseled section visible near base on left-facing side

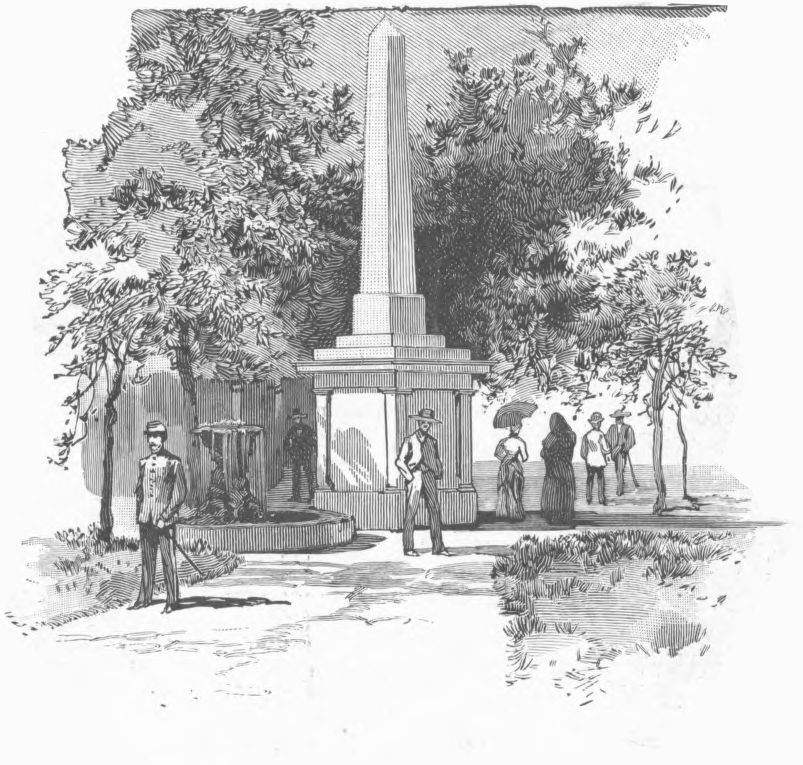
The monument in 1890

The monument consists of a stone obelisk with four engraved marble panels on the stone base commemorating U.S. soldiers who died in battles in New Mexico. It is located in the central area of the Santa Fe Plaza in downtown Santa Fe. The monument has a stone foundation; a locally produced brick and lime core plinth; local stone inscribed panels; imported Italian marble trim with marble columns and marble wreathes (Victorian funerary motifs), and marble obelisk. The cenotaph, with its Egyptian architectural associations, is 33-feet tall. Builders were McGee & Brother (John and Michael McGee), architects, master stone cutter Tomas Baca, and local craftsmen. The stone panels were inscribed by local craftsmen.

A time capsule was added October 24, 1867 containing coins of the period, local newspapers, legislative journals, and other commemorative items.

=== Plinth ===
==== Inscriptions ====
On January 29, 1868, the territorial legislature dictated the wording for the four stone panels to be inscribed on the monument. Inscribed on the four sides of the cardinal directions of the plinth:

East-facing Panel #1: ERECTED BY THE PEOPLE OF NEW MEXICO THROUGH THEIR LEGISLATURES OF 1866 – 7 – 8. MAY THE UNION BE PERPETUAL

South-facing Panel #2: TO THE HEROES OF THE FEDERAL ARMY WHO FELL AT THE BATTLE OF VALVERDE, FOUGHT WITH THE REBELS FEBUARY 21, 1862

West-facing Panel #3: TO THE HEROES OF THE FEDERAL ARMY WHO FELL AT THE BATTLES OF CANON DEL APACHE AND PIGEON'S RANCH (LA GLORIETA) FOUGHT WITH THE REBELS MARCH 28, 1862 AND TO THOSE WHO FELL AT THE BATTLE FOUGHT WITH THE REBELS AT PERALTA APRIL 15, 1862

North-facing Panel #4: TO THE HEROES WHO HAVE FALLEN IN THE VARIOUS BATTLES WITH SAVAGE INDIANS IN THE TERRITORY OF NEW MEXICO

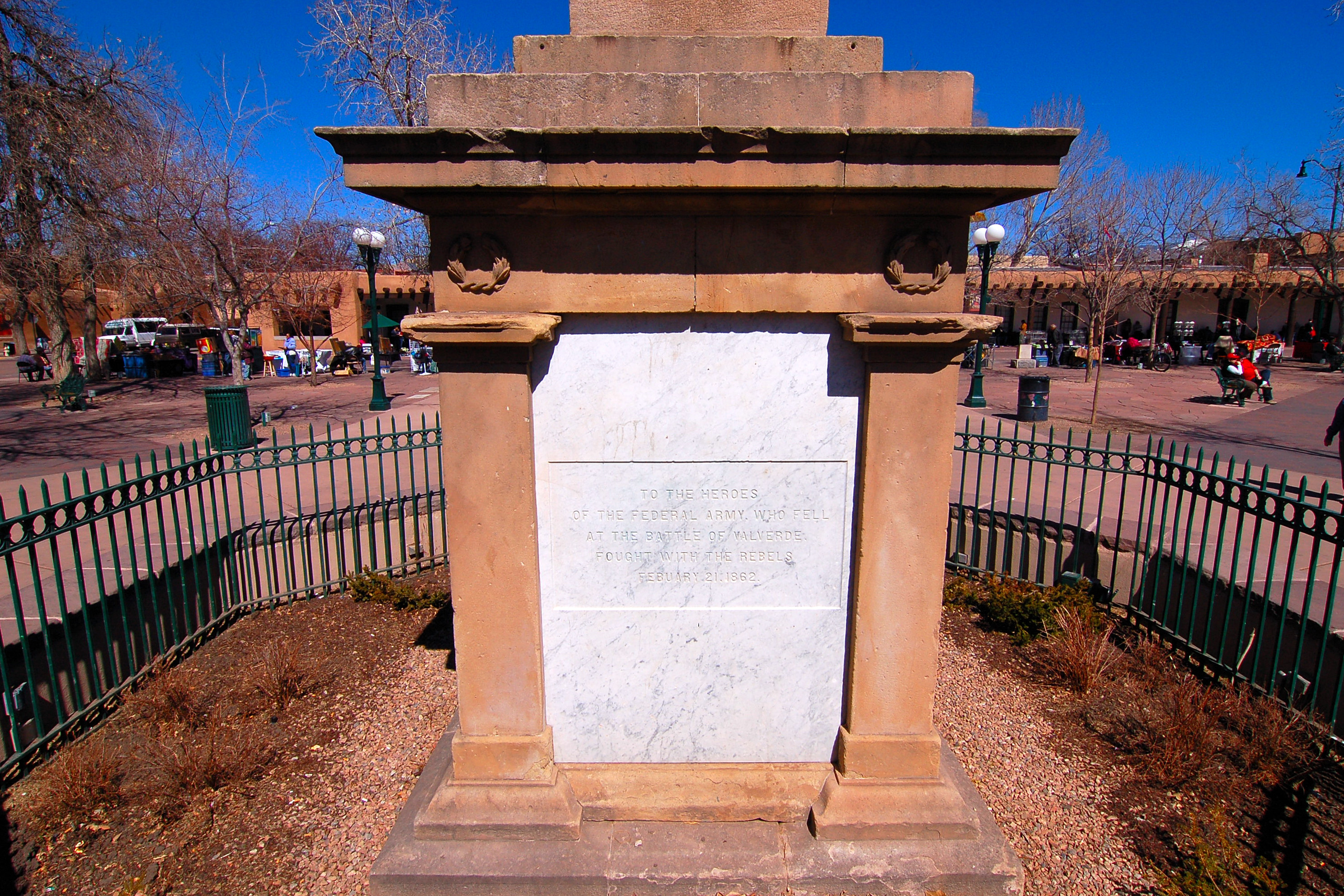
Soldiers' Monument South-facing panel#2 with 'February' misspelled as "Febuary"

The inscriptions contain minor errors. The word "April" was corrected but the word "February" was left misspelled without the first "r." In 1909, in response to complaints, legislators proposed replacing the word "Rebel" with "Confederate," but the measure failed to pass.

On August 8, 1974, the word "savage" was chiselled out of panel 4. In June 2020, the panel was further damaged. In October 2020, the panel 4 was broken out from the plinth. The panel that contained the words "savage Indians" faced towards the Palace of the Governors where local Puebloan artisans sell arts and crafts under the portico.

"The Battles of Cañon del Apache and Pigeon's Ranch" mentioned in panel 3 refers to events of the Civil War Battle of Glorieta Pass, "La Glorieta," March 26–28, 1862.

From the 1880s, use of the word "rebel" in panels 2 and 3 was considered by some, an insult to the South. In 1908–1909, the New Mexico governor offered to fund a change in wording while the legislative council passed a resolution supporting inscribing "confederate" in place of "rebel." In opposition, former governor L. Bradford Prince and veterans gained support for leaving the monument "sacred and unmutilated." Governor Prince saw the monument not only as a memorial but a symbol of an historic era, to be preserved in memory of the territory's loyalty to the Union. The monument was left unchanged. In 1925 and in the 1930s, other efforts by Texans to have the monument removed because of the word 'rebel' failed to gain support.

=== Obelisk ===
The obelisk was of standard design from Edgar Warne & Company marble works, St. Louis, the contractor for the monument material. In the spring of 1868, the five marble components of the obelisk – four tapered shaft segments and a pyramidal capstone – were placed atop the plinth's tiered stone cap. Construction was completed in June 1868. In 2020, city workers removed the capstone while examining the monument's structural stability for relocation plans.

=== Brass plaque ===
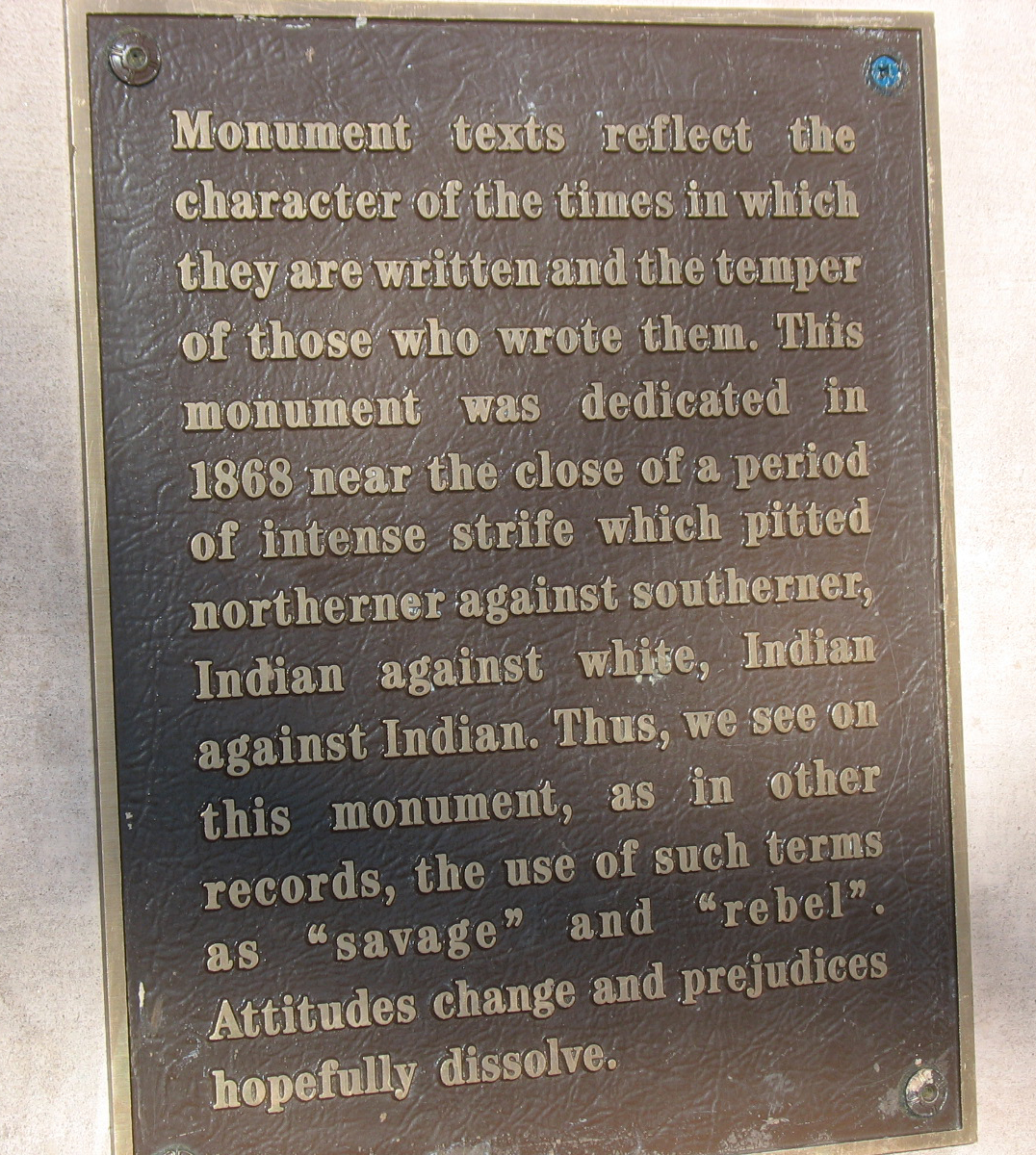

On the south side of the monument, a concrete stand with interpretive brass plaque prepared in 1973 by the State Cultural Properties Review Committee explains the context for monument wording:

"Monument texts reflect the character of the times in which they are written and the temper of those who wrote them. This monument was dedicated in 1868 near the close of a period of intense strife which pitted northerner against southerner, Indian against white, Indian against Indian. Thus, we see on this monument, as in other records, the use of such terms as 'savage' and 'rebel'. Attitudes change and prejudices hopefully dissolve."

== Installation ==
Like other similarly named monuments, it was erected in the aftermath of the American Civil War. The inscription on the brass interpretive plaque makes reference to the New Mexico Territorial Legislature, precursor to the post-statehood New Mexico Legislature, as being instrumental in the planning of the monument. In 1866, after complaints that Union graves were being robbed in New Mexico's Civil War battlefields, the 1866–1867 territorial legislature passed an act to fund the care of Union soldiers' graves and to build a monument to memorialize dead Union soldiers from New Mexico.

The monuments committee was chaired by Judge John P. Slough, former Union commander at the Battle of Glorieta Pass. The committee selected the site, hired architects and workers, and contracted with a marble works for a cenotaph of modest design. At the October 24, 1867, cornerstone laying, Slough inserted a time capsule into the cornerstone. Discord and partisan politics of the time interfered with the construction; Slough was killed in December 1867 in Santa Fe by a political rival.

A new committee was formed to revise the intent of the under-construction monument. The next legislature, 1867–1868, passed an act January 29, 1868 that stated: "Whereas no provision has been made for honoring the brave victims who have perished in the various wars with the savage Indians surrounding us, and this Legislative Assembly desires that a slab perpetuating the memory of those be included." The fourth panel text was revised. In March workers cut slabs from a local stone quarry and inscribed the text dictated in the 1868 act. On May 30, 1868, the first nation-wide Memorial Day, a ceremony dedicated the nearly-completed Soldiers Monument (it was completed with the placing of the capstone a few days later in June 1868).

=== Proposed modifications ===
During the 1910s–1960s, efforts emerged to remove the monument and replace it with either a gazebo or with a statue of a Spanish colonizer, Don Diego de Vargas. Local Hispanic groups offered to remove the obelisk and install a de Vargas statue on the plinth.

During the 1950s, Oliver La Farge and other preservationists opposed the removal of the obelisk, supported a city architectural preservation ordinance for the downtown's historic core and the nomination of the plaza (including the Soldiers Monument) as a National Historic Landmark. A proposal to replace the monument with a festive gazebo was also opposed by preservationists.

== Public responses and actions ==
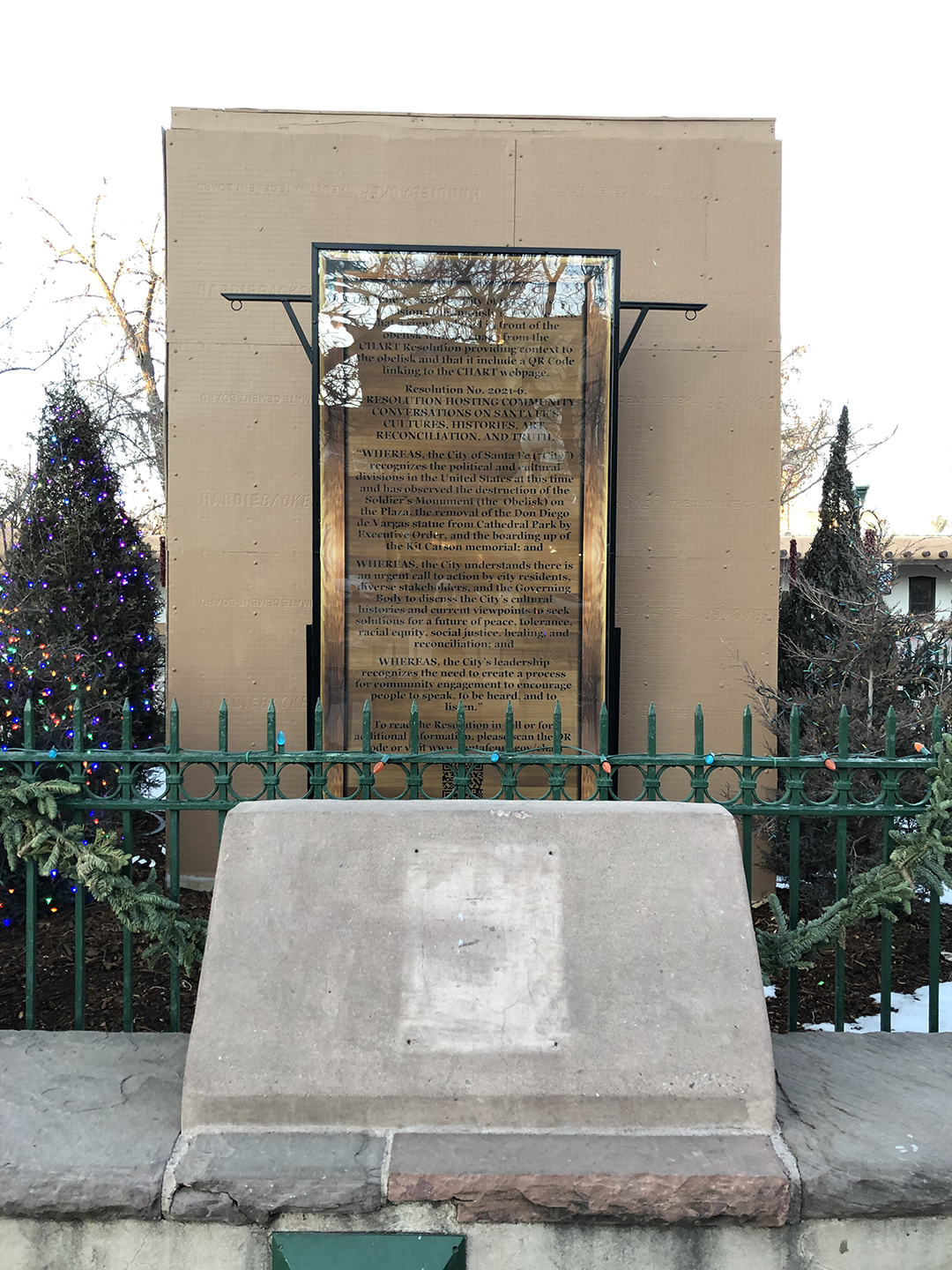
Santa Fe Soldier's Monument, temporary plaque (previous plaque removed), 2022

The monument has been described as racist due to the derogatory references to indigenous people in the area then known as New Mexico Territory and now known as New Mexico. There were complaints during the 1950s to remove or replace it, that continued for decades. During the 1960s, too, the words 'savage Indians' became the focus of criticism. In his 1960 column, Oliver La Farge had noted the wording, stating that the words 'savage Indians' meant Navajo and Mescalero Apache and the "rebels" meant these Native elements and Confederate soldiers from Texas.

In 1961 an elder of Tesuque Pueblo stated that his first realization he was a second-class citizen was when he read the words 'savage Indian' on the panel as a child. He added, the word should be changed: "why should future generations of American Indian children continue to have this insulting reminder that the conquerors considered them little more than blood-lusting beasts, not notable martyrs fighting for their homes?"

By the end of the decade Native and non-native people were increasingly discontent about such symbols of conquest as the monument. In 1973, the American Indian Movement leadership wrote the governor of New Mexico to change the wording of panel 4 or remove the Soldiers Monument. The governor asked the city, which first passed a motion to remove it, then faced local opposition by old families and preservationists. Because of an earlier federal grant the state had also agreed to preserve the monument for a set period. The city reversed its decision. The state government proposed a plaque be added to explain the context of the words "Rebel" and "Savage Indians". Native organizations were advised, with agreement at the official state level, but concerns remained that the plaque was not enough.

The GI Forum in Taos sent a message to the governor stating that the panel 4 wording was disturbing and should be obliterated: "no explanation in favor of the phrase can be sufficiently convincing." After meeting with Pueblo elders, the state revised the text again. By the end of 1973, the growing controversy superficially appeared resolved.

In 2000, Wanda Ross Padilla (then president of the Santa Fe chapter of the NAACP) spoke out about the derogatory wording. City management was hesitant to make changes because the plaza received federal aid as a National Historic Landmark in the 1960s and 1970s.

By June 2020, the Three Sisters Collective, a Santa Fe organization, whose "vision is to reclaim and celebrate Pueblo Indigenous identity and culture through the arts and activism," wrote on social media "This racist monument against indigenous peoples has got to go."

Local indigenous activists had planned a peaceful protest to support the removal of the monument. Shortly thereafter, Mayor Alan Webber stated that he planned to have the monument removed in addition to two others that symbolized glorification of conquest and violence. After the mayor's announcement, protest organizers announced that instead of the planned protest a celebration would be held to mark the city's intent to remove the monument. A diverse crowd of several hundred people gathered at the plaza for two hours of talks focusing on reconciliation, social justice and a new era of civil rights. The crowd was made up of Native Americans, Anglos, Hispanic and African Americans of all age ranges. The celebration was organized by Jade Begay of NDN Collective, along with The Red Nation and the Three Sisters Collective. The plaza rally was peaceful and free of conflict, although two attendees marked the obelisk with red handprints. Less than one day before, the monument had been damaged by a state-contracted crew in an unsuccessful attempt to remove it. However the tip of the obelisk was removed by crane due to safety concerns.

=== Chiseling ===
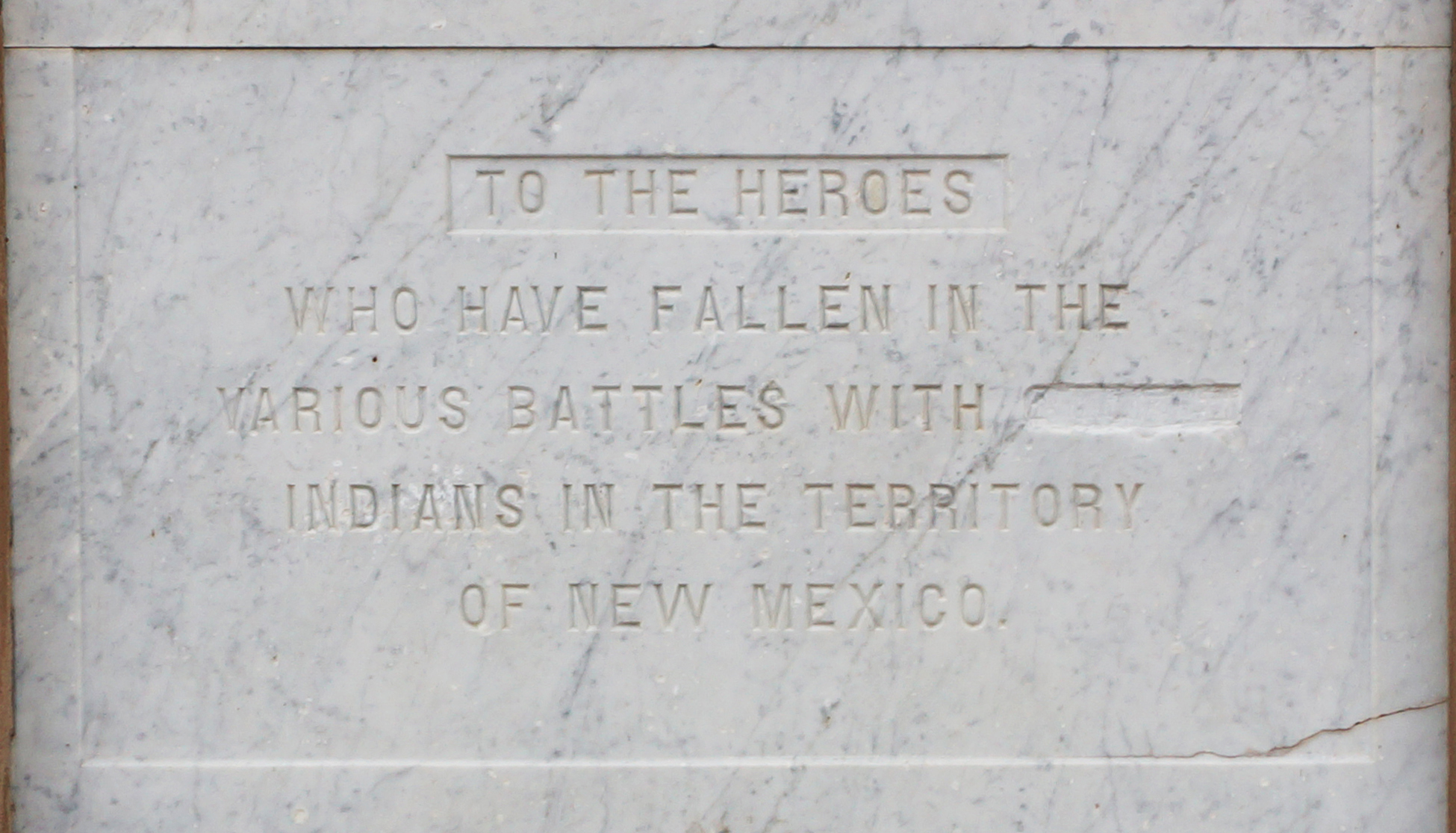
Detail of plaque engraving with the word 'savage' chiseled off

On August 8, 1974, the word "savage" was chiseled off. Del Lovato, the chairman of the All-Indian Pueblo Council (now the All Pueblo Council of Governors), stated "I'm happy it's off [the word 'savage'] and I hope it stays off, period." It was reported that a young man wearing a hard hat walked into the plaza and chiseled out the word "savage" from the monument. His identity has never been confirmed, although a woman claims it was her father. The Santa Fe New Mexican newspaper reported that the man was described as being "in his 20s and having long blond hair" worn in a pony tail. A witness stated that no one questioned the man because he "looked official." At the time of the incident, the state historian, Dr. Myra Ellen Jenkins, said her "immediate reaction was that I doubt it was an Indian [who performed the chiseling] but some Anglo kook." She went on to add that "Vandalism is not an Indian characteristic. Protest, yes; vandalism, no."

The reference to Native Americans as 'savages' in panel text #4 had long been a sore point to Native community groups who felt that the entire monument was an affront to their people because it "paid homage to Union soldiers who helped cement a claim to the territory for a nation that believed its [manifest] destiny stretched westward."

Subsequently, various unauthorized alterations have been made to the obelisk, including the marking of "courageous" in 2014 over the area where "savage" had been previously chiseled, and in 2020 further blunt damage to the side of the obelisk previously chiseled along with spray-painting over other parts.

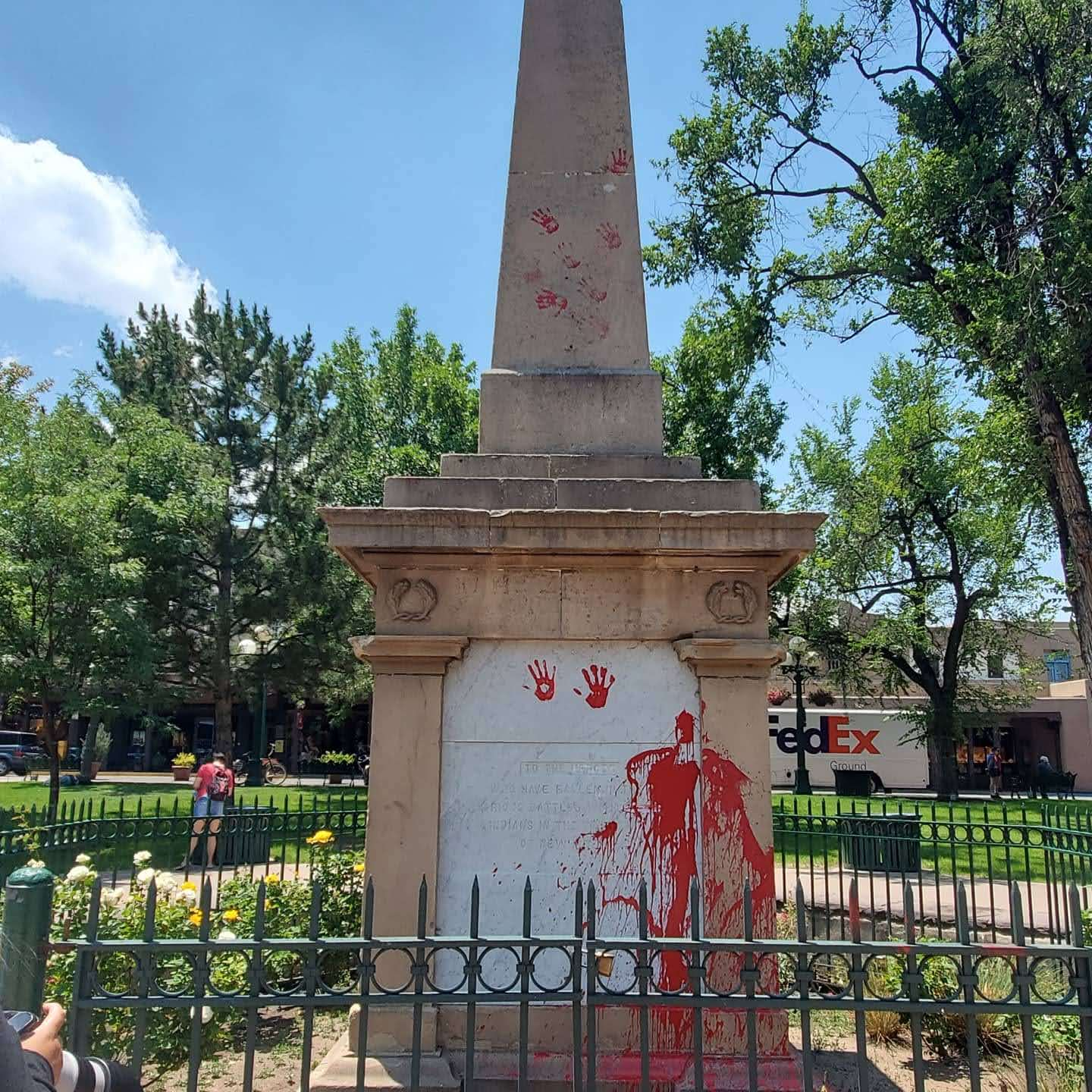
Red handprints marked on the monument in June 2020

=== Brass plaque removal ===
The brass interpretive plaque was removed in 2020.

=== Toppling ===
In mid-2020, there were a series of protests on the plaza and some of the protestors left red handprints on the monument. On October 12, 2020, protesters who had been at the plaza for the previous weekend toppled the top three components of the obelisk using ropes. Some arrests were made prior to the toppling, although it is not clear if they resulted in immediate bookings; some injuries were reported.

In anticipation of protests on the Plaza, city workers had gathered plywood to board off the obelisk; however, it was not assembled before the toppling occurred.

The following Sunday, the Santa Fe New Mexican published the weekly combined op-ed/letters to the editor/editorial page section solely on the toppling of the obelisk; various New Mexicans opined, including cartoonist Ricardo Caté and the author Hampton Sides.

=== Additional 2020s developments ===
In February 2021, another person was arrested and charged with criminal damage to property. In June 2021, a man was arrested after climbing a box covering the pedestal and damaging part of it. Also that June, a local fraternal order, the Union Protectíva de Santa Fé, filed a lawsuit against the Santa Fe city government after the city announced plans to remove it permanently. As of 2022, eight people had been charged for destroying the obelisk, and all but one has participated in community/restorative justice programs in exchange for charges being dropped. Testimony in a civil lawsuit over the obelisk's removal began in September 2024. In October, the city council and mayor formed a committee to investigate the feasibility of removing the offensive plaque and moving the monument to Santa Fe National Cemetery. The United States Veterans Administration declined to accept the monument in 2026, citing restoration costs. In December 2024, a judge ordered the Santa Fe government to remove the plywood around the obelisk within 30 days and to either restore the obelisk to its pre-2020 condition within 180 days or take no further action which does not comply with the New Mexico Prehistoric and Historic Sites Preservation Act.

If the obelisk were not restored, the Santa Fe government was required to instead initiate a historic review process. The plywood box surrounding the base was removed on January 14, 2025 and the paint on the monument stripped using a solvent designed for such purposes called Elephant Snot. Multiple candidates in the 2025 Santa Fe mayoral election have taken a stance on the city's next actions regarding the partial monument.

== See also ==
- Lists of war monuments and memorials
- Indigenous Peoples' Day as a response to Columbus Day

== External media ==
External videos
- The toppling videographed by then Albuquerque Journal reporter Joni Auden Land, archived Twitter video
- The toppling videographed as part of KOAT 7 reportage, YouTube video
