= Rosalie Fish =

Native American athlete and activist

Rosalie Fish is a Native American runner, member of the Cowlitz Tribe, former student athlete at Iowa Central Community College and the University of Washington. As a senior at Muckleshoot Tribal School, Fish made international headlines when she painted a red handprint over her mouth, the fingers extending across her cheeks to honor the lives of missing and murdered indigenous women. Rosalie Fish has also been a featured speaker for Tedx Talks.

== Murdered and Missing Indigenous Women (MMIW) ==
Fish dedicated her performance at the 2019 Washington State 1B track and field championships track meet to murdered and missing indigenous women (MMIW). At the meet, Fish wore a painted red handprint over her mouth; as well, the letters MMIW written on her leg. Fish was inspired by Jordan Marie Daniel, a citizen of the Kul Wicasa Oyate/Lower Brule Reservation in South Dakota. Daniel first wore a hand print across her face during the Boston Marathon in April 2019.

== Championships ==
Rosalie Fish won 2 National Junior College Athletic Association championship titles and earned 11-All-American awards as a college distance runner. Fish helped her team win 2023 Pac-12 Conference Cross Country Championships, 3rd place at the 2021 NJCAA Division I Outdoor Track & Field Championships, win 2020 NJCAA Region XI Championships, place 2nd at the 2020 NJCAA Indoor Track & Field Championships, and win 2019 NJCAA Division I Cross Country Championships.

Year	Competition	Venue	Position	Event	Notes
Representing Washington Huskies NCAA Division I
2023	Pac-12 Conference Cross Country Championships	Seattle, Washington	48th	6 km	20:45.7
National Junior College Athletic Association
Representing Iowa Central Community College
2021	NJCAA Division I Outdoor Track & Field Championships	Levelland, Texas	3rd	1500 m	4:46.53
2021	NJCAA Division I Outdoor Track & Field Championships	Levelland, Texas	3rd	5 km	18:24.92
2021	NJCAA Division I Outdoor Track & Field Championships	Levelland, Texas	4th	4x800 m	9:55.93
2021	NJCAA Division I Indoor Track & Field Championships	Pittsburg, Kansas	3rd	1000 m	3:02.83
2021	NJCAA Division I Indoor Track & Field Championships	Pittsburg, Kansas	5th	1609 m	5:09.74
2021	NJCAA Division I Indoor Track & Field Championships	Pittsburg, Kansas	1st	Distance medley relay	12:06.58
2020	NJCAA Region XI Cross Country Championships	Fort Dodge, Iowa	3rd	5 km	18:47.6
2020	NJCAA Division I Indoor Track & Field Championships	Lynchburg, Virginia	7th	1000 m	3:09.10
2020	NJCAA Division I Indoor Track & Field Championships	Lynchburg, Virginia	7th	5 km	18:06.03
2020	NJCAA Division I Indoor Track & Field Championships	Lynchburg, Virginia	1st	4x800 m	9:37.81
2019	NJCAA Division I Cross Country Championships	Albuquerque, New Mexico	35th	5 km	19:39.7

=== Washington State 1B Track and Field Results ===
Fish placed first in the 800m, 1600m, and 3200m races at the 2019 state championship.

== Personal life ==
Fish is queer and Two-spirit.
