= Jordan Marie Daniel =

Native American runner and activist (born 1988)

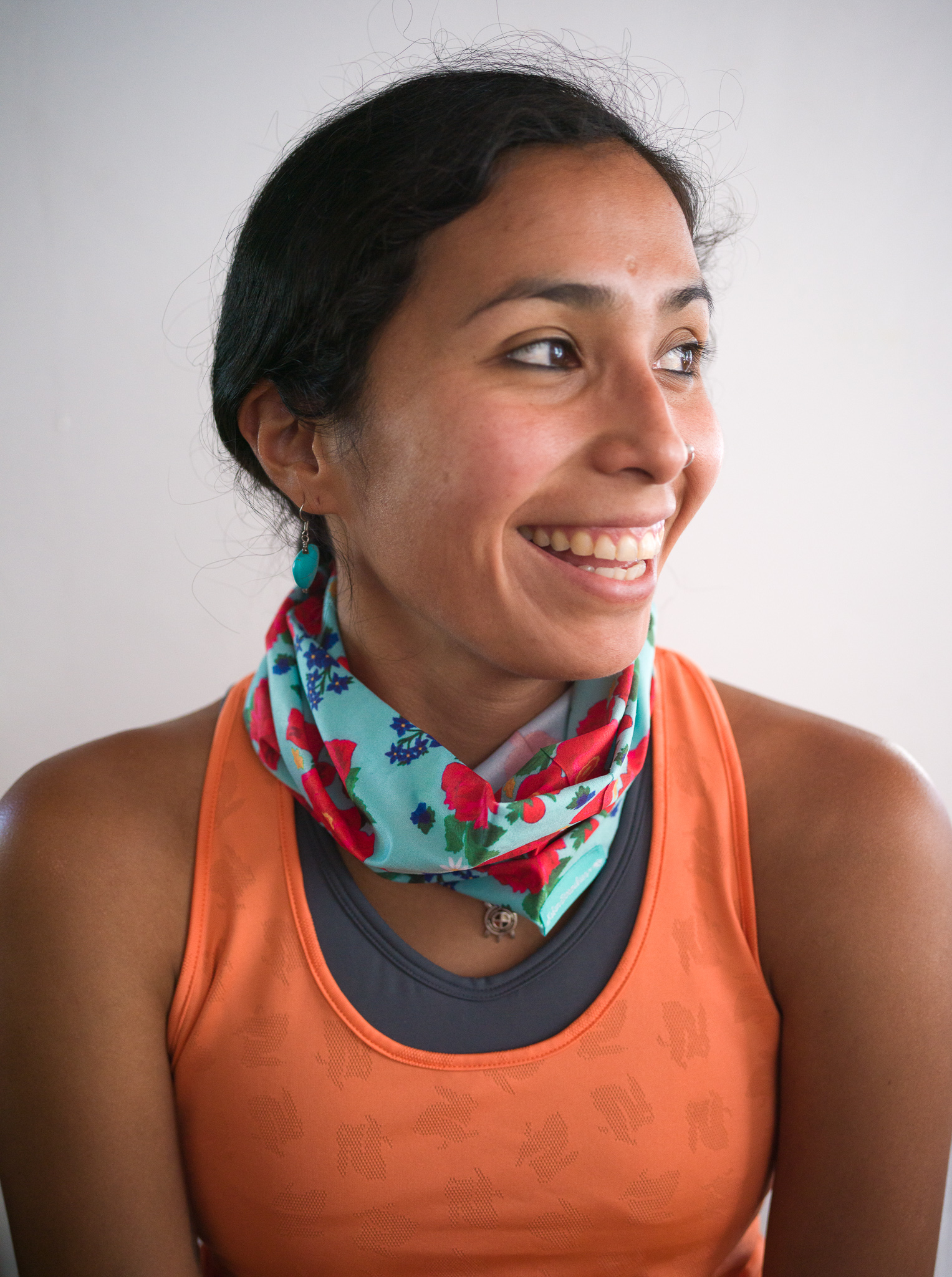
- Daniel in 2021
- Born: 1988 (age 37–38); Lower Brule, South Dakota
- Citizenship: Lower Brule Sioux Tribe • American
- Occupations: documentary film producer/director, Indigenous activities
- Known for: Indigenous activism through running
- Notable work: Run to Be Visible (Documentary Film)

Jordan Marie Brings Three White Horses Daniel (born 1988) is a fourth-generation runner, documentary film producer/director and Indigenous activist who uses running as a platform to honor and raise awareness of Missing and Murdered Indigenous Women (MMIW). Daniel participated in the 2019 Boston Marathon with Wings of America and dedicated their run to the cause of Missing and murdered Indigenous Women. In 2021, Daniel was featured in the book, Notable Native People: 50 Indigenous Leaders, Dreamers and Changemakers from Past and Present by Adrienne Keene.

== Biography ==
Daniel was born in 1988 in Lower Brule, South Dakota, and is a citizen of the Lower Brule Sioux Tribe (Kul Wicasa Oyate). Their mother is Terra Beth Brings Three White Horses Daniel. At age nine they moved to rural Maine where their father accepted a teaching position (psychology professor) at the University of Maine at Farmington. During their time in rural Maine, they experienced racially related hate-crime, discrimination and microaggressions. Daniel has described how these experiences influenced their struggle with identity. Daniel participated in the Maine National Education for Women Leadership Program (University of Maine, Margaret Chase Smith Policy Center) in 2010 and graduated from the University of Maine in 2011. Daniel's mother and grandfather, Nyal Brings Three White Horses, were well-known runners and Daniel's grandfather took them on their first run. After graduation, Daniel held positions at the National Indian Health Board, the Administration for Native Americans and interned with U.S. Representative Chellie Pingree.

== Recognition ==
In 2021, Daniel was featured in the book, Notable Native People: 50 Indigenous Leaders, Dreamers and Changemakers from Past and Present by Adrienne Keene. Daniel is the founder of Rising Hearts, a grassroots community organizing collective focusing on issues related to Indigenous rights. Two Rising Hearts programs (Running with Purpose and Running on Native Land) combine running and activism. In 2020, Daniel organized a virtual 5K event, "Running for the Health of All Nations," a fundraiser to benefit Indigenous communities.

In 2019, Daniel was contacted by a Washington high school runner, Rosalie Fish (Cowlitz) on Instagram. Fish sought permission and support to dedicate her own efforts at the State Track and Field Championship to Missing and murdered Indigenous Women and to paint a red handprint over her face and mouth.

== See also ==
- Missing and murdered Indigenous women
- Lakota people
