= Dana B. Chase =

New Mexican photographer

Dana B. Chase (1848–1897) was a 19th-century American photographer. Chase was born in Maine and ran two photography studios in Colorado from 1873 to the 1880s. He is also known as D.B. Chase.

After primarily running his practice in Trinidad, Colorado, he moved one of his studios to the Santa Fe plaza, in New Mexico territory. The work space Chase occupied in Santa Fe had previously been the studio of the photographer William Henry Brown.

== Personal life ==
Chase had four children with his first wife, Ella. He divorced Ella and married his second wife, Belle, in 1888. He and Belle divorced in 1897. In 1892, he sold his gallery in Santa Fe to Thomas J. Curran, a photographer. Chase died in 1897.

His second wife, Belle Bybee Chase was also a photographer who was known for her boudoir photographs. She continued to use her former husband's Denver studio after his death until about 1902. She is recorded to have worked as a photographer between 1917 and 1920 in Los Angeles.

== Collections ==
Photographs by Chase are included in the permanent collections of the Getty Museum, the Amon Carter Museum, the Autry Museum of the American West, the Harwood Museum of Art, among others. The New Mexico History Museum Palace of the Governors photo archives holds 230 of his photographic prints including images of the town of Santa Fe during the territorial period, the Puebloan people and other New Mexico scenes. The photographs were taken between 1884 - 1892.

== Gallery ==
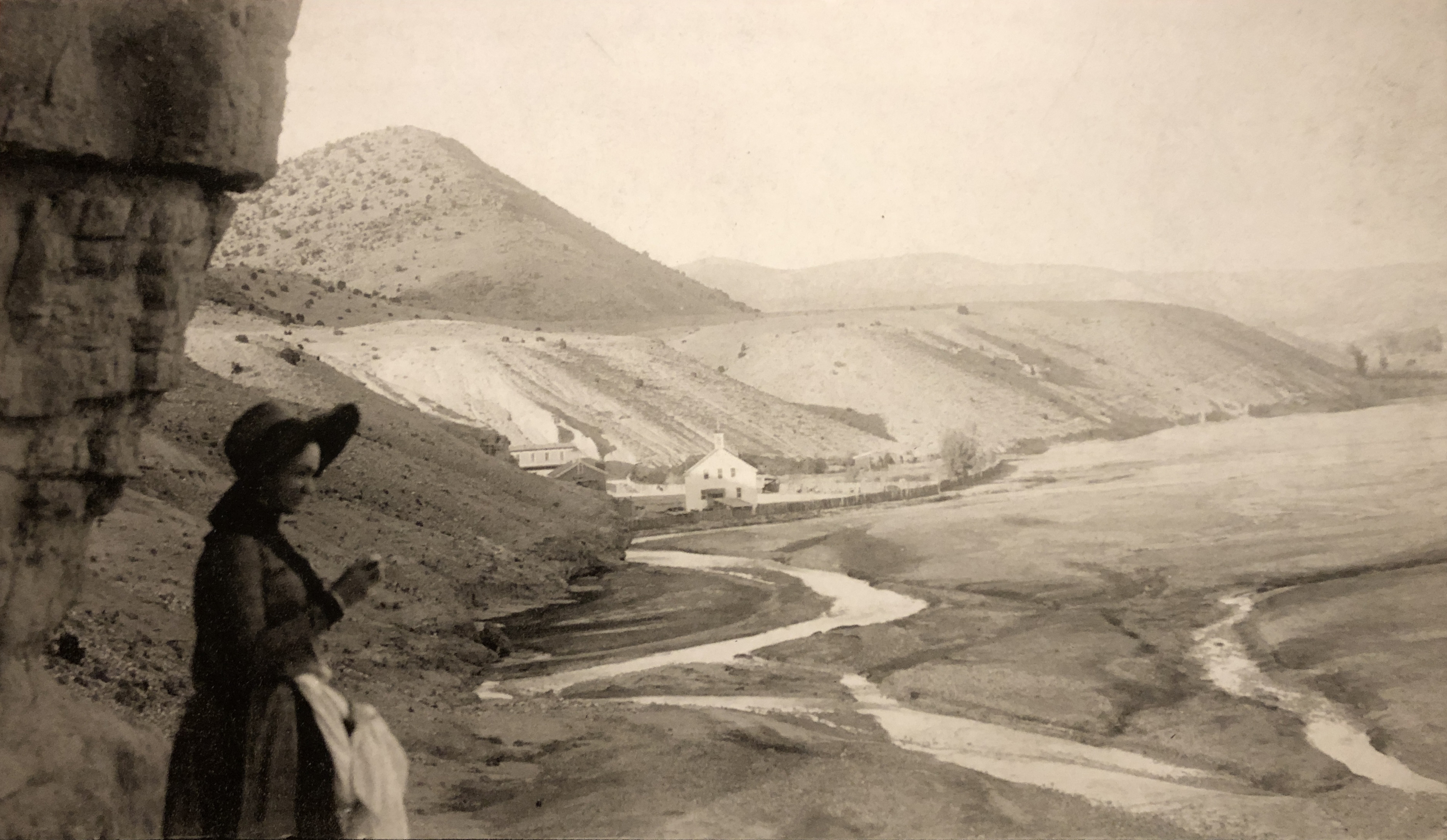
Looking up Caliente Rio at the Ojo Caliente Hot Springs

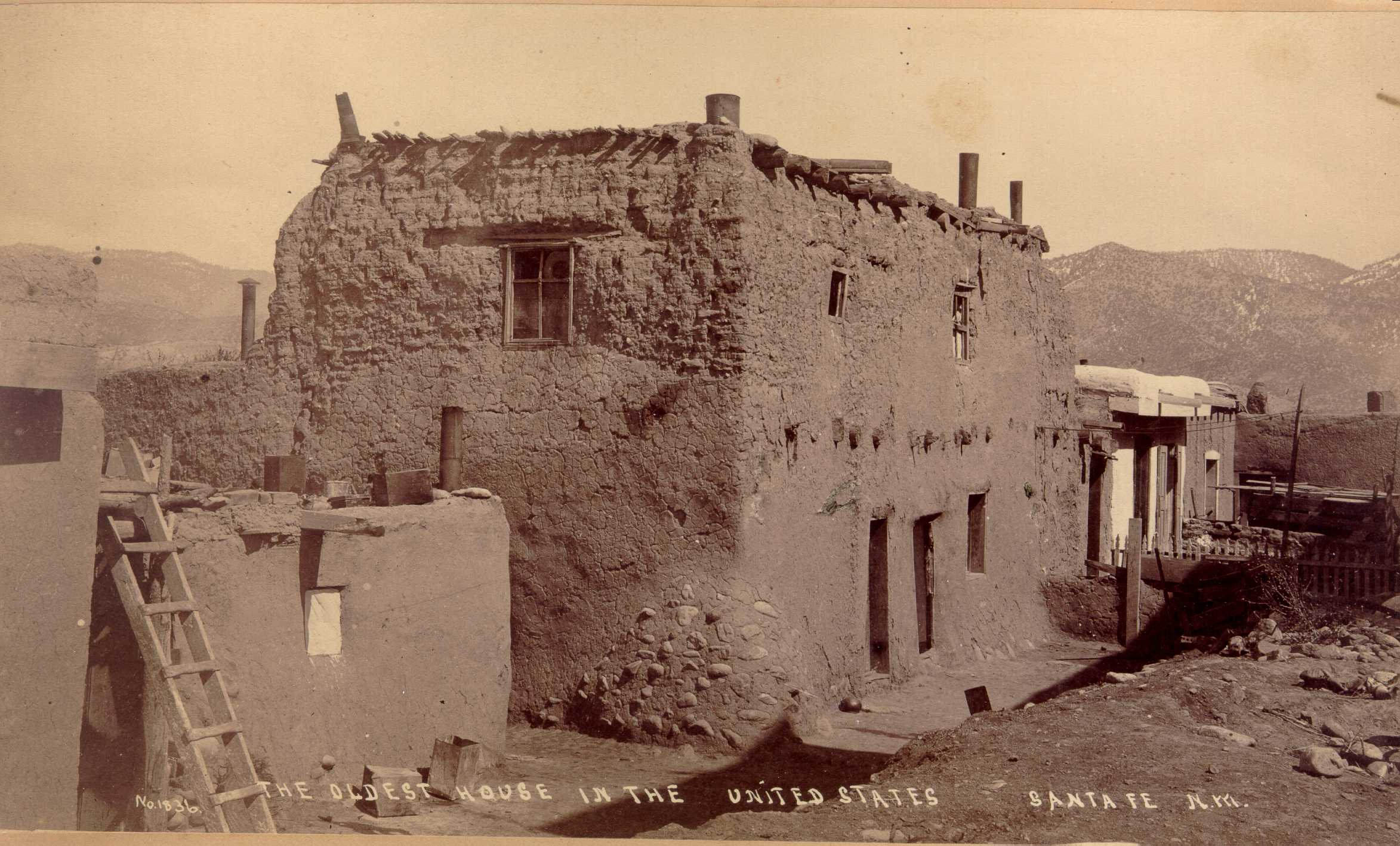
Oldest House in Santa Fe, New Mexico, c.1885

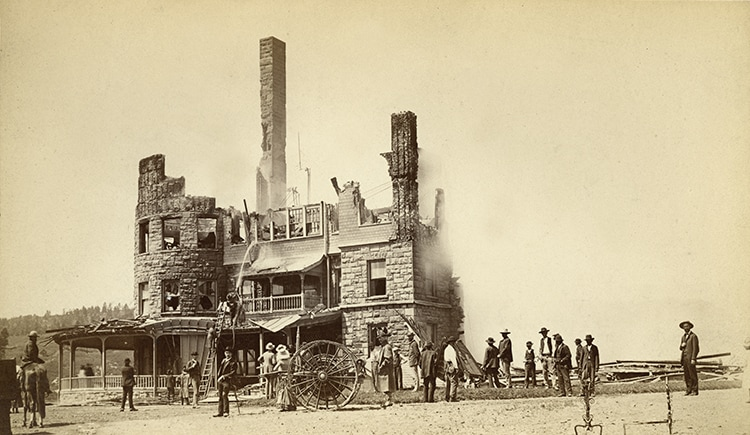
Montezuma Hotel after the August 8, 1885 Fire, Las Vegas Hot Springs, New Mexico,1885

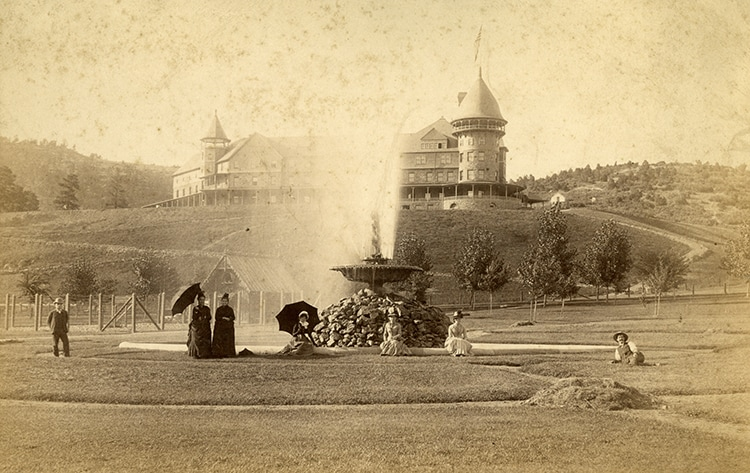
Dana B. Chase. Montezuma Hotel (rebuilt), Las Vegas Hot Springs, New Mexico, 1888

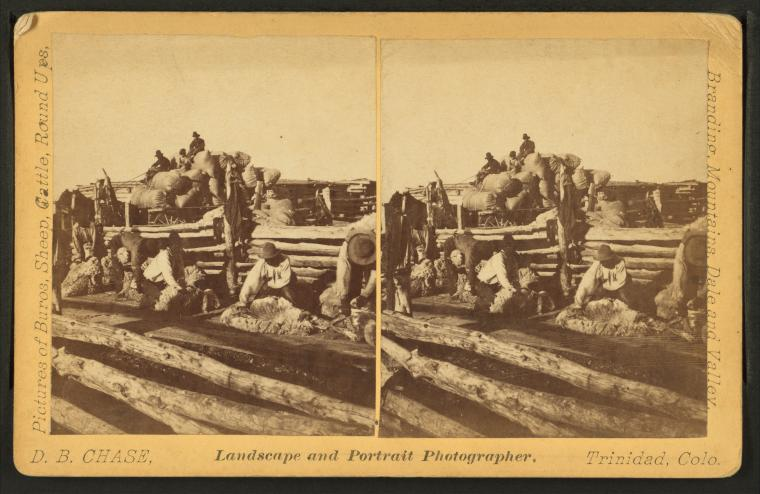
Shearing sheep
