= Santa Fe Plaza =

National Historic Landmark in downtown Santa Fe, New Mexico

- U.S. National Register of Historic Places
- U.S. National Historic Landmark
- U.S. Historic district – Contributing property
- NM State Register of Cultural Properties
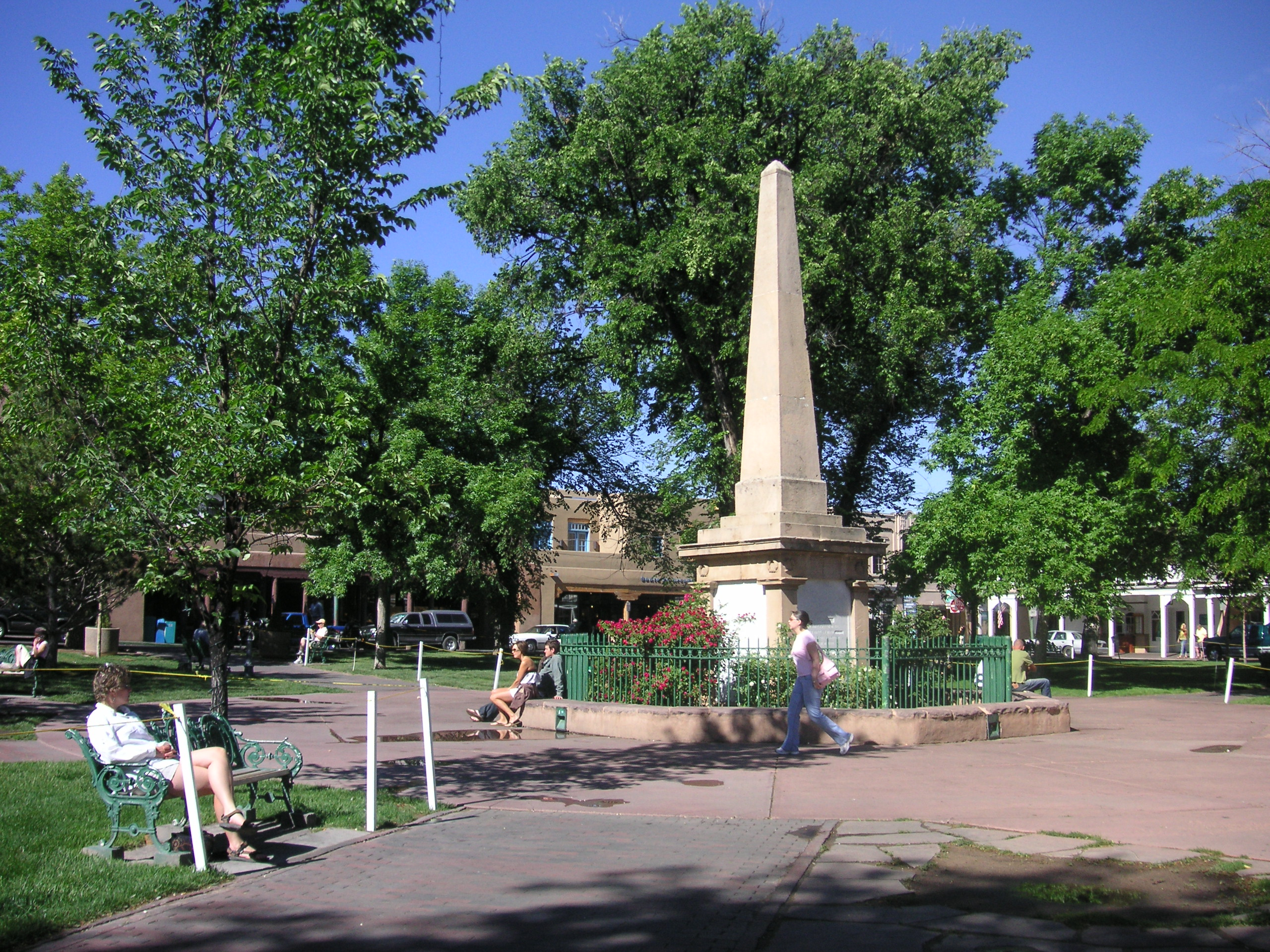
- Santa Fe Plaza in 2006, before the obelisk part of Soldiers' Monument was toppled in 2020

- Location within New Mexico Location within the United States
- Interactive map showing the location of Santa Fe Plaza
- Location: Santa Fe Plaza, Santa Fe, New Mexico
- Coordinates: 35°41′14.7474″N 105°56′18.6714″W
- Area: 2 acres (0.81 ha)
- Built: 1821
- Part of: Santa Fe Historic District (ID73001150)
- NRHP reference No.: 66000491
- NMSRCP No.: 260

Significant dates
- Added to NRHP: October 15, 1966
- Designated NHL: December 19, 1960
- Designated CP: July 23, 1973
- Designated NMSRCP: September 29, 1972

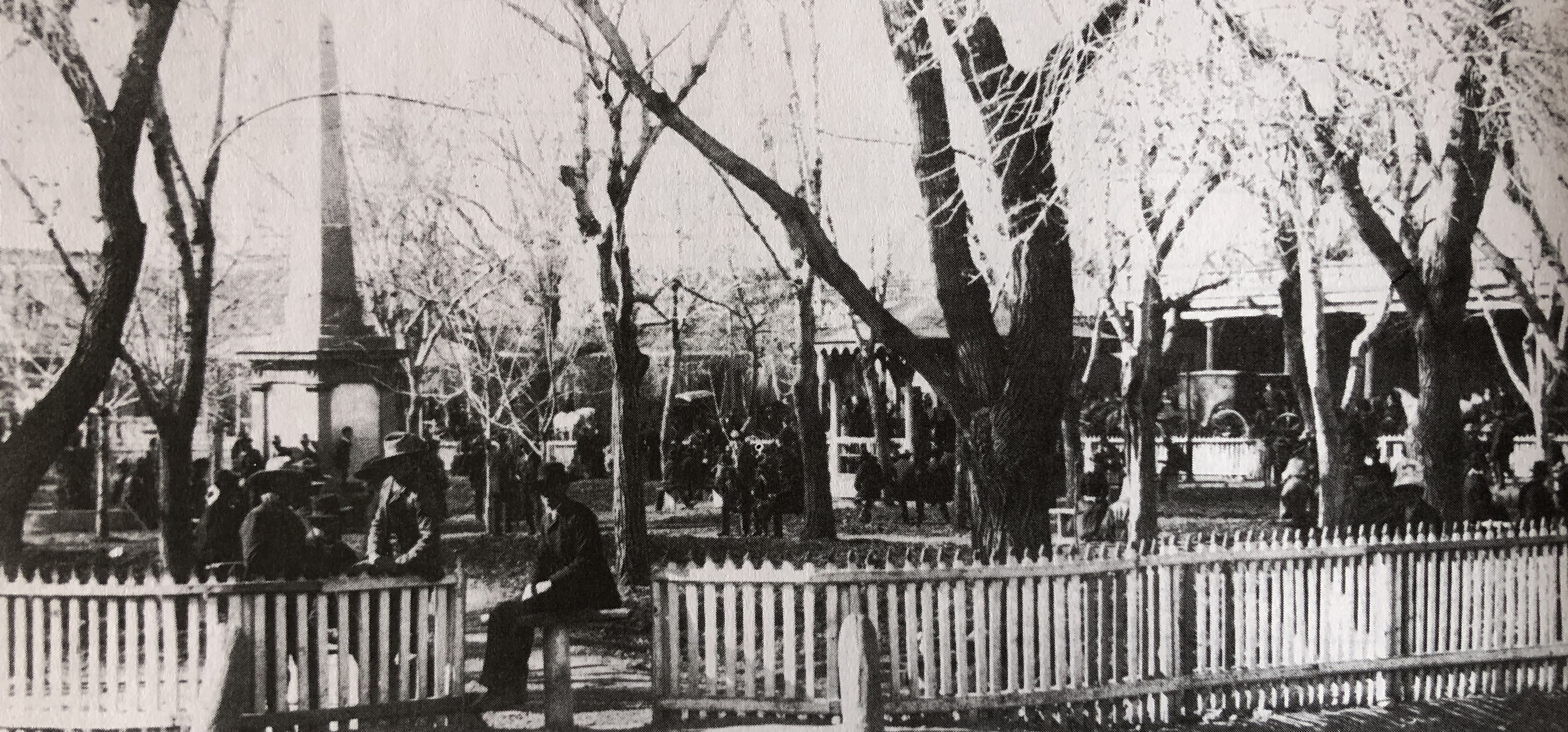
Santa Fe Plaza in 1885, photo by D.B. Chase

The Santa Fe Plaza (Spanish: Plaza de Santa Fe) is a National Historic Landmark in downtown Santa Fe, New Mexico in the style of traditional Spanish-American colonial cities. The plaza, or city square is a gathering place for locals and also a tourist attraction. It is home to annual events including Fiestas de Santa Fe, the Spanish Market, the Santa Fe Bandstand, and the Santa Fe Indian Market.

Listed on the National Register of Historic Places, the plaza consists of a central park lined with grass, trees, and benches. During Christmas time, the plaza is decorated with farolitos, luminarias, and trees lights. The park also includes a performing arts stage.

== History ==
Encompassed in the general plaza area are historic monuments, restaurants, businesses and art galleries, including the Palace of the Governors (the oldest public building in the United States), the New Mexico Museum of Art, Cathedral Basilica of Saint Francis of Assisi, and the Loretto Chapel. In true pueblo fashion, the Plaza architecture is traditional adobe. Just 16 miles (26 km) from the Santa Fe ski basin, the Plaza dates back to the early 17th century when Santa Fe was settled by conquistadors. Until the mid-19th century, the Plaza lacked landscaping, and ownership of the area transitioned between the Spaniards and the Mexicans throughout the earlier years.

=== Pre-Columbian era ===
The area now known as Santa Fe had been inhabited by Tewa and other peoples, for which there is archaeological evidence as near to the Plaza as the Sena compound.

=== Spanish era ===
All Spanish colonial towns with a regional governor's office (for Santa Fe de Nuevo México, that was the Palace of the Governors) were required by the civic planning section of the laws of the Indies to have a Plaza de Armas to marshal the palace guard in. The original Plaza was a presidio surrounded by a large defensive wall that enclosed residences, barracks, a chapel, a prison and the Governor's palace. Eventually the wall gave way to large houses built by high-ranking Spanish officers and officials. In the early days, it was found at the end of El Camino Real (the Spanish Royal Road from Mexico City).

=== Mexican era ===
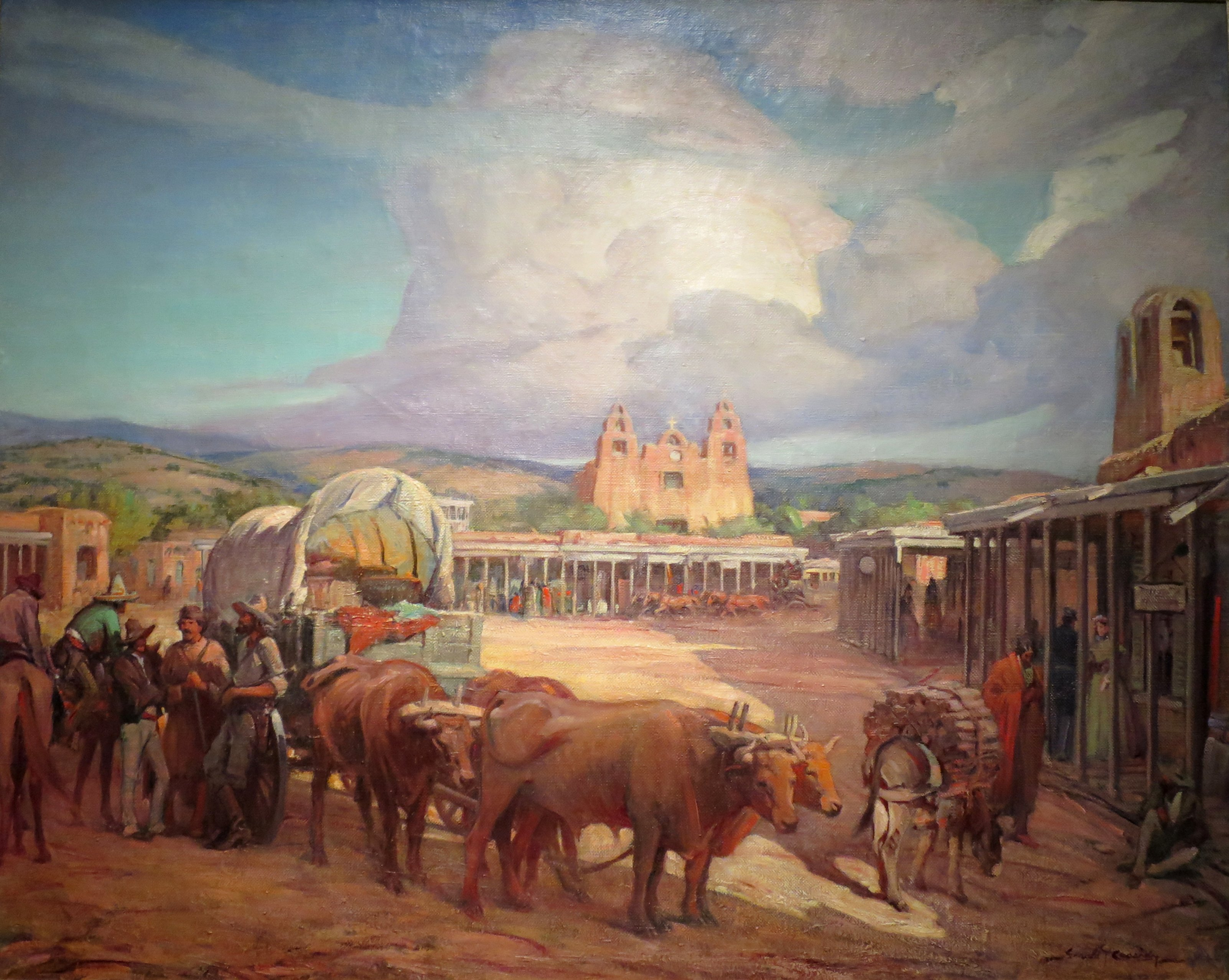
View of Santa Fe Plaza in the 1850s, painting by Gerald Cassidy, c. 1930

With Mexico's Independence from Spain, in 1821, the Santa Fe Trail, a trade route connecting New Mexico with Missouri, was opened with its western terminus at the Santa Fe Plaza. Overland wagon caravans used the plaza to camp and unload trade goods. The Old Pecos Trail also passed nearby before it was rerouted.

=== U.S. territorial era ===
After the New Mexico Territory was established, a fence was built around the plaza to keep out animals. Trees were also planted and pathways were introduced. A bandstand was added at various locations over time, as was the Soldiers' Monument in the plaza center.

=== U.S. statehood ===
After New Mexico was admitted as the 47th state in 1912, a historic preservation plan was established. The plaza is now marked by structures in the Pueblo, Spanish and Territorial styles that reflect its history. Among the most noted are the original palacio, the Palace of the Governors, built between 1610 and 1612 and San Miguel Mission, a noted landmark (c. 1640), and one of the oldest churches in the United States. The plaza is surrounded by restaurants, shops, and museums. Many seasonal community events are held at the plaza.

On October 12, 2020, Indigenous People's Day, the obelisk portion of the Soldiers' Monument in the center of the plaza was toppled by protestors.

== Points of interest ==
The Plaza has several mature trees, street lamps, a banco, a central monument, a buried time capsule, a bandstand and a water fountain. Wireless internet access is also available as of 2019.

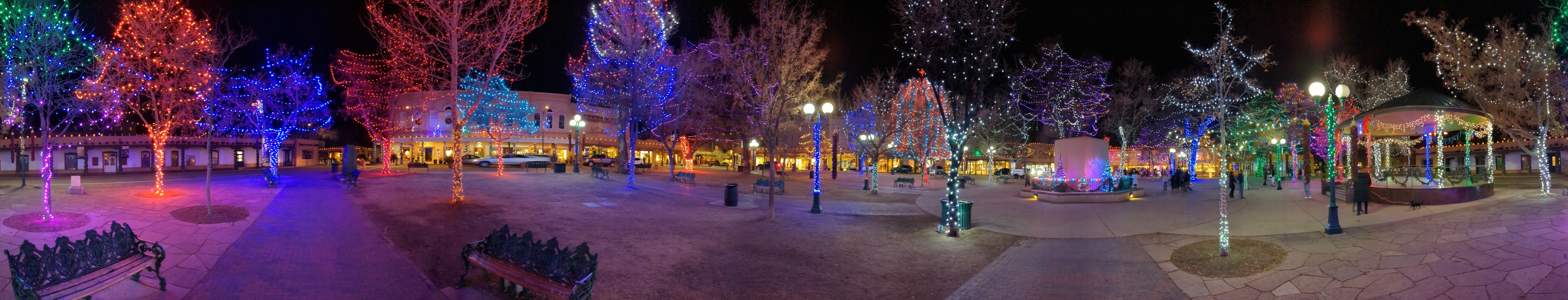
Christmas lighting at the Santa Fe Plaza

== Notable residents ==
- William S. Messervy, Santa Fe trader and acting Governor of New Mexico in 1854, lived in a house on the Plaza.

== See also ==
- National Register of Historic Places listings in Santa Fe County, New Mexico
- List of National Historic Landmarks in New Mexico
