= South Broadway, Albuquerque =

South Broadway
- Neighborhood of Albuquerque
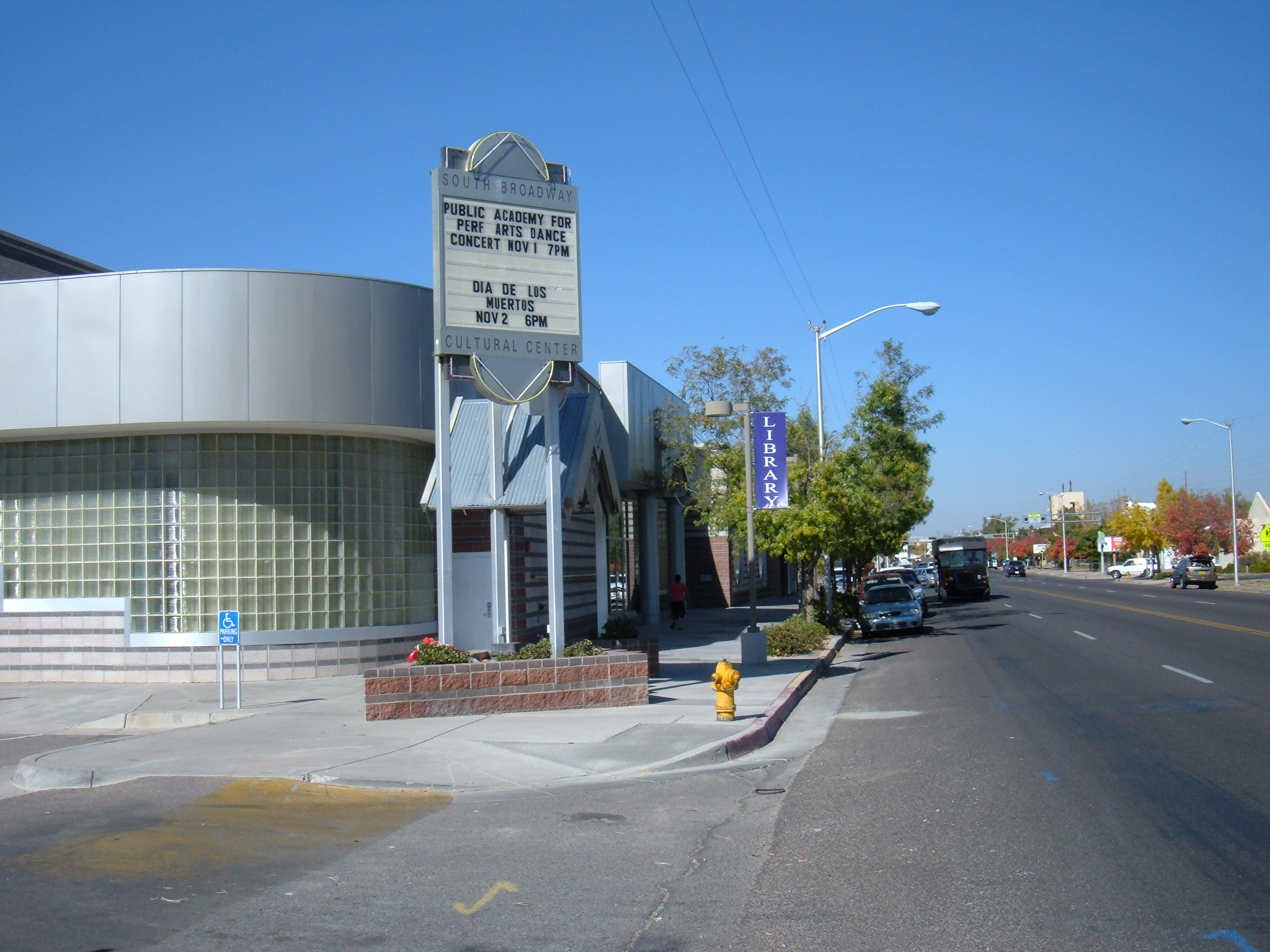
- South Broadway Cultural Center
- Interactive map of South Broadway
- Coordinates: 35°04′12″N 106°38′42″W
- Country: United States
- State: New Mexico
- County: Bernalillo
- City: Albuquerque

Government
  - City Council: Joaquin Baca
  - State House: Gail Chasey (D); Miguel Garcia (D); Javier Martínez (D); G. Andrés Romero (D)
  - State Senate: Jerry Ortiz y Pino (D)
  - U.S. House: Melanie Stansbury (D)

Area
  - Total: 0.68 sq mi (1.8 km^{2})

Population (2010)
  - Total: 4,175
  - Density: 6,160/sq mi (2,380/km^{2})
- ZIP Code: 87102
- Area code: 505

South Broadway is an inner-city neighborhood in Albuquerque, New Mexico, located southeast of Downtown. The neighborhood developed between the 1880s and early 1900s and consists mainly of smaller Victorian homes and bungalows. It was historically a diverse working-class neighborhood and the center of the city's African American community. Along with other New Mexican cities such as Clovis and Hobbs, the neighborhood is one of the centers of Black American culture and history in New Mexico.

Today, a sizeable African American community lives in this area outside downtown Albuquerque, as well as the area near Highland High School, which is about 8% Black, as of 2021.

== Geography ==
According to the South Broadway Neighborhood Association, the boundaries of the neighborhood are the Burlington Northern Santa Fe railroad tracks to the west, Coal Avenue to the north, Interstate 25 to the east, and Gibson Boulevard, Broadway Boulevard, and Kathryn Avenue to the south. Adjoining neighborhoods include Barelas to the west, Huning Highlands to the north, and San Jose to the south. The terrain consists of rising sand hills which increase in elevation from west to east.

== Demographics ==
The 2010 United States census recorded a population in South Broadway of approximately 4,175 residents. The racial breakdown of the neighborhood was 80% Hispanic, 11% non-Hispanic white, 6% Black, 1% American Indian, and 2% other races or mixed-race.

== History ==
South Broadway was platted in the 1880s immediately after the arrival of the Atchison, Topeka, and Santa Fe Railway, the event which launched the development of "New Town," or what is now Downtown Albuquerque. The neighborhood was built during the 1890s and early 20th century. The northern six blocks of South Broadwy Neighborhood (between Coal Avenue and Lead Avenue) are included in the Huning Highlands Historic District. In the Sanborn map of 1891 (annotations in sheet 1), these blocks contain contain twenty dwellings, the only dwellings indicated in what was to become South Broadway Neighborhood, although the Koch map of 1886 indicates a scattering of apparently rural structures.

It contains a variety of modestly-sized Victorian homes. Initially a working-class community, most residents were employed at the Santa Fe Railway Shops and Albuquerque Foundry and Machine Works, both of which adjoined the neighborhood.

Ethnicity evolved: Below is Flint & Flint's table showing the shift of South Broadway from workers originating in the eastern United States and Europe, toward the more endemic Hispanic population. Data are from the city directories for those years.

Ethnicity (Surname Proxy)
Year	1896	1919	1950
Hispanic	4.3%	31.4%	67.6%
Non-hispanic	95.6%	68.6%	32.4%

Two trends are represented here:
1) The Hispanic population, through training, and experience, gain presence in the workforce at the rail-yard shops.
2) Albuquerque diversifies becoming less of a company town and inner-city neighborhoods adjoining the rail-yard shops (South Broadway and Barelas) diversify.

From the 1950s into the early 1980s, work at the shops declined and eventually stopped as diesel locomotives replaced the higher-maintenance steam locomotives. With diminished employment, income in South Broadway declined causing urban decay and white flight. South Broadway became the center of Albuquerque's African American community and was home to many Black-owned businesses as well as New Mexico's oldest Black church, Grant Chapel African Methodist Episcopalian Church. Urban renewal efforts in the 1970s resulted in some demolitions, many of which remain as empty lots.

== Education ==
South Broadway is served by Albuquerque Public Schools. Students attend Eugene Field or East San Jose Elementary School, Washington or Jefferson Middle School, and Albuquerque High School.

== Transportation ==
The main thoroughfares in South Broadway are Broadway Boulevard (NM 47), which runs through the neighborhood from north to south, and Avenida César Chávez, which runs from east to west and connects with Barelas, the West Side, and the University of New Mexico South Campus. The neighborhood also has access to Interstate 25 immediately to the east.

Public bus transit in South Broadway is provided by ABQ RIDE's 16 Broadway-University-Gibson route.
