= U.S. Bank Stadium =

Stadium in Minneapolis, Minnesota

- The Ship; The Bank

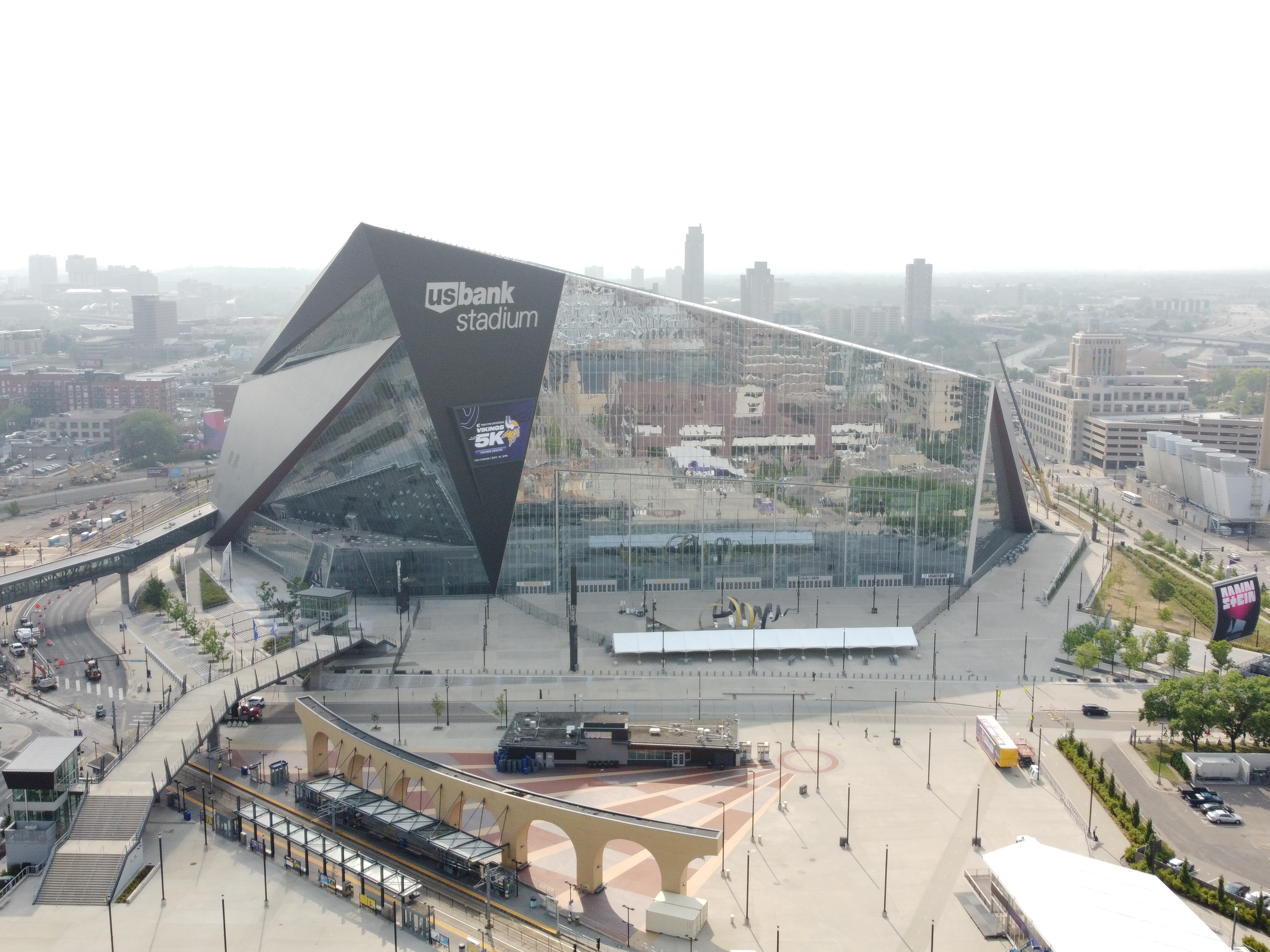
- U.S. Bank Stadium in August 2021

- Location in Minnesota Location in the United States
- Address: 401 Chicago Avenue
- Location: Minneapolis, Minnesota, U.S.
- Coordinates: 44.974°N 93.258°W
- Owner: Minnesota Sports Facilities Authority
- Operator: ASM Global
- Capacity: 66,202 (expandable to 73,000) Former capacity: List: 66,467 (Football; 2019–2021); 66,860 (Football; 2017–2018); 66,200 (Football; 2016)
- Executive suites: 131
- Roof: Skylight
- Surface: Act Global Xtreme Turf DX
- Record attendance: 72,711 (2019 NCAA Men's Final Four)
- Field size: Left field: 328 ft (100 m); Left-center: 375 ft (114 m); Center field: 400 ft (120 m); Right-center: 350 ft (110 m); Right field: 300 ft (91 m); Left field wall: 8 ft (2.4 m); Right field wall: 34 ft (10 m)
- Public transit: Blue Line; Green Line at U.S. Bank Stadium station

Construction
- Groundbreaking: December 3, 2013; 12 years ago
- Opened: July 22, 2016; 10 years ago
- Cost: $1.061 billion ($1.42 billion in 2025 dollars)
- Architect: HKS
- Project manager: Hammes Company
- Structural engineer: Thornton Tomasetti
- Services engineers: M-E Engineers, Inc.
- General contractor: Mortenson Construction

Tenants
- Minnesota Vikings (NFL) (2016–present); Minnesota Golden Gophers (NCAA); Baseball (2017–present); Softball (2023–present)

Website
- usbankstadium.com

U.S. Bank Stadium is an indoor stadium in Minneapolis, Minnesota, U.S. Opened in 2016, the stadium was built on the former site of the Hubert H. Humphrey Metrodome and is the home venue of the Minnesota Vikings of the National Football League (NFL). It also hosts early season college baseball games of the Minnesota Golden Gophers.

The Vikings played at the Hubert H. Humphrey Metrodome from 1982 until its closure in 2013; during construction, the Vikings played two seasons (2014, 2015) at the open-air Huntington Bank Stadium on the campus of the University of Minnesota.

It was the first indoor stadium built in the NFL since Ford Field in Detroit, which opened in 2002. As of March 2015, the overall budget was estimated to be $1.061 billion, with $348 million from the state of Minnesota, $150 million from the city of Minneapolis, and $551 million from the team and private contributions. U.S. Bank Stadium hosted Super Bowl LII won by the Philadelphia Eagles on February 4, 2018, the ESPN X Games on July 19–22, 2018, and the 2019 NCAA Final Four won by Virginia. In 2023, The Athletic ranked U.S. Bank Stadium as the top NFL venue.

== Design ==
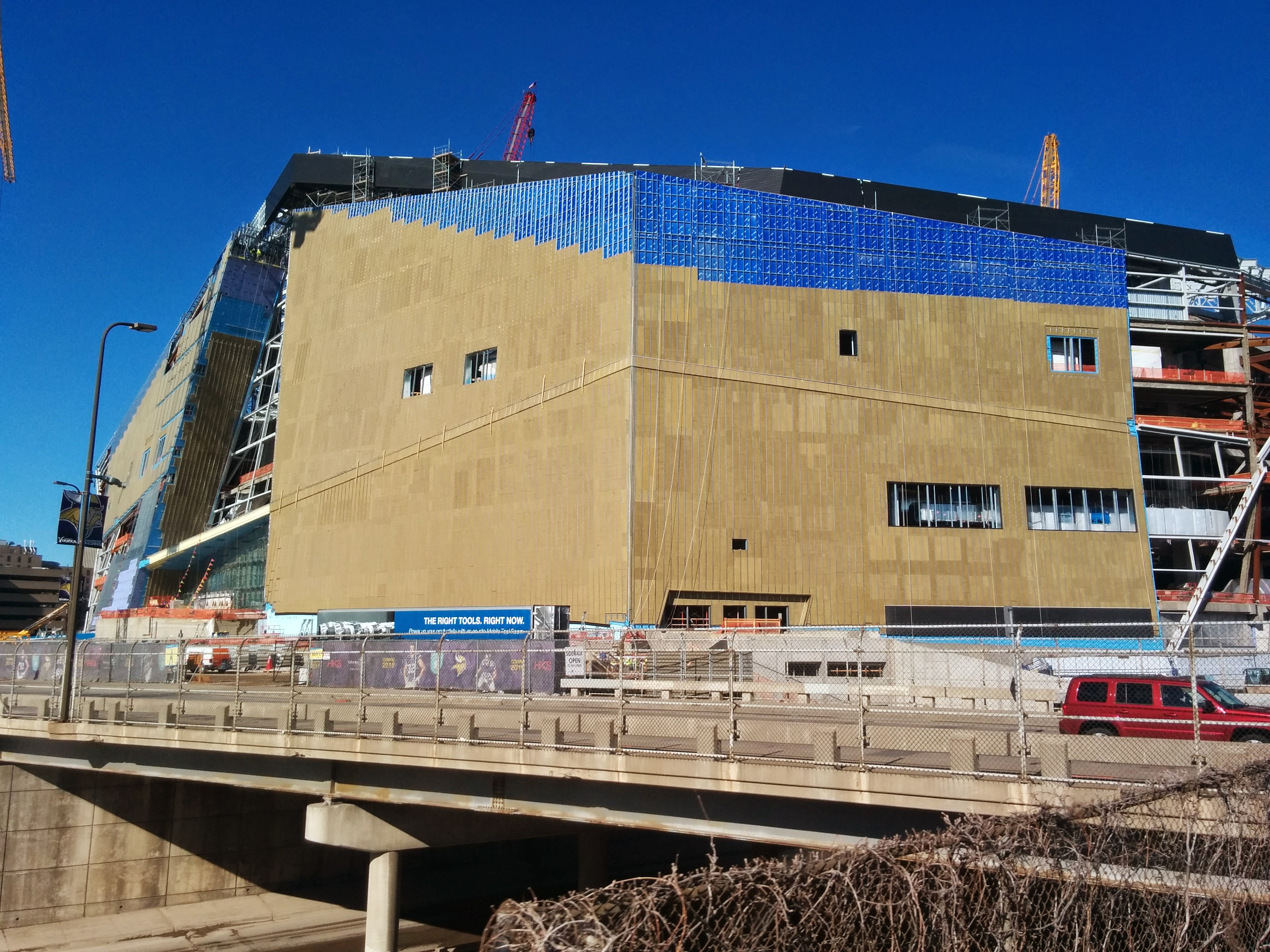
From directly east of the stadium: the southeast facade with doors and windows going in, as well as the northeast facade with part of its exterior wall up.

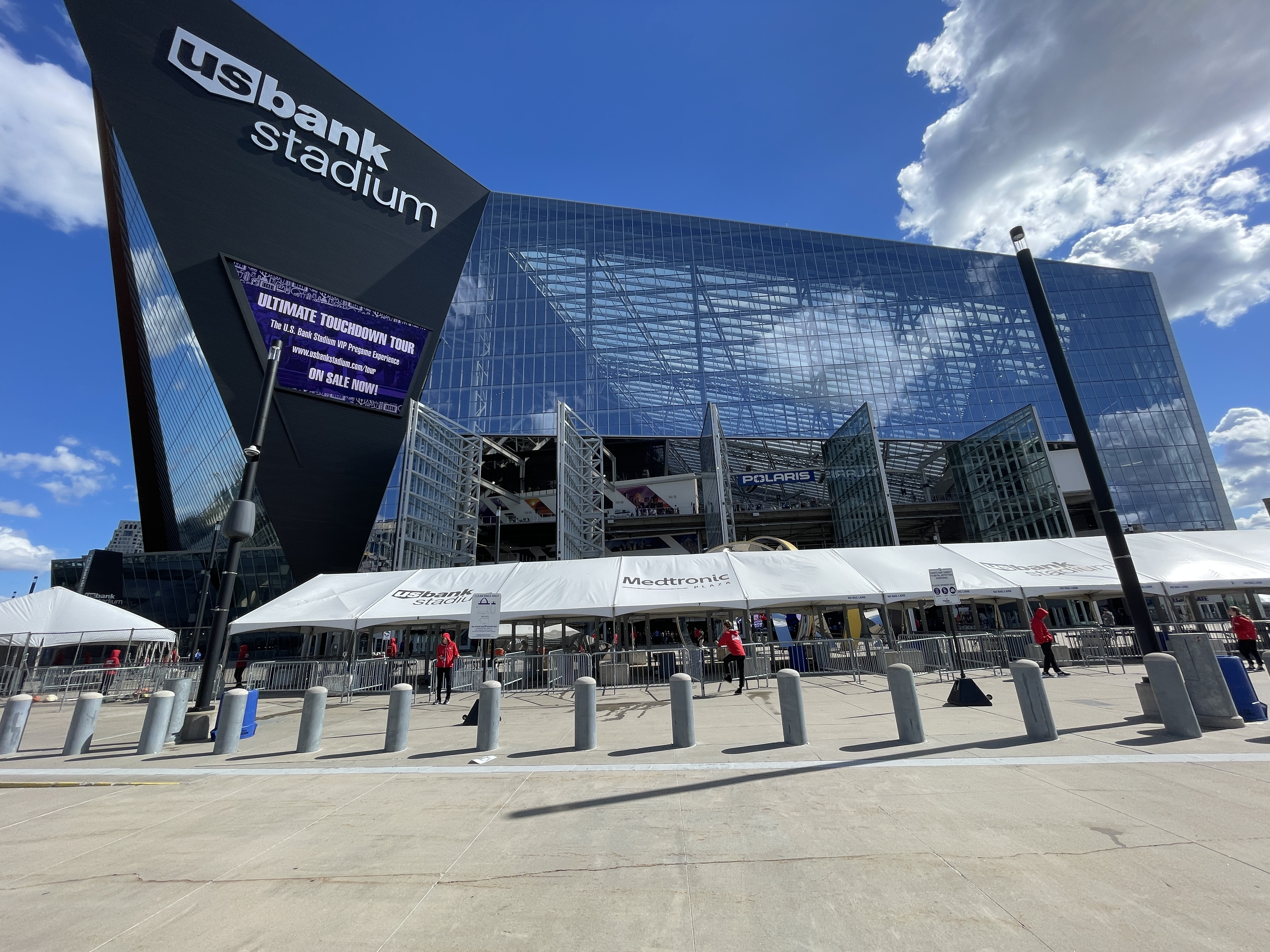
U.S. Bank Stadium with the five doors open.

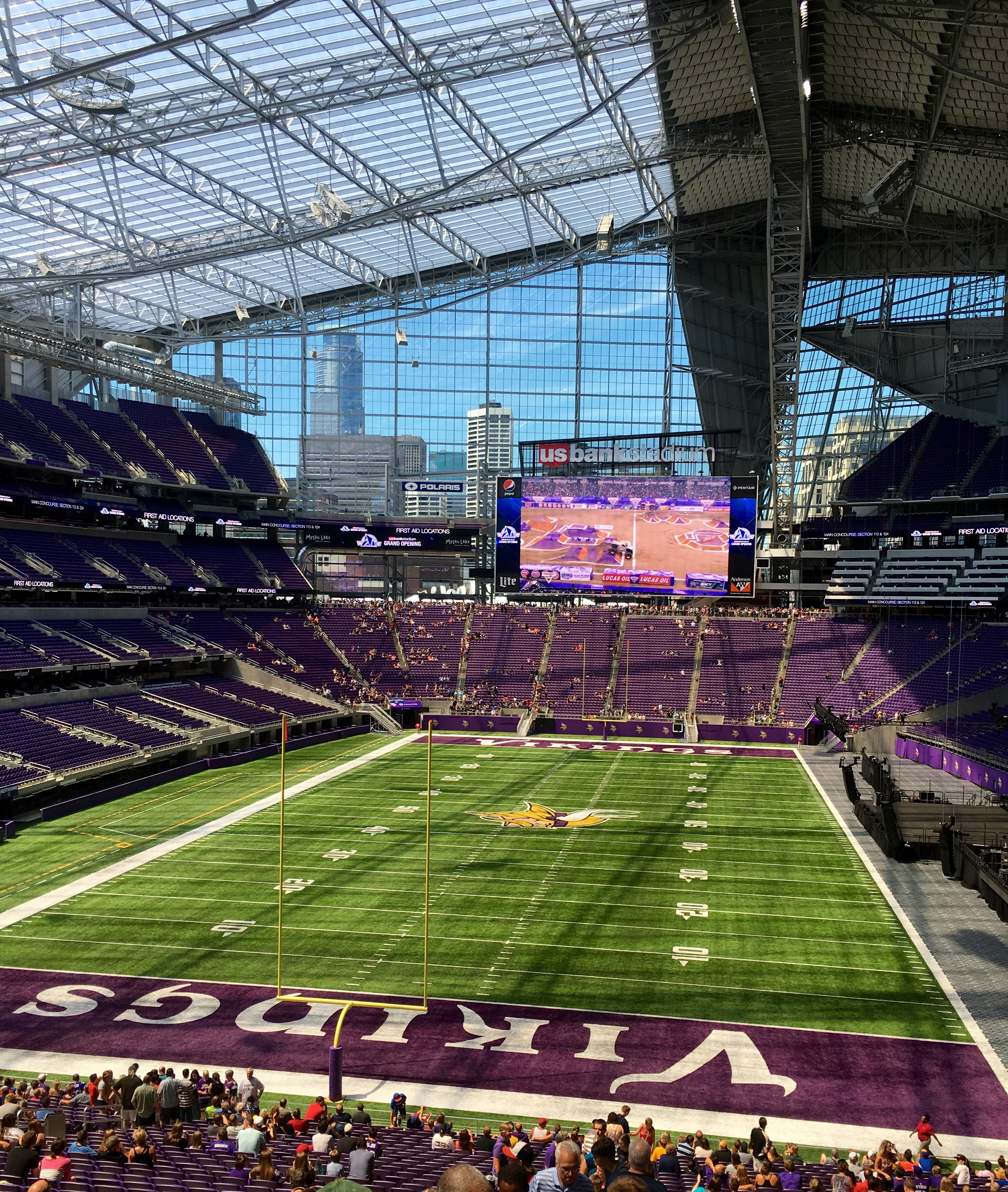
The stadium has translucent roof and walls made of ETFE

While the Vikings' owners wanted an outdoor stadium, the state and local governments would only provide funding for an indoor stadium capable of hosting major events like the Super Bowl and the Final Four. A retractable roof was the trend in 2010s football stadiums. However, retractable roof facilities are not typically designed for the roof to be opened and closed in sub-freezing conditions. When built in temperate climates, retractable roofs are generally kept closed throughout the winter months, both to reduce the stress on the roof and its components and also to reduce or eliminate the need to winterize the stadium's interior. In contrast, to be of any competitive on-field advantage to the Vikings, a retractable roof facility would have needed to be designed to operate in a Minnesotan winter so as to allow the Vikings to play a home game outdoors during the NFL playoffs. Eventually, this design was deemed too expensive.

Architectural firm HKS designed a skylit roof made of ETFE and glazed entrances with giant pivoting doors, aiming to get as much natural light from the outside as possible. The roof is made up of 60% Ethylene tetrafluoroethylene (ETFE), a fluorine-based clear plastic, and is the largest in North America, spanning 240,000 square feet (22,000 m^{2}) supplied and installed by the firm Vector Foiltec. ETFE's low R-factor and the roof's slanted design, inspired by Nordic vernacular architecture, allows the stadium to endure heavy snow loads. Snow accumulates in areas that are more safely and easily accessible, and also moves down the slanted roof into a heated gutter, the water from which drains to the nearby Mississippi River.

The roof and wall panels also provide views of downtown Minneapolis. The glass operable wall panels allow the stadium to experience some of the outdoor elements while providing protection from the snow, rain, and the cold winter weather. The stadium is aligned northwest and the elevation at street level is approximately 840 feet (255 m) above sea level.

Conservation groups – including the Minnesota Department of Natural Resources and the Audubon Society – requested a "bird-friendly" design of the stadium's exterior using slightly less transparent bird-safe glass. Designers instead opted to use highly reflective glass for aesthetic reasons. The reflective glass, combined with the stadium's location along the Mississippi Flyway migration route, has resulted in a large number of bird deaths, double than any other building in Minneapolis. A "bird fatality study" financed by the Vikings and the Minnesota Sports Facilities Authority was completed in 2019. Recommendations include treating the glass to decrease reflectivity, especially in areas that reflect lots of vegetation, and turning off lights when migration rates are at their highest.

U.S. Bank Stadium's synthetic turf field received a B grade in the NFL Players Association's 2026 report cards, the highest grade among artificial turf surfaces in the league - even higher than seven natural grass stadiums .

=== Capacity ===
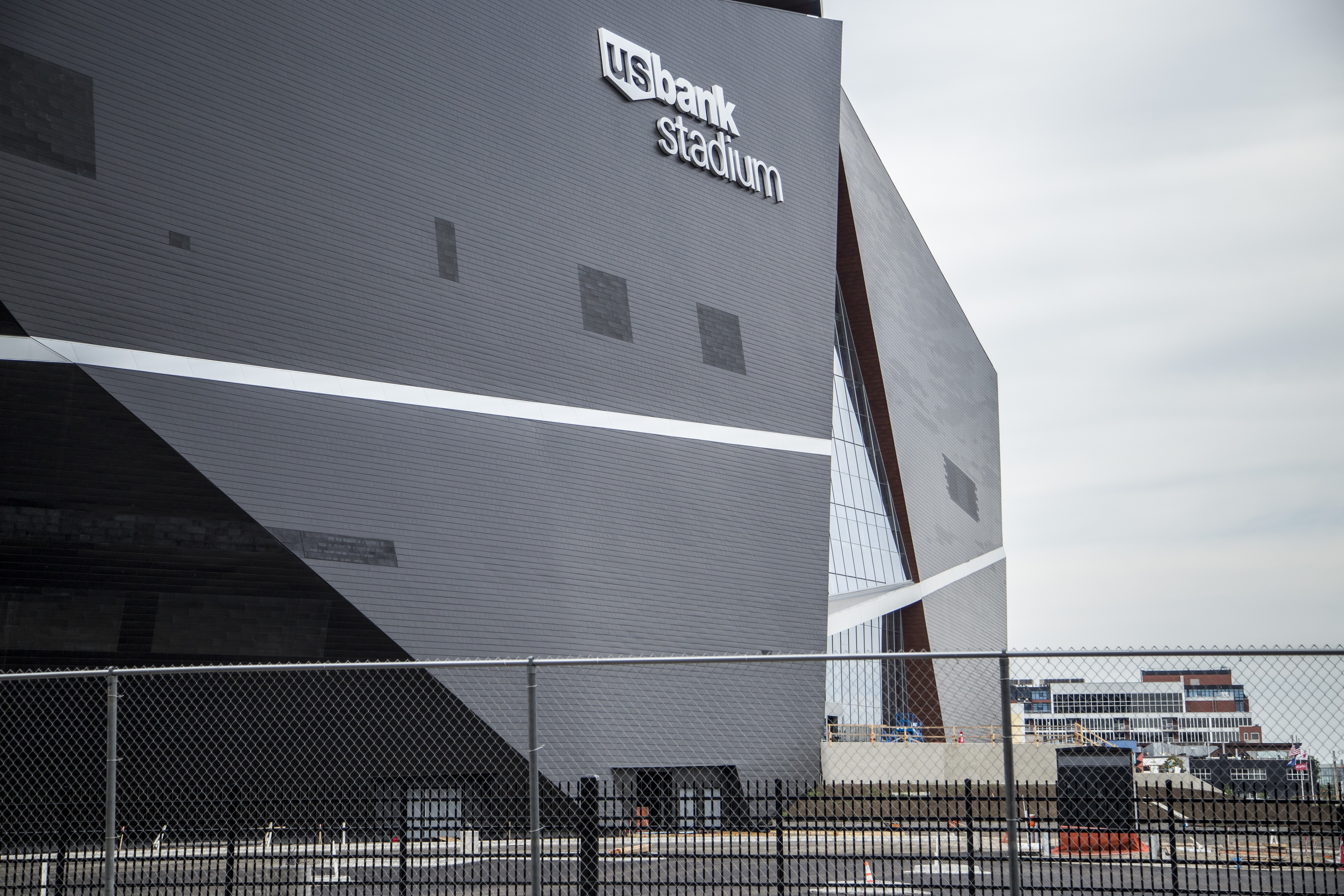
Dark facade side of stadium

The usual seating capacity is 66,860, which can be expanded to 73,000.

Regular season games
Year	Total	Games	Average	Season highest
2016	534,289	8	66,789	Dallas (66,860)
2017	533,764	8	66,721	Green Bay (66,848)
2018	534,491	8	66,811	Chicago (66,878)
2019	534,804	8	66,850	Green Bay (67,167)
2020	No attendance due to the COVID-19 pandemic			
2021	533,613	8	66,713	Green Bay (66,959)
2022	600,183	9	66,687	New York Jets (66,973)
2023	535,308	8	66,913	Kansas City Chiefs and Green Bay Packers (67,003)
2024	535,438	8	66,929	Green Bay Packers (67,031)

== Minnesota Sports Facilities Authority ==
The Minnesota Sports Facilities Authority (MSFA) is the public authority that owns and operates U.S. Bank Stadium in Minneapolis, Minnesota. It was established in 2012 by the Minnesota Legislature as the successor organization to the Metropolitan Sports Facilities Commission (MSFC), which was established in 1977 to oversee the construction of the Hubert H. Humphrey Metrodome; the MSFC owned and operated the Metrodome in a similar fashion to the MSFA. The MSFA initially oversaw the Metrodome until the stadium was demolished to make way for U.S. Bank Stadium in early 2014. Three of its five members are appointed by the Governor of Minnesota, with the remaining two being appointed by the mayor of Minneapolis.

Public involvement in stadiums within the Twin Cities area has existed ever since interest in professional sports within the area started to grow in the early 1950s. The cities of Minneapolis and Bloomington formed the Metropolitan Sports Area Commission (MSAC) on August 13, 1954, to oversee the construction and operation of Metropolitan Stadium in the latter city, with the stadium opening in 1956. However, with the Minnesota Vikings dissatisfied by the state of the stadium in the 1970s, plans were devised for its replacement by local and state governments.

When the Metropolitan Sports Facilities Commission was formed in 1977, it absorbed the MSAC and took over the operations of Metropolitan Stadium; it would continue to do so until the end of 1981 with the Metrodome's opening the following year. The commission was composed of seven members, six of which were appointed by the Minneapolis City Council. The chair, however, was appointed by the Governor of Minnesota and could not reside in Minneapolis. The commission was abolished by the Minnesota Legislature as part of legislation that funded U.S. Bank Stadium in May 2012; its assets were transferred to the Minnesota Sports Facilities Authority.

=== Metrodome lease ===
The Vikings' lease with the Metropolitan Sports Facilities Commission (MSFC), as signed by both parties in August 1979, kept them in the Metrodome until 2011. The lease was considered one of the least lucrative among NFL teams; it included provisions where the commission owned the stadium, and the Vikings were locked into paying rent until the end of the 2011 season. For several years prior to the Metrodome's demolition, however, the Metropolitan Sports Facilities Commission waived the team's nearly $4 million rent. The Vikings paid the MSFC 9.5% of their ticket sales; the commission "reserve[d] all rights to sell or lease advertising in any part of the Stadium", the team could not use the scoreboard for any ads, and the team did not control naming rights for the building. Though the Vikings received revenue from the sale of luxury suites during the Minnesota Twins baseball season (a contributing factor to the Twins leaving the Metrodome for Target Field in 2010), the commission controlled the limited parking and its revenue and paid the team 10% of all concession sales while retaining roughly 35% of concessions sold during Vikings games. The Vikings were 30th out of 32 NFL teams in local revenues in 2005. The Vikings, as well as the stadium's other tenants, continually turned down any proposals for renovating the Metrodome itself. A plan for a joint Vikings/University of Minnesota football stadium was proposed in 2002, but differences over how the stadium would be designed and run, as well as state budget constraints, led to the plan's failure. The university would eventually open its own TCF Bank Stadium in 2009.

== Downtown Minneapolis ==
From the outset, Zygi Wilf, a billionaire from New Jersey and principal owner of the Vikings since 2005, had stated he was interested in redeveloping the downtown site of the Metrodome no matter where the new facility was built. Taking into consideration downtown Minneapolis' growing mass transit network, cultural institutions, and growing condo and office markets, Wilf considered underdeveloped areas on Downtown's east side, centered on the Metrodome, to be a key opportunity and began discussing the matter with neighboring landholders, primarily the City of Minneapolis and the Star Tribune. An unrelated 2008 study explains that the effect of the media, in this case an uncritical Star Tribune, matters a great deal in helping a stadium initiative. As a result, once negotiations for a different location had been put aside, the Vikings focused on proposing a stadium that would be the centerpiece of a larger urban redevelopment project.

Wilf's Vikings began acquiring significant land holdings in the Downtown East neighborhood around the Metrodome. In June 2007, the Vikings acquired four blocks of mostly empty land surrounding the Star Tribune headquarters from Avista Capital Partners (the private equity owner of the Star Tribune) for $45 million; it is also believed the Vikings have first right of refusal to later buy the paper's headquarters building. In May 2007, the Vikings also acquired three other downtown parking lots for a total of $5 million, and have made a bid for a city-owned, underground parking ramp next to the neighborhood's light rail station.

== Proposal timeline ==
=== 2007 ===
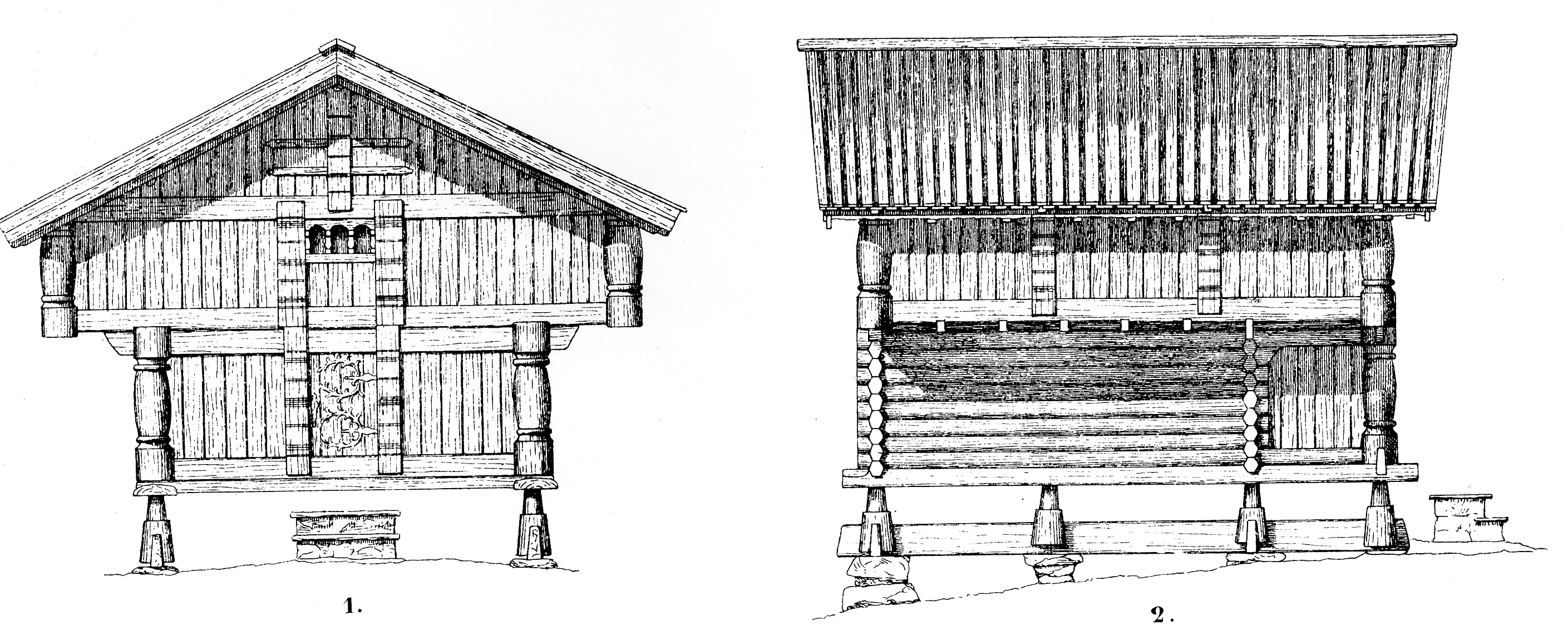
Example of Nordic vernacular architecture, the style used for the design of the stadium roof

On April 19, 2007, the MSFC and the Vikings unveiled their initial plans for the stadium and surrounding urban area, with an estimated opening of 2012. The plan included substantial improvements to the surrounding area, including an improved light rail stop, 4,500 residential units, hotels with a combined 270 rooms, 1.7 million square feet (160,000 m^{2}) of office space and substantial retail space.

As of 2007, the stadium would have held approximately 73,600 people and was to have been complete by August 2011. The initial proposal did not have the final architectural design renderings, but did include key features that were to have been included in any final plan, including the plans for neighboring urban development. These included demands for a retractable roof, an open view of the surroundings (particularly the downtown skyline), a glass-enclosed Winter Garden alongside the already-existing adjacent Metrodome light-rail stop, leafy urban square with outdoor cafés and dense housing around its edges, aesthetic improvements to roads connecting the stadium to nearby cultural institutions, and adaptive reuse of neighboring historic buildings. The roof would have allowed Minneapolis to remain a potential venue for the Super Bowl and Final Four, both of which had been held at the Metrodome. The proposed urban plan itself was received with cautious welcome.

The 2007 proposed cost estimate for the downtown Minneapolis stadium was $953.916 million. The total broke down to $616.564 million for the stadium, $200.729 million for a retractable roof, $58.13 million for parking, $8.892 million for adjacent land right-of-way, and $69.601 million to take into account inflation by 2010. The estimate compared to then-upcoming stadiums in Indianapolis at $675 million (retractable roof, completed 2008), Dallas at $932 million (retractable roof, completed 2009), and New York $1.7 billion (open-air, completed in 2010). In addition, according to Wilf, taking into account the costs for the surrounding urban developments put forth in the proposal would have brought the estimated total to $2 billion. The estimated costs were based on projected 2008 construction and material costs, so it would have been possible that the stadium costs could have hovered near $1 billion if the Minnesota State Legislature had not approved the project in the 2008 session.

No proposals were made, at that time, for paying for the stadium. The MSFC and Vikings made initial pitches to the Minnesota State Legislature during the end of the 2007 session, but expected to make serious efforts during the 2008 legislative session. The Vikings proposed creating a Minnesota Football Stadium Task Force, which they expect would take 24 months to plan the stadium.

=== 2008 ===
Following the September 2008 MSFC vote to start feasibility studies for re-using the Metrodome, an unrelated study released for 38 U.S. cities found that "when a [NFL] team wins, people's moods improve", and that personal income for residents of a city with an NFL team with 10 wins increases about $165 per year. While true for NFL football, for comparison, professional baseball and basketball gain no personal income for residents.

=== 2009 ===
Feasibility studies for Dallas-based design and local construction of a new stadium were expected in early 2009. Roy Terwilliger, a former Republican state senator from Edina, Ray Waldron, an AFL-CIO leader, and the Dome engineering expert and CEO, Bill Lester and Steve Maki of the MSFC selected architectural firm HKS and construction manager Mortenson. Loanne Thrane of St. Paul, the sole female member of the commission, voiced opposition and later voted with the majority.

In December 2009, commission chairman Terwilliger said, "We know what the art of the possible is at this particular location." A new proposal for 65,000 seats with a sliding roof was unveiled at $84 million less than the previous proposal, but with $50 million per year more scheduled for each year that construction is delayed. Vikings officials boycotted the presentation which estimated the total cost at $870 million, or $770 million if the sliding roof were omitted.

=== 2010 ===
The 2010 Vikings stadium proposal was dealt a setback on May 5, 2010, when a Minnesota House panel defeated the proposal by a 10–9 vote.

The stadium debate was revived in the aftermath of the Metrodome's roof deflation on December 12, 2010, which forced the relocation of the Vikings' final two home games of the 2010 season and led to more calls for a new stadium from various sources in the local and national media. Minnesota Governor Mark Dayton discussed the matter with NFL commissioner Roger Goodell, but said "any new stadium must first benefit the people of Minnesota".

=== 2011 ===
==== City of Minneapolis Proposal ====
After Hennepin County stopped their pursuit of a Vikings stadium, the city of Minneapolis submitted a plan for a Vikings' stadium at the downtown Metrodome site. The Minneapolis plan was for a fixed-roof stadium costing an estimated $895 million. The proposal also included funding solutions for $95 million in renovations to the Target Center. The team reacted with skepticism to the proposal and did not want to play at nearby 50,000-seat capacity University of Minnesota TCF Bank Stadium during the three years of construction. Because the Minneapolis dome site was a less expensive option, football fans were expected to return to the Minneapolis plan if the shortfall in the Ramsey County plan were not realized.

==== Ramsey County Proposal ====
In May 2011, Ramsey County officials announced they had reached an agreement with the Minnesota Vikings to be the team's local partner for a new stadium, subject to approval by the Minnesota Legislature and to approval of a sales tax by the Ramsey County Board. The site of the stadium would be the former Twin Cities Army Ammunitions Plant in Arden Hills, which is about 10 miles (16 km) from the Metrodome in Minneapolis and is a Superfund clean up site. The agreement called for an $884 million stadium and an additional $173 million for on-site infrastructure, parking and environmental costs.

Ramsey County said the Vikings would commit $407 million to the project, which would have been about 44% of the stadium cost and 39% of the overall cost. The county's cost would have been $350 million, to be financed by a half-cent sales tax increase. The state of Minnesota's cost would have been $300 million. This totaled about $1.057 billion, leaving at least a $131 million shortfall.

On March 1, 2012, Governor Dayton announced an agreement for a new stadium to be built on the site of the Metrodome, pending approval by the state legislature and the Minneapolis city council. The $975 million project, half of which would be publicly funded, would be patterned after Lucas Oil Stadium. It would use part of the footprint of the Metrodome and would only require the Vikings to play at TCF Bank Stadium during the final year of construction. The agreement met with mixed reaction, and some criticized the proposal as being unfair to taxpayers and a giveaway to team owners.

On May 10, 2012, the Minnesota Legislature approved funding for a new Vikings stadium on that site. The project is projected to have a $975 million price tag, with the Vikings covering $477 million, the state covering $348 million, and $150 million covered by a hospitality tax in Minneapolis. The city of Minneapolis must pay a total of $678 million over the 30-year life of the deal, including interest, operations, and construction costs. The bill was signed by Governor Dayton and received the approval of the Minneapolis City Council on May 25, 2012. The Vikings played in the Metrodome through the 2013 season, as construction did not require the dome's immediate demolition. Under the leadership of Vikings COO Kevin Warren, the team moved to TCF Bank Stadium on the University of Minnesota campus until the new stadium was completed.

In January 2014, a lawsuit was started by former Minneapolis mayoral candidate Doug Mann and two others to block the construction of the new stadium. The suit questioned the constitutionality of the stadium's funding plan and delayed a $468 million bond sale. Officials warned the delay could stall the project's timeline and add costs. The lawsuit was later dismissed by the Minnesota Supreme Court.

== Charitable gambling funding ==
The State of Minnesota's portion of the cost of the stadium was to be funded by revenue from a proposed new charitable gambling source, which was dubbed electronic pulltabs. When the stadium funding bill was passed in the legislature and signed by the governor on May 14, 2012, the new revenue from the games was estimated to be $34 million for 2013 and rising each year thereafter.

=== Initial poor revenue forecasts ===
Six months later, a budget estimate from the Minnesota Office of Management and Budget revised the projected revenue from electronic pulltab games. This first revision cut the estimated 2013 revenue by 51% to $16 million.

In March 2013, the Minnesota Office of Management and Budget's updated forecast for fiscal years 2013 to 2017 included another revision in the projected revenue from charitable gambling sources to $1.7 million, a further 90% reduction in the estimate for 2013. This total was a 95% reduction from the original estimate of $34 million in the stadium bill passed in May 2012. As a result of the projected shortfall, members of the Minnesota Legislature and the Governor's office began discussing ideas to fix the shortfall. The legislature decided to impose a one-time inventory tax on cigarettes to make up for any shortfall over the next year of construction and close a corporate income-tax loophole for the following years.

=== Uptick in revenue and payoff proposal ===
The state reported in July 2016 that pulltab revenue was "soaring" and that there was optimism in Minneapolis about its continuing to rise. By January 2023, electronic pulltab revenue had increased substantially enough that Governor Tim Walz proposed paying off the outstanding bond debt from the state's contribution to the stadium cost. The gambling-funded stadium reserve fund would cover almost all of the payment, with the remainder coming from the general fund. If approved, the final payment would be made over twenty years earlier than initially planned.

== Construction ==
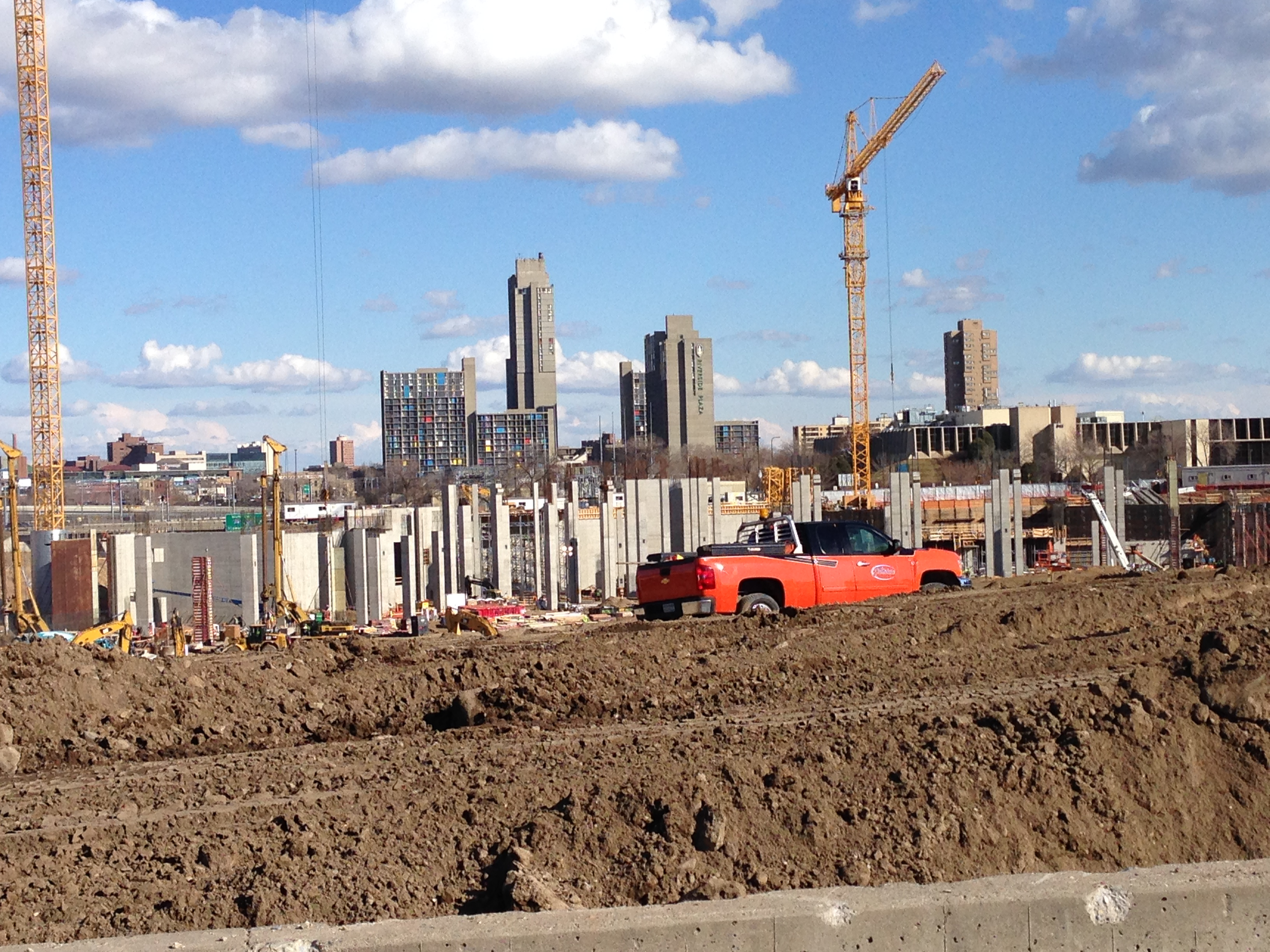
April 7, 2014, soon after the demolition of the Metrodome, pit dig, and start of construction

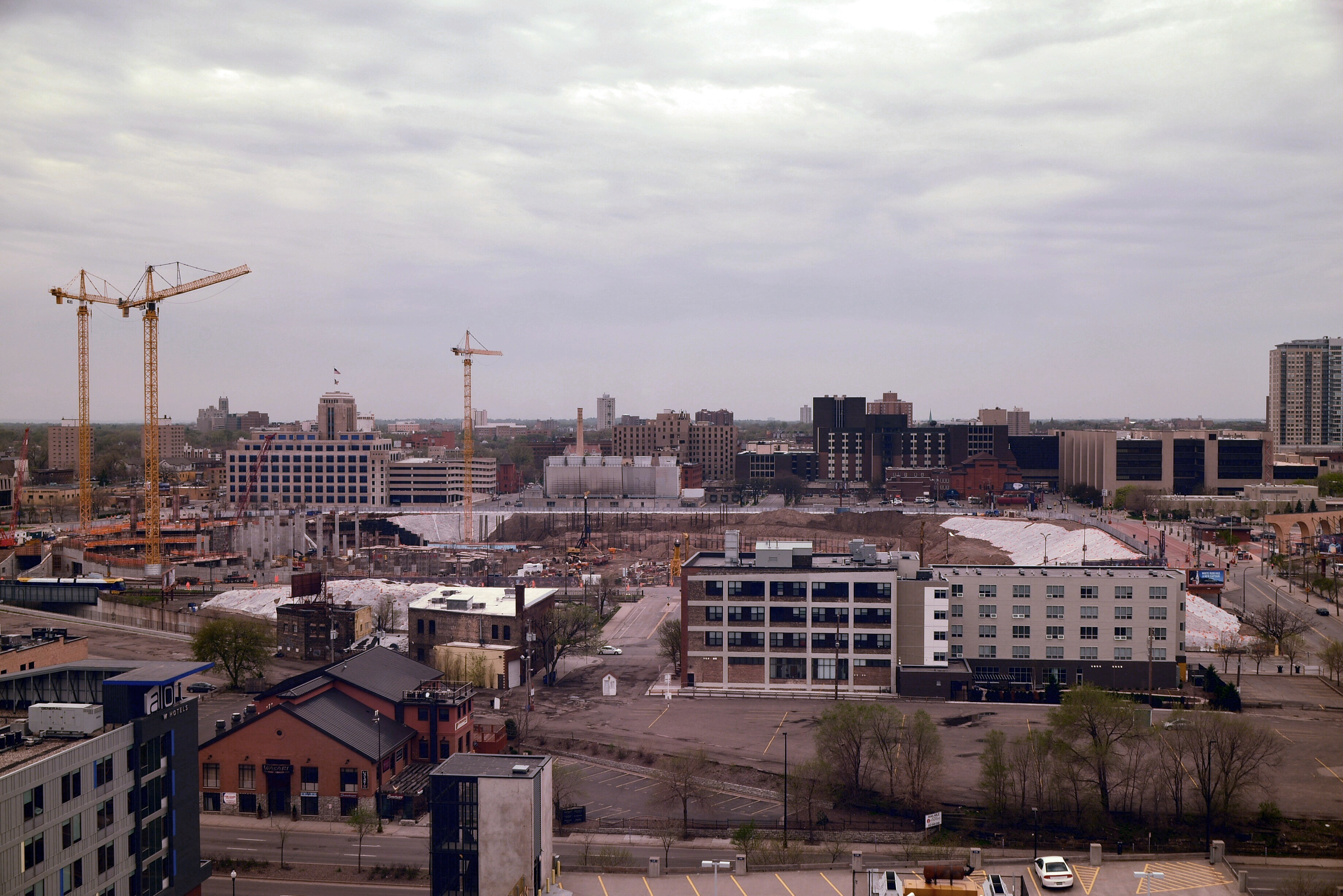
May 11, 2014: Aerial view of the construction pit

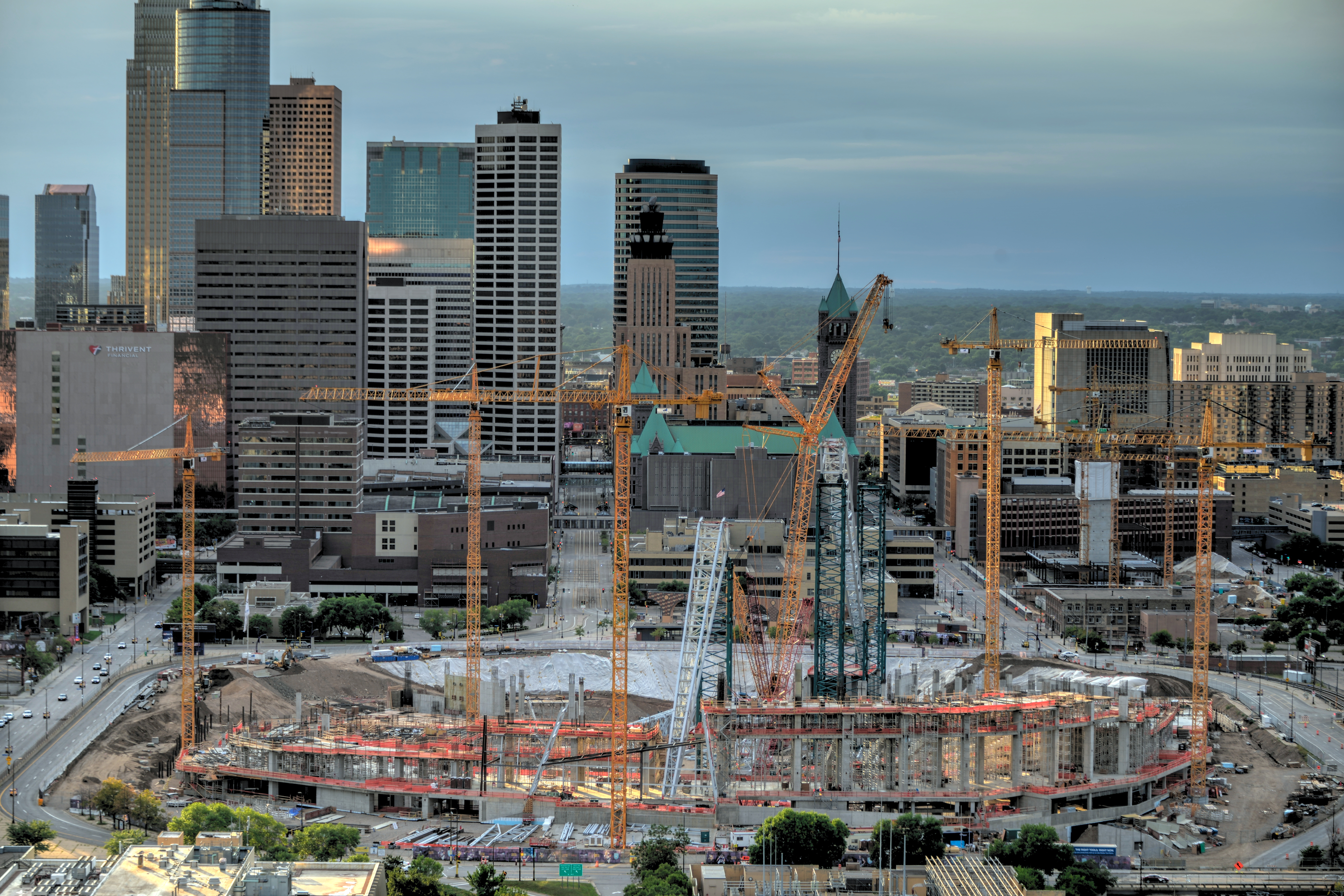
August 26, 2014: Aerial view from Riverside Plaza

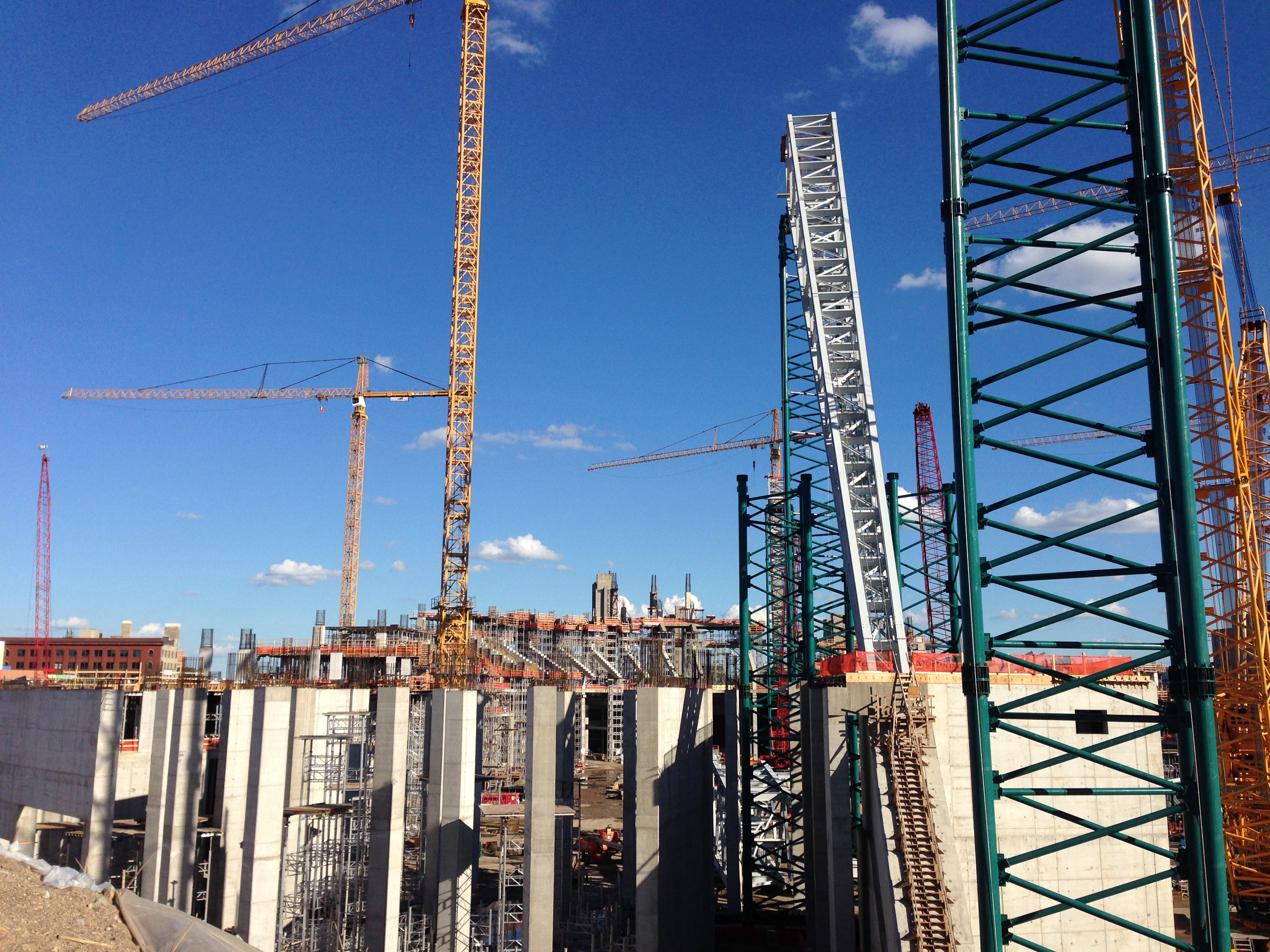
September 2, 2014: pillars rise throughout the building's foundation

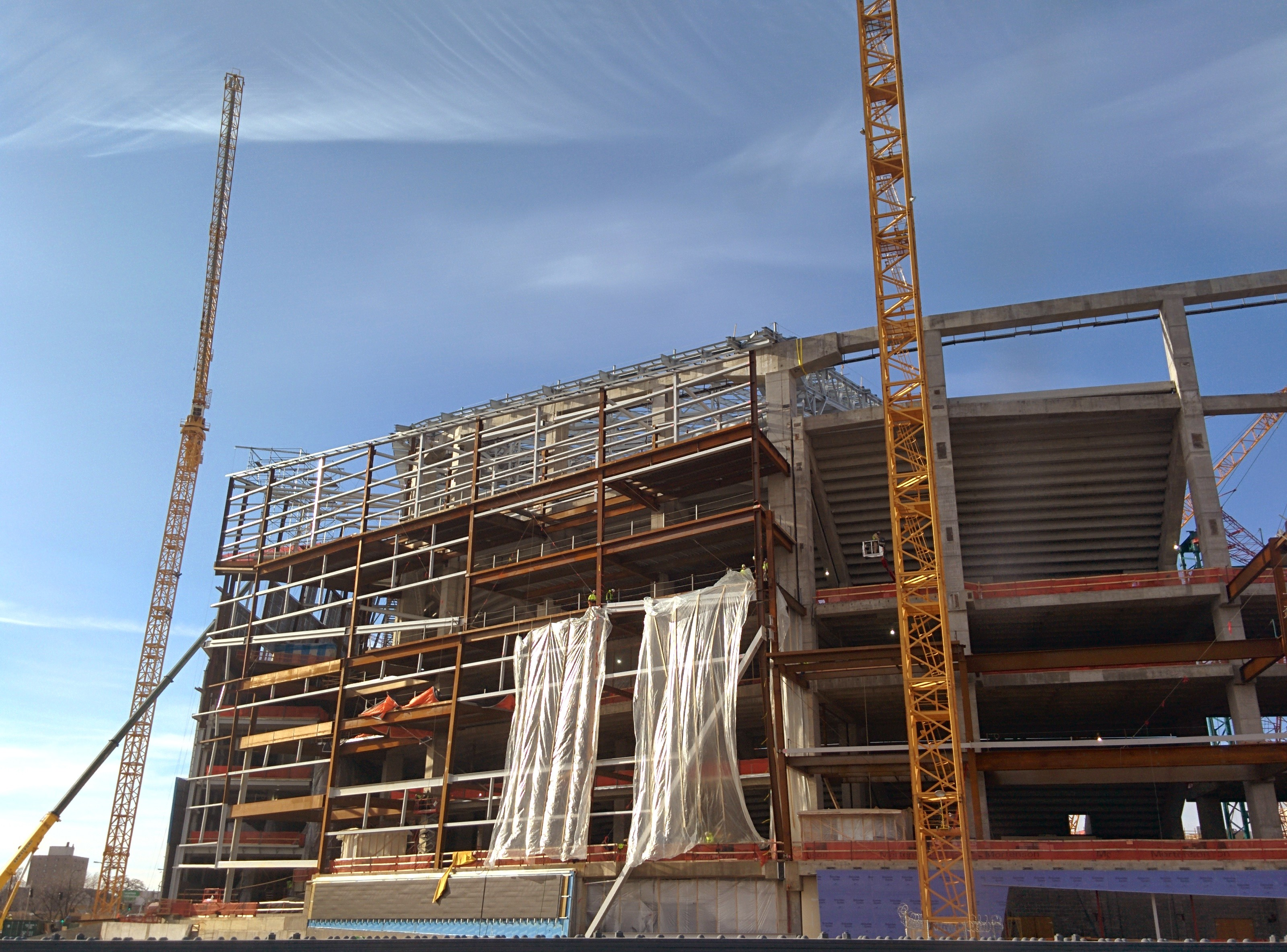
February 2, 2015: north facade of U.S. Bank Stadium under construction in Minneapolis, Minnesota

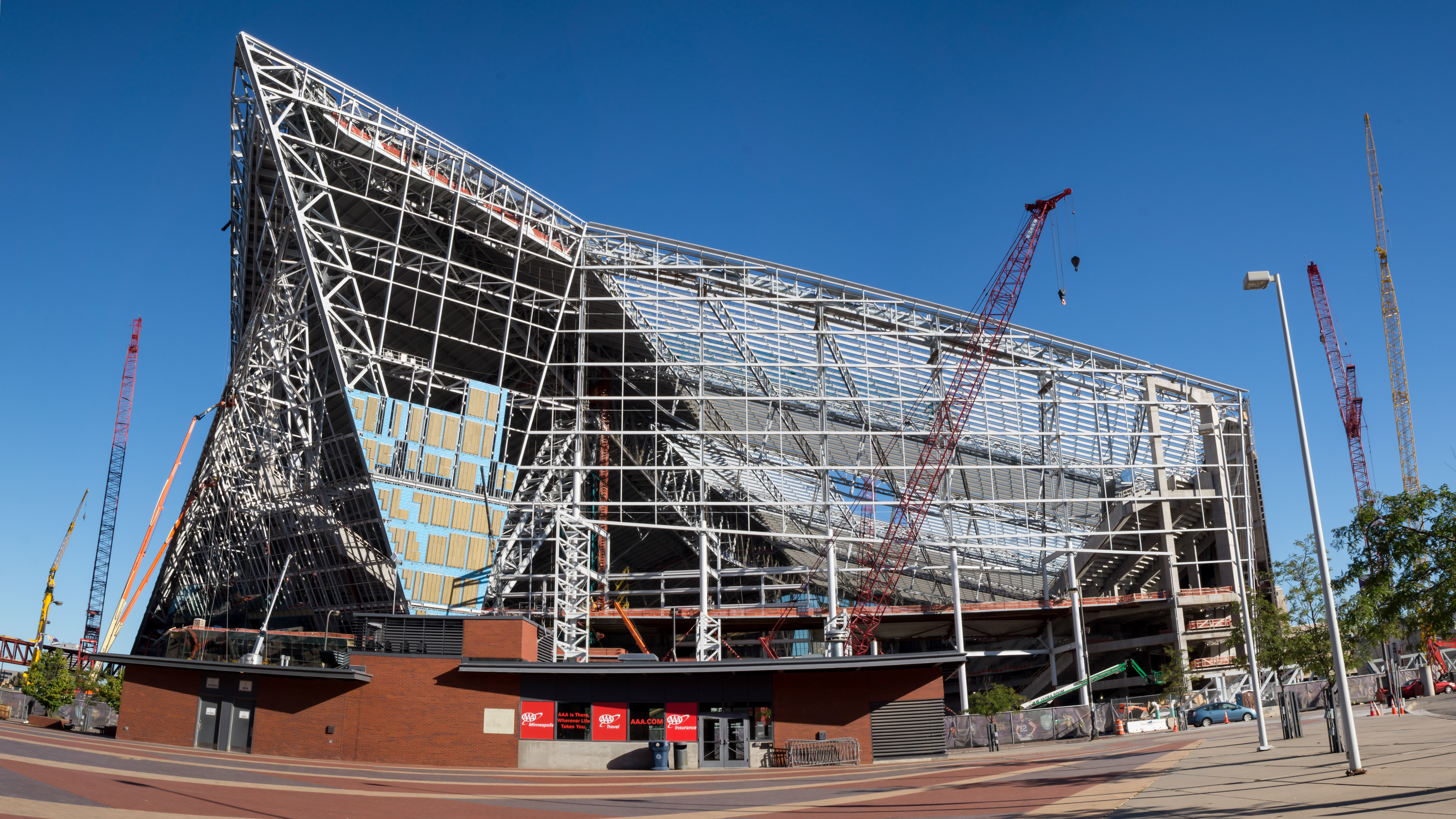
October 2, 2015: framing of the stadium

In August 2012, the Minnesota Sports Facilities Authority (MSFA)—the stadium's newly created owner—received bids and plans from five architectural and engineering firms, all nationally recognized stadium designers, including Populous, AECOM, EwingCole, and HNTB. On September 28, 2012, the MSFA selected the Dallas firm of HKS, Inc., which had designed both AT&T Stadium and Lucas Oil Stadium within the previous decade, to serve as the project's architect. HKS also designed Globe Life Park in Arlington, home of the Texas Rangers; the Milwaukee Brewers' American Family Field in Milwaukee, Wisconsin; and renovations to the Chicago White Sox's Guaranteed Rate Field. Initial design plans were not immediately released to the public, but Viking officials said they hoped the budget would allow the new stadium to include a retractable roof, walls, or windows. The design team also planned to incorporate interactive technology into some elements to create a more engaging fan experience.

Construction of the facility was originally slated to begin in October 2013, but was delayed until December 3, 2013, as an ongoing investigation of the Wilfs' finances continued to take place after a 21-year lawsuit against them came to a conclusion in late August. On August 27, 2015, one worker died and another was injured after falling during construction on the U.S. Bank Stadium roof. Jeramie M. Gruber, 35, of Northfield and the other injured worker were employed by St. Paul–based Berwald Roofing Co. which had been cited 6 times since 2010 for OSHA violations regarding improper fall protection for workers. The Occupational Safety and Health Administration (OSHA) investigated the incident. As a result of the investigation, contractor Mortenson Construction and subcontractor Berwald Roofing faced fines of $173,400 for "serious" and "willful" safety violations. The reports do not provide an explanation of the accidents, but the largest fine, $70,000, and most serious alleged violation faults Berwald for willfully failing to have workers use proper fall protection while working at heights above 6 feet.

On June 15, 2015, the Vikings announced that U.S. Bank had acquired the naming rights to the stadium. The naming deal is worth $220 million over 25 years.

== Major events ==
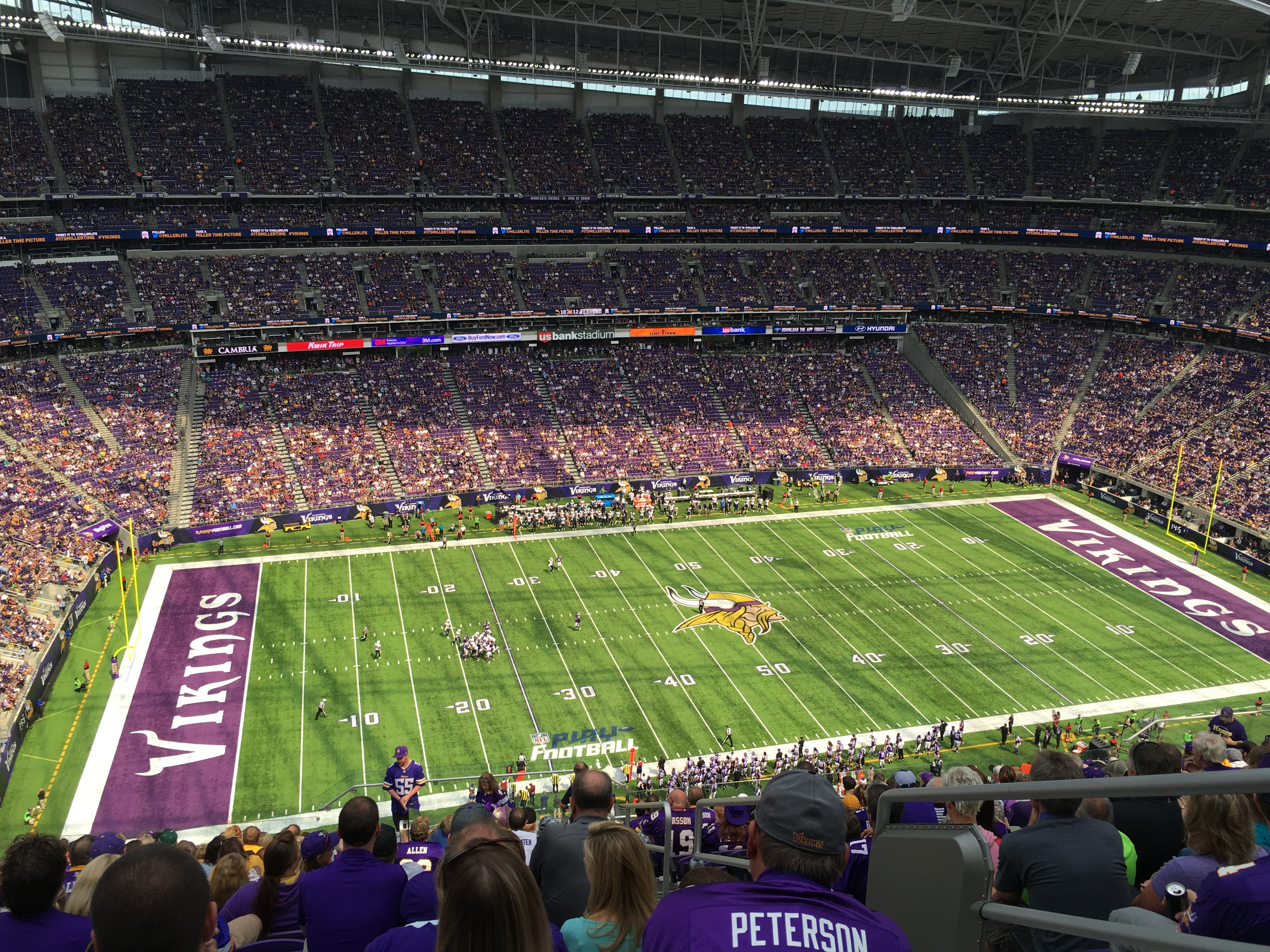
The Vikings hosting their first game at the stadium in 2016.

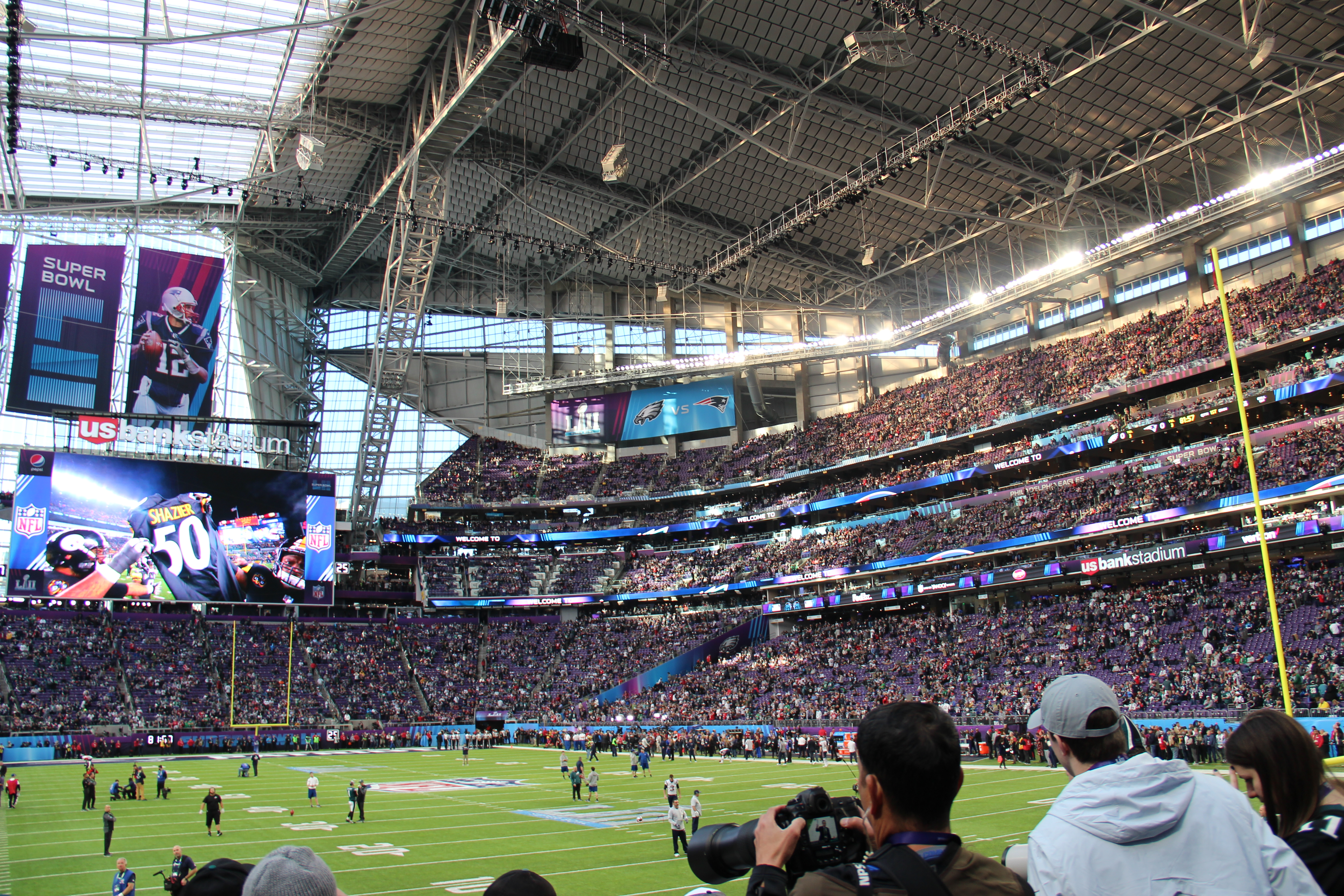
Inside U.S. Bank Stadium just before Super Bowl LII

=== National Football League ===
On May 20, 2014, the NFL awarded Minneapolis Super Bowl LII, beating bids by Indianapolis and New Orleans for the game. On November 14, 2014, the NCAA announced the stadium would host the men's basketball Final Four in 2019. In May 2015, Governor Mark Dayton announced a bid to host the College Football Playoff National Championship in 2020. However, on November 4, 2015, it was announced that the game was awarded to New Orleans. This was the first losing bid for a major sporting event offered to be held at the stadium. On July 20, 2016, it was announced that U.S. Bank Stadium and Minneapolis would host the 2017, 2018, and 2019 summer X Games. The stadium was going to host in 2020 as well but the event was canceled due to the COVID-19 pandemic.

The first NFL game at the stadium was the Week 3 preseason game against the San Diego Chargers on August 28, 2016. Although the Vikings scored first with a field goal, the Chargers scored the first touchdown in the new stadium. The Vikings ultimately won, 23–10.

The first NFL regular season win at the stadium was on September 18, 2016 by the Vikings against the Green Bay Packers by a score of 17–14. The AMA Supercross Championship hosts a round at U.S. Bank Stadium since 2017. The Metrodome had last hosted an AMA Supercross round in 2013.

U.S. Bank Stadium hosted its first playoff game, an NFC divisional game, on January 14, 2018, as the Vikings hosted the New Orleans Saints. The Vikings won the game 29–24 on a last second 61-yard catch by wide receiver Stefon Diggs, in a play that became known as the Minneapolis Miracle. The Vikings then advanced to the NFC Championship game against the Philadelphia Eagles in Philadelphia's Lincoln Financial Field, where the Vikings lost 38–7, costing the Vikings the chance to become the first NFL team to play a Super Bowl in its own home stadium.

Super Bowl LII was played at the stadium on February 4, 2018 between the Philadelphia Eagles and the New England Patriots with the Eagles winning 41–33 for their first Super Bowl win.

The Minnesota Vikings played the Detroit Lions in the Christmas Day game at U.S. Bank Stadium on December 25, 2025. Snoop Dogg headlined the special "Snoop's Holiday Halftime Party" alongside guest stars like Lainey Wilson, the stars of K-pop Demon Hunters, Martha Stewart, and classical singers Andrea and Matteo Bocelli.

=== Basketball ===
U.S. Bank Stadium hosted the Final Four of the 2019 NCAA Division I men's basketball tournament. The Virginia Cavaliers defeated the Texas Tech Red Raiders 85–77 to win their first NCAA basketball title.

=== Soccer ===
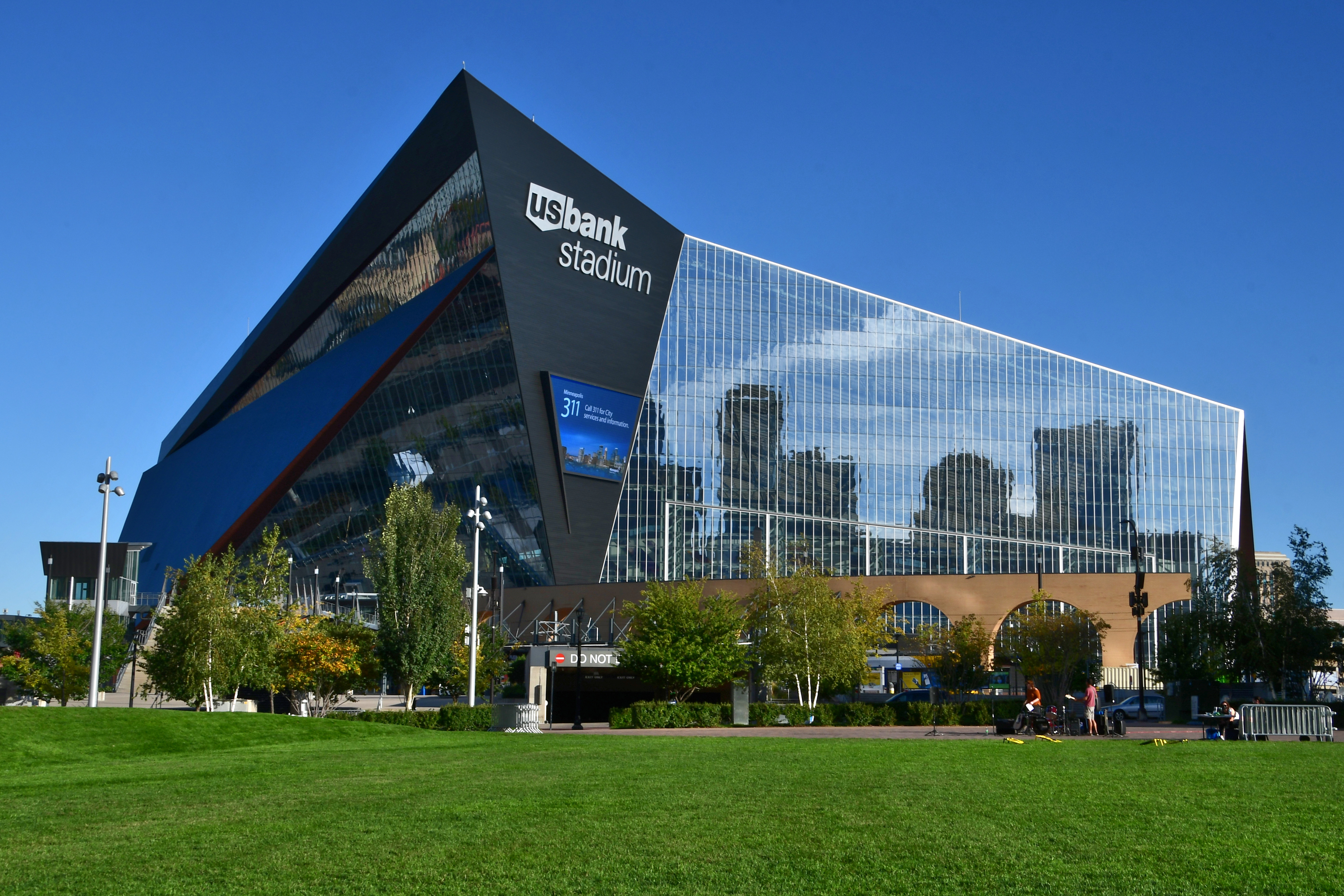
U.S. Bank Stadium in 2021, with the skyline of Minneapolis reflected in the stadium windows

The Vikings said the design includes a soccer field measuring 115 by 74 yards to accommodate a potential Major League Soccer expansion team. In 2012, the Vikings received a five-year window to host a Major League Soccer team in the state's legislation to finance the stadium, and the Vikings ownership launched a bid to own an expansion franchise. In December 2014, Vikings Vice President Lester Bagley presented rendering of the stadium configured for a potential Major League Soccer team, with tarps and curtains covering the upper deck to bring the capacity down to 20,000. He said the stadium was "being built specifically with soccer in mind" and drew a contrast with Gillette Stadium, New England Revolution's home field, which he called "a football stadium".

On March 16, 2015, the Vikings announced they ended their expansion bid after MLS informed them that they preferred the bid by Minnesota United with its own plan for a smaller, outdoor stadium in Saint Paul, Allianz Field.

The first soccer match at U.S. Bank Stadium was between AC Milan and Chelsea on August 3, 2016, as part of the 2016 International Champions Cup.

On October 23, 2016, the United States women's national soccer team played an international friendly against Switzerland, winning 5–1.

Date	Winning team	Result	Losing team	Tournament	Spectators
August 3, 2016	(England) Chelsea	3–1	(Italy) AC Milan	2016 International Champions Cup	64,101
October 23, 2016	United States	5–1	Switzerland	Women's International Friendly	23,400
July 31, 2018	(England) Tottenham Hotspur	1–0	(Italy) AC Milan	2018 International Champions Cup	31,264
June 29, 2025	Guatemala	1–1 (6–5 pen.)	Canada	2025 CONCACAF Gold Cup Quarterfinals	32,289
June 29, 2025	United States	2–2 (4–3 pen.)	Costa Rica	2025 CONCACAF Gold Cup Quarterfinals	32,289

=== Baseball ===
Field dimensions for college baseball

As with the Metrodome, U.S. Bank Stadium has the capability to host baseball games in the winter months. The University of Minnesota plays selected games, primarily during February and March, including hosting the College Classic, a non-conference series of games featuring top NCAA teams in Minnesota that was suspended during stadium construction.

The stadium's first baseball game was between Century College and Iowa Central on February 24, 2017. The University of Minnesota was scheduled to play the first baseball game at the new stadium, but converting it from Supercross to baseball took stadium officials longer than projected. Minnesota ended up playing Seattle University later on that same day as the third game at the stadium, first indoor home game for the university since the Metrodome.

Currently, the Golden Gophers play up to 15 home games per season at U.S. Bank Stadium, and do not play home games on campus until April.

=== College football ===
The first college football game in the stadium was played on September 2, 2023, between North Dakota State and Eastern Washington. The Bison defeated the Eagles, 35–10, in front of 22,546 spectators.

A college football game between St. Thomas and Saint John's that was scheduled for November 7, 2020 and was announced in February 2020 was canceled because of the COVID-19 pandemic.

Date	Winning team	Losing team	Final Score	Spectators
September 2, 2023	North Dakota State	Eastern Washington	35–10	22,546

=== Professional wrestling ===
On August 1 and 2, 2026, U.S. Bank Stadium hosted the 2026 edition of WWE's SummerSlam Premium Live Event.

=== Concerts ===
As part of the opening weekend festivities for the stadium, two concerts were held: country artist Luke Bryan on August 19, 2016, and heavy metal band Metallica performing the following night, August 20. Prince, a Minneapolis native, was in preliminary talks to perform the first concert at the new stadium in August 2016, but he died on April 21.

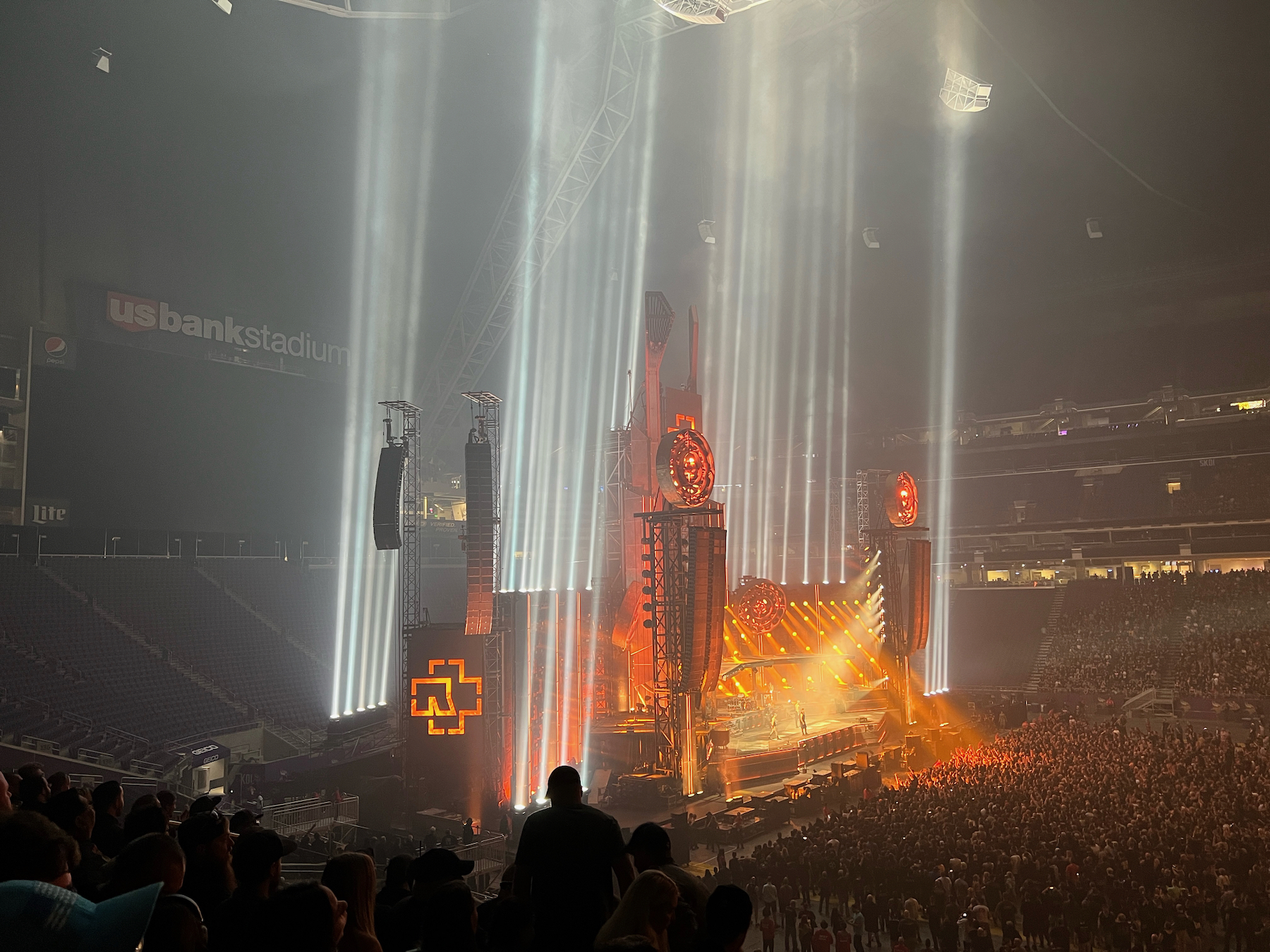
Rammstein performs at US Bank Stadium on August 27, 2022

While the stadium has seen significant use for concerts, the stadium has become notorious for its sound quality. In 2025, Minnesota Star Tribune music critics Jon Bream and Chris Riemenschneider ranked U.S. Bank Stadium in the bottom 5 in their ranking of 53 Twin Cities concert venues, noting "unless you’ve shelled out big bucks to sit within 20 yards or so of the stage, the sound bounces all over this massive domed stadium, making it nearly impossible to comprehend lyrics (unless you’ve got them memorized)."

Performances at the stadium have included Justin Timberlake during the Super Bowl halftime show, Prince's band The Revolution who performed outside the stadium, rock group A Day to Remember at the X-Games, Flo Rida, Snoop Dogg along with special guests at the 2025 Christmas Half Time Show, and more.

The below list does not reflect every concert to have taken place at the stadium, but does capture some of the most noteworthy.

Date	Artist	Opening act(s)	Tour / concert	Attendance	Revenue	Notes
August 19, 2016	Luke Bryan	Little Big Town; Dustin Lynch	Kill the Lights Tour	47,219 / 47,219	$4,565,264	First concert at the stadium
August 20, 2016	Metallica	Volbeat; Avenged Sevenfold	WorldWired Tour	48,492 / 48,492	$5,158,790	Followed Luke Bryan the next day
July 30, 2017	Guns N' Roses	Deftones	Not in This Lifetime... Tour	48,740 / 48,740	$5,567,052	First time that original band members Axl Rose, Slash and Duff McKagan played in Minnesota together since 1992.
August 12, 2017	Coldplay	AlunaGeorge; Izzy Bizu	A Head Full of Dreams Tour	47,472 / 47,472	$4,325,230	
September 8, 2017	U2	Beck	The Joshua Tree Tour 2017	43,386 / 43,386	$4,698,100	
May 5, 2018	Kenny Chesney	Thomas Rhett; Old Dominion; Brandon Lay	Trip Around the Sun Tour	48,255 / 48,255	$4,999,184	
May 18, 2018	Lecrae; Hillsong	Tye Tribbett; Jabbawockeez; Nick Hall	Pulse Twin Cities		Free Concert	
August 8, 2018	Beyoncé; Jay-Z	Chloe X Halle	On the Run II Tour	32,851 / 32,851	$3,627,417	
August 31, 2018	Taylor Swift	Camila Cabello; Charli XCX	Taylor Swift's Reputation Stadium Tour	98,774 / 98,774	$10,242,024	Mark Dayton, Governor of Minnesota (2011–2019), declared August 31, 2018, as "Taylor Swift Day" in the state, honoring Swift's two consecutive dates at the venue.
September 1, 2018	Taylor Swift	Camila Cabello; Charli XCX	Taylor Swift's Reputation Stadium Tour	98,774 / 98,774	$10,242,024	Mark Dayton, Governor of Minnesota (2011–2019), declared August 31, 2018, as "Taylor Swift Day" in the state, honoring Swift's two consecutive dates at the venue.
October 20, 2018	Ed Sheeran	Snow Patrol; Lauv	÷ Tour	49,359 / 49,359	$4,512,422	
May 3, 2019	Garth Brooks	King Calaway	The Garth Brooks Stadium Tour		$11,718,000	This is the highest attended event at the stadium at that point.
May 4, 2019	Garth Brooks	Darius Rucker	The Garth Brooks Stadium Tour		$11,718,000	This is the highest attended event at the stadium at that point.
July 11, 2019	Toby Mac		The LCMS Youth Gathering			
October 24, 2021	The Rolling Stones	Black Pumas	No Filter Tour	38,727 / 38,727	$8,039,757	
November 13, 2021	George Strait	Chris Stapleton; Little Big Town	Strait Summer	—	—	
June 11, 2022	Eric Church	Morgan Wallen; Ernest	One Hell Of a Night			
August 6, 2022	Kenny Chesney	Dan + Shay; Old Dominion; Carly Pearce	Here and Now Tour	50,150 / 50,150	$5,996,445	
August 14, 2022	Def Leppard; Mötley Crüe	Poison; Joan Jett & The Blackhearts; Classless Act	The Stadium Tour	42,212 / 42,212	$5,884,144	
August 27, 2022	Rammstein	Duo Abélard	Rammstein Stadium Tour	36,078 / 36,385	$6,909,298	
April 8, 2023	Red Hot Chili Peppers	King Princess, The Strokes	Red Hot Chili Peppers 2022–2024 Global Stadium Tour	–	–	
May 13, 2023	Luke Combs	Brent Cobb, Lainey Wilson, Riley Green, Flatland Cavalry	Luke Combs World Tour 2023	–	–	
June 23, 2023	Taylor Swift	Girl in Red; Gracie Abrams	The Eras Tour	—	—	
June 24, 2023	Taylor Swift	Girl in Red; Owenn	The Eras Tour	—	—	
August 12, 2023	Ed Sheeran	Khalid; Cat Burns	+–=÷× Tour	70,000+	–	
September 27, 2023	Kelly Clarkson				Ecolab Corporate Event	
November 10, 2023	Billy Joel and Stevie Nicks		Two Icons, One Night	50,000+		
April 6, 2024	Chris Stapleton	Lainey Wilson and Marcus King	All American Road Show			
May 4, 2024	Kenny Chesney; Zac Brown Band	Megan Moroney; Uncle Kracker	Sun Goes Down 2024 Tour			
June 20, 2024	Morgan Wallen	Bailey Zimmerman; Nate Smith; Bryan Martin	One Night at a Time World Tour	—	—	
June 21, 2024	Morgan Wallen	Bailey Zimmerman; Nate Smith; Bryan Martin	One Night at a Time World Tour	—	—	
August 16, 2024	Metallica	Pantera; Mammoth WVH	M72 World Tour	107,474 / 107,474	$12,014,211	
August 18, 2024	Metallica	Five Finger Death Punch; Ice Nine Kills	M72 World Tour	107,474 / 107,474	$12,014,211	
August 24, 2024	Zach Bryan	Turnpike Troubadours	Quitting Time			
April 10, 2025	AC/DC	The Pretty Reckless	Power Up Tour	46,176 / 46,176	$6,524,900	
April 19, 2025	Kendrick Lamar; SZA	Mustard	Grand National Tour	47,354 / 47,354	$9,124,989	
May 20, 2025	Post Malone	Jelly Roll, Sierra Ferrell	The Big Ass Stadium Tour			
June 14, 2025	The Weeknd	Playboi Carti; Mike Dean	After Hours til Dawn Tour			
October 17, 2025	Paul McCartney	N/A	Got Back Tour			
April 10, 2026	Morgan Wallen	Thomas Rhett; Gavin Adcock; Vincent Mason	Still The Problem Tour			
April 11, 2026	Morgan Wallen	Hardy; Gavin Adcock; Vincent Mason	Still The Problem Tour			
May 13, 2026	Bruno Mars	DJ Pee .Wee; Leon Thomas	The Romantic Tour			
June 30, 2026	Usher; Chris Brown		The R&B Tour			
August 15, 2026	Ed Sheeran	Myles Smith; Lukas Graham; Ellie Banke	Loop Tour			
April 28, 2027	Zach Bryan	John Fogerty; Fey Fili	Young Manhood and Other Donatable Organs Tour			

=== Religious events ===
The 2019 LCMS Youth Gathering took place July 11–15, 2019 at several downtown Minneapolis venues, including U.S. Bank Stadium. The 2021 ELCA Youth Gathering was scheduled to be held at the stadium from June 29 to July 3 but due to COVID-19 it was postponed to July 24–28, 2022 before it was canceled altogether.

== See also ==
- List of American football stadiums by capacity
- Lists of stadiums

Preceded by TCF Bank Stadium	Home of the Minnesota Vikings; 2016–present	Succeeded by none
Preceded by Circuit of the Americas; Austin, Texas	Host of Summer X-Games; 2017–2019	Succeeded by Southern California
Preceded by NRG Stadium	Host of Super Bowl LII; 2018	Succeeded by Mercedes-Benz Stadium
Preceded by Alamodome	NCAA Men's Division I Basketball Tournament; Finals Venue; 2019	Succeeded by Lucas Oil Stadium
