= Whittlesey House (Albuquerque, New Mexico) =

House in Albuquerque, New Mexico

- U.S. Historic district – Contributing property
- NM State Register of Cultural Properties
- Albuquerque Historic Landmark
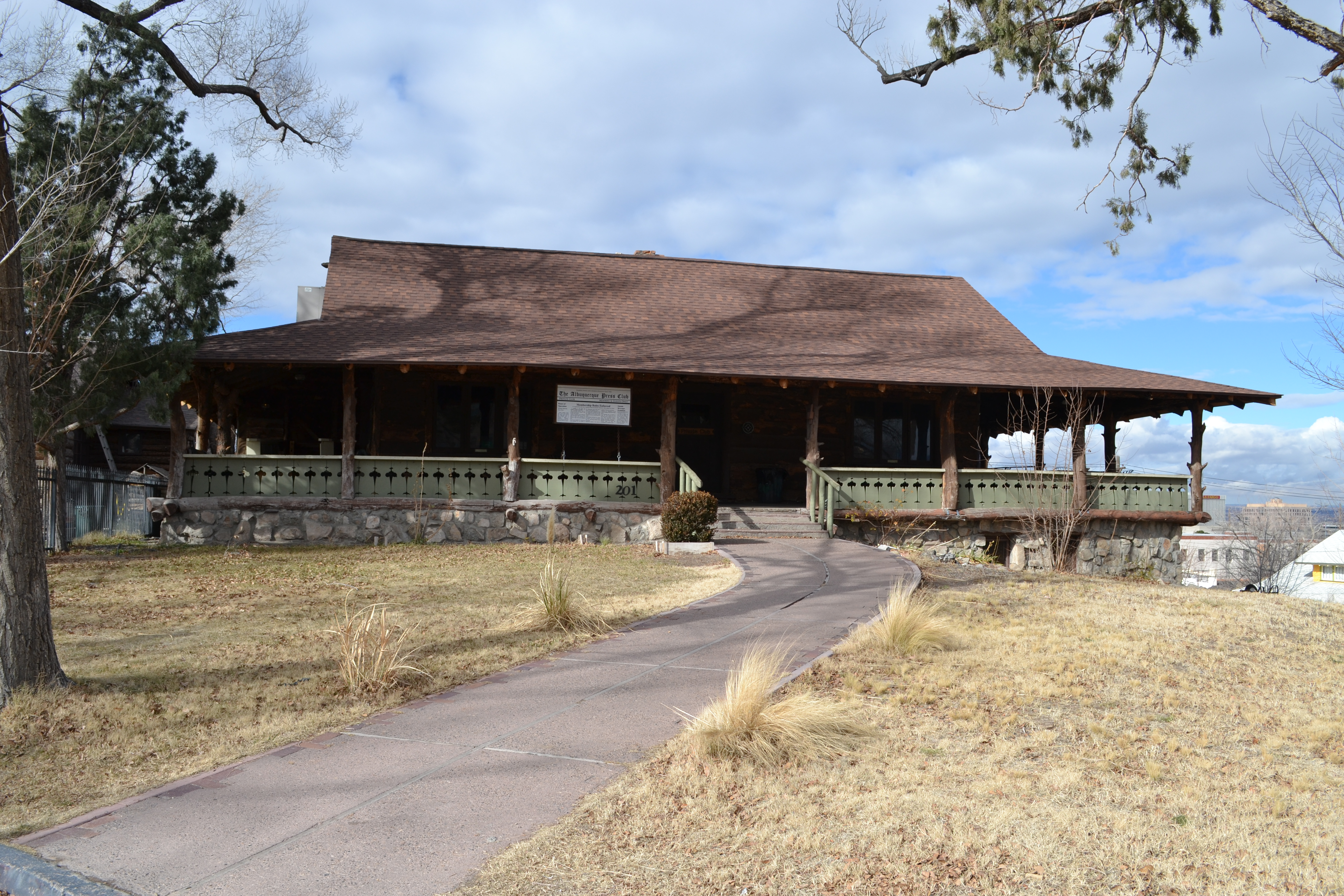
- The house in 2017

- Location within New Mexico Location within the United States
- Location: 201 Highland Park Cir. SE; Albuquerque, New Mexico
- Coordinates: 35°4′54″N 106°38′21″W
- Built: 1903
- Architect: Charles Frederick Whittlesey
- Architectural style: Norwegian Vernacular
- Part of: Huning Highlands Historic District (ID78001804)
- NMSRCP No.: 391

Significant dates
- Designated CP: November 17, 1978
- Designated NMSRCP: June 20, 1975
- Designated ALBHL: October 1, 1979

The Whittlesey House is a historic house in the Huning Highlands neighborhood of Albuquerque, New Mexico. It was built in 1903 by architect Charles Frederick Whittlesey, who briefly lived there with his family, and currently houses the Albuquerque Press Club. The building is a rustic, three-story log and stone structure based on Norwegian Vernacular architecture, which is highly unusual for New Mexico.

It was added to the New Mexico State Register of Cultural Properties in 1975 and was listed on the National Register of Historic Places as a contributing property in the Huning Highlands Historic District in 1978. In 1979, it was designated an Albuquerque city landmark.

== History ==
The house was designed and built by Charles Frederick Whittlesey, who was in Albuquerque working on the Alvarado Hotel. It was originally intended to be a communal residence for the clerks and draftsmen at his architectural office and was named "Bungalow Barracks" with this in mind. Describing the planned house in 1902, the Albuquerque Journal wrote

There will be six comfortable bed rooms and a large modern bath room, accommodating twelve men, each fellow rooming with his particular chum. On the lower floor will be the dining room, pantries and kitchen... Here they will live royally as becometh jolly bachelorhood and the fellow who may be their guest of an evening may consider himself a lucky dog.

Whittlesey bought land for the project at the edge of the city, near the high point of the Huning Highlands neighborhood, in December, 1902. By the following July, the house was reported to be nearly finished. The house was of log construction and built in the style of a Norwegian villa. Whittlesey briefly lived there with his family, but was frequently away supervising construction of various projects. By 1908, he had sold the property and was living in California.

From 1920 to 1960, the house was the residence of Clifford Hall McCallum, a business owner and socialite who entertained prominent guests including William Randolph Lovelace II, Clinton Anderson, and Clyde Tingley there. She also converted the stable and parts of the house into rental units for extra income. In 1960, Lambda Chi Alpha purchased the building for use as a fraternity house. Since 1973, it has housed the Albuquerque Press Club, a private social club originally catering to local journalists.

== Architecture ==
The Whittlesey House is a three-story, split-level log building on a stone foundation. It is built into a hillside with a 10-foot (3.0 m) wide veranda, supported by rough-hewn logs, surrounding three sides at the second-floor level. The main part of the house is two stories with a wide Dutch gable roof, while the rear wing extends to three stories. Susan DeWitt described the building as "an enormously sophisticated log cabin". Whittlesey based the design on a Norwegian villa, with many rustic details. The Albuquerque Journal wrote in 1903:

The barracks is even more attractive than the plans would have indicated. There are no smooth boards in the place. It is all rough pine logs with the bark on and it is built with the fewest number of nails possible. Whenever it is possible the logs are put together with wooden bolts and there are all the picturesque features of the old time log cabin with a whole lot of the modern conveniences. For instance the fire place in the living room, made in the roughest possible style of the unhewn black rock from the lava bed over east, is reinforced by a very modern and well built steam heating plant so that one may have the picturesque without any of the usual discomforts of a frosted back. This living room is a marvel of light in spite of the low ceilings and deep windows. These windows face the four winds and command the best views of the valley that can be had. The dining room looks down over the town and the valley and the sleeping rooms are all light and airy. And around it all is a deep veranda, built of rough logs like the rest...

The main living room is on the same level as the veranda and is 60 feet (18 m) long, with a large fireplace built from black volcanic rock. According to an Albuquerque Journal article from 1994,

Inside, the building is something of a maze, with rooms splitting off a central hall and short stairways that twist their way upward. One hall downstairs jogs off obliquely to the rest of the rooms. The top floor features low doorways, dormer windows and a pitched ceiling.
