= Highland Hotel =

Building in Albuquerque, New Mexico

- U.S. Historic district – Contributing property
- Albuquerque Historic Landmark
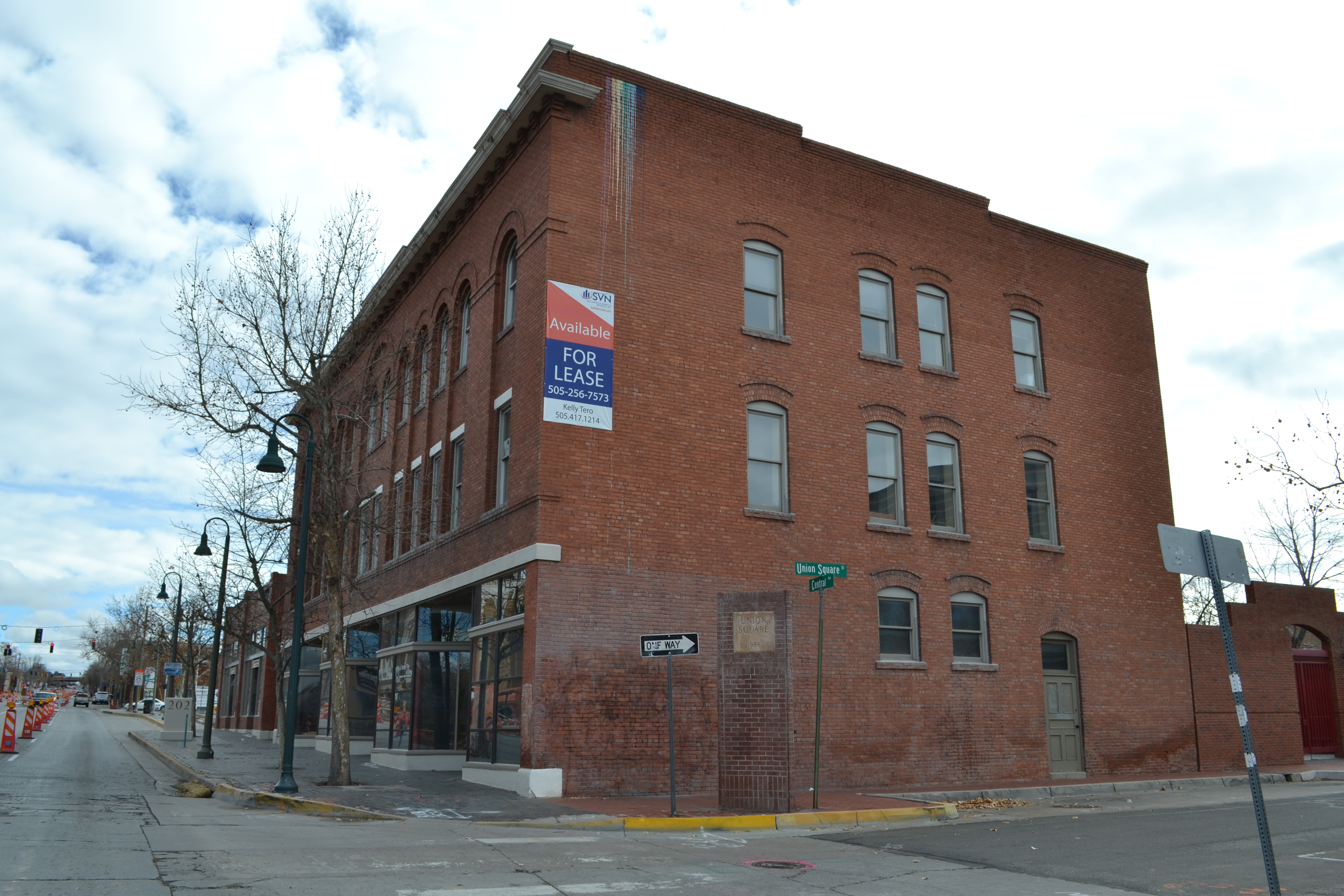
- The building in 2017

- Location within New Mexico Location within the United States
- Location: 200-206 Central Ave. SE; Albuquerque, New Mexico
- Coordinates: 35°5′1″N 106°38′44″W
- Built: 1906
- Architect: Francis W. Spencer
- Architectural style: Chicago School
- Part of: Huning Highlands Historic District (ID78001804)

The Highland Hotel, also known as the Hudson Hotel, is a historic hotel building in the Huning Highlands neighborhood of Albuquerque, New Mexico. It was built in 1906 and operated as a hotel until the 1970s. The building was restored and converted to office space in 1983–84. It is notable as one of the few surviving examples of early-20th-century Commercial Style architecture in the city, which was once common.

It was listed on the National Register of Historic Places as a contributing property in the Huning Highlands Historic District in 1978 and has been designated an Albuquerque historic landmark.

== History ==
The Highland Hotel was built in 1906 by Joshua Raynolds, replacing an earlier hotel of the same name that burned down in 1903. The Albuquerque Citizen reported in November 1905,

After two years of idleness, the vacant lots at the corner of Railroad avenue and John street, at present occupied by the repulsive ruins of the burned Highland hotel, are to be beautified by the erection of a three-story business block. The new building is to be brick and stone, and the contract has been let to J. W. McQuade. The work of building is to be commenced at once.

Raynolds also built the neighboring Occidental Life Insurance Building, which was demolished in 1978. The two buildings were stylistically similar but the Occidental Building was one story taller.

The new Highland Hotel had commercial storefronts on the first floor, and hotel rooms on the second and third floors. It was renamed the Hudson Hotel in 1922 and remained in operation under that name as late as 1976. By the 1980s, the building was vacant and infested with bats. In 1983-84, the hotel was restored and converted to office space as part of the Union Square redevelopment. The project was completed by Hutchinson, Brown & Partners.

== Architecture ==
The Highland Hotel is a three-story brick building exhibiting relatively simple Chicago School or Commercial style architecture. It has a symmetrical 12-bay front elevation, with each bay topped by a Romanesque arch except for the two central bays, which share a single, larger arch. The second and third floors are separated by recessed spandrels and the ground floor has a symmetrical glass storefront with three entrances. The building is topped by a cornice and parapet with modest ornamental brickwork.
