= Old Albuquerque High School =

High School in Albuquerque, New Mexico

- U.S. Historic district – Contributing property
- NM State Register of Cultural Properties
- Albuquerque Historic Landmark
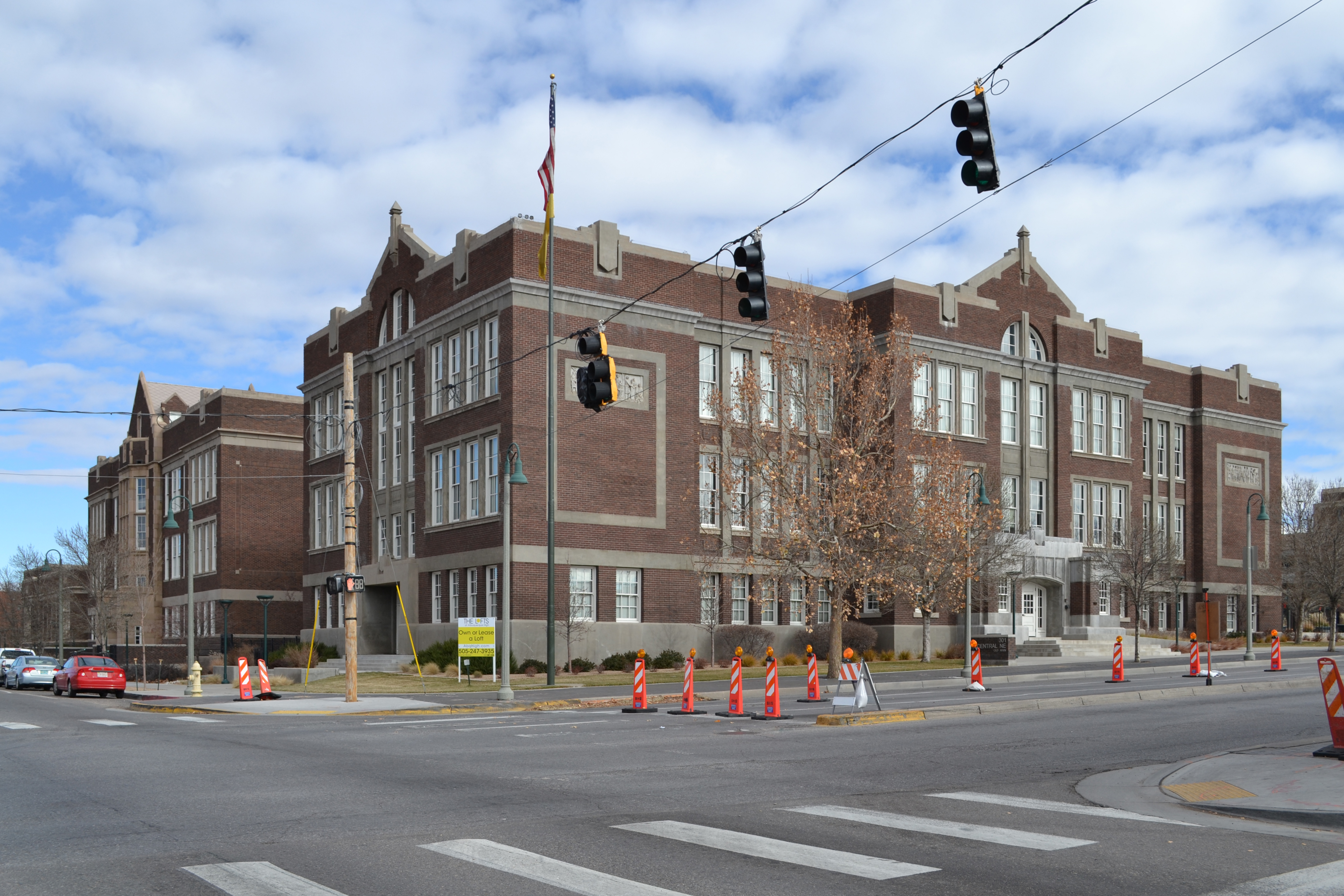
- Old Albuquerque High School in 2017

- Location within New Mexico Location within the United States
- Location: Central Ave. and Broadway Blvd., Albuquerque, New Mexico
- Coordinates: 35°5′2″N 106°38′38″W
- Built: 1914–1940
- Architect: Trost & Trost, George M. Williamson, Louis Hesselden
- Architectural style: Collegiate Gothic
- Part of: Huning Highlands Historic District (ID78001804)
- NMSRCP No.: 508
- Designated NMSRCP: June 3, 1977

The Old Albuquerque High School is the historic former campus of Albuquerque High School in Albuquerque, New Mexico. It is located in the Huning Highlands neighborhood and is protected by the city as a historic landmark. It is located on the northeast corner of Central and Broadway NE, at the center of an area that has become known as East Downtown or EDo. The campus comprises five buildings, the oldest of which was built in 1914. After the school moved to a new location in 1974, the old buildings were left abandoned for decades before being renovated as loft apartments in the early 21st century. Old Albuquerque High was added to the New Mexico State Register of Cultural Properties in 1977.

== Buildings ==
The Old Albuquerque High campus comprises five buildings grouped around a central courtyard. All of the buildings were designed in the Gothic Revival style typical of early 20th-century school architecture.

Old Main is the original building, constructed in 1914. It is located on the southeast corner of the campus, facing Central Avenue. The three-story building was designed by Henry C. Trost and originally housed classrooms, a gymnasium, a library, an auditorium, and a science laboratory.

The Manual Arts Building was built in 1927 on the east side of campus, facing Arno Street. It has three stories and 27,000 square feet (2,500 m^{2}) of floor area, and originally housed a woodshop and machine shop in addition to classrooms. It was designed by local architect George M. Williamson.

The Classroom Building (1937), Gymnasium (1938), and Library (1940) were all designed by Louis Hesselden and built with New Deal funding and Works Progress Administration labor. The Gymnasium, which sits at the north end of the campus, is the largest building with 68,000 square feet (6,300 m^{2}) of floor area. The Classroom Building and the Library face Broadway on the west side of campus.

== History ==
Old Main was built in 1914, replacing Albuquerque High's previous location in the Central School building downtown. At the time Albuquerque had only 12,000 residents, and critics complained that the new building was too large and would never reach its capacity of 500 students. This proved not to be the case as a second building was required just 13 years later, and the campus had grown to five buildings by 1940. Albuquerque High remained the only high school in the city until Highland High School opened in 1949.

In 1974, Albuquerque High School moved to a new location about one mile (1.6 km) to the north, leaving the old campus vacant. Albuquerque Public Schools eventually sold the buildings, and they were left to deteriorate over the next 25 years as various plans to reuse them fell through and the surrounding neighborhood became increasingly blighted.

== Redevelopment ==
Efforts to renovate the former high school intensified in 1989 when the Albuquerque City Council authorized funds to purchase the property. In 1996, after years of legal wrangling, the city succeeded in acquiring four of the five campus buildings for $1.5 million. The city eventually settled on a plan to convert the buildings into loft apartments in a joint venture with a private developer, and work began in 2001. The Classroom Building and Old Main were the first to be renovated, followed by the Gymnasium, Library, and finally the separately-owned Manual Arts Building. The renovation preserved many interior details such as doors, handrails, and even blackboards. The gymnasium and library reading room are protected spaces and have also been preserved.

The success of the project spurred further revitalization efforts in the surrounding area, leading the city to draft an East Downtown master plan in 2005 to guide future development.
