= San Jose, Albuquerque =

San Jose
- Neighborhood of Albuquerque
- Interactive map of San Jose
- Coordinates: 35°03′25″N 106°38′42″W

Government
  - City Council: Isaac Benton
  - State House: G. Andrés Romero (D)
  - State Senate: Jerry Ortiz y Pino (D); Michael Padilla (D)
  - U.S. House: Deb Haaland (D)

Area
  - Total: 0.8 sq mi (2.1 km^{2})

Population (2010)
  - Total: 2,494
  - Density: 3,147/sq mi (1,215/km^{2})
- ZIP Code: 87102
- Area code: 505
- GNIS feature ID: 920836

San Jose is a neighborhood in southern Albuquerque, New Mexico. It was originally a separate village but was absorbed into the city in the 20th century. San Jose was first settled as a Hispanic farming community in the mid-1800s but transitioned to a working-class urban neighborhood after the arrival of the railroad in 1880. The neighborhood includes a mix of residential and industrial properties with a commercial district centered on Broadway Boulevard.

== Geography ==
According to the City of Albuquerque Planning Department, the boundaries of the neighborhood are the Burlington Northern Santa Fe railroad tracks to the west, Gibson Boulevard, Broadway Boulevard, and Kathryn Avenue to the north, Interstate 25 to the east, and Woodward Road to the south. Adjacent neighborhoods include Barelas to the west, South Broadway to the north, the Kirtland Addition to the east, and Mountain View (part of the unincorporated South Valley) to the south.

== Demographics ==
The 2010 United States census recorded a population in San Jose of approximately 2,494 residents. The racial breakdown of the neighborhood was 91% Hispanic, 5% non-Hispanic white, 2% American Indian, and 2% Black.

== History ==
San Jose was probably first settled around the same time the Barelas Ditch was constructed in the 1830s. It was originally a Hispanic farming village whose residents grew corn, fruit, and alfalfa on narrow plots perpendicular to the ditch. After the railroad reached Albuquerque in 1880, the community shifted toward more urban and industrial land use, with many residents employed by the Santa Fe Railway Shops. The existing farmland was subdivided into residential lots, resulting in a somewhat chaotic street pattern similar to other older neighborhoods in the city. The main street of the community at this time was William Street, but it later shifted to Broadway Boulevard (NM 47).

After the decline of the railroad industry, the area saw population loss and increased poverty. The large number of active and former industrial sites in San Jose and the adjacent Mountain View area also posed public health issues including groundwater contamination. Part of the neighborhood was listed as New Mexico's first Superfund site in 1983.

== Education ==
San Jose is served by Albuquerque Public Schools. Public school students from the neighborhood attend East San Jose Elementary School, Washington Middle School, and Albuquerque High School.

== Transportation ==
The main thoroughfare in San Jose is Broadway Boulevard (NM 47), which runs through the neighborhood from north to south. The neighborhood also has access to Interstate 25 immediately to the east.

Public bus transit in San Jose is provided by ABQ RIDE's 16 Broadway-University-Gibson route.
