= Huning Highlands =

- Neighborhood of Albuquerque
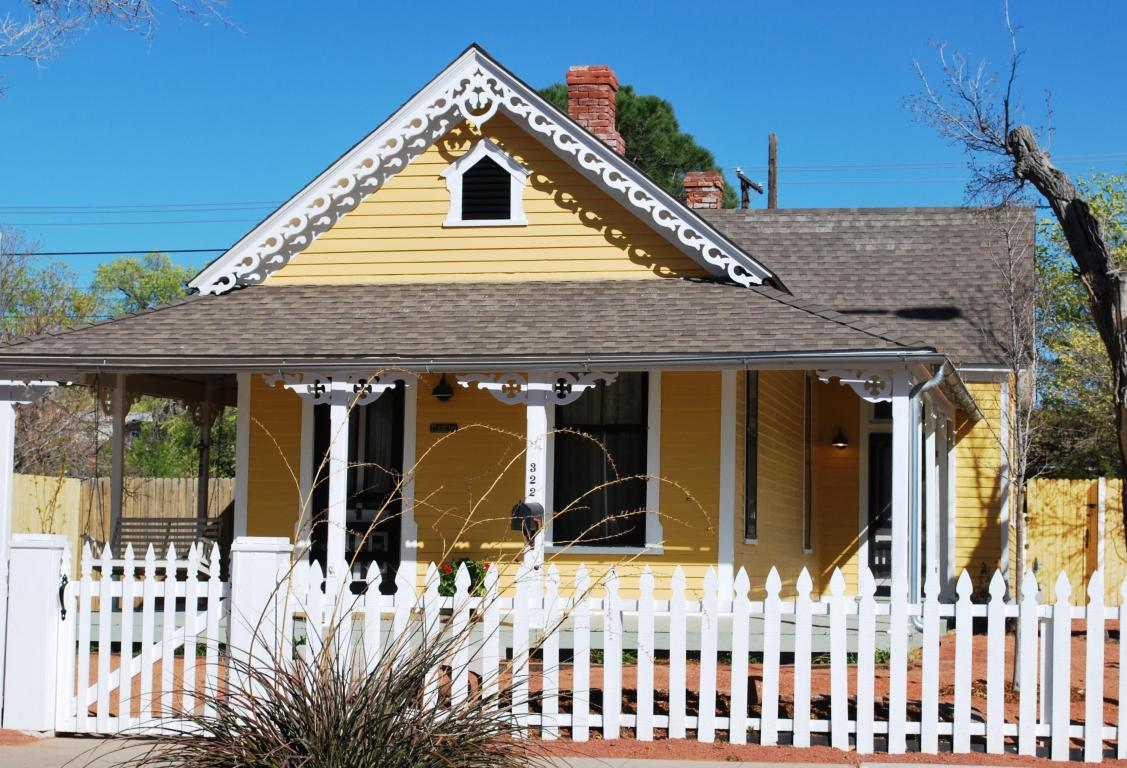
- The Seth House
- Interactive map of Huning Highlands
- Coordinates: 35°04′59″N 106°38′28″W

Government
  - City Council: Isaac Benton
  - State House: Gail Chasey (D); Javier Martínez (D)
  - State Senate: Jerry Ortiz y Pino (D)
  - U.S. House: Deb Haaland (D)

Area
  - Total: 0.21 sq mi (0.54 km^{2})

Population (2010)
  - Total: 1,047
  - Density: 5,038/sq mi (1,945/km^{2})
- ZIP Code: 87102
- Area code: 505

Huning Highlands, also known as EDo or East Downtown, is an inner-city neighborhood in Albuquerque, New Mexico, directly east of Downtown. It is a mostly residential area known for its high concentration of Victorian and early 20th-century houses and is listed on the National Register of Historic Places as the Huning Highlands Historic District. There is also a commercial district along the main thoroughfares, Central Avenue (former U.S. Route 66) and Broadway Boulevard. Huning Highlands was developed starting in 1880 and is named for Franz Huning, a prominent businessman at the time.

== Geography ==
The generally accepted boundaries of the neighborhood are Dr. Martin Luther King Jr. Avenue to the north, Locust Street to the east, Coal Avenue to the south, and the Burlington Northern Santa Fe railroad tracks to the west. The historic district boundaries extend an additional block south to Iron Avenue. Adjacent neighborhoods include Downtown to the west, Martineztown-Santa Barbara to the north, Sycamore to the east, and South Broadway to the south. The terrain consists of rising sand hills which increase in elevation from west to east.

== Demographics ==
The 2010 United States census recorded a population in Huning Highlands of approximately 1,047 residents. The racial breakdown of the neighborhood was 51% non-Hispanic white, 37% Hispanic, 4% American Indian, 3% Asian, 2% Black, and 3% other races or mixed-race.

== History ==
The Atchison, Topeka, and Santa Fe Railway reached Albuquerque in 1880, fueling land speculation as investors hoped to profit from its arrival. The New Mexico Town Company, formed by local businessmen Franz Huning, Elias S. Stover, and William Hazeldine, succeeded in attracting the railroad facilities to their chosen site about 1.5 miles (2.4 km) from the existing community at Old Town. The 3.1-square-mile (8.0 km^{2}) parcel they assembled quickly developed into the booming community of New Town—today's Downtown. Huning also owned land in the rolling sandhills further to the east, which was known as the Highlands due to its elevation. In 1880, the land was platted as the first subdivision to be added to the original townsite. This new neighborhood was named Huning's Highland Addition, which later shifted to Huning Highlands.

The neighborhood was laid out by civil engineer Walter G. Marmon, who named the main north-south streets Arno, after Franz Huning's son, Walter and Edith after his own son and daughter, and Broadway, because "every town should have a Broadway". The uppermost street of the gently sloping neighborhood was named High Street. The Highlands quickly became one of Albuquerque's most popular residential areas and was home to many of the city's prominent early residents. Unlike the old Hispanic neighborhoods like Old Town, Barelas, and Atrisco, Huning Highlands was primarily built by recently arrived Anglo-Americans and European immigrants. As such, the houses in the neighborhood reflected styles and materials popular in the eastern and Midwestern United States—Queen Anne, Italianate, and other Victorian styles—rather than traditional regional forms. Most of the houses were built using prefabricated trim and architectural elements in a mix-and-match approach not adhering to any particular style, though some are more cohesive.

The neighborhood continued to fill in between the 1880s and 1920s, by which time it was almost completely built up. Residents enjoyed amenities like Highland Park, one of the city's oldest public parks, the Old Main Library, and an electric streetcar line which went into service in 1911. However, as the city continued to grow, many wealthy residents abandoned the older inner-city neighborhoods in favor of the more suburban developments further to the east. By the 1970s, Huning Highlands had become a relatively poor neighborhood consisting largely of absentee-owned rental housing.

The Huning Highlands Historic District was added to the National Register of Historic Places in 1978 and in 1980, the Albuquerque City Council approved the city's first Historic Overlay Zone for the neighborhood. The city designation requires approval from the Landmarks and Urban Conservation Commission for any alterations to contributing properties in the district and provides tax incentives for home restoration projects. These actions had a positive effect on the neighborhood and led to many of the historic houses being restored. According to the Huning Highlands Historic District Association, the percentage of properties that were considered "blighted or substandard" decreased from 52% in 1976 to 17% in 1986 and was estimated at less than 5% by 2005. Development in the neighborhood's commercial district has also increased since the early 2000s, with large projects including the Albuquerque High Lofts and Innovate ABQ, a mixed-use tech campus.

== Education ==
Huning Highlands is served by Albuquerque Public Schools. Public school students from the neighborhood attend Longfellow or Eugene Field Elementary School, Jefferson Middle School, and Albuquerque High School.

== Transportation ==
The main east-west streets in Huning Highlands are Dr. Martin Luther King Jr. Boulevard, Central Avenue, and Lead and Coal Avenues, a pair of one-way arterials. The major north-south street is Broadway Boulevard. The neighborhood also has access to Interstate 25 immediately to the east.

Huning Highlands is served by the Albuquerque Rapid Transit Red and Green rapid bus lines via the EDo station. Local (non-express) bus service also operates on the following routes: 12 Constitution Commuter, 50 Airport-Downtown, and 92 Taylor Ranch Express on Martin Luther King; 66 Central on Central; 97 Zuni and 217 Downtown-KAFB Limited on Lead/Coal; and 16 Broadway-University-Gibson on Broadway. The major transit hub at Alvarado Transportation Center is just outside the neighborhood to the west.

== Places of interest ==
In addition to the National Register historic district, the neighborhood also includes one individually-listed NRHP property:

- Huning Highlands Conoco Service Station

There are also five properties that have been designated Albuquerque Historic Landmarks:

- AT&SF Memorial Hospital
- Highland Hotel
- Old Albuquerque High School
- Old Main Library (Albuquerque, New Mexico)
- Whittlesey House
