= Huning Highlands Historic District =

- U.S. National Register of Historic Places
- U.S. Historic district
- NM State Register of Cultural Properties
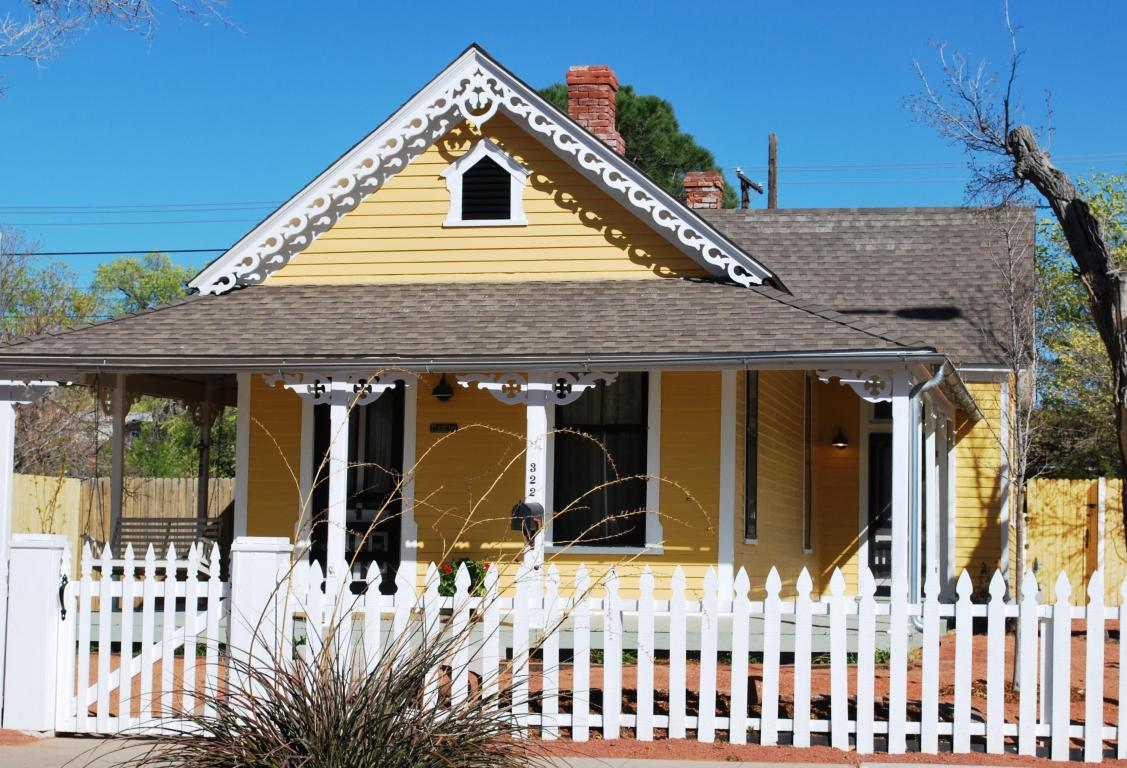
- The Seth House

- Location within New Mexico Location within the United States
- Location: Huning Highlands, Albuquerque, New Mexico
- Coordinates: 35°04′59″N 106°38′28″W
- NRHP reference No.: 78001804
- NMSRCP No.: 464

Significant dates
- Added to NRHP: November 17, 1978
- Designated NMSRCP: August 27, 1976

The Huning Highlands Historic District is a historic district in Albuquerque, New Mexico which encompasses the entirety of the Huning Highlands neighborhood. The district is bounded by Dr. Martin Luther King Jr. Avenue to the north, Locust Street to the east, Iron Avenue to the south, and the Burlington Northern Santa Fe railroad tracks to the west, covering an area of about 0.3 square miles (0.78 km^{2}). The neighborhood was Albuquerque's first residential subdivision and was mostly developed between the 1880s and 1920s. It is known for its high concentration of Victorian and early 20th-century houses. The district was added to the New Mexico State Register of Cultural Properties in 1976 and the National Register of Historic Places in 1978.

== History ==
The Atchison, Topeka, and Santa Fe Railway reached Albuquerque in 1880, fueling land speculation as investors hoped to profit from its arrival. The New Mexico Town Company, formed by local businessmen Franz Huning, Elias S. Stover, and William Hazeldine, succeeded in attracting the railroad facilities to their chosen site about 1.5 miles (2.4 km) from the existing community at Old Town. The 3.1-square-mile (8.0 km^{2}) parcel they assembled quickly developed into the booming community of New Town—today's Downtown. Huning also owned land in the rolling sandhills further to the east, which was known as the Highlands due to its elevation. In 1880, the land was platted as the first subdivision to be added to the original townsite. This new neighborhood was named Huning's Highland Addition, which later shifted to Huning Highlands.

The neighborhood was laid out by civil engineer Walter G. Marmon, who named the main north-south streets Arno, after Franz Huning's son, Walter and Edith after his own son and daughter, and Broadway, because "every town should have a Broadway". The uppermost street of the gently sloping neighborhood was named High Street. The Highlands quickly became one of Albuquerque's most popular residential areas and was home to many of the city's prominent early residents. Unlike the old Hispanic neighborhoods like Old Town, Barelas, and Atrisco, Huning Highlands was primarily built by recently arrived Anglo-Americans and European immigrants. As such, the houses in the neighborhood reflected styles and materials popular in the eastern and Midwestern United States—Queen Anne, Italianate, and other Victorian styles—rather than traditional regional forms. Most of the houses were built using prefabricated trim and architectural elements in a mix-and-match approach not adhering to any particular style, though some are more cohesive.

The neighborhood continued to fill in between the 1880s and 1920s, by which time it was almost completely built up. Residents enjoyed amenities like Highland Park, one of the city's oldest public parks, the Old Main Library, and an electric streetcar line which went into service in 1911. However, as the city continued to grow, many wealthy residents abandoned the older inner-city neighborhoods in favor of the more suburban developments further to the east. By the 1970s, Huning Highlands had become a relatively poor neighborhood consisting largely of absentee-owned rental housing.

The Huning Highlands Historic District was added to the National Register of Historic Places in 1978 and in 1980, the Albuquerque City Council approved the city's first Historic Overlay Zone for the neighborhood. The city designation requires approval from the Landmarks and Urban Conservation Commission for any alterations to contributing properties in the district and provides tax incentives for home restoration projects. These actions had a positive effect on the neighborhood and led to many of the historic houses being restored. According to the Huning Highlands Historic District Association, the percentage of properties that were considered "blighted or substandard" decreased from 52% in 1976 to 17% in 1986 and was estimated at less than 5% by 2005.

== Notable buildings ==
Name	Image	Location	Year built	Style	Notes
AT&SF Memorial Hospital		806 Central Ave. SE; 35°4′57″N 106°38′17″W	1926	Mediterranean Revival	Albuquerque landmark
E. J. Alger House		124 Walter St. SE	1900	Italianate	
Auge Store		214 Arno St. NE	c. 1908		
D. A. Bittner House		120 Walter St. SE	1901	Dutch Colonial Revival	
Boatright House		220 Edith Blvd. SE	1888	Queen Anne	David Boatright was an early mayor of Albuquerque.
Charles E. Boldt House		323 Edith Blvd. SE	c. 1904	Dutch Colonial Revival	
D. R. Boyd House		123 High St. SE	c. 1895	Queen Anne	
G. E. Brewer House		215 Walter St. SE	1901	Queen Anne	
T. I. Butts House		201 High St. NE	c. 1909	Queen Anne	
Children's Home and Hospital (Regina Hall)		806 Dr. Martin Luther King Jr. Ave. NE	c. 1921	Prairie School	
H. G. Coors House		116 Walter St. SE	c. 1920	Bungalow	
P. G. Cornish House		123 Walter St. SE	c. 1900	Queen Anne	
Edward Buxton Cristy House		201 Walter St. SE	1897	Queen Anne	E. B. Cristy was an architect and designed the house himself.
Duplex at 108-110 Arno SE		108-110 Arno St. SE	c. 1898	Folk Victorian	
J. L. Durling House		410 Edith Blvd. SE	c. 1894	Stick	
Andrew Hatch House		218 Walter St. SE	1901	Folk Victorian	
Highland Hotel		202 Central Ave. SE; 35°5′1″N 106°38′44″W	1906	Chicago School	Albuquerque landmark
Mrs. Hill's Boarding House		321 Walter St. SE	c. 1890	Queen Anne	
Horner House		520 Arno St. SE	1881		Oldest known house in district
House at 204 Arno SE		204 Arno St. NE	c. 1882		
House at 210 High SE		210 High St. SE	c. 1895	Folk Victorian	
House at 212 High SE		212 High St. SE	c. 1890	Queen Anne	
House at 306 Walter SE		306 Walter St. SE	1907	Queen Anne	
House at 317 Walter SE		317 Walter St. SE	c. 1890	Folk Victorian	
House at 320 Edith SE		320 Edith Blvd. SE	c. 1903	Folk Victorian	
House at 411 Arno St. SE		411 Arno St. SE	c. 1890s	Queen Anne	
Jack Korber House		301 Arno St. SE	1916	Prairie School	
J. E. Learnard House		210 Walter St. SE	1898	Queen Anne	
W. J. Marsh House		301 Edith Blvd. SE	c. 1895	Folk Victorian	
C. L. McClanahan House		201 Arno St. SE	1910	Queen Anne	
A. B. McMillan House		119 Walter St. SE	1896	Queen Anne	
McQuade House		201 Walter St. NE	1901	Queen Anne	
I. J. Mize House		316 Walter St. SE	c. 1900	Folk Victorian	
Old Albuquerque High School		Central and Broadway NE; 35°5′3″N 106°38′38″W	1914	Collegiate Gothic	SR 1977; Albuquerque landmark
Old Main Library		423 Central Ave. NE; 35°5′2″N 106°38′33″W	1925	Pueblo Revival	SR 1975; Albuquerque landmark
F. J. Patchin House		207 High St. NE	1906	Dutch Colonial Revival	
Seth House		322 Arno St. SE	c. 1883	Folk Victorian	
C. E. Vaughn House		423 Arno St. SE	c. 1900	Queen Anne	
William Whitney House		302 Walter St. SE	1907	Neoclassical	
Whittlesey House		201 Highland Park Cir. SE; 35°4′54″N 106°38′21″W	1903	Norwegian Vernacular	SR 1975; Albuquerque landmark
