= Vernacular architecture in Norway =

Vernacular architecture in Norway covers about 4,000 years of archeological, literary, and preserved structures. Within the history of Norwegian architecture, vernacular traditions form a distinct and pervasive influence that persists to this day.

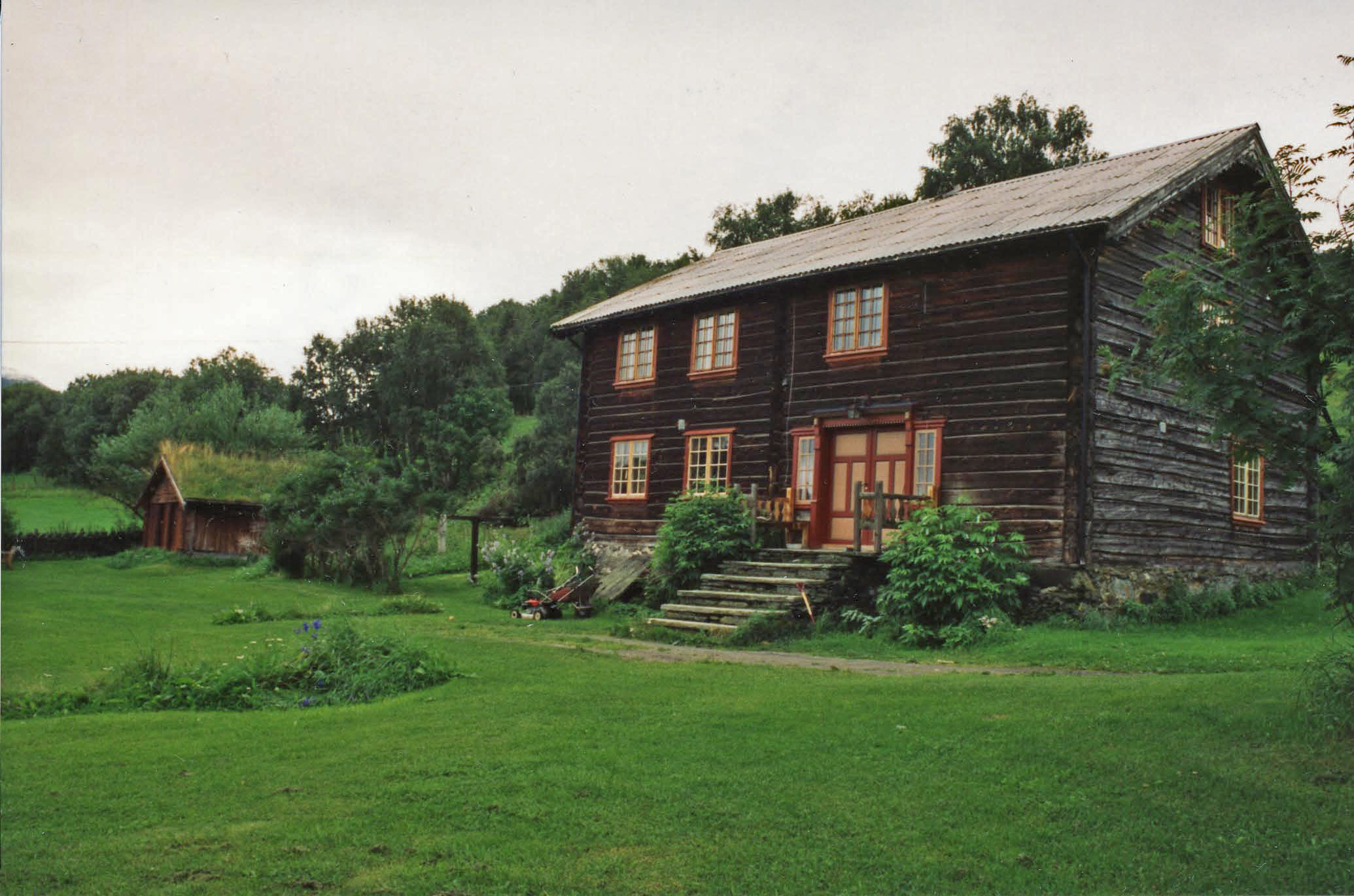
Example of Trønderlåne in Oppdal Municipality

== Early origins ==
Archeological evidence in Norway indicates that Nordic Bronze Age and Iron Age settlements were commonly large, communal, and multipurpose buildings. These buildings were not particularly durable; they were supported by posts in the ground that rotted in the course of a few decades. Roofs were thatched or covered with birch bark and turf, and walls were built of turf, palisades or Wattle and daub.

Over time, the buildings became more elaborate, notably with internal pillars and increasingly sophisticated structural practices. Large farms took the form of small communities, with several buildings, including a hall of assembly. These houses eventually could be as much as 90 meters long and 7 meters wide. These had central open hearths with vents in the roof above.

== Stave, palisade, and log building ==
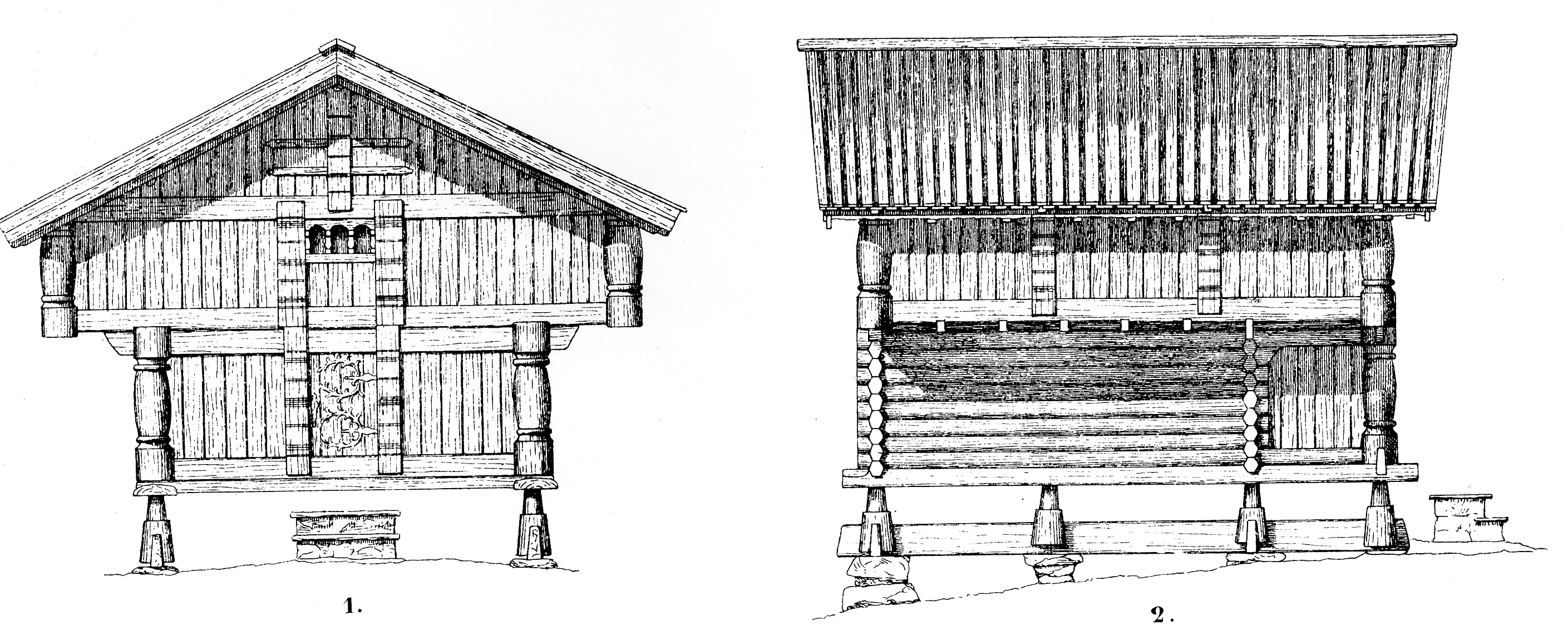
Example of loft architecture in Numedal

The method of wood stave construction evolved over several hundred years in Norway, reaching their apex with the stave churches in the 13th century in Norway and into the 14th century in Iceland.

Stave construction lent itself well to building the earlier large, multipurpose houses.
