= National Register of Historic Places listings in Greenwood County, Kansas =

Location of Greenwood County in Kansas

This is a list of the National Register of Historic Places listings in Greenwood County, Kansas.

This is intended to be a complete list of the properties on the National Register of Historic Places in Greenwood County, Kansas, United States. The locations of National Register properties for which the latitude and longitude coordinates are included below, may be seen in a map.

There are 16 properties listed on the National Register in the county.

This National Park Service list is complete through NPS recent listings posted December 12, 2025.

== Current listings ==
	Name on the Register	Image	Date listed	Location	City or town	Description
1	Archeological Site Number 14GR320		July 9, 1982 (#82004880)	Address restricted	Fall River State Park	
2	Curry Archeological Site		November 20, 1974 (#74000838)	Address restricted	Madison	
3	Eureka Atchison, Topeka and Santa Fe Railroad Depot	Eureka Atchison, Topeka and Santa Fe Railroad Depot	January 2, 2013 (#12001119)	416 E. 5th St. 37°49′25″N 96°17′21″W	Eureka	
4	Eureka Carnegie Library	Eureka Carnegie Library	August 10, 1988 (#88001170)	520 N. Main; 37°49′29″N 96°17′23″W	Eureka	
5	Eureka Downtown Historic District		September 30, 2019 (#100004458)	100-200 blks N. Main and N/2 100 blk. S. Main to Elm and Oak at 3rd to 4th Sts. 37°49′09″N 96°17′39″W	Eureka	
6	Greenwood Cemetery and Mausoleum		February 3, 2020 (#100004925)	00 East Seventh St. 37°49′31″N 96°17′22″W	Eureka	
7	Greenwood Hotel	Greenwood Hotel	September 6, 2006 (#06000769)	300 N. Main; 37°49′17″N 96°17′36″W	Eureka	
8	Paul Jones Building	Paul Jones Building	May 1, 2012 (#12000247)	319 W. River St. 37°49′03″N 96°17′53″W	Eureka	part of the Roadside Kansas Multiple Property Submission (MPS)
9	Lone Cone Site		May 17, 1976 (#76000822)	Address restricted	Madison	
10	Madison Atchison, Topeka and Santa Fe Railroad Depot	Madison Atchison, Topeka and Santa Fe Railroad Depot	December 6, 1991 (#91001774)	Junction of 3rd and Boone Sts. 38°08′23″N 96°08′07″W	Madison	
11	North Branch Otter Creek Bridge		July 2, 1985 (#85001426)	1 mile (1.6 km) west and 5 miles (8.0 km) north of Piedmont; 37°41′28″N 96°22′46″W	Piedmont	
12	Robertson House	Robertson House	February 7, 2011 (#10001207)	403 N. Plum; 37°41′28″N 96°22′46″W	Eureka	
13	Two Duck Site		March 26, 1975 (#75000713)	Address restricted	Severy	
14	US Post Office-Eureka	US Post Office-Eureka	October 17, 1989 (#89001637)	301 N. Oak St. 37°49′20″N 96°17′51″W	Eureka	
15	Verdigris River Bridge		July 2, 1985 (#85001444)	0.5 miles (0.80 km) north of Madison; 38°08′46″N 96°08′19″W	Madison	
16	Westside Service Station and Riverside Motel	Westside Service Station and Riverside Motel	May 1, 2012 (#12000248)	325 W. River St. 37°49′02″N 96°17′54″W	Eureka	part of the Roadside Kansas MPS

== See also ==
- List of National Historic Landmarks in Kansas
- National Register of Historic Places listings in Kansas
