= Santa Fe =

Santa Fe (Spanish; 'holy faith') or Santa Fé (Portuguese; 'holy faith') may refer to:

== Places ==
=== Argentina ===
- Santa Fe, Argentina
  - Santa Fe Province

=== Bolivia ===
- Santa Fe de Yapacaní
- Santa Fe (Oruro)

=== Brazil ===
- Bonito de Santa Fé
- Santa Fé de Goiás
- Santa Fé de Minas
- Santa Fé do Araguaia
- Santa Fé do Sul
- Santa Fé, Paraná

=== Chile ===
- Santa Fe (fort), near the island of Diego Diaz

=== Colombia ===
- Santa Fe, Bogotá
- Santa Fe de Antioquia
- Santa Fe de Ralito

=== Cuba ===
- Santa Fe, Havana
- Santa Fe, Isle of Youth

=== Ecuador ===
- Santa Fe Island, one of the Galápagos Islands

=== Honduras ===
- Santa Fe, Colón
- Santa Fe, Ocotepeque

=== Mexico ===
- Santa Fe, Mexico City
- Santa Fe de la Laguna

=== Panama ===
- Santa Fe, Darién
- Santa Fe District
- Santa Fe, Veraguas

=== Philippines ===
- Santa Fe, Cebu
- Santa Fe, Leyte
- Santa Fe, Nueva Vizcaya
- Santa Fe, Romblon

=== Spain ===
- Santa Fe de Mondújar
- Santa Fe del Penedès
- Santa Fe, Granada

=== United States ===
- New Mexico or Nuevo México, US state formerly Santa Fe de Nuevo México
  - Santa Fe de Nuevo México, a former province of New Spain and territory of Mexico (1598–1848)
  - Santa Fe, New Mexico, state capital
    - Santa Fe County, New Mexico
  - Santa Fe River (New Mexico)
- Rancho Santa Fe, California
- Santa Fe, Oakland, California
- Santa Fe Springs, California
- Lake Santa Fe, Alachua County, Florida
- Santa Fe River (Florida)
- Santa Fe Township, Clinton County, Illinois
- New Santa Fe, Indiana
- Santa Fe, Miami County, Indiana
- Santa Fe, Spencer County, Indiana
- Santa Fe, Missouri
- Santa Fe, Ohio
- Santa Fe, Oklahoma
- Santa Fe, Tennessee
- Santa Fe, Texas
- Terrenos Santa Fe, Texas

== Arts and entertainment ==
=== Music ===
- Santa Fe (group), a musical trio
- "Santa Fe" (Bellamy Brothers song), a 1988 single by The Bellamy Brothers
- "Santa-Fe" (Bob Dylan song), a 1967 song by Bob Dylan
- "Santa Fe", a song from the 1990 Jon Bon Jovi album Blaze of Glory
- "Santa Fe", a song from the 2011 album The Rip Tide by Beirut
- "Santa Fe", a song from the musical Newsies
- "Santa Fe", a song from the musical Rent

=== Other uses in arts and entertainment ===
- Santa Fe (film), a 1951 Western starring Randolph Scott
- Santa Fe (book), a 1991 photo book by Kishin Shinoyama

== Sports ==
- CD Santa Fe, a Spanish football club
- Colón de Santa Fe, an Argentine football club
- Independiente Santa Fe, a Colombian football club
- Unión de Santa Fe, an Argentine football club

== Transportation ==
- Hyundai Santa Fe, a sport utility vehicle

=== Ships ===
- ARA Santa Fe, the name of several ships of the Argentine navy
- SS Santa Fé (1921), a German cargo ship, sunk in the Black Sea in 1943
- SS Santa Fe (1943), a Liberian and Chilean Liberty ship, sunk in 1967
- USS Santa Fe, the name of two US Navy ships

=== Railway ===
- Atchison, Topeka and Santa Fe Railway, often known as just Santa Fe, US
- Chili Line, or Santa Fe Branch, US (1880s–1941)
- Santa Fe Southern Railway, New Mexico, US (1992–present)
- 2-10-2, the "Santa Fe" type wheel arrangement

== People ==
- Gerónimo de Santa Fe (fl. 1400–1430), Spanish Christian convert, physician and writer
- Enrique Marzal Santafé (1940–2025), Spanish clothing designer
- Saint Faith, French 3rd century saint

== Other uses ==
- Disney's Hotel Santa Fe, a hotel at Disneyland Resort Paris
- Santa Fe Abbey, a former monastery in Zaragoza, Spain
- Santa Fe College, in Florida, U.S.
- Santa Fe Community College, in New Mexico, U.S.

== See also ==
- Saint Faith
- Sainte-Foy (disambiguation)
- Santa Fe High School (disambiguation)
- Santa Fe Depot (disambiguation)
- Santa Fe Station (disambiguation)
- Santa Fe Trail (disambiguation)
- Santa Fe Independent School District v. Doe, a U.S. Supreme Court case about school prayer
