= Atchison, Topeka and Santa Fe Railway Depot =

Atchison, Topeka and Santa Fe Railway Depot, Santa Fe Depot, Santa Fe Passenger Depot, or variations with Railroad or Station or Passenger and/or Freight may refer to any one of many stations of the Atchison, Topeka and Santa Fe Railway. These include (by state then city):

== Arizona ==
- Wickenburg station

== California ==
- Claremont station (California), Claremont, California, also known as Atchison, Topeka, and Santa Fe Railroad Station
- Santa Fe Passenger Depot (Fresno, California), Fresno, California
- La Grande Station (passenger depot), Los Angeles
- Santa Fe Freight Depot, Los Angeles
- Monrovia station
- Orange Cove station (Atchison, Topeka and Santa Fe Railway), Orange Cove, California
- Del Mar station, Pasadena
- Riverside–Downtown station
- San Bernardino Santa Fe Depot, San Bernardino, California, also known as Atchison, Topeka and Santa Fe Railway Passenger and Freight Depot
- Santa Fe Depot (San Diego), San Diego, California
- Shafter station (Atchison, Topeka and Santa Fe Railway), Shafter, California

== Colorado ==
- Atchison, Topeka and Santa Fe Passenger Depot (Colorado Springs, Colorado), listed on the National Register of Historic Places (NRHP) in Colorado
- Santa Fe Depot (Lamar, Colorado)
- Santa Fe Railway Manzanola Depot, listed on the NRHP in Otero County, Colorado

== Illinois ==
- Coal City station
- Santa Fe Railway Depot (Galesburg, Illinois)
- Streator Station, former AT&SF station in Streator, Illinois

== Iowa ==
- Atchison, Topeka and Santa Fe Passenger and Freight Complex Historic District, Fort Madison, Iowa, listed on the NRHP in Lee County, Iowa

== Kansas ==
- Atchison, Topeka and Santa Fe Railway Depot (Dodge City, Kansas), listed on the National Register of Historic Places in Ford County, Kansas
- Santa Fe Depot (Baldwin City, Kansas), listed on the National Register of Historic Places (NRHP) in Douglas County
- Santa Fe Railroad Depot, within the Bartlett Arboretum historic area in Belle Plaine
- Atchison, Topeka and Santa Fe Railway Depot (Dodge City, Kansas), listed on the NRHP in Ford County
- Eureka Atchison, Topeka and Santa Fe Railroad Depot, listed on the National Register of Historic Places in Greenwood County, Kansas
- Santa Fe Depot (Garden City, Kansas)
- Atchison, Topeka and Santa Fe Railroad Passenger Depot (Leavenworth, Kansas), listed on the National Register of Historic Places in Leavenworth County, Kansas
- Madison Atchison, Topeka and Santa Fe Railroad Depot, Madison, Kansas, listed on the National Register of Historic Places in Greenwood County, Kansas
- Santa Fe Depot (Newton, Kansas)
- Old Depot Museum, a former Santa Fe depot in Ottawa
- Strong City Atchison, Topeka, & Santa Fe Depot, Strong City, Kansas, listed on the National Register of Historic Places listings in Chase County, Kansas

== Missouri ==
- Walt Disney Hometown Museum, a former Santa Fe depot in Marceline

== New Mexico ==
- Atchison, Topeka, and Santa Fe Railroad Depot (Los Lunas, New Mexico), listed on the NRHP in Valencia County
- Atchison, Topeka and Santa Fe Railway Depot (Magdalena, New Mexico), listed on the NRHP in Socorro County
- Santa Fe Depot (Santa Fe, New Mexico)

== Oklahoma ==
- A former Santa Fe station in Cheyenne, Oklahoma
- Santa Fe Depot (Drumwright, Oklahoma), listed on the NRHP in Creek County
- Railroad Museum of Oklahoma, a former Santa Fe depot in Enid
- Old Santa Fe Depot of Guthrie
- Santa Fe Depot (Marietta, Oklahoma), listed on the NRHP in Love County
- Santa Fe Depot (Norman, Oklahoma), listed on the NRHP in Cleveland County
- Santa Fe Depot (Oklahoma City)
- A former Santa Fe station at Pauls Valley station, Pauls Valley
- A former Santa Fe station in Perry, Oklahoma
- Santa Fe Depot (Ponca City, Oklahoma), listed on the NRHP in Kay County
- Santa Fe Depot (Shawnee, Oklahoma), listed on the NRHP in Pottawatomie County

== Texas ==
- Santa Fe Passenger Depot at Gainesville
- Santa Fe Passenger Depot (San Angelo, Texas), listed on the NRHP in Tom Green County
