= Eureka Downs =

Horse racing track in Kansas, United States

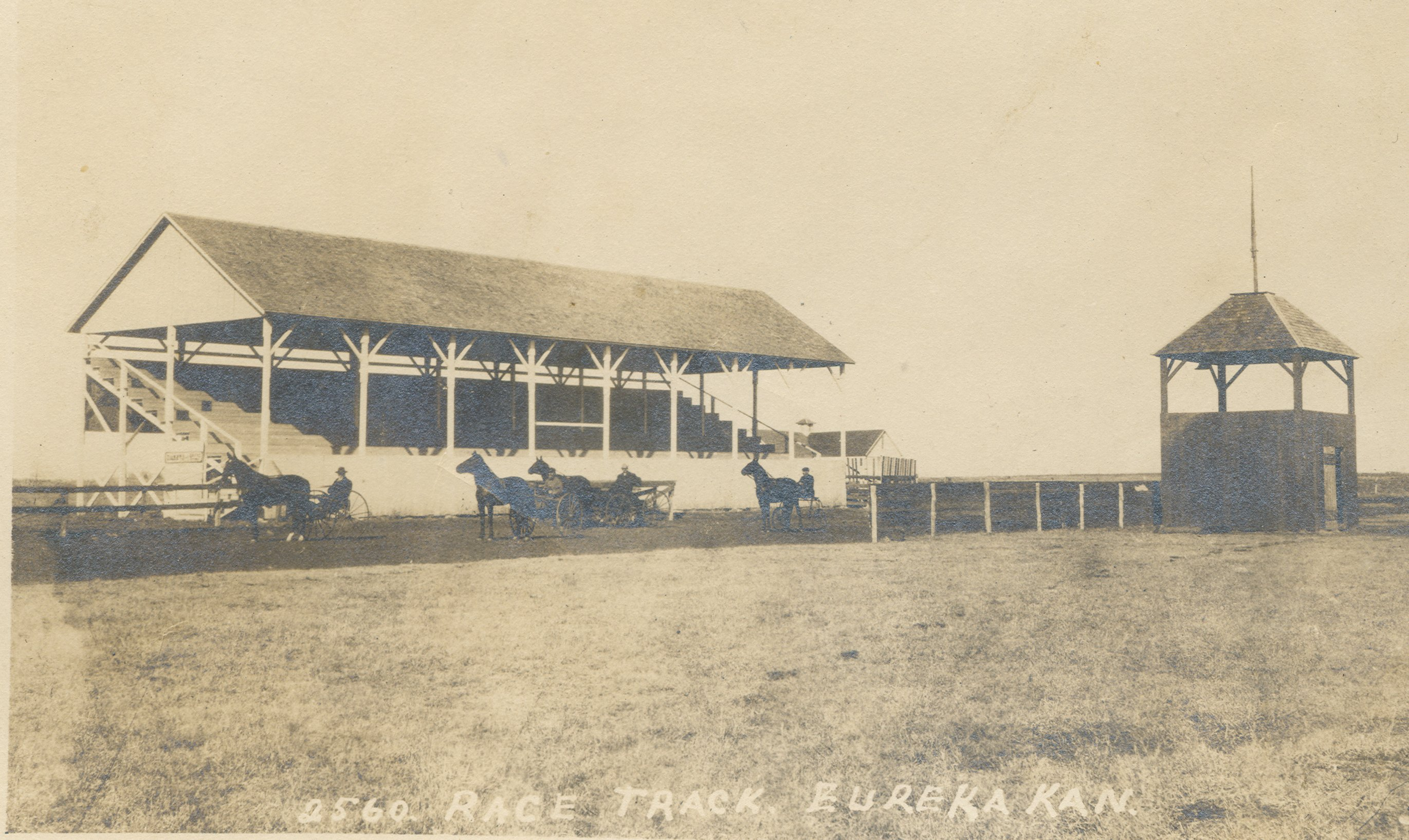
- Eureka Downs in 1910
- Interactive map of Eureka Downs
- Location: Eureka, Kansas
- Coordinates: 37.8206°N 96.2766°W
- Owned by: Greenwood County Fair Association
- Date opened: 1903
- Date closed: 2011
- Race type: Quarter horses
- Notable races: Kansas Bred Futurity

Eureka Downs is an American horse racing track located near U.S. Route 54 in Eureka, Greenwood County, Kansas. Run by the Greenwood County Fair Association, the facility hosted Standardbred harness racing, American Quarter Horse, and Thoroughbred flat racing events.

== History ==
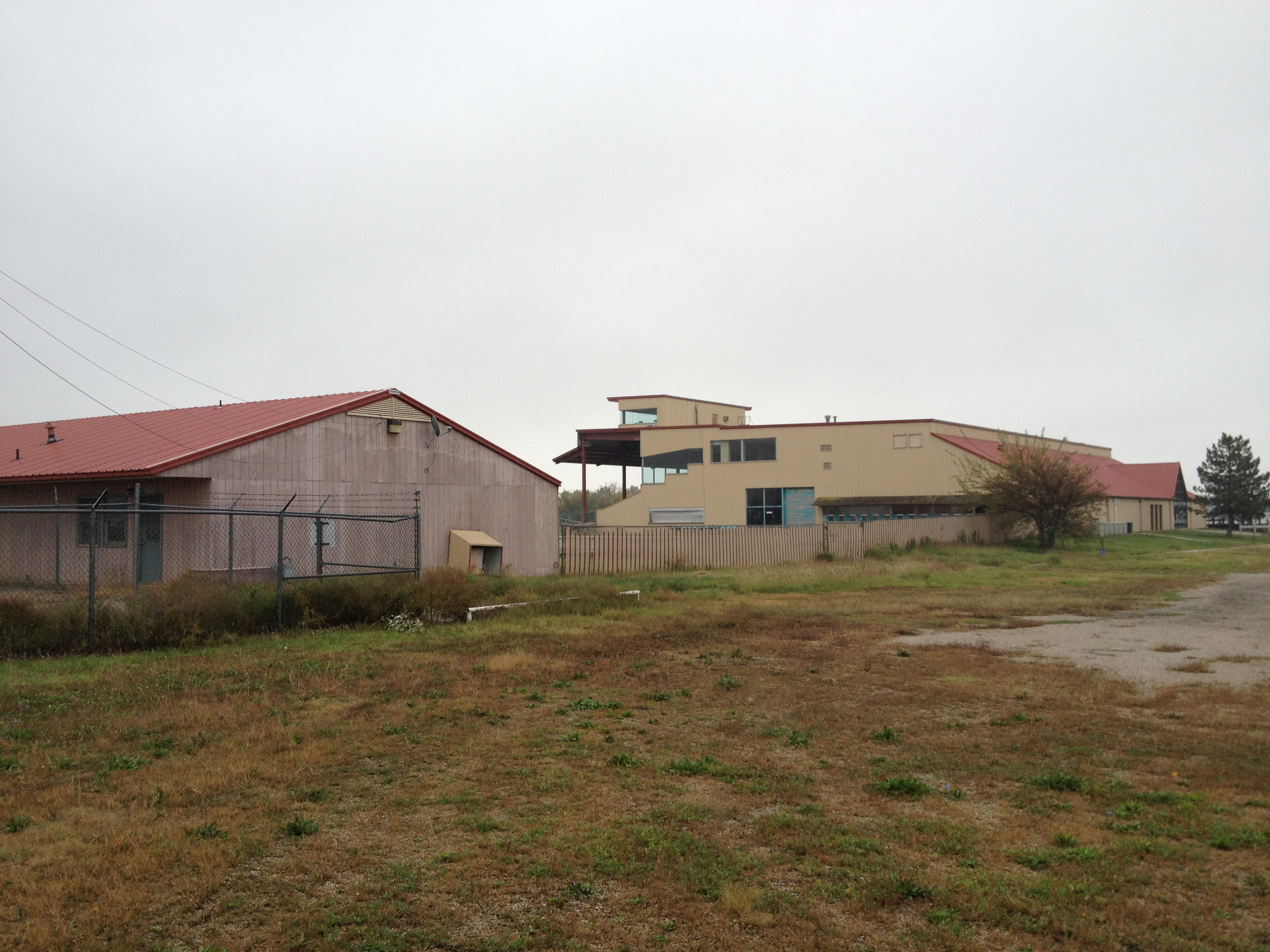
Eureka Downs in 2012

The track was originally built nearby in 1872, but relocated to the present location in 1902. It opened for its first season of racing in 1903, with Thoroughbred and harness racing until 1942 when the track closed for two years due to the outbreak of World War II. Racing resumed in 1945. In 1962 the Fair Association purchased land adjacent to the track to extend the track and build a 440-yard straightaway section to run American Quarter Horse races. The track also held Greyhound racing events on certain race days. The original grandstand burned in 1964 and was replaced.

The Downs was funded by entry fees, concessions, stable fees, and spectator tickets, and much of the labor at the track was provided by volunteers. At the track's peak in the 1970s, purse distribution was over $150,000 for the Futurity race date. Over time, however, interest in the sport declined and the track struggled to remain profitable.

== Parimutuel wagering ==
In 1986, Kansas voters approved Parimutuel betting at horse and dog racing facilities. 67% of Greenwood County residents approved the measure. In 1988, local businessmen raised $41,000 to fund a feasibility study to bring Parimutuel betting to Eureka Downs to improve the track's profitability and bring visitors and industry to Eureka. The study projected attendance of 1,585 per day, with an average daily handle of $87,810 with an average bet of $67.50. The expected annual economic impact to Eureka was $15 million and the track was projected to employ 180 to 200 people.

Later that year, the Kansas Racing Commission licensed the Greenwood County Fair Association to oversee pari-mutual racing and manage the track. The Eureka city government issued $1.5 million in Certificates of Participation to fund the necessary facility upgrades and the track held its first parimutuel race in September 1988. The last race of 1988 was attended by 1,717 people with a handle of $136,458. The total wager for 1988 was $1.65 million with an average attendance of 1,744, with an average wager of $55.78.

== Bankruptcy ==
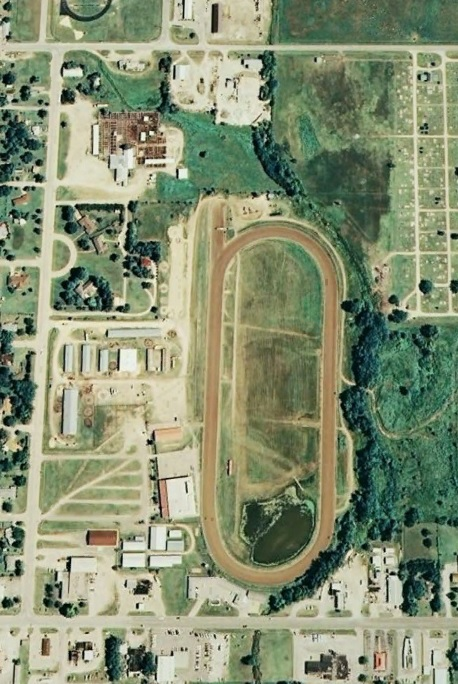
Aerial view of the facility in 2006

Attendance and revenue dropped sharply the next year due to competition from the new Wichita Greyhound Park in Wichita, The Woodlands in Kansas City, and larger horse racing venues in surrounding states. By the end of 1989, the track was $330,000 in debt. The track continued to struggle until July 1990, when the track filed for bankruptcy. At the time, average attendance had dropped to 723 people with an average wager of $42.00.

The remainder of the 1990 season was cancelled and the track remained closed until 1992, when the Kansas Legislature revised the law allowing simulcast wagering at all Kansas horse tracks. A Horse Racing Benefit Fund was created to subsidize Eureka Downs, Rooks County, and Anthony Downs, funded by a portion of the tax revenue from the larger tracks. In 1994, the track was reopened with an average attendance of 563 people wagering an average of $62.00 each, with a further subsidy of $340,680 from the Horse Racing Benefit Fund.

After the Wichita Greyhound Park closed in 2007 and The Woodlands closed in 2008, the Horse Racing Benefit Fund quickly depleted and the subsidy to Eureka Downs ended. The track operated for two more years without parimutuel wagering, then closed in 2011. An auction was held later that year.

== Planned reopening ==
Historical Horse Racing machines at the shuttered Wichita Greyhound Park are planned to open in September 2025, and 3% of total handle from the machines is earmarked for a live racing fund. Legislation was passed in 2024 to resume live racing at Eureka Downs, but the Governor vetoed it.

The legislation has now been passed, and the horses will return in 2026. There will be 6 days of horse racing. Three percent of the historic machines' gross revenue will be devoted to horse racing, estimated at around $15 million. The racing will be held at Eureka Downs in Eureka, Kansas.
