= Santa Fe River =

Santa Fe River may refer to a water body in the United States:

- Santa Fe River (Florida)
- Santa Fe River (New Mexico)
  - Santa Fe River watershed

== See also ==
- Santa Fe (disambiguation)
