= Anthony Downs (race track) =

American horse racing track

Anthony Downs was an American horse racing track located in Anthony, Harper County, Kansas.

== History ==
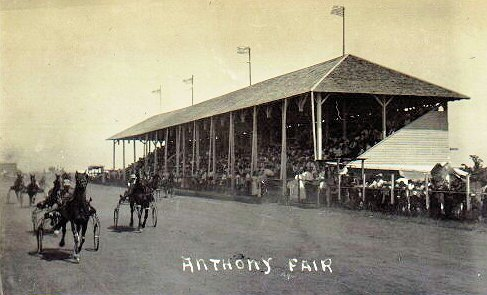
Anthony Downs horse racing track around 1910

The track opened for its first season of racing in 1904.

The track also held Greyhound racing events in addition to horse racing.

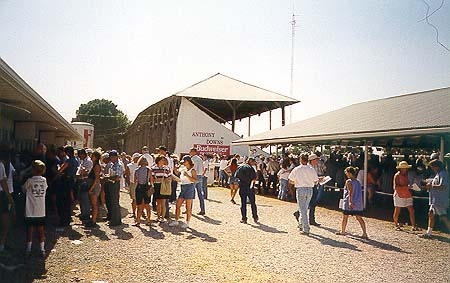
Anthony Downs in 1999. Credit to mcchump.com

When the Kansas Legislature revised the law allowing simulcast wagering at all Kansas horse tracks, a Horse Racing Benefit Fund was created 1992 to subsidize Eureka Downs, Rooks County, and Anthony Downs, funded by a portion of the tax revenue from the larger tracks.

After the Wichita Greyhound Park closed in 2007 and The Woodlands (race track) closed in 2008, the Horse Racing Benefit Fund quickly depleted and the subsidy to Anthony Downs ended and the track closed in 2009. An auction was held in 2012 and the facility was demolished to create space for a housing development.
