= Santa Fe station =

Santa Fe station may refer to:

- Santa Fe Station, a hotel and casino in Las Vegas, Nevada
- Santa Fe (Belgrano) railway station, a former station located in Santa Fe, Argentina (1928–1993)
- Santa Fe (Mitre) railway station, a former station located in Santa Fe, Argentina (1891–2007)
- Santa Fe railway station (Mexico City), a commuter station in Mexico

== See also ==
- Santa Fe Depot (disambiguation)
- Santa Fe (disambiguation)
