= Utopia College =

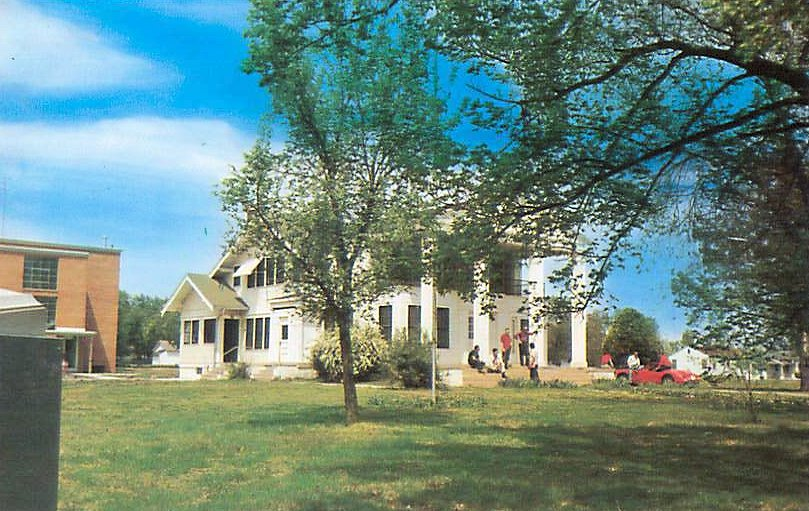
Utopia College in Eureka, Kansas. Later renamed Midwest Institute.

Utopia College was a two-year college in Eureka, Kansas that granted certificates but not diplomas. It was established in 1946 by Roger Babson with the intent to bring practical business instruction to other parts of the United States. Graduates were invited to complete their baccalaureate degrees at Babson College. The name was changed in 1955 to Midwest Institute of Business Administration. Due to declining enrollment, the school closed permanently in 1970.
