= Eureka, Kansas =

City in Greenwood County, Kansas

- City and County seat
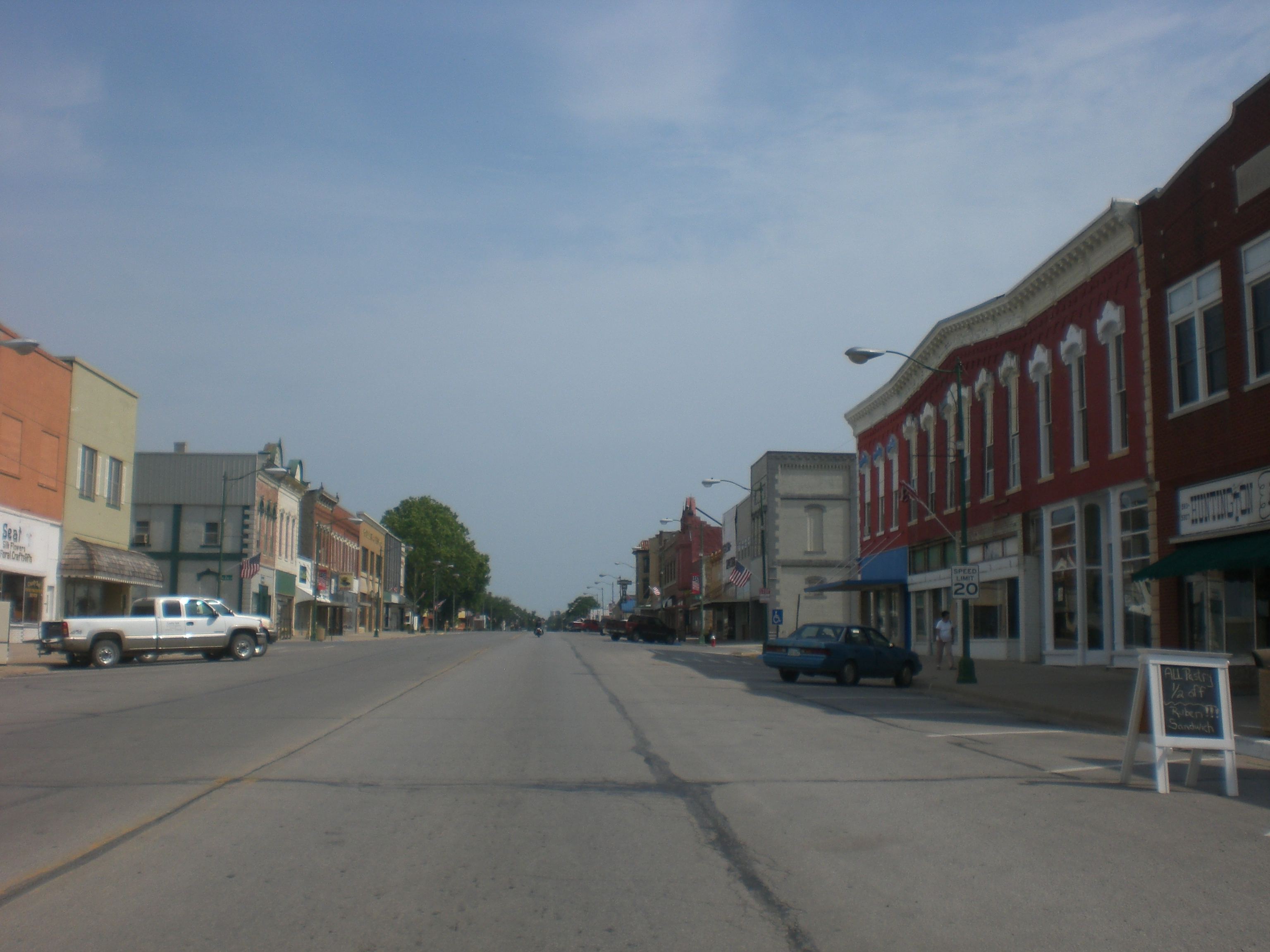
- Main street in Eureka (2012)

- Location within Greenwood County and Kansas

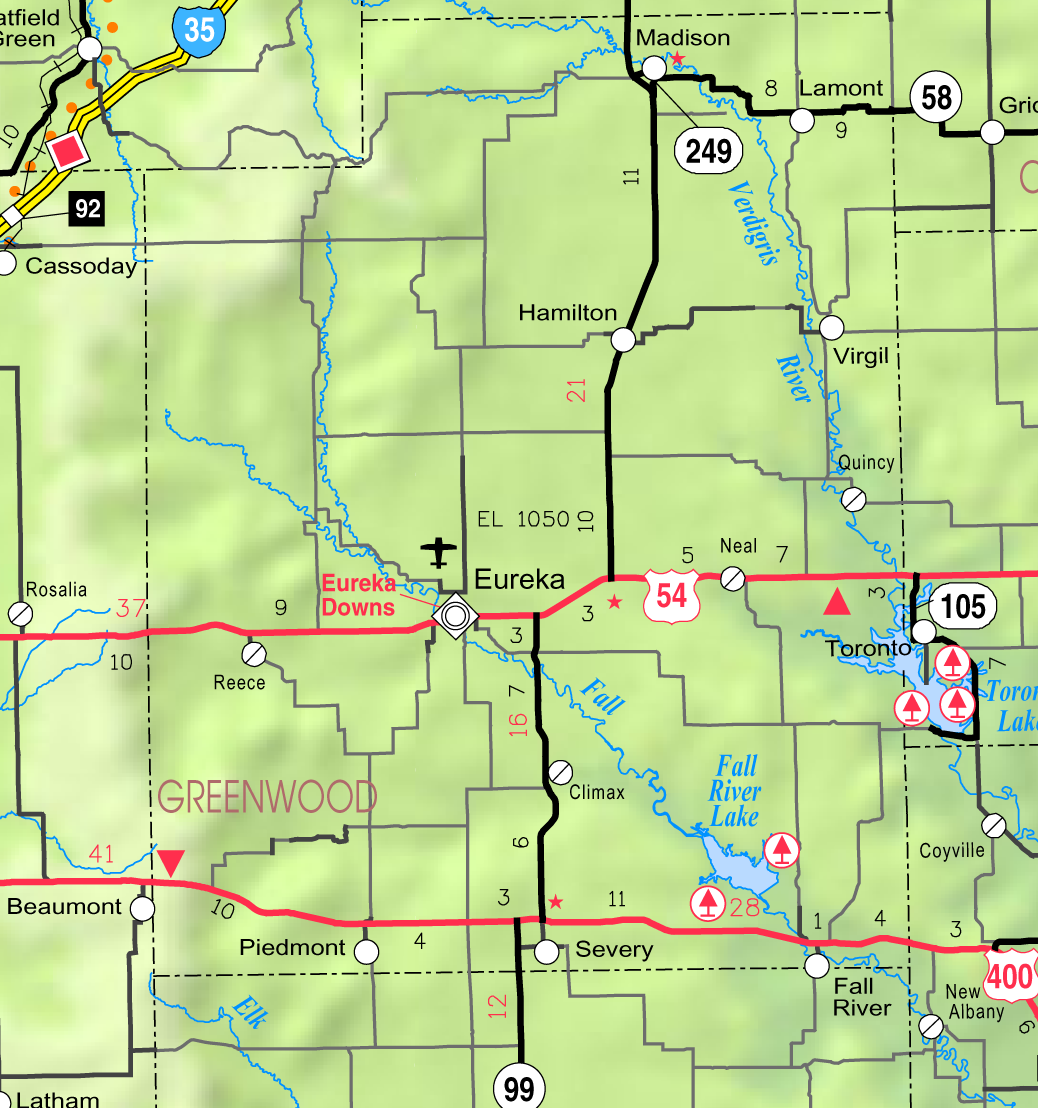
- KDOT map of Greenwood County (legend)
- Coordinates: 37°49′34″N 96°17′20″W
- Country: United States
- State: Kansas
- County: Greenwood
- Founded: 1857
- Platted: 1867
- Incorporated: 1870
- Named for: Eureka

Government
  - Type: Mayor–Council
  - Mayor: Steve Colter

Area
  - Total: 2.29 sq mi (5.93 km^{2})
  - Land: 2.29 sq mi (5.93 km^{2})
  - Water: 0 sq mi (0.00 km^{2})
- Elevation: 1,079 ft (329 m)

Population (2020)
  - Total: 2,332
  - Density: 1,020/sq mi (393/km^{2})
- Time zone: UTC-6 (CST)
  - Summer (DST): UTC-5 (CDT)
- ZIP Code: 67045
- Area code: 620
- FIPS code: 20-21800
- GNIS ID: 485572
- Website: eurekaks.org

Eureka is a city in and the county seat of Greenwood County, Kansas, United States. As of the 2020 census, the population of the city was 2,332.

== History ==
The first settlement at Eureka was in 1857. The first post office in Eureka was established in August 1858. Eureka was laid out in 1867, and it was incorporated in 1870. The city is named from the Greek expression Eureka, meaning "I have found it".

=== 2016 tornado ===
An EF2 tornado struck Eureka on July 7, 2016, at 9:45 pm. Over 143 total structures, including at least 50 homes, businesses, a nursing home, and grain elevator were damaged. No people were injured.

=== 2018 tornado ===
An EF3 tornado struck Eureka on June 26, 2018, at 7:21 pm (daylight). A total of 175 structures were damaged or destroyed, with 78 homes being damaged (12 uninhabitable and 10 totaled), and eight people injured.

== Geography ==
Eureka is located along the Fall River.

According to the United States Census Bureau, the city has a total area of 2.28 square miles (5.91 km^{2}), all land.

=== Climate ===
The climate in this area is characterized by hot, humid summers and generally mild to cool winters. According to the Köppen Climate Classification system, Eureka has a humid subtropical climate, abbreviated "Cfa" on climate maps.

Climate data for Eureka, Kansas, 1991–2020 normals, extremes 1909–present
Month	Jan	Feb	Mar	Apr	May	Jun	Jul	Aug	Sep	Oct	Nov	Dec	Year
Record high °F (°C)	78 (26)	86 (30)	93 (34)	99 (37)	101 (38)	110 (43)	120 (49)	115 (46)	109 (43)	98 (37)	85 (29)	82 (28)	120 (49)
Mean maximum °F (°C)	67.3 (19.6)	71.9 (22.2)	80.1 (26.7)	85.9 (29.9)	89.1 (31.7)	94.0 (34.4)	100.4 (38.0)	99.8 (37.7)	95.9 (35.5)	87.7 (30.9)	76.6 (24.8)	67.4 (19.7)	101.9 (38.8)
Mean daily maximum °F (°C)	42.6 (5.9)	47.6 (8.7)	58.2 (14.6)	67.5 (19.7)	75.6 (24.2)	84.8 (29.3)	90.3 (32.4)	89.5 (31.9)	82.1 (27.8)	70.5 (21.4)	57.3 (14.1)	45.6 (7.6)	67.6 (19.8)
Daily mean °F (°C)	30.7 (−0.7)	35.0 (1.7)	44.8 (7.1)	54.5 (12.5)	64.4 (18.0)	73.9 (23.3)	78.8 (26.0)	77.3 (25.2)	69.2 (20.7)	57.0 (13.9)	44.3 (6.8)	33.9 (1.1)	55.3 (13.0)
Mean daily minimum °F (°C)	18.8 (−7.3)	22.3 (−5.4)	31.5 (−0.3)	41.6 (5.3)	53.1 (11.7)	62.9 (17.2)	67.2 (19.6)	65.0 (18.3)	56.3 (13.5)	43.5 (6.4)	31.3 (−0.4)	22.2 (−5.4)	43.0 (6.1)
Mean minimum °F (°C)	1.8 (−16.8)	6.4 (−14.2)	15.3 (−9.3)	27.0 (−2.8)	39.0 (3.9)	51.9 (11.1)	58.3 (14.6)	55.2 (12.9)	41.7 (5.4)	27.7 (−2.4)	16.5 (−8.6)	6.6 (−14.1)	−2.2 (−19.0)
Record low °F (°C)	−22 (−30)	−20 (−29)	−10 (−23)	11 (−12)	27 (−3)	40 (4)	46 (8)	42 (6)	28 (−2)	11 (−12)	0 (−18)	−18 (−28)	−22 (−30)
Average precipitation inches (mm)	0.97 (25)	1.47 (37)	2.52 (64)	3.60 (91)	5.97 (152)	5.67 (144)	4.56 (116)	4.07 (103)	3.80 (97)	3.34 (85)	2.36 (60)	1.64 (42)	39.97 (1,016)
Average snowfall inches (cm)	2.8 (7.1)	1.2 (3.0)	0.9 (2.3)	0.1 (0.25)	0.0 (0.0)	0.0 (0.0)	0.0 (0.0)	0.0 (0.0)	0.0 (0.0)	0.1 (0.25)	0.5 (1.3)	3.0 (7.6)	8.6 (21.8)
Average precipitation days (≥ 0.01 in)	4.8	5.1	6.7	7.7	10.3	8.8	7.9	6.9	6.3	6.6	5.2	5.1	81.4
Average snowy days (≥ 0.1 in)	2.1	1.3	0.8	0.1	0.0	0.0	0.0	0.0	0.0	0.1	0.4	1.5	6.3
Source 1: NOAA
Source 2: National Weather Service

== Demographics ==
Historical population
Census	Pop.	Note	%±
1880	1,127		—
1890	2,259		100.4%
1900	2,091		−7.4%
1910	2,333		11.6%
1920	2,606		11.7%
1930	3,698		41.9%
1940	3,803		2.8%
1950	3,958		4.1%
1960	4,055		2.5%
1970	3,576		−11.8%
1980	3,425		−4.2%
1990	2,974		−13.2%
2000	2,914		−2.0%
2010	2,633		−9.6%
2020	2,332		−11.4%
U.S. Decennial Census

=== 2020 census ===
As of the 2020 census, Eureka had a population of 2,332, with 1,038 households and 568 families. The population density was 1,018.3 per square mile (393.2/km^{2}). There were 1,283 housing units at an average density of 560.3 per square mile (216.3/km^{2}).

The median age was 44.9 years. 22.1% of residents were under the age of 18, 6.1% were from ages 18 to 24, 21.9% were from ages 25 to 44, 25.0% were from ages 45 to 64, and 24.8% were 65 years of age or older. For every 100 females, there were 94.5 males, and for every 100 females age 18 and over, there were 90.6 males age 18 and over.

0.0% of residents lived in urban areas, while 100.0% lived in rural areas.

Of the city's households, 24.6% had children under the age of 18 living in them. Of all households, 38.6% were married-couple households, 22.7% were households with a male householder and no spouse or partner present, and 30.7% were households with a female householder and no spouse or partner present. About 39.4% of all households were made up of individuals and 18.1% had someone living alone who was 65 years of age or older.

Of the housing units, 19.1% were vacant. The homeowner vacancy rate was 3.2% and the rental vacancy rate was 11.7%.

Racial composition as of the 2020 census
Race	Number	Percent
White	2,090	89.6%
Black or African American	13	0.6%
American Indian and Alaska Native	14	0.6%
Asian	23	1.0%
Native Hawaiian and Other Pacific Islander	0	0.0%
Some other race	23	1.0%
Two or more races	169	7.2%
Hispanic or Latino (of any race)	103	4.4%

Non-Hispanic whites were 87.61% of the population.

=== Demographic estimates ===
The average household size was 2.1 and the average family size was 2.9. The percent of those with a bachelor's degree or higher was estimated to be 10.3% of the population.

=== Income and poverty ===
The 2016–2020 5-year American Community Survey estimates show that the median household income was $34,329 (with a margin of error of +/- $3,763) and the median family income was $45,563 (+/- $10,274). Males had a median income of $35,094 (+/- $8,495) versus $18,611 (+/- $5,359) for females. The median income for those above 16 years old was $26,750 (+/- $5,971). Approximately, 15.4% of families and 21.0% of the population were below the poverty line, including 22.3% of those under the age of 18 and 16.4% of those ages 65 or over.

=== 2010 census ===
As of the census of 2010, there were 2,633 people, 1,171 households, and 663 families living in the city. The population density was 1,154.8 inhabitants per square mile (445.9/km^{2}). There were 1,410 housing units at an average density of 618.4 per square mile (238.8/km^{2}). The racial makeup of the city was 95.2% White, 0.2% African American, 0.9% Native American, 0.4% Asian, 1.1% from other races, and 2.2% from two or more races. Hispanic or Latino of any race were 5.3% of the population.

There were 1,171 households, of which 27.2% had children under the age of 18 living with them, 41.0% were married couples living together, 10.4% had a female householder with no husband present, 5.2% had a male householder with no wife present, and 43.4% were non-families. 39.3% of all households were made up of individuals, and 18.8% had someone living alone who was 65 years of age or older. The average household size was 2.17 and the average family size was 2.86.

The median age in the city was 43.2 years. 23.7% of residents were under the age of 18; 6.9% were between the ages of 18 and 24; 21.5% were from 25 to 44; 25.5% were from 45 to 64; and 22.3% were 65 years of age or older. The gender makeup of the city was 47.9% male and 52.1% female.

== Education ==
The community is served by Eureka USD 389 public school district.

== Transportation ==
=== Airport ===
Eureka Municipal Airport is a city-owned, public-use airport located two nautical miles (4 km) north of the central business district of Eureka.

== Area attractions ==
- Greenwood Hotel, a historic hotel and cattle trading center
- Eureka Downs, horse racing facility

Former attractions

- Utopia College, former two-year college founded by Roger Babson
- Fort Montgomery, a frontier military fort

== Notable people ==
- Jim Brothers (1941–2013), figurative sculptor
- Charles Errickson (1897–1985), head football coach at Ottawa University, head football and basketball coach at Washburn University
- John Erickson (1863–1946), lawyer, eighth governor of Montana, and United States senator
- Lamon Harkness (1850–1915), businessman and Standard Oil heir
- Donald L. Hollowell (1919–2004), lawyer who represented Martin Luther King Jr.
- Fred Jackson (1868–1931), U.S. representative from Kansas.
- Kathy Patrick, author and founder of Pulpwood Queens
- Dale Prather (1910–1973), Professional football player
- Tyrel Reed (born 1989), basketball player who played for the University of Kansas
- Wes Santee (1932–2010), middle-distance runner
- Eric Smith, member of the Kansas House of Representatives
- Bob Whittaker (born 1939), U.S. representative from Kansas 1979 to 1991
- John Woods (1911–1950), United States Army master sergeant; executioner at Nuremberg Trials

== Gallery ==
- Historic Images of Eureka, Special Photo Collections at Wichita State University Library
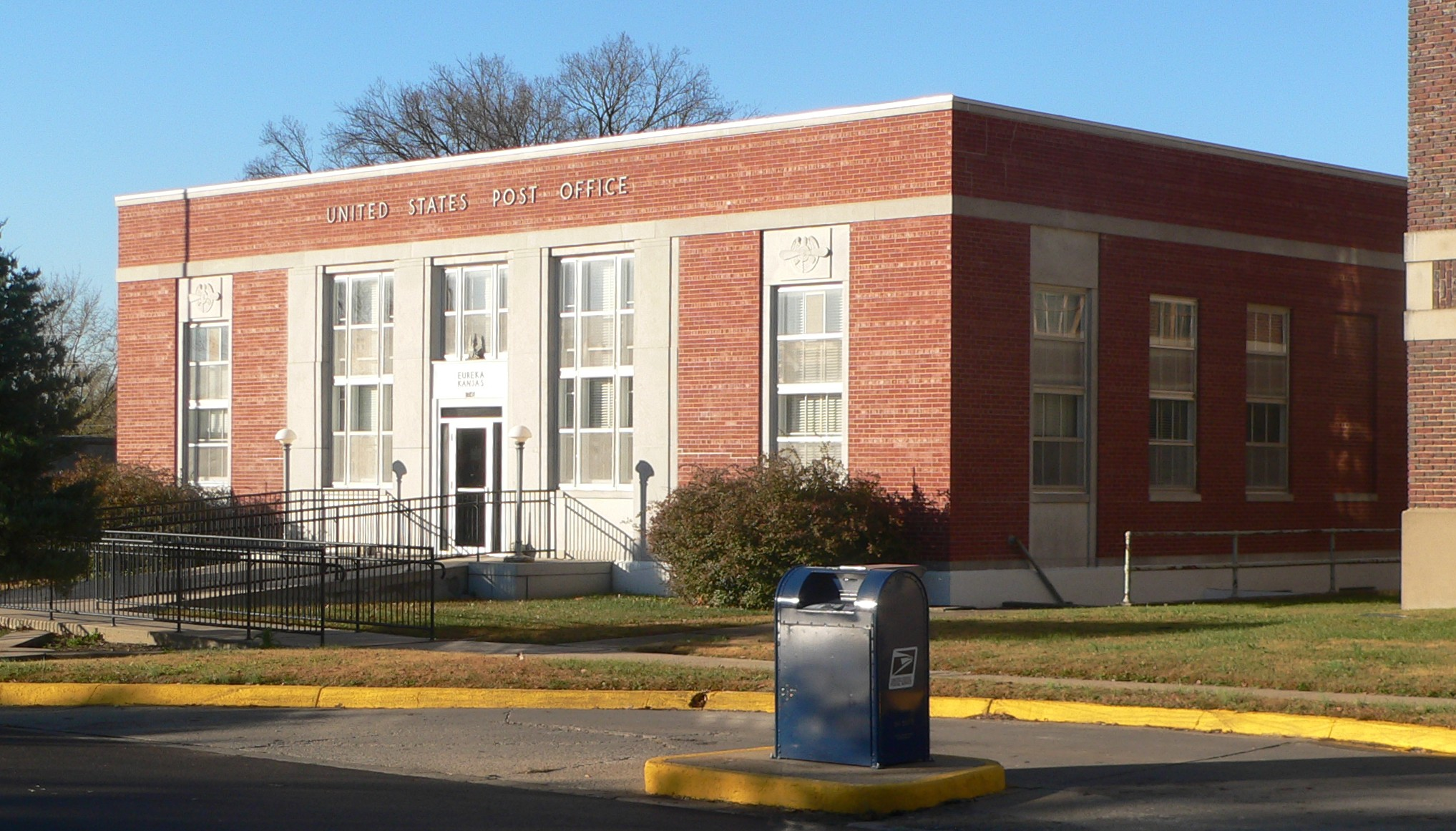
Eureka Post Office (NRHP) (2017)

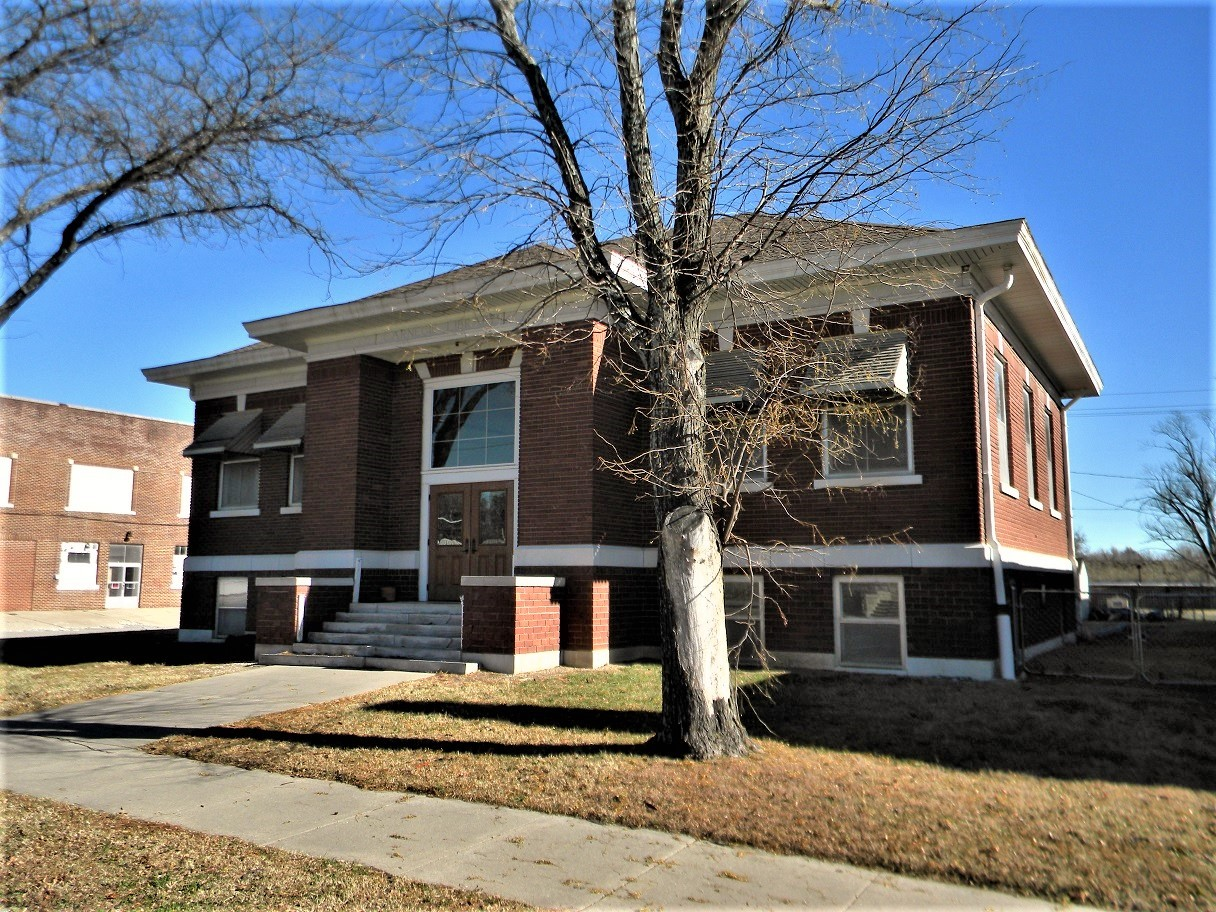
Eureka Carnegie Library (NRHP) (2017)

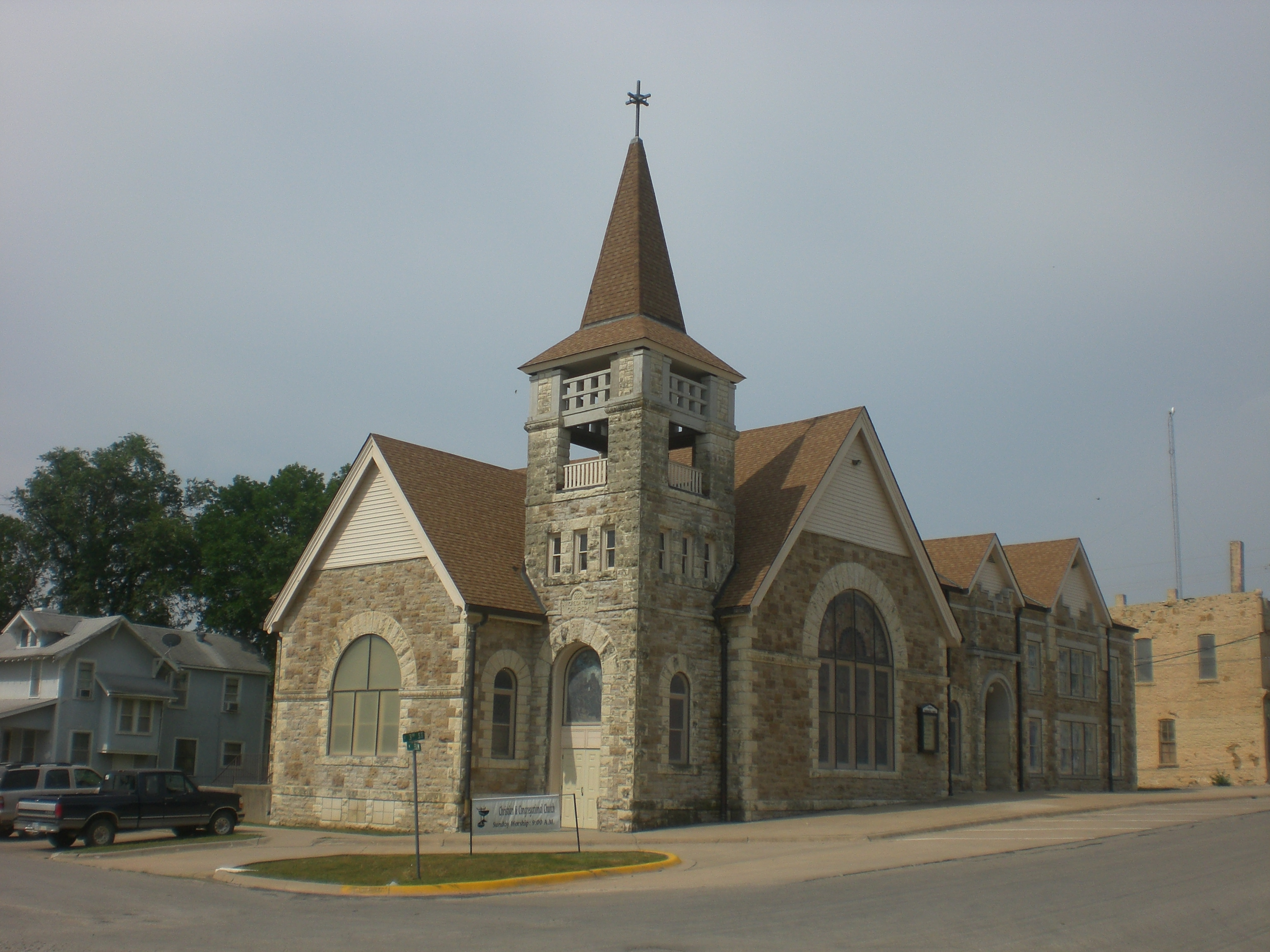
Congregational Church (2012)

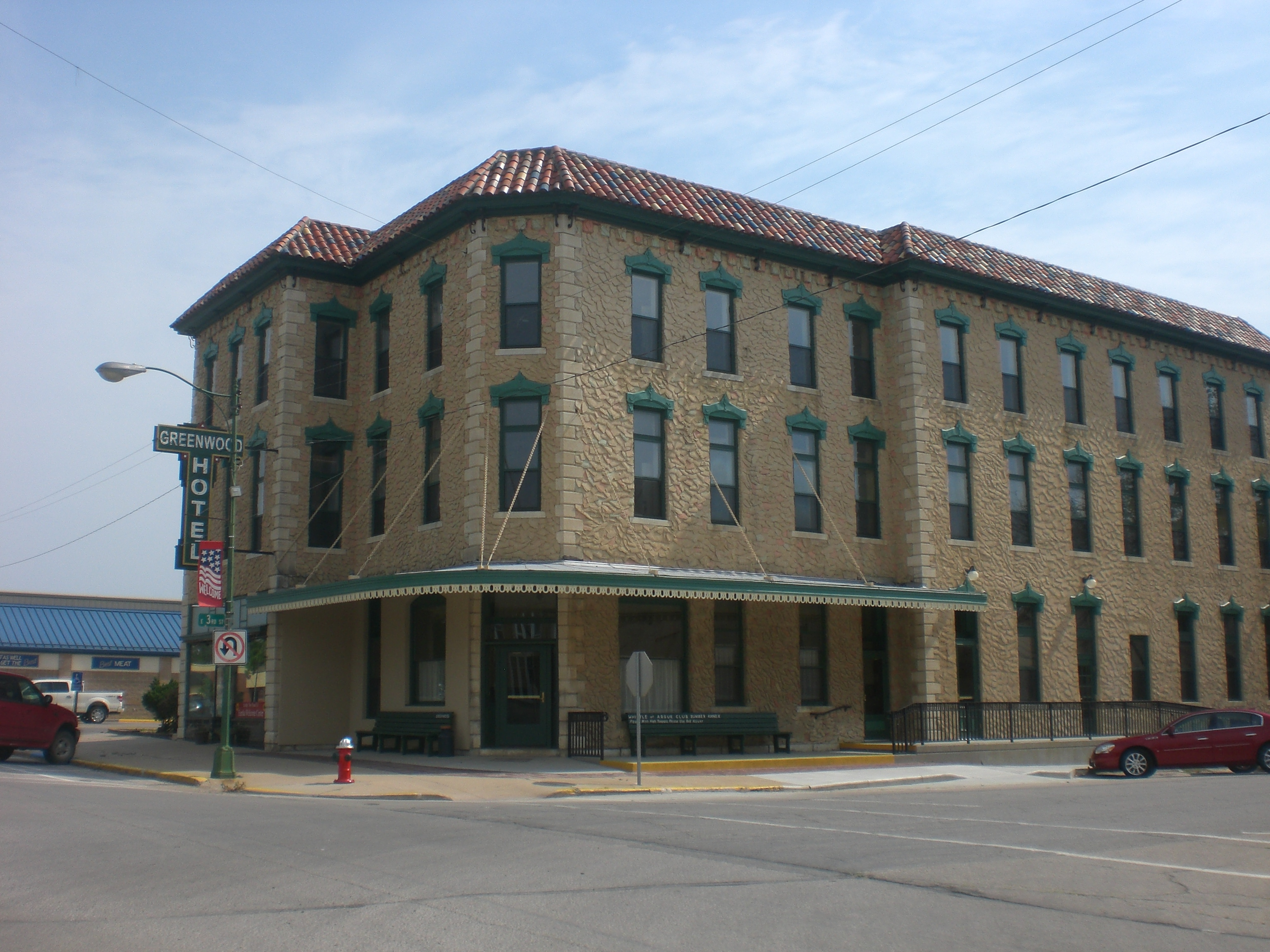
Greenwood Hotel (NRHP) (2012)

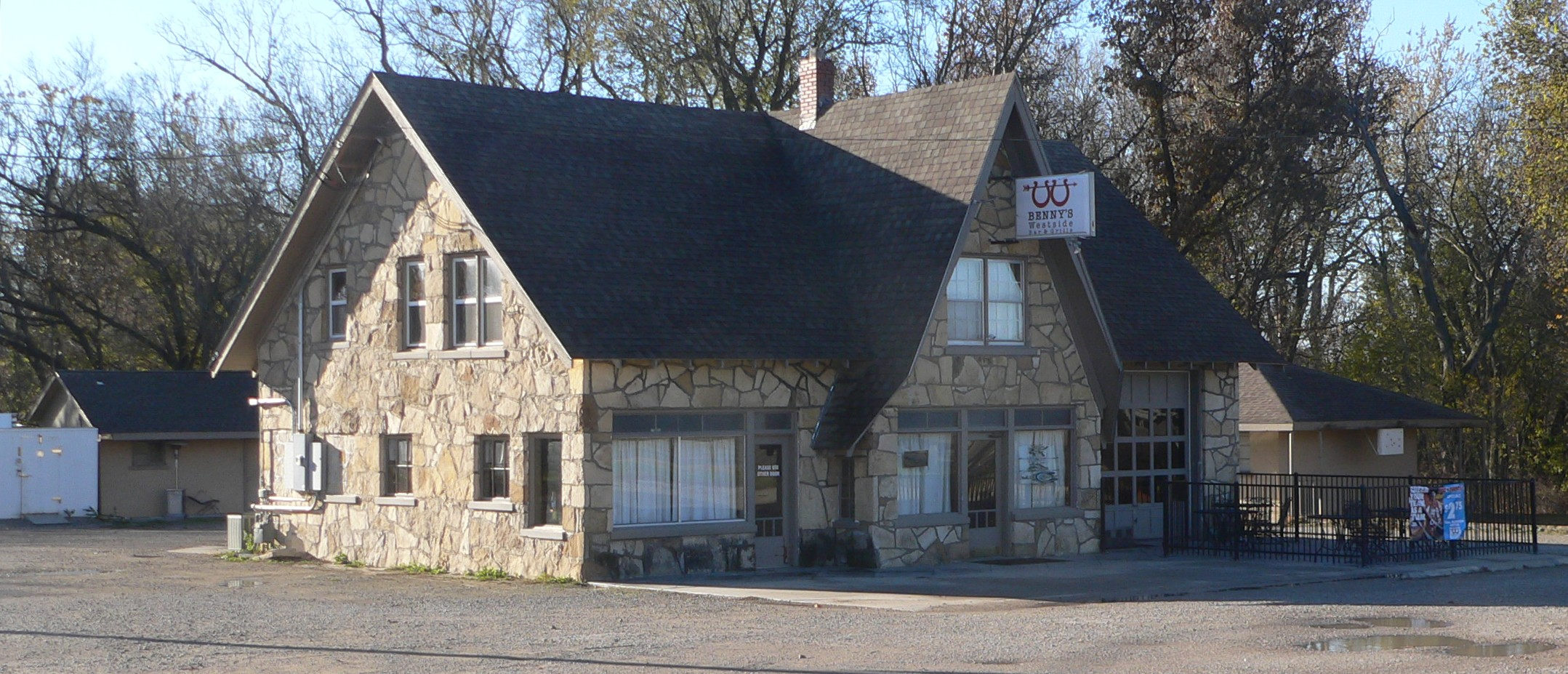
Benny's Westside Bar & Grille, formerly Westside Service Station and Riverside Motel (NRHP) (2017)

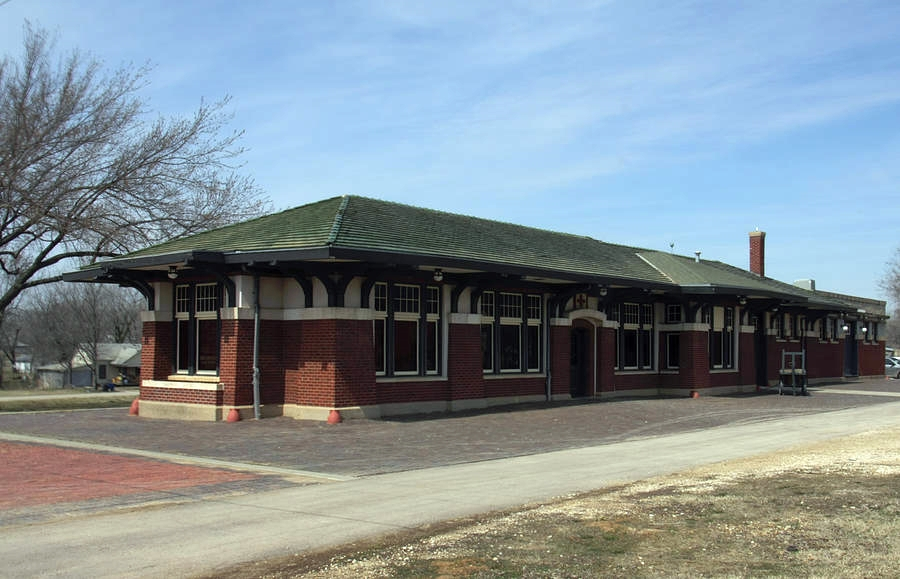
Eureka Atchison, Topeka and Santa Fe Railroad Depot (NRHP) (2013)

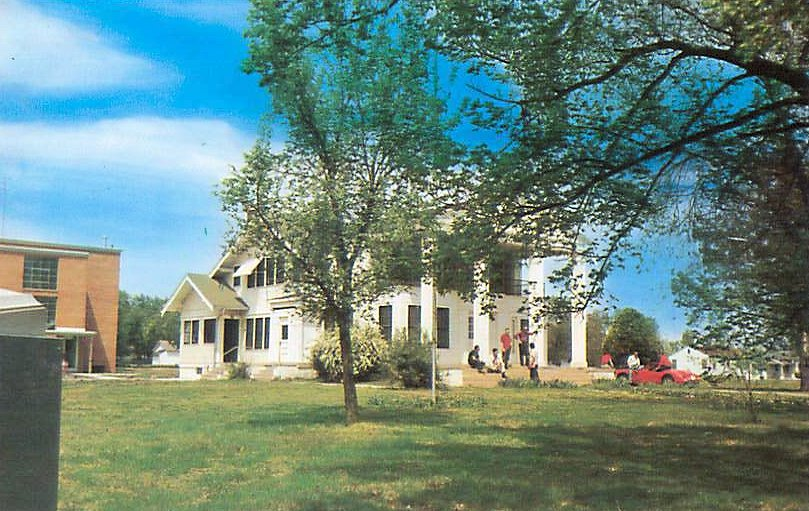
Former Utopia College (1965)

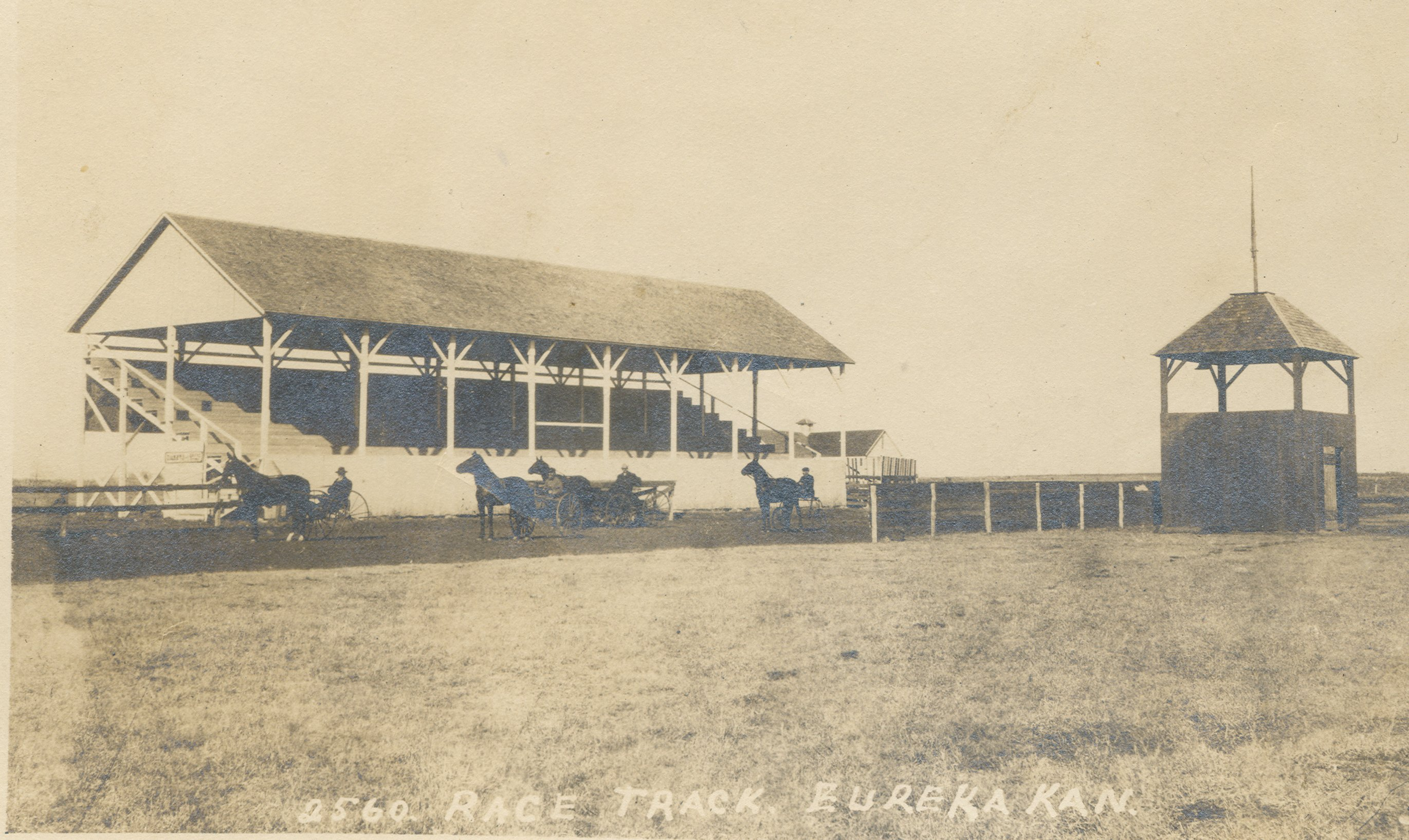
Former Eureka Downs (1910)

== See also ==
- National Register of Historic Places listings in Greenwood County, Kansas
  - Eureka Atchison, Topeka and Santa Fe Railroad Depot
  - Eureka Carnegie Library
  - Greenwood Hotel
  - Robertson House
