= Eric Smith (Kansas politician) =

American politician

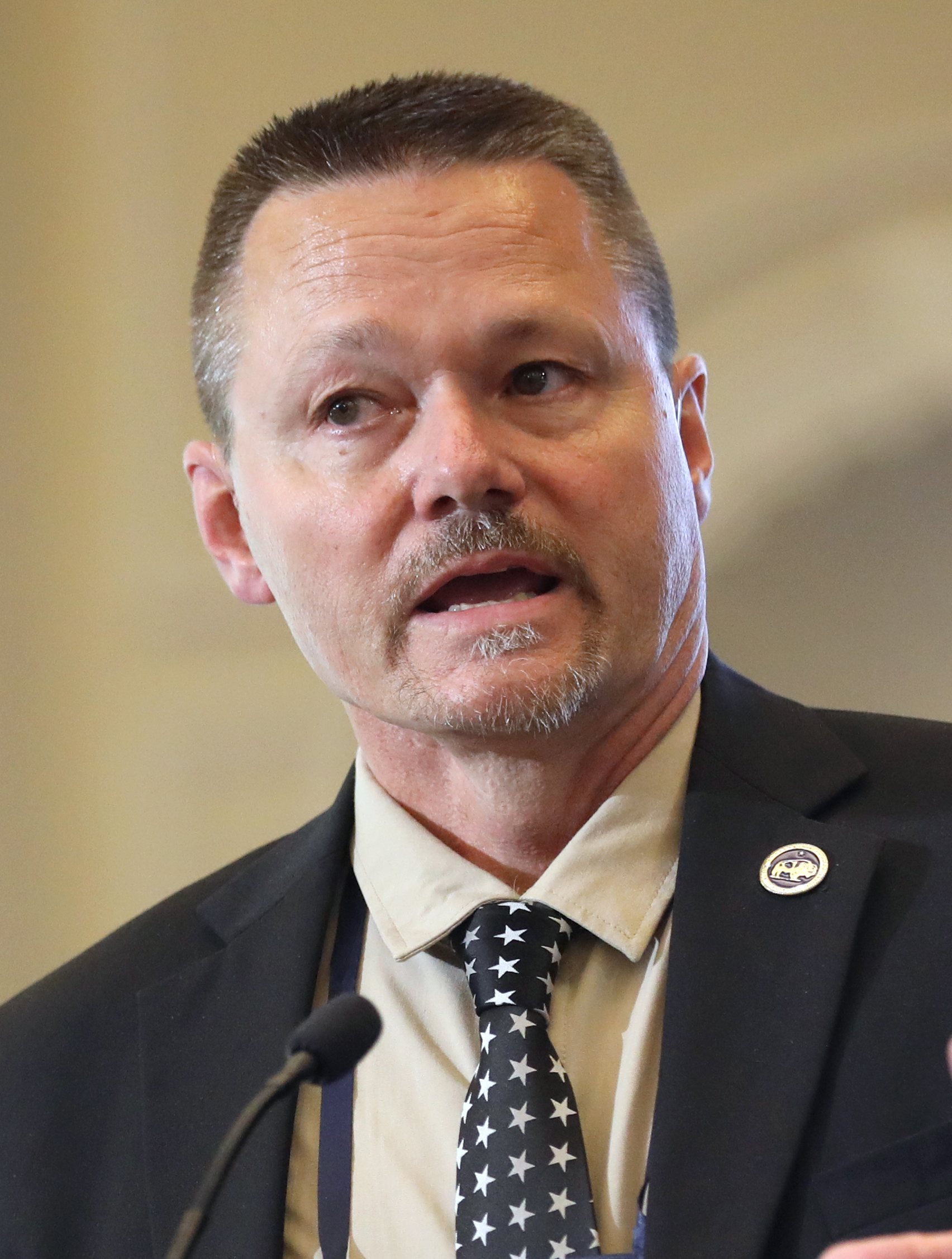

Member of the Kansas House of Representatives from the 76th district
- In office January 9, 2017 – January 13, 2025
- Preceded by: Peggy Mast
- Succeeded by: Bradley Barrett

Personal details
- Born: December 2, 1966 (age 59) Eureka, Kansas, U.S.
- Party: Republican
- Spouse: Rebecca
- Children: 6
- Education: Community College of the Air Force (AS); Liberty University (BS)

Military service
- Branch/service: United States Air Force
- Years of service: 1988–1992

Eric L. Smith (born December 2, 1966) is an American politician and law enforcement officer who served as a member of the Kansas House of Representatives from the 76th district. Elected in November 2016, he assumed office on January 9, 2017, and did not run for re-election in 2024.

== Early life and education ==
Smith was born in Eureka, Kansas. He earned an associate's degree in electronics and minutemen weapon systems from the Community College of the Air Force in 1991 and a Bachelor of Science in criminal justice and corrections from Liberty University.

== Career ==
From 1988 to 1992, Smith served as an electro-mechanical technician in the United States Air Force. From 2001 to 2009, he was a security officer at the Wolf Creek Generating Station in Coffey County, Kansas. From 2012 to 2015, Smith served as an officer with the Lebo, Kansas Police Department. He has also served as a deputy sheriff with the Coffey County Sheriff's Office. He was elected to the Kansas House of Representatives in November 2016 and assumed office on January 9, 2017. Since 2019, Smith has served as vice chair of the House Agriculture Committee and chair of the House Kansas Security Committee.
