= Peggy Mast =

American politician (born 1948)

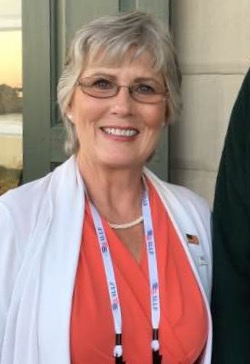
- Mast in 2016

Member of the Kansas House of Representatives from the 76th district
- In office January 13, 1997 – January 9, 2017
- Preceded by: Raymond Arthur Luthi
- Succeeded by: Eric Smith

Personal details
- Born: August 20, 1948 (age 78) Norton, Kansas, U.S.
- Party: Republican

Peggy L. Mast (born August 20, 1948) is an American Republican politician who served as a member of the Kansas House of Representatives representing the 76th district. She served from 1997 to 2017, and finished her career as the Speaker of the House pro tempore.

== Career ==
Mast was born in Norton, Kansas. She has attended Butler County Community College, Emporia State University, Fort Hays State University, Flint Hills Vocational-Technical, and was previously a school bus driver, worked for Emporia Zoo, Arnold Staffing Services, and Design Rite Contracting.

She has been a member of a number of organizations, including American Business Women's Association, Prairie Hens Unit, Kansas Cattlewoman's Association, Republican Women's Organization, and Alliance to Recognize and End Abuse.

While she was serving in the Kansas House of Representatives, she was a lead sponsor of an anti-Sharia bill. She also led a committee that considered a bill aimed at blocking Muslim refugees from the state due to security concerns.

=== Committee membership ===
Representative Mast served on the following legislative committees:

- Calendar and Printing
- Interstate Cooperation (vice-chair)
- Joint Committee on Kansas Security
- Legislative Budget
- Legislative Coordinating Council
- Legislative Post Audit Committee
- Social Services Budget (vice-chair)

== Activism ==
Mast has served as director of outreach of former FBI agent John Guandolo's organization Understanding the Threat, designated as an anti-Muslim "hate group" by the Southern Poverty Law Center, and described as a part of the counter-jihad movement. She has held presentations for the group where she has talked about perceived threats to the country from groups such as Black Lives Matter, Antifa, and the Council on American-Islamic Relations (CAIR), which has been met by protesters.

On October 20, 2016, she was widely criticized by peers and national news, by seemingly praising a quote from Adolf Hitler while comparing him to Planned Parenthood. She said, "Great quote from Hitler in the video. Please listen to it closely. His words are profound! Let’s start using discernment." She later clarified that her intent was to criticize Planned Parenthood for allegedly using the same tactics as Hitler.

== Personal life ==
Mast is married, and has four children, and three stepchildren.
