= Bradley Barrett =

American politician

Member of the Kansas House of Representatives from the 76th district
- Incumbent
- Assumed office January 13, 2025
- Preceded by: Eric Smith

Personal details
- Party: Republican
- Profession: Attorney
- Website: vote4barrett.com House Website

Bradley Barrett is an American politician from Kansas who currently represents the 76th district of the Kansas House of Representatives. He is a Republican.

== Biography ==
Barrett was born on a farm in Linn County and worked as a volunteer firefighter through college and started working as a corrections officer at his local jail at 20. He joined the police patrol division at 21 filling multiple roles such as Deputy Sheriff and Special Investigator.

Barrett sought to succeed retiring Republican member of the Kansas House of Representatives Eric Smith in the 2024 election. Barrett would be unopposed in both the primary and general elections.

== Personal life ==
Bradley has been married to his wife Sarah Barrett since March 2024.
