= Kathy Patrick =

Kathy L. Patrick
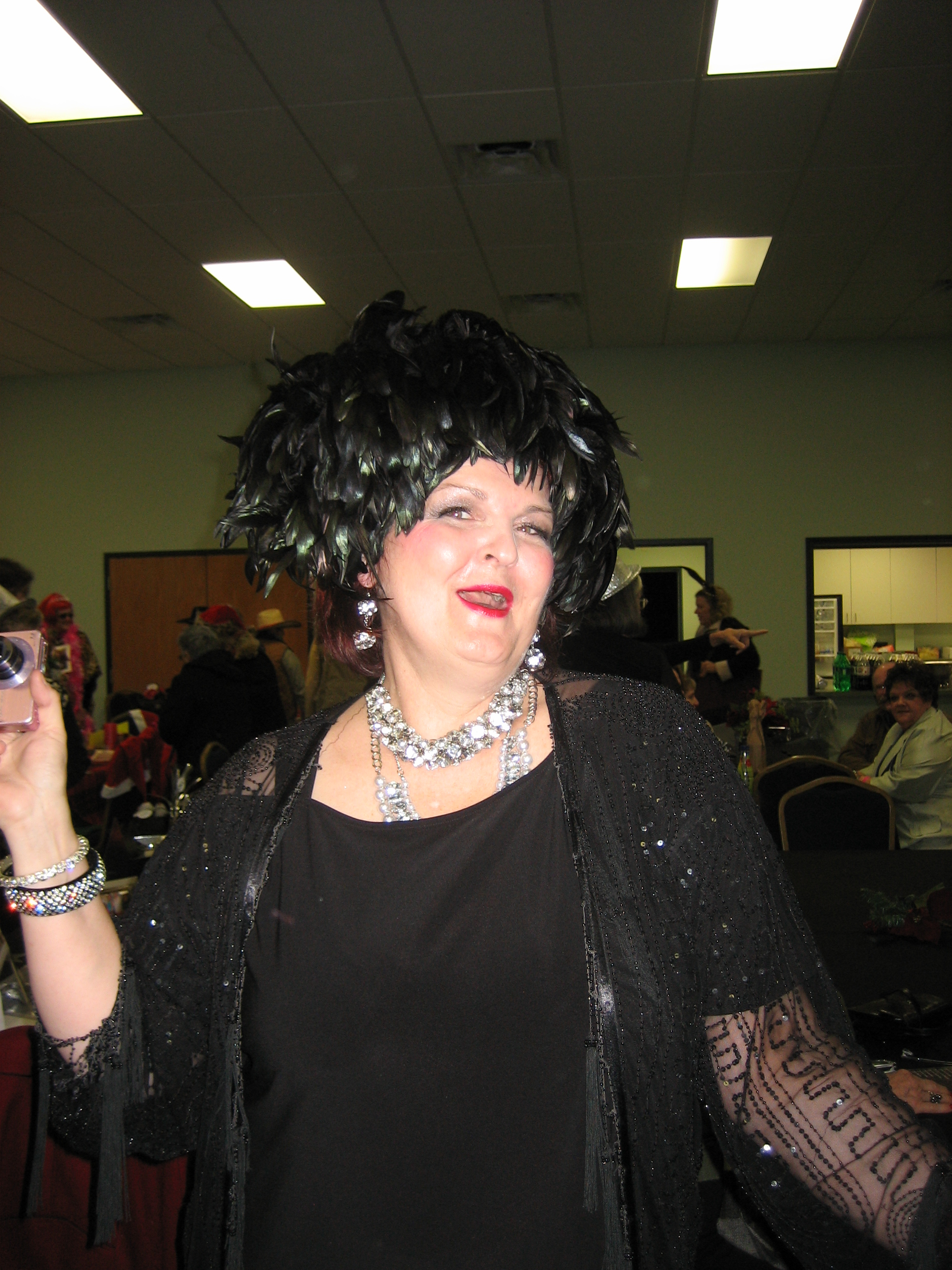
- Kathy L. Patrick dressed as Auntie Mame at the Pulpwood Queens Girlfriend Weekend 2011
- Born: Eureka, Kansas
- Occupations: Author, founder of Pulpwood Queens book club
- Writing career
- Genres: Fiction, non-fiction
- Notable works: The Pulpwood Queen's Tiara-Wearing, Book-Sharing Guide to Life
- Website: beautyandthebook.com

Kathy L. Patrick is an author, hairdresser, founder of Pulpwood Queens Book Club, and owner of the Jefferson, Texas, hair salon/bookstore, Beauty and the Book. She was born and raised in Kansas.

== Personal background ==
Patrick graduated in 1974 from Eureka High School in Eureka, Kansas. She lives on the outskirts of Jefferson with her husband Jay. They have two children, Madeleine Patrick, and Laynii Patrick.

== Career ==
While attending college—a total of seven universities, including Emporia State University and Texas A&M University—she worked as a hairdresser, later landing work in the publishing industry. She opened Beauty and the Book in 1999 after losing her job as a book sales representative. Oxford American magazine sent author Carol Dawson to the shop to cover the grand opening, dubbed "Perms and Prose." The resulting article, titled "Hairdresser to the Authors," put Patrick's salon and book store on the map.

In 2008, she wrote the nonfiction book The Pulpwood Queen's Tiara-Wearing, Book-Sharing Guide to Life.

In 2011, Random House announced it was planning a 12-episode season for an online book club talk show, featuring interviews with Random House authors. The company spokesman said the show was created "in response to increased demand for digital content from book clubs."

Patrick appeared on Good Morning America's "Recipe Show" with her chicken shish kabob recipe. She also appeared on radio on the Kacey Kowars Show in January 2008. For one season, she hosted her own talk show, Beauty and the Book, which debuted on HGTV in March 2009, and was listed in HGTV's Top 10.

Texas Monthly magazine featured Patrick in its January 2008 issue, after the release of her book. The next month, she was interviewed for a feature article in The Debutante's Ball, a blog about debut authors.

She was runner-up in 2010 of MediaBistro's Dancing with the Stars reader vote after it launched "Should Authors Dance?" for a writer to be cast on the popular reality show.

== Speaking appearances ==
Patrick was a panelist at the Texas Book Festival in October 2010, and at the 2009 AJC Decatur Book Festival in Georgia. Also in 2009, she was a speaker at the Louisiana Book Festival. as well as a speaker at the Author! Author! Book Festival in Shreveport, Louisiana, in June 2009.
