= Westside Service Station and Riverside Motel =

- U.S. National Register of Historic Places
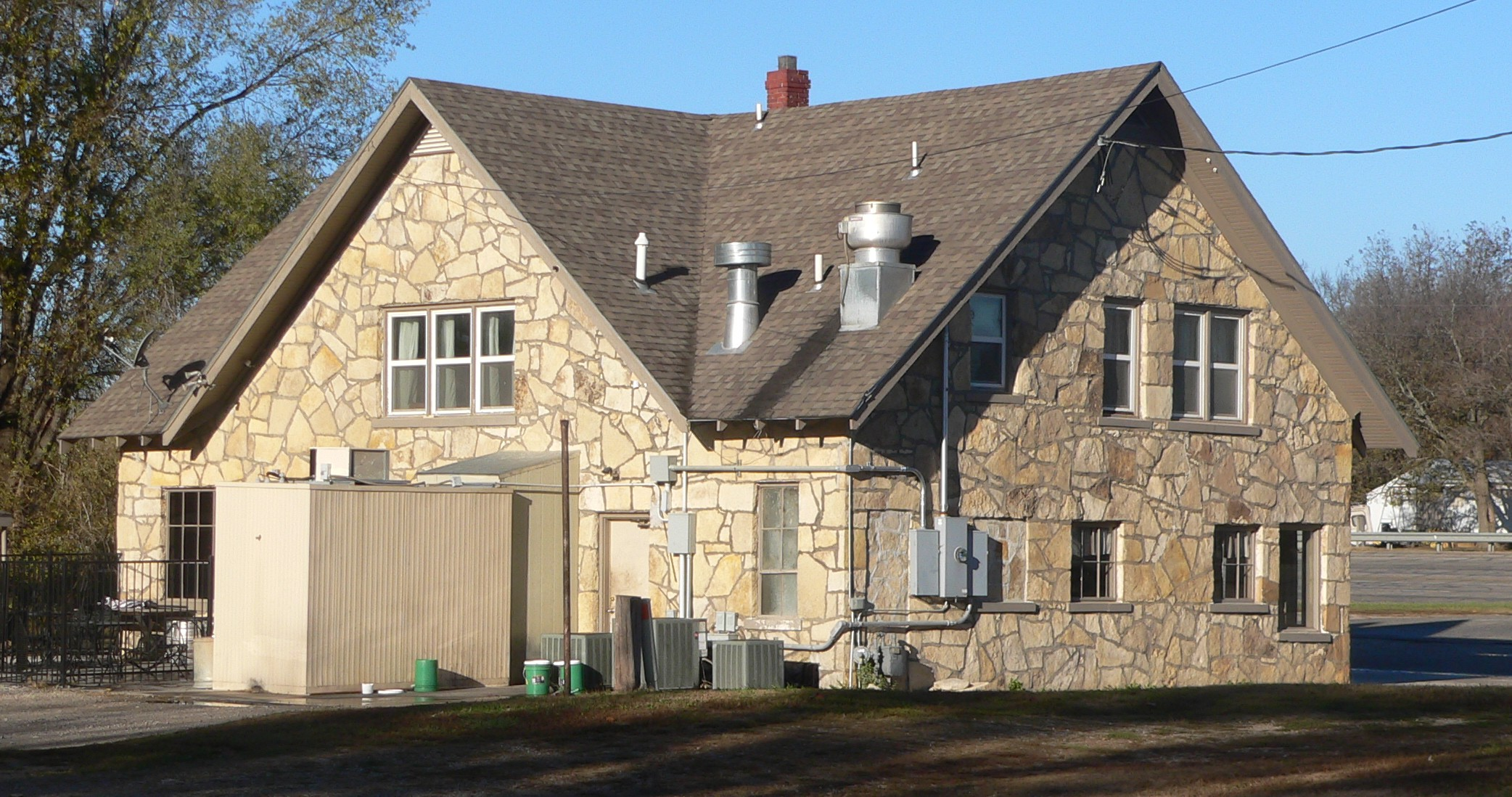

- Location within Kansas
- Location: 325 W. River St., Eureka, Kansas
- Coordinates: 37°49′02″N 96°17′54″W
- Area: 1 acre (0.40 ha)
- Built: 1939
- Built by: Lloyd Ryther & Glen Handley (motel buildings)
- Architectural style: Ozark Giraffe
- MPS: Roadside Kansas MPS
- NRHP reference No.: 12000248
- Added to NRHP: May 1, 2012

The Westside Service Station and Riverside Motel, at 325 W. River St. in Eureka, Kansas, was built in 1939. It was listed on the National Register of Historic Places in 2012.

The complex includes:

- an office and café building built in 1939, which has a steeply pitched roof as in Tudor Revival-style buildings.
- one-story Ranch-style motel building (c.1950-55)
- three woodframe sleeping cabins with attached carports, faced with limestone "reflecting a common regional architectural style known as Ozark Giraffe".
