= Greenwood Hotel =

- U.S. National Register of Historic Places
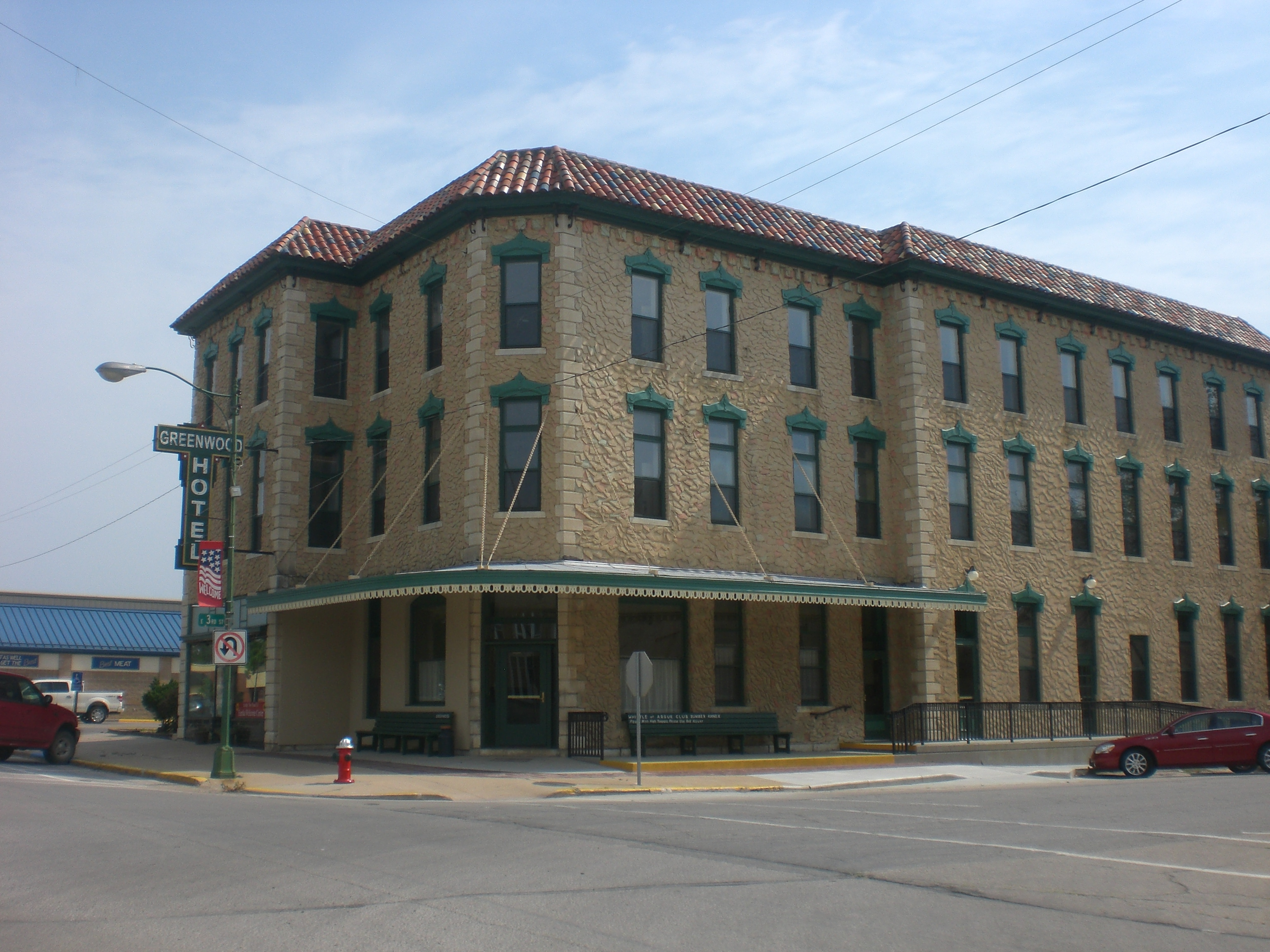
- Greenwood Hotel in 2012

- Location within Kansas Location within the United States
- Location: 300 N. Main Street, Eureka, Kansas
- Coordinates: 37°49′17″N 96°17′36″W
- Area: Less than one acre
- Built: 1883
- Architect: Charles W. Squires
- Architectural style: Mission/Spanish Colonial Revival
- NRHP reference No.: 06000769
- Added to NRHP: September 6, 2006

Greenwood Hotel is a historic building at 300 N. Main Street in Eureka, Kansas, United States. The brick structure was constructed in 1882, to house visitors involved in the burgeoning cattle industry in the area. Owner H.D. Hover renovated the hotel in 1926 to its current external appearance with a remodel that reflected the Spanish Mission Revival style. To celebrate the grand reopening, a celebration dinner was held on September 23, 1926, with great fanfare. This event eventually became known as Cattlemen's Day and has been celebrated annually ever since on the first Saturday of November.

It was listed on the National Register of Historic Places in 2006.
