= Santa Fe Trail (disambiguation) =

Santa Fe Trail is a historic 19th century transportation route.

Santa Fe Trail may also refer to:

- Santa Fe National Historic Trail, National Historic Trail through Missouri, Kansas, Oklahoma, Colorado, and New Mexico, USA
- Santa Fe Trail Scenic and Historic Byway, National Scenic Byway in Colorado, USA
- Santa Fe Trail Scenic Byway, National Scenic Byway in New Mexico, USA
- Santa Fe Trail (film), a 1940 American Western film
- Santa Fe Trail (short subjects) a 1943–1945 Warner Bros short subjects Western series with Robert Shayne
- Santa Fe Trails, the local transit authority in Santa Fe, New Mexico
- The Santa Fe Trail (1923 film), a 1923 Western film serial
- The Santa Fe Trail (1930 film), a 1930 American pre-Code western film
- New Santa Fe Trail, an auto trail
- Santa Fe Trail problem, genetic programming exercise
