= Enrique Marzal =

Spanish dressmaker (1940–2025)

Enrique Marzal Santafé (15 September 1940 – 6 June 2025) was a Spanish clothing designer and dressmaker.

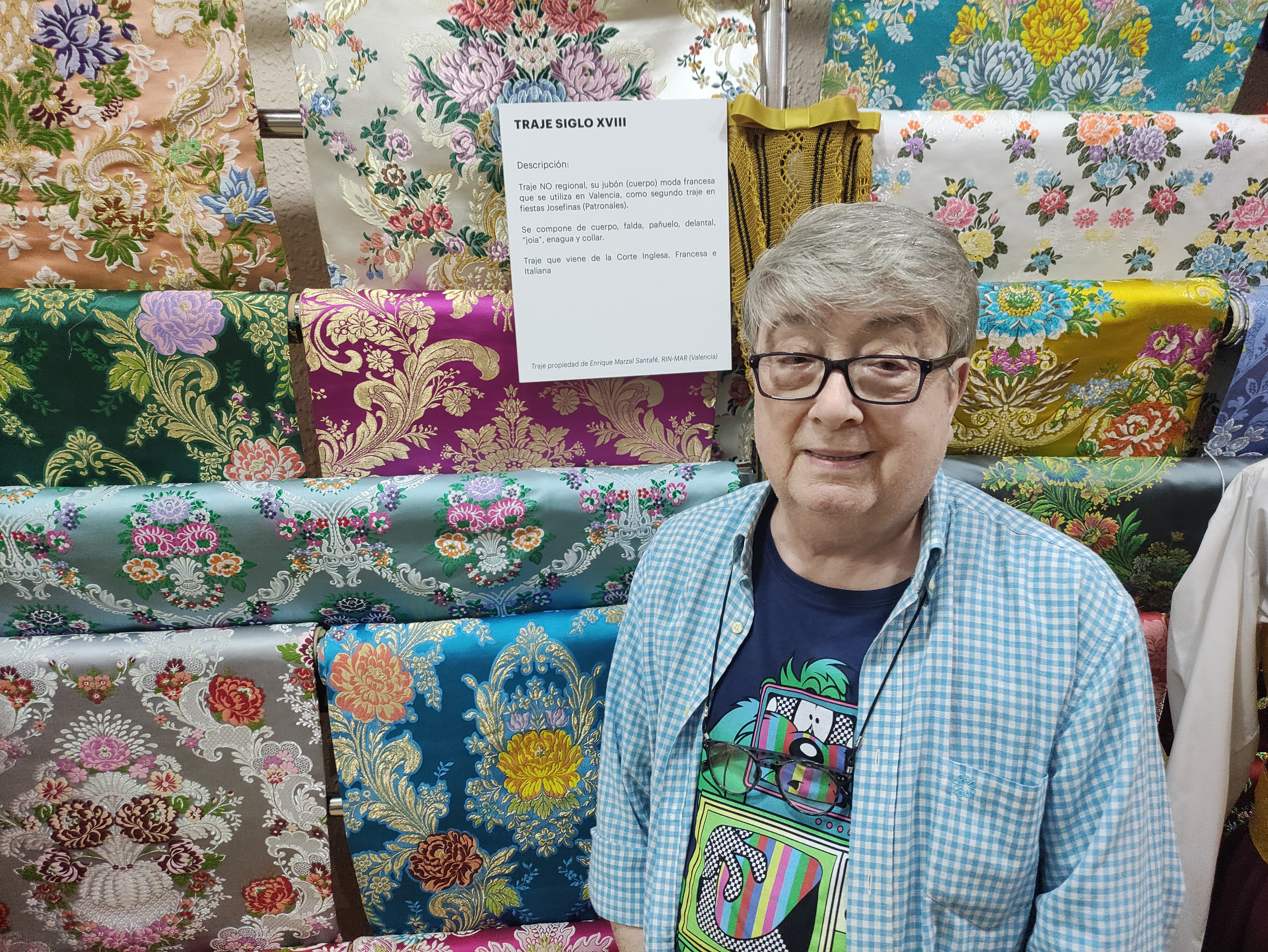
Marzal in 2023

== Life and career ==
Marzal was born on 15 September 1940 in Valencia. His interest in clothing was born from a Valencian costume that his mother made for her daughter in 1946. From a young age he met Concha Piquer, whom he dressed. Marzal was linked to Casa Insa until 1972, when he became independent. He worked for the Spanish Royal Family and celebrities like Lola Flores, Carmen Sevilla, Norma Duval, Rocío Jurado, Lina Morgan and others.

Marzal celebrated his 80th birthday and golden business anniversary in 2021.

Marzal died on 6 June 2025, at the age of 84.
