= Baldwin City station =

Historic railroad depot in Kansas, US

- Baldwin City Santa Fe Depot
- U.S. National Register of Historic Places
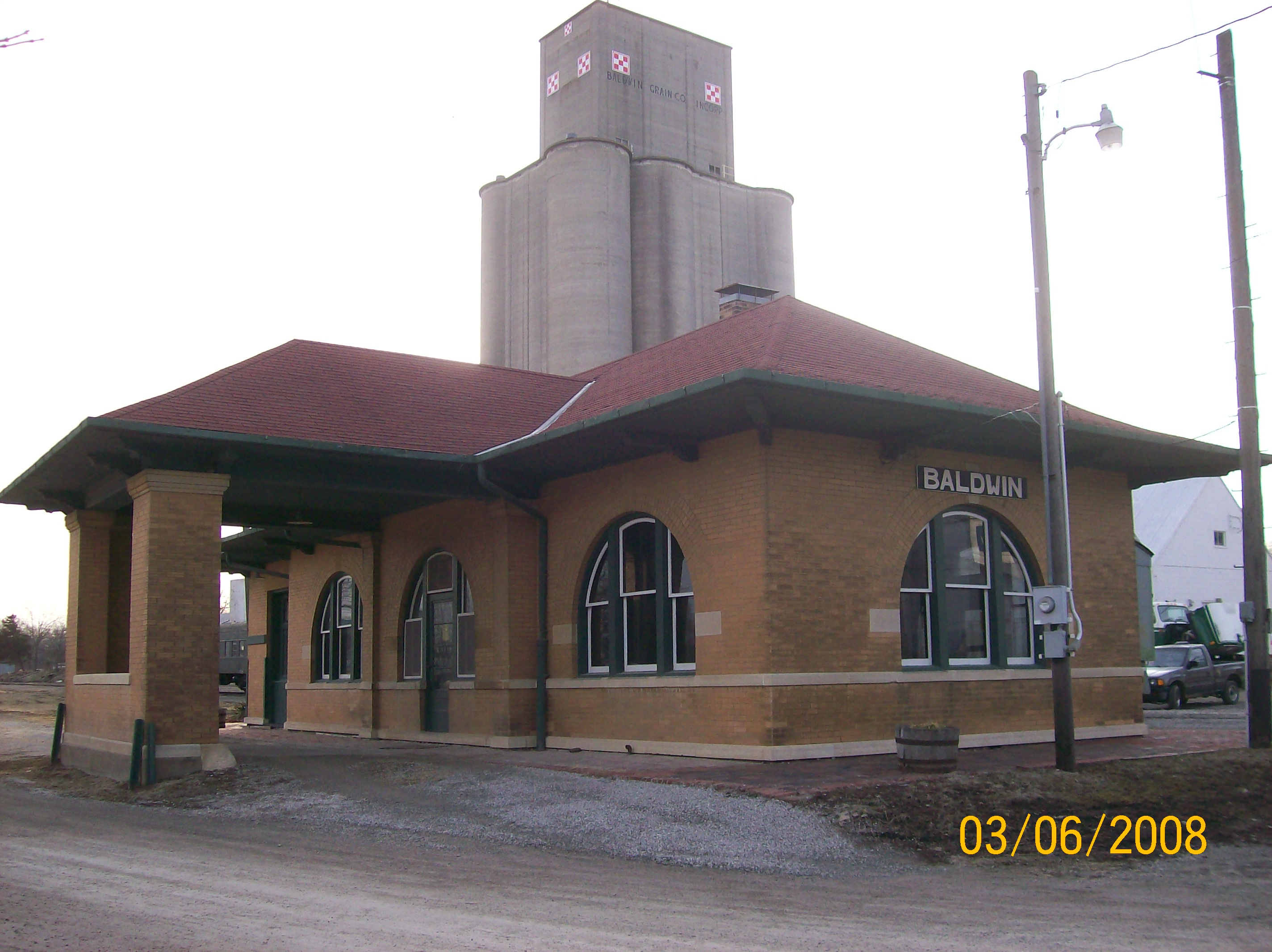

- Location within Kansas Location within the United States
- Location: 1601 High Street; Baldwin City, Kansas
- Coordinates: 38°46′29″N 95°12′04″W
- Built: January 1907
- Architect: Atchison, Topeka & Santa Fe Railway
- NRHP reference No.: 83000424
- Added to NRHP: January 3, 1983

The Baldwin City station, nominated as the Santa Fe Depot, is a historic railroad depot building at 1601 High Street in Baldwin City, Kansas. The depot was on the Lawrence to Ottawa line of the Atchison, Topeka and Santa Fe Railway. It was built to replace a wood frame depot, which was deemed inadequate for the growing city. Upon the urging of the mayor of Baldwin City, the Santa Fe in 1906 simultaneously funded new depots in El Dorado, Argentine, and Baldwin City, along with a park across the street from the to be completed Baldwin City depot. Construction began in July 1906 and finished in January 1907.

Passenger service to the depot ended in the mid-1950s, with freight service ending a decade later. The station was added to the National Register of Historic Places on January 3, 1983.

Preceding station	Atchison, Topeka and Santa Fe Railway	Following station
Nowhere toward Ottawa	Ottawa – Lawrence	Vinland toward Lawrence
