= Pulpwood Queens =

Coordinates: 32.759°N 94.351°W

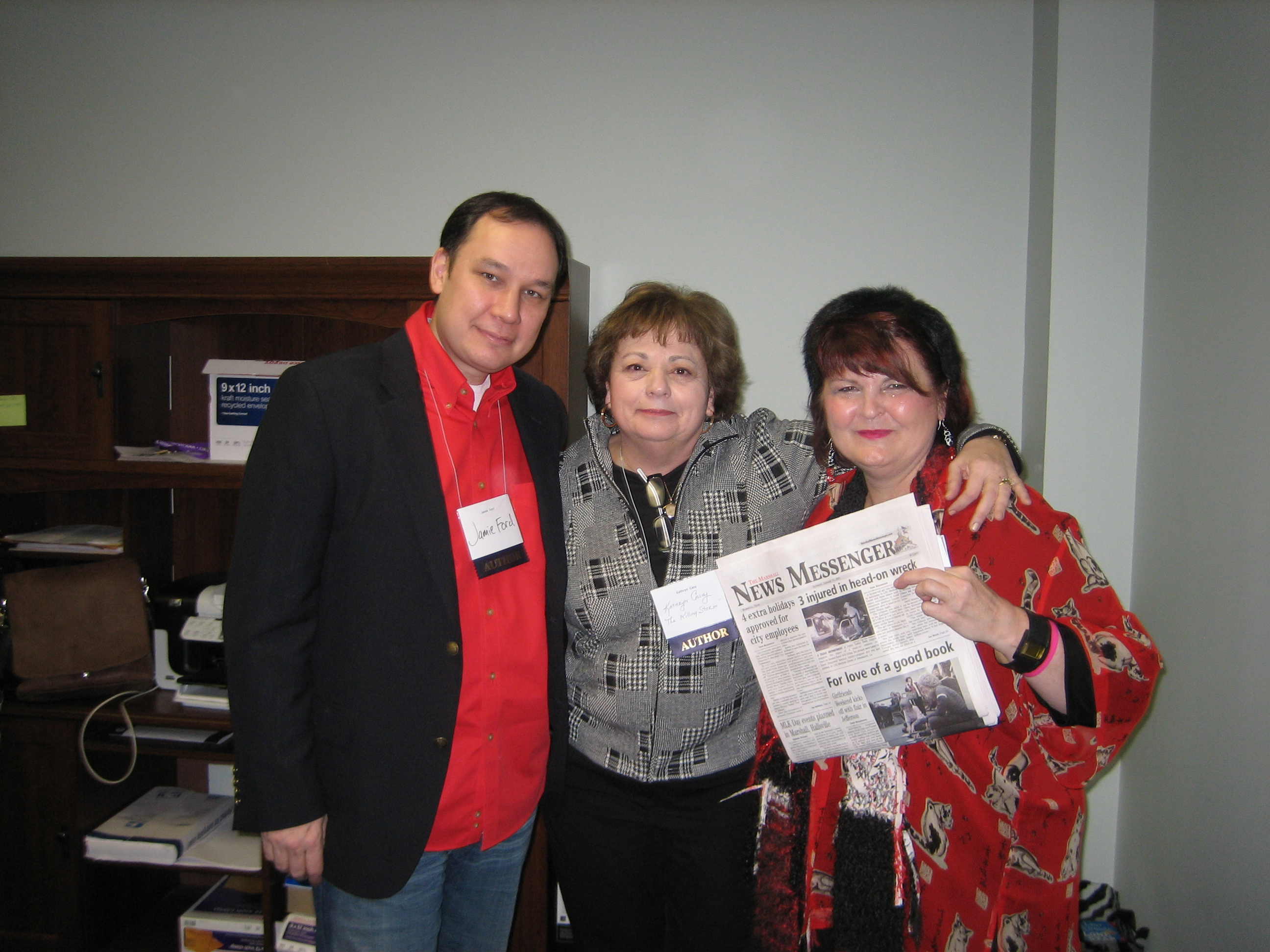
- Authors Jamie Ford and Kathryn Casey with founder Kathy Patrick, in 2011
- Formation: 2000; 26 years ago
- Founder: Kathy L. Patrick
- Headquarters: Jefferson, Texas, US
- Members: 2,000
- Website: pulpwoodqueen.com

The Pulpwood Queens is a meet-and-greet book club founded in early 2000 in Jefferson, Texas, by Kathy L. Patrick in a combined beauty salon and bookstore, Beauty and the Book. In a joint effort with Random House, the club spawned an Internet book club show that began in January 2011, Beauty and the Book: Where Reading is Always in Style.

== History ==
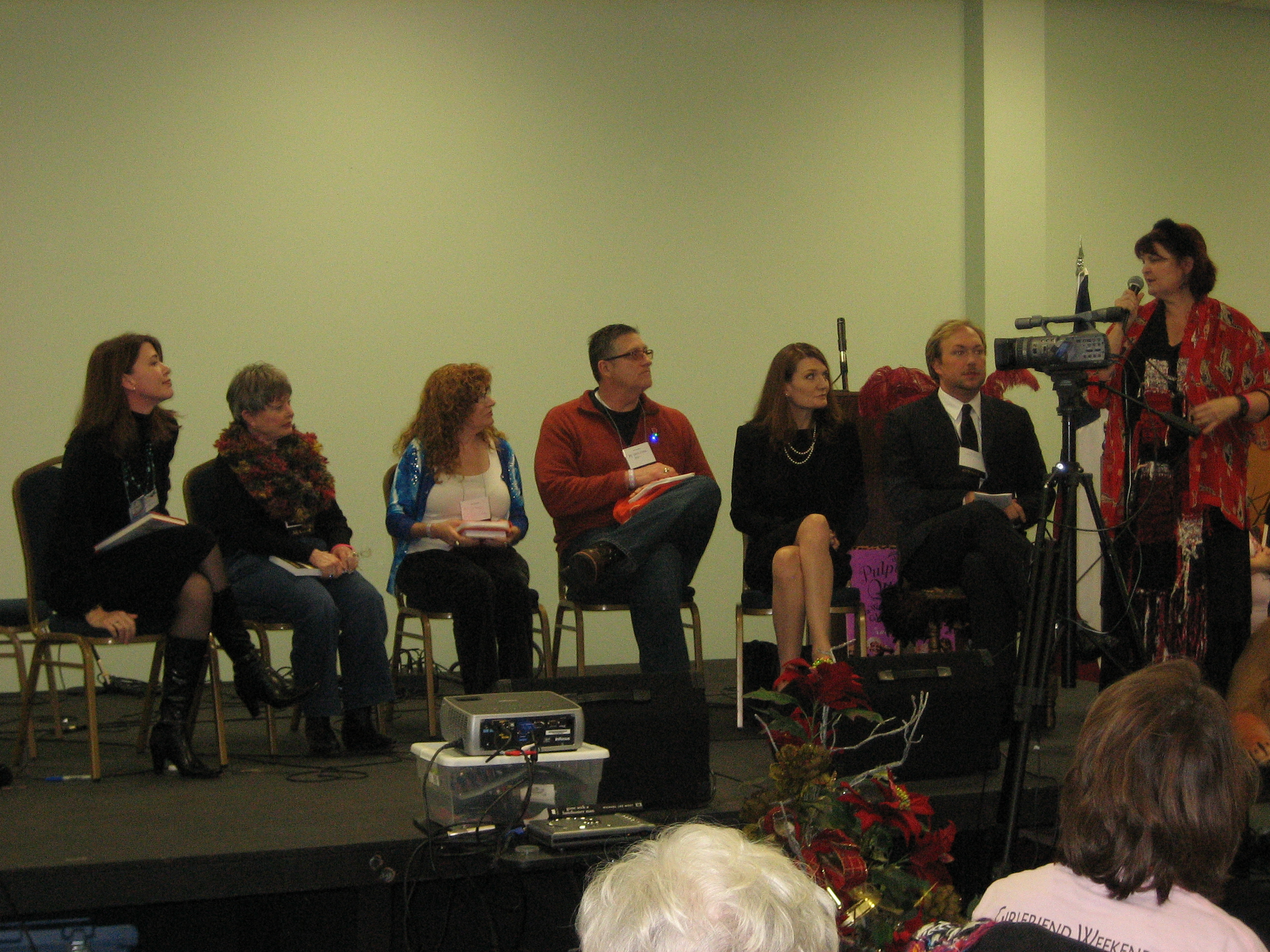
Kathy L. Patrick (far right) leading an author panel including NY Times bestselling author Jeannette Walls (third from the right)

Dedicated to promoting literacy and good literature, Pulpwood Queens has grown from an initial six members to, a decade later, more than 2,000 members and 400 chapters, including 10 in foreign countries and one in a women's prison. The club selects a "book of the month," which Variety reporter Jonathan Bing said "has an unusual amount of clout."

In June 2002, members of the book club appeared on ABC's Good Morning America with the introduction, "These Southern ladies are devotees of cocktails, good food, and high hair."

== Girlfriend Weekend ==
Its annual convention, Girlfriend Weekend, is held each January. Pat Conroy, author of The Prince of Tides and South of Broad, was a keynote speaker at the 2010 conference. Conroy returned in 2011 and was joined by 40 other authors, including New York Times bestsellers Fannie Flagg, author of Fried Green Tomatoes at the Whistlestop Cafe, Jamie Ford, who penned Hotel on the Corner of Bitter and Sweet, and Jeannette Walls, whose first book, The Glass Castle, stayed on the New York Times bestseller list for 100 weeks. As a result, the 2011 event sold out.

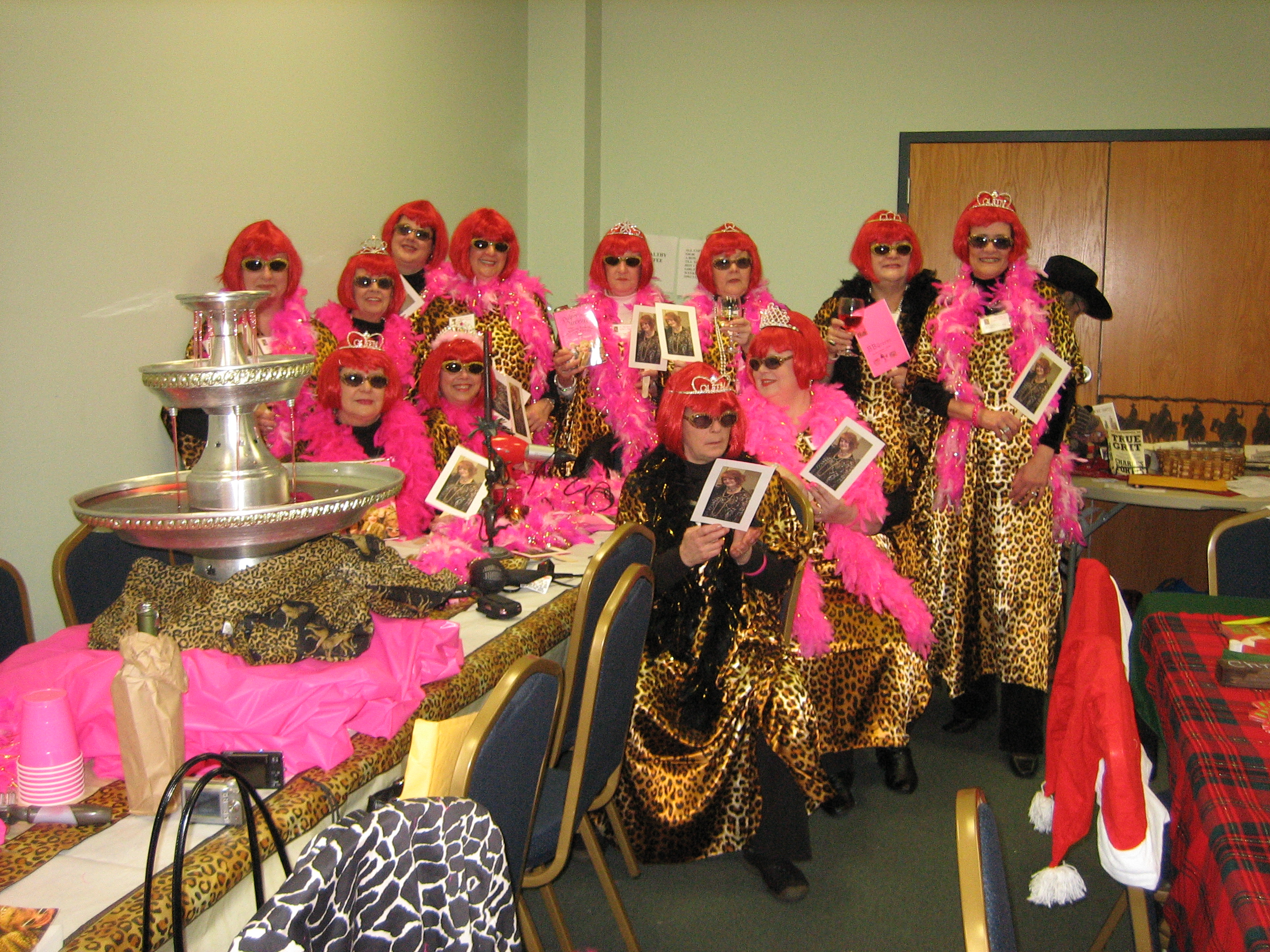
Pulpwood Queens dressed in costume at The Great Big Ball of Hair Ball 2011

The final night of Girlfriend Weekend is The Great Big Ball of Hair Ball, where club members and authors wear costumes based on a theme. In 2010, the party celebrated The Wizard of Oz. The theme of the 2011 event was "It's all about the story," and attendees dressed as characters from their favorite books.

In a February 2010 article, the Texas Observer described the weekend as "fast becoming one of the most important literary events in America." And the Marshall News Messenger, in Marshall, Texas, wrote that the event is for men too, with members known as the Timber Guys.

== The book club ==
Pulpwood Queens was included in a 2002 Newsweek article about book clubs. In it, Newsweek reported that when Patrick, chosen by "Good Morning America" to select the first book on the morning show's televised book club, announced that the Pulpwood Queens had picked Ann Packer's debut novel, The Dive From Clausen's Pier, it sent the book "straight up the best-seller list."

In 2007, The Dallas Morning News called the club "a major publishing force."

Authors Inga Wiehl and Ellie Heffernan, in their book When Professional Women Retire: Food for Thought and Palate, wrote about Pulpwood Queens, saying, "This group is not just any old book club. It carries some freight." Then they cited the club's reading choice of The Dive From Clausen's Pier that "sent sales skyrocketing."
