= USS Santa Fe =

Two ships of the United States Navy have been named USS Santa Fe, after the city of Santa Fe, New Mexico.

- The first USS Santa Fe (CL-60) was a light cruiser that saw much action in the Pacific during World War II.
- The second USS Santa Fe (SSN-763) is a Los Angeles-class nuclear attack submarine commissioned in 1994.
