= Strong City station =

- Strong City Atchison, Topeka, & Santa Fe Depot
- U.S. National Register of Historic Places
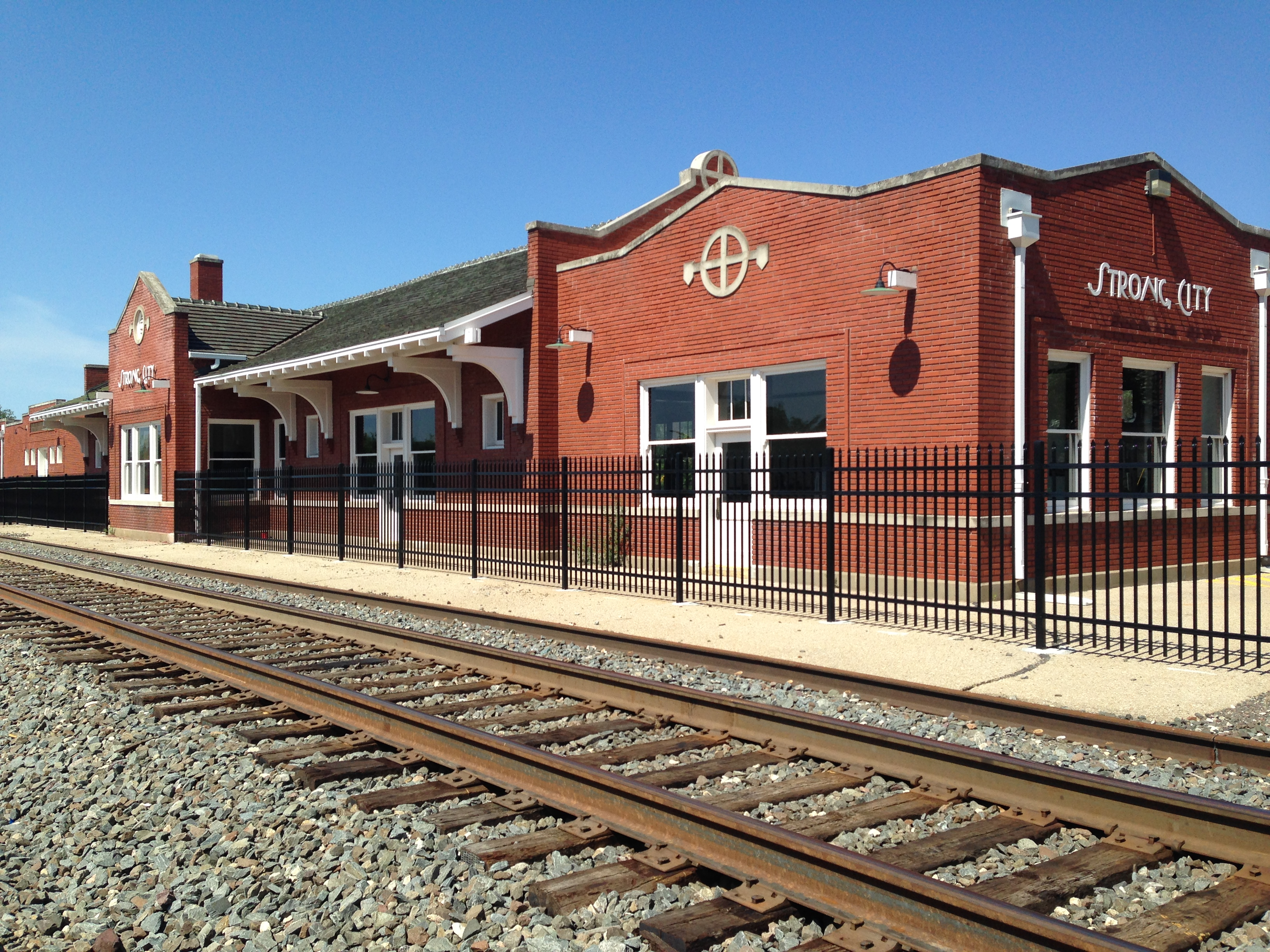

- Location within Kansas
- Location: 102 West Topeka Avenue, Strong City, Kansas
- Coordinates: 38°23′42″N 96°32′24″W
- Area: less than one acre
- Built: 1913
- Built by: Atchison, Topeka and Santa Fe Railway
- Architectural style: Craftsman, Mission Revival
- MPS: Railroad Resources of Kansas MPS
- NRHP reference No.: 07000607
- Added to NRHP: June 27, 2007

The Strong City Atchison, Topeka & Santa Fe Depot is a historic railway station at 102 West Topeka Avenue in Strong City, Kansas. The station was built by the Atchison, Topeka and Santa Fe Railway (ATSF) in 1913 to replace the city's previous station. The ATSF first built a line through the city in 1872, bypassing the county seat of Cottonwood Falls. To honor the railroad, the city changed its name from Cottonwood Station to Strong City in 1881 for ATSF vice president William Barstow Strong. Strong City's first railroad station was a simple wood building, and after a 1902 fire the town replaced it with a board-and-batten structure. In the early 1910s, the ATSF began replacing the stations in its most important stops with permanent brick buildings; the new stations were known as county-seat depots, as they typically served a county seat or the most important station in a county. The Strong City depot is typical of the ATSF's corporate architecture at the time and includes elements of the American Craftsman and Mission Revival styles. It served passenger trains until the late 1940s and continued to function as a railway office for many years afterward.

The station was added to the National Register of Historic Places on June 27, 2007.

Preceding station	Atchison, Topeka and Santa Fe Railway	Following station
Neva toward Los Angeles	Main Line	Ellinor toward Chicago
