= ARA Santa Fe =

Several ships of the Argentine Navy have been named ARA Santa Fe after the Santa Fe Province of Argentina:

- ARA Santa Fe (1896), British-built (Yarrow Shipbuilders, London) Corrientes-class torpedo boat destroyer, one of four vessels based on the Havock-class destroyer, but sunk and lost off Uruguay 1897.
- ARA Santa Fe (1911) a San Luis-class destroyer launched in 1911 but sold to Greece before acceptance in 1912.
- ARA Santa Fe (S-1), a Santa Fe-class submarine built in Italy and commissioned in 1933, which served until 1956 when it was scrapped.
- ARA Santa Fe (S-11), the former USS Macabi, a submarine was acquired in 1960 and scrapped in 1974.
- ARA Santa Fe (S-21), formerly USS Catfish, a submarine commissioned in 1971 and served until 1982 when she was captured by the British during the Falklands War and scuttled in 1985.
- ARA Santa Fe (S-43), was a TR-1700-class submarine that was never completed due to the Argentine economic crisis of the 1980s.
