= Robertson House (Eureka, Kansas) =

Historic house in Kansas, United States

- U.S. National Register of Historic Places
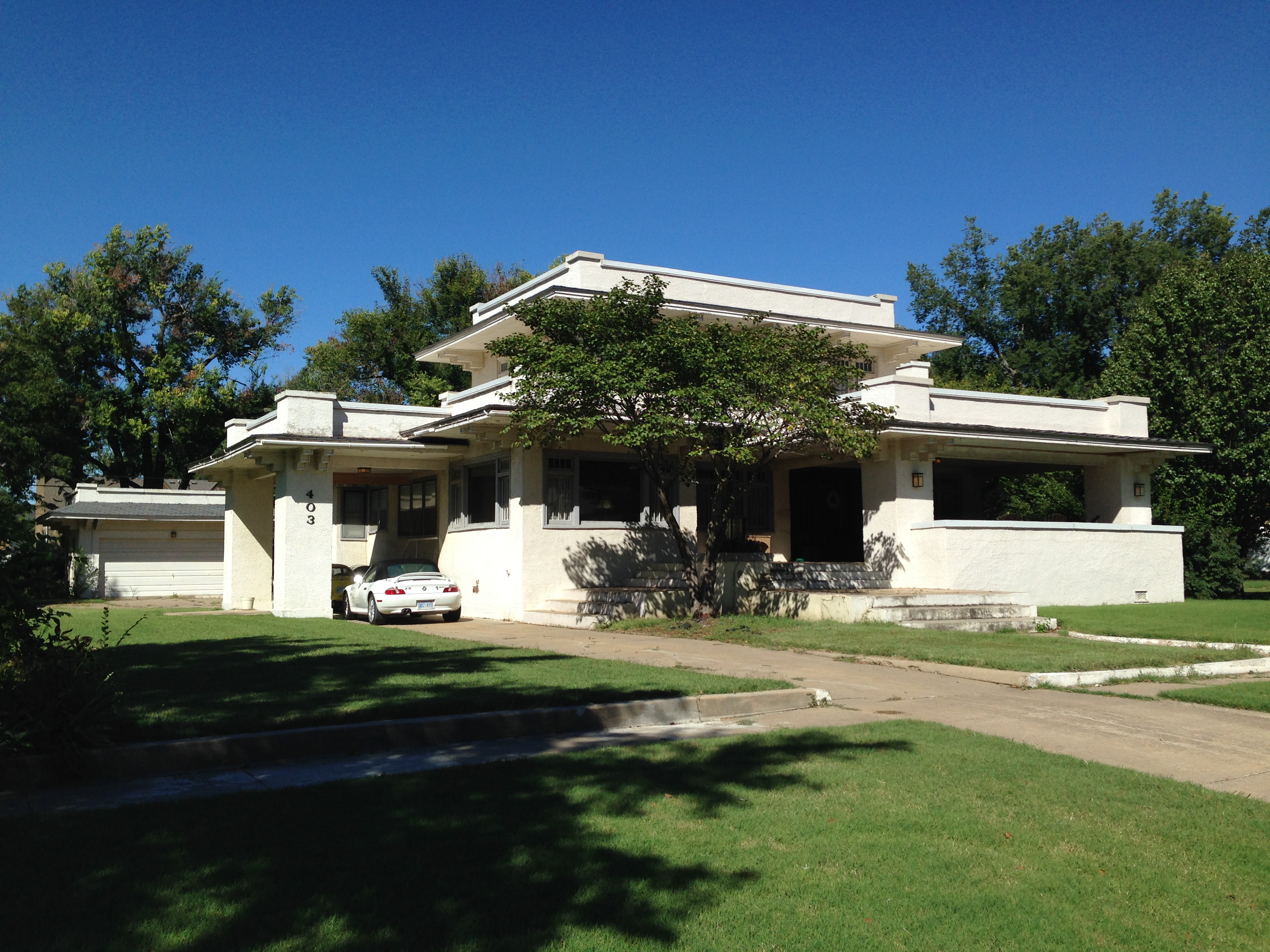

- Location within Kansas Location within the United States
- Location: 403 N. Plum Street, Eureka, Kansas
- Coordinates: 37°49′21″N 96°17′0″W
- Built: 1923
- Architectural style: Prairie Style
- NRHP reference No.: 10001207
- Added to NRHP: February 7, 2011

Robertson House is a historic house at 403 N Plum Street in Eureka, Kansas.

The history of the Robertson House parallels the rise and fall of the Kansas oil industry. The home's eclectic Prairie-style design, unique in Kansas, reflected the owner's financial success. When he built the home in 1923 at a cost of $40,000, oil drill contractor Russell Roy Robertson likely believed that oil prices would remain steady. For the first time, oil workers, who had lived in temporary company towns, began to take permanent residence in oil towns like Eureka. In the words of historian Craig Miner, "Oil had become respectable during the 1920s."

The Robertson House likely seemed affordable to oil contractor Roy Clair Patton, who bought the property from Robertson at the dawn of the Great Depression. But when drillers flooded the market, oil prices plunged and yields fell, those who made their living drilling oil wells could no longer afford it. By 1933, the price of oil had tanked to just 66 cents and the house was sold at sheriff's sale. The property was nominated for its association with the local oil industry and for its eclectic Prairie and Mission styles.
