= Eureka Carnegie Library =

- U.S. National Register of Historic Places
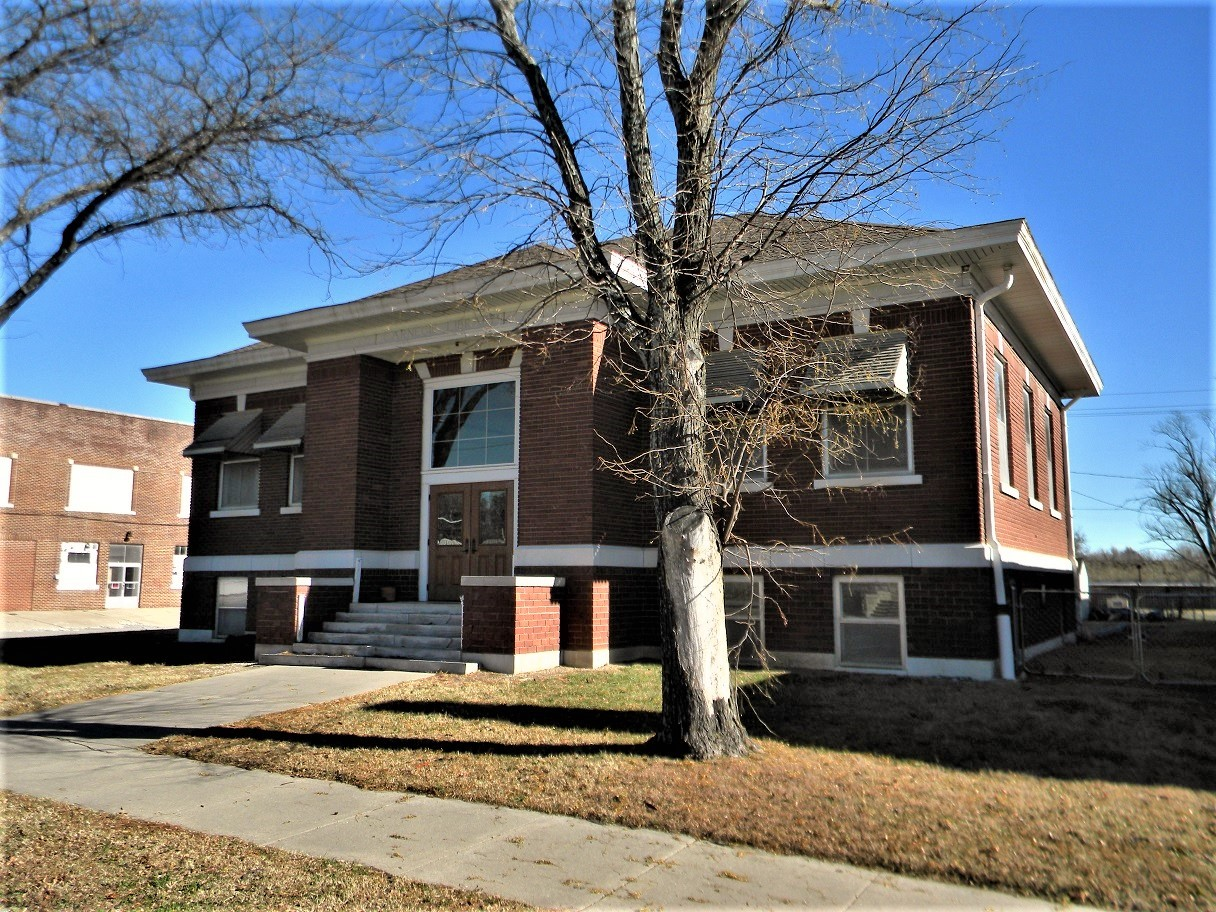

- Location within Kansas Location within the United States
- Location: 520 N. Main; Eureka, Kansas
- Coordinates: 37°49′29″N 96°17′23″W
- Area: less than one acre
- Built: 1914
- Built by: Teegardin, George E.
- Architect: Washburn, George P., Co.
- Architectural style: Classical Revival, Neo-Classical
- MPS: Carnegie Libraries of Kansas TR
- NRHP reference No.: 88001170
- Added to NRHP: August 10, 1988

The Eureka Carnegie Library is a Carnegie library located at 520 N. Main in Eureka, Kansas. The library was built in 1914 through a $9,000 grant from the Carnegie Foundation. The George P. Washburn Co. designed the building in the Classical Revival style. The red brick library has a facade with three bays. The library's main entrance is within a projecting pavilion topped by a keystone and two voussoirs; the doorway once had a transom which has since been covered. A limestone entablature encircles the building, and the windows feature brick lintels with limestone keystones.

The library was added to the National Register of Historic Places on August 10, 1988.
