= Eureka station (Kansas) =

- Eureka Atchison, Topeka and Santa Fe Railroad Depot
- U.S. National Register of Historic Places
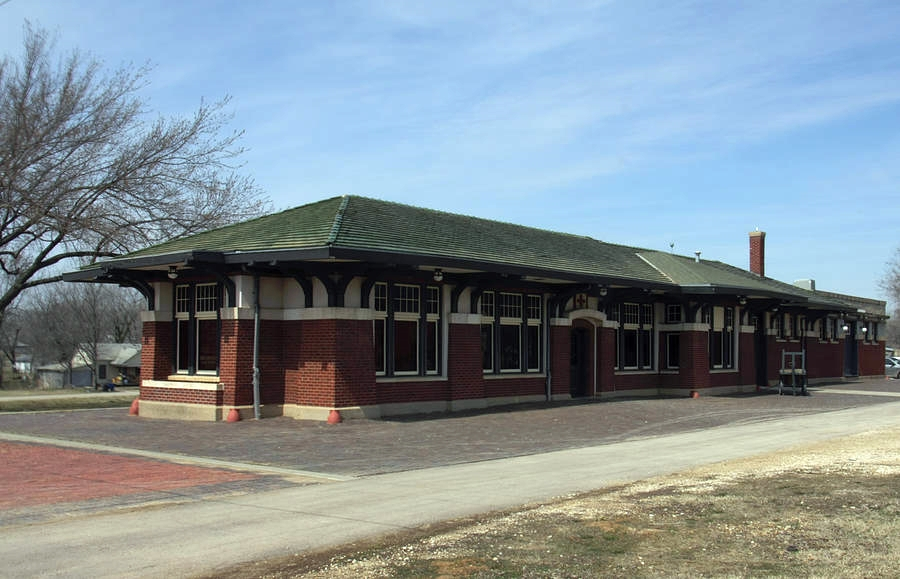

- Location within Kansas Location within the United States
- Location: 416 E. 5th Street; Eureka, Kansas
- Coordinates: 37°49′24.3768″N 96°17′21.159″W
- Built: 1917
- Architect: E. A. Harrison
- Architectural style: Prairie Style
- NRHP reference No.: 12001119
- Added to NRHP: January 2, 2013

Eureka Atchison, Topeka and Santa Fe Railroad Depot is a historic building at 416 E. 5th Street in Eureka, Kansas. The depot is on the Howard Branch of the Atchison, Topeka and Santa Fe Railway. It was built to replace an earlier 1879 depot, located just to the north. Completed in 1917 at a cost of $20,000, the depot was part of a building boom in the area, caused by the discovery of oil in Butler and Greenwood counties.

Passenger service on the Howard Branch ended in the mid-1950s, the depot closed in 1971.

Preceding station	Atchison, Topeka and Santa Fe Railway	Following station
Climax toward Moline	Moline – Emporia	Utopia toward Emporia
