= The Woodlands (race track) =

Former racing venue in Kansas City, Kansas, United States

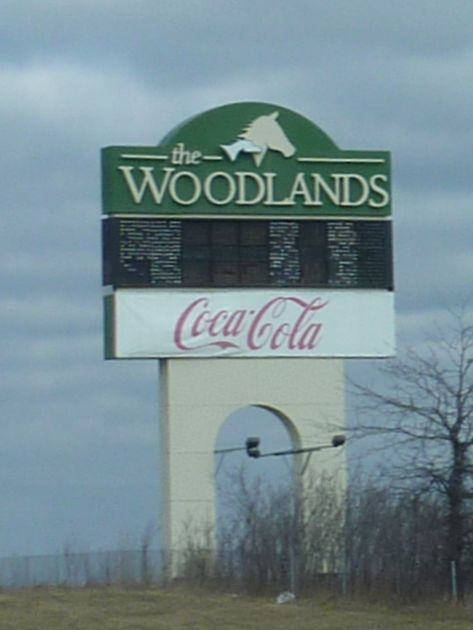
- Sign for the track in 2009
- Location: Kansas City, Kansas
- Coordinates: 39.1485°N 94.7972°W
- Owned by: Phil Ruffin
- Date opened: 1989

The Woodlands was a greyhound racing (and later horse racing) track at 9700 Leavenworth Road, Kansas City, Kansas, from 1989 until 2008.

== History ==
In 1986, Kansas voters approved an amendment to the state constitution that permitted, regulated, and taxed horse and dog racing with parimutuel betting. The following year, the Kansas Legislature passed the Kansas Parimutuel Racing Act, which established the Kansas Racing Commission (later renamed the Kansas Racing and Gaming Commission) to oversee the new industry.

The track officially opened in 1989 with considerable expectations. Kansas claimed it was the home of greyhounds with the National Greyhound Association operating in Abilene, Kansas which is also the location for the National Greyhound Hall of Fame. It was the first legal gambling outlet in the Kansas City metro area since the 1930s. Attendance spiked the second year with 1.7 million in 1990, however it fell to less than 400,000 by 2000 as the track was subject to a series of scandals and competitive pressure.

In 1993, Missouri voters approved riverboat casinos and the boat casinos appeared on the Missouri side, competing for the gambling market.

Furthermore, in 1995, Jorge Anthony Hughes, operator of Hughes Kennels at the track, was charged with selling illegal steroids at the track. Further revelations showed the track was not adequately testing or monitoring for steroid use. In 1996, the track saw more legal issues when charges were filed that employees were accepting illegal out of state bets from Florida.

The track went into bankruptcy in 1996. William M. Grace later brought the track out of bankruptcy in 1998 by holding 85 percent of its mortgage.

However, the problems continued. In 2002, the Kansas Racing and Gaming Commission said that employees had stolen $200,000. Further, Dick Boushka, one of the original owners, was indicted in 2002 that he had falsified documents to get the $19 million in loans from Wichita banks to initially open the track.

The track attempted unsuccessfully to get permission to operate slot machines. Kansas governors Bill Graves and Kathleen Sebelius both endorsed the proposal and the Wyandotte County government attempted to implement it by local law and was passed both times. The track became involved in a dispute over how much money they could keep from the slot machines with the Kansas Lottery. Attempts were made to try to amend the bill which allowed slots at the track but were mainly ignored by leadership in the Kansas legislature.

Grace died in 2005 and his son Howard T. Grace closed the course effective August 24, 2008.

An amendment to a proposed law passed on April 2, 2013, which once again prohibited slot machines at track facilities.

In May 2015, a bill to allow 2,800 slot machines at the track passed the Kansas Senate. Two months later, Phil Ruffin, who also owned two other defunct Kansas tracks, purchased The Woodlands. Ruffin planned to reopen the track for horse racing and to add slot machines. While the county and city governments supported the proposal, the Kansas Legislature ultimately did not amend state gaming laws to permit the plan. An impasse also arose between Ruffin and the Kansas Lottery regarding the amount of revenue The Woodlands could retain from the slot machines.

In June 2020, facing a legislative impasse and a dispute with the Kansas Lottery, Ruffin put the property up for sale and announced tentative talks to sell the property to Scannell Properties. In October 2020, it was announced that the Woodlands Racetracks would be demolished, and that the property would be converted to an Amazon fulfillment center. Demolition occurred in March 2021.
