= Madison station (Kansas) =

- Madison Atchison, Topeka and Santa Fe Railroad Depot
- U.S. National Register of Historic Places
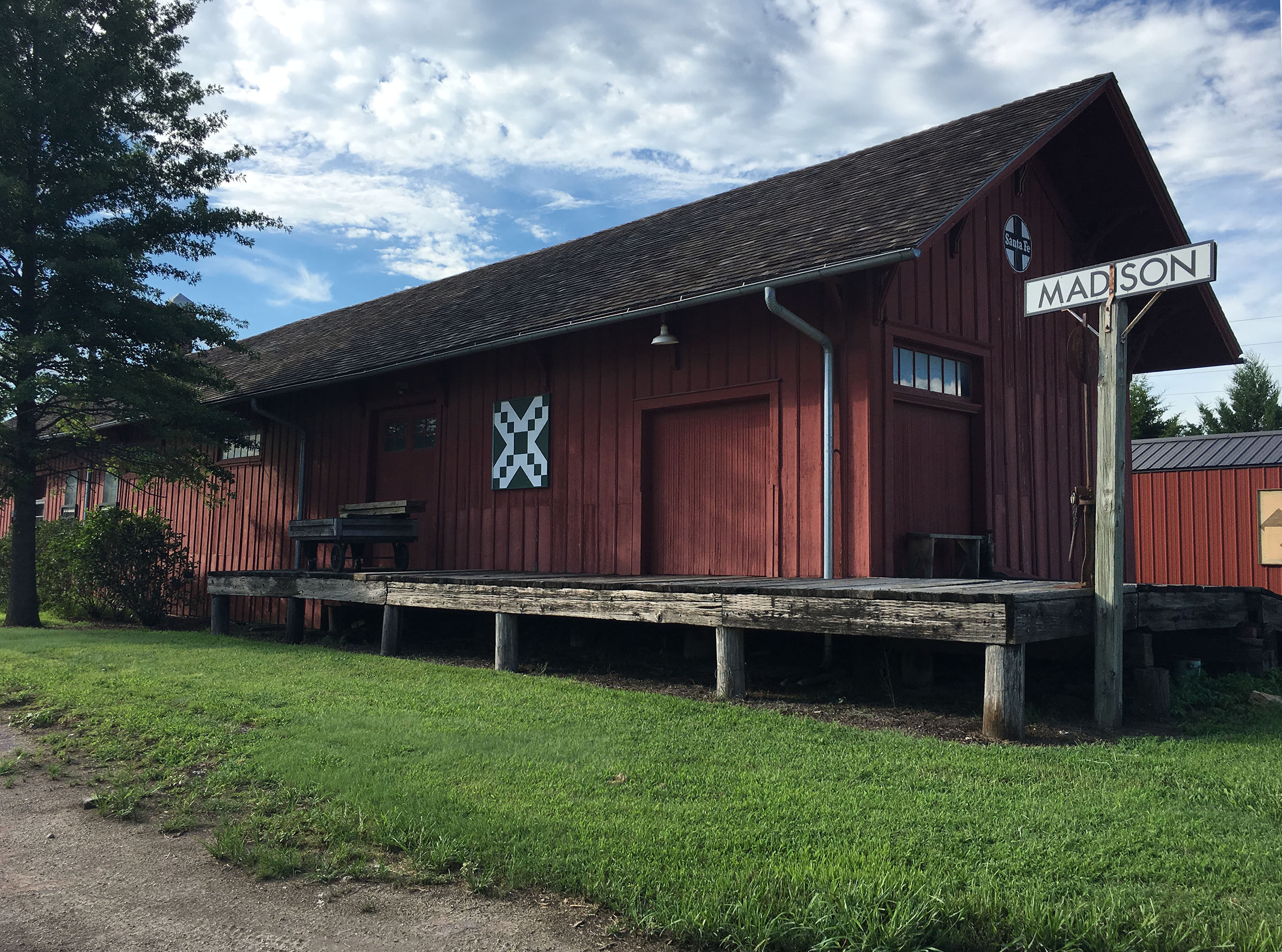

- Location within Kansas Location within the United States
- Location: 3rd & Boone Streets; Madison, Kansas
- Coordinates: 38°08′22″N 96°08′09″W
- Built: circa 1879
- NRHP reference No.: 91001774
- Added to NRHP: December 6, 1991

The Madison station, nominated as the Madison Atchison, Topeka and Santa Fe Railroad Depot, is a historic railroad depot building at 3rd and Boone streets in Madison, Kansas. The depot was on the Emporia to Moline line of the Atchison, Topeka and Santa Fe Railway. The railway reached Madison in May 1879, when the Kansas City, Emporia and Southern Railroad Company, a subsidiary of the Atchison, Topeka and Santa Fe Railway, built south from Emporia. The original line was built as narrow gauge, but was converted to standard gauge a year later. The depot was finished prior to the railroad reaching town, and additions were added to the passenger waiting room around 1915 and the freight room around 1920.

Passenger service to the depot ended in the mid-1940s, with freight service ending in 1975. The station was added to the National Register of Historic Places on December 6, 1991.

Preceding station	Atchison, Topeka and Santa Fe Railway	Following station
Bisbee toward Moline	Moline – Emporia	Olpe toward Emporia
