= A&P Superintendent's House =

Historic house in New Mexico, United States

- Superintendent's House, Atlantic and Pacific Railroad
- U.S. National Register of Historic Places
- NM State Register of Cultural Properties
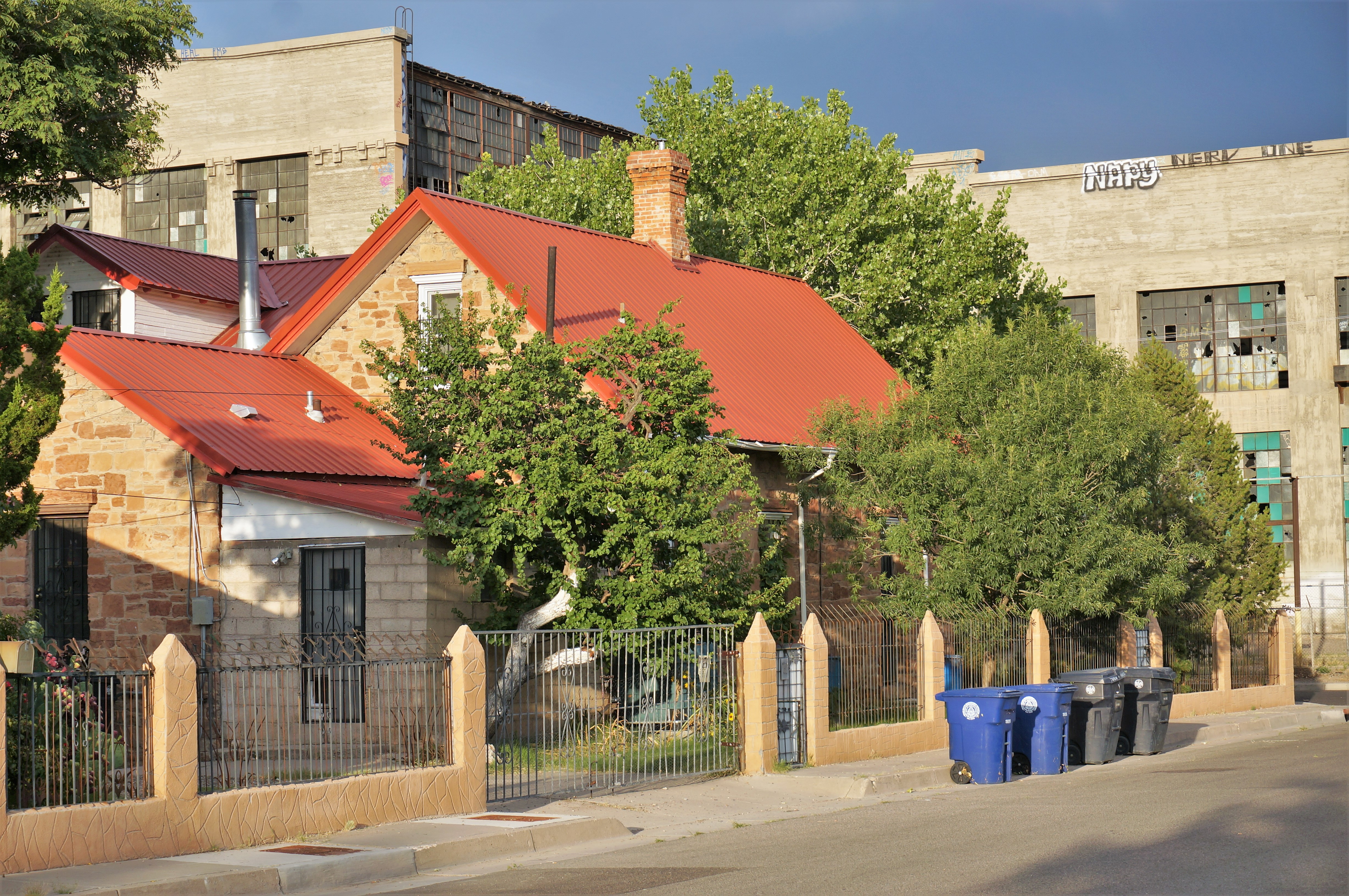
- The house in 2017

- Location within New Mexico Location within the United States
- Location: 1023 2nd St. SW, Albuquerque, New Mexico
- Coordinates: 35°4′29″N 106°39′03″W
- Built: 1881
- NRHP reference No.: 78001808
- NMSRCP No.: 398

Significant dates
- Added to NRHP: January 20, 1978
- Designated NMSRCP: July 25, 1975

The A&P Superintendent's House is a historic house in the Barelas neighborhood of Albuquerque, New Mexico. It was built in 1881 for Frank W. Smith, who used it as his base of operations while supervising construction of the Atlantic and Pacific Railroad from Albuquerque to Needles, California. It is built from red sandstone, believed to have been quarried near Laguna Pueblo, which was the same material used to build the A&P's maintenance facilities on the opposite side of Second Street. Those buildings were replaced by the Santa Fe Railway Shops beginning in 1912, leaving the Superintendent's House as the city's only surviving building associated with the A&P. The house was listed on the New Mexico State Register of Cultural Properties in 1975 and the National Register of Historic Places in 1978.

The Superintendent's House is a one-and-a-half-story building with an intersecting gable roof and an open porch which wraps around the north and east sides. The walls are 18 inches (46 cm) thick and are constructed from sandstone blocks set in broken courses. The windows and door openings have stone lintels and sills with wood trim, and the porch features finely carved wooden pillars, cornices, and corbels ornamented with stars and arabesques. The north section of the house is side-gabled, with two dormers, and contains the living and dining rooms. The front-gabled south section contains two bedrooms, a bathroom, and a kitchen wing at the rear. The upper floor was originally constructed as servants' quarters but was later converted to a separate apartment.
