= Barelas =

- Neighborhood
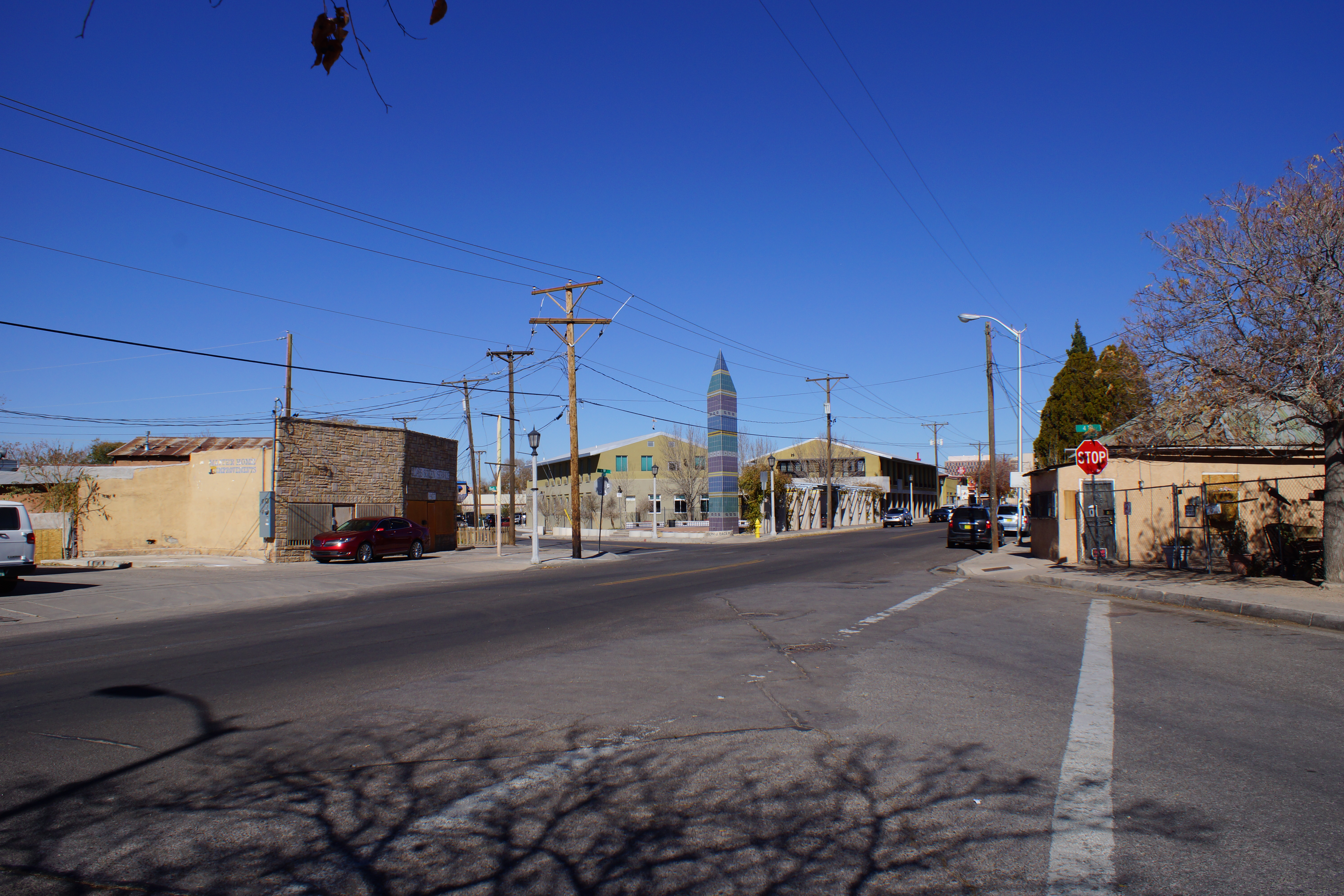
- 4th St. in Barelas

- Location within New Mexico Location within the United States
- Coordinates: 35°4′40″N 106°39′20″W
- Country: United States
- State: New Mexico
- City: Albuquerque

Government
  - City Council: Isaac Benton
  - State House: Miguel Garcia (D); Javier Martinez (D)
  - State Senate: Jerry Ortiz y Pino (D)
  - U.S. House: Melanie Stansbury (D)

Area
  - Total: 0.94 sq mi (2.4 km^{2})
- Elevation: 4,947 ft (1,508 m)

Population (2010)
  - Total: 3,382
  - Density: 3,598/sq mi (1,389/km^{2})
- Time zone: UTC-7 (Mountain Time Zone)
  - Summer (DST): UTC-6 (Mountain Daylight Time)
- ZIP Code: 87102, 87104
- Area code: 505
- GNIS feature ID: 898630

Barelas is an inner-city neighborhood of Albuquerque, New Mexico, located immediately south of Downtown. It consists of the triangular area bounded by Coal Avenue, the BNSF railroad tracks, and the Rio Grande. Originally a separate village, it was absorbed into Albuquerque during the railroad-fueled growth of the 1880s but still retains a distinct identity. The settlement was formally established in 1662, predating even Old Town as the oldest neighborhood in the city. Although it was long one of Albuquerque's most economically distressed areas, Barelas has seen significant development since the opening of the National Hispanic Cultural Center in 2000 and may be starting to experience gentrification.

The neighborhood's main commercial area is listed on the National Register of Historic Places as the Barelas-South Fourth Street Historic District.

== Geography ==
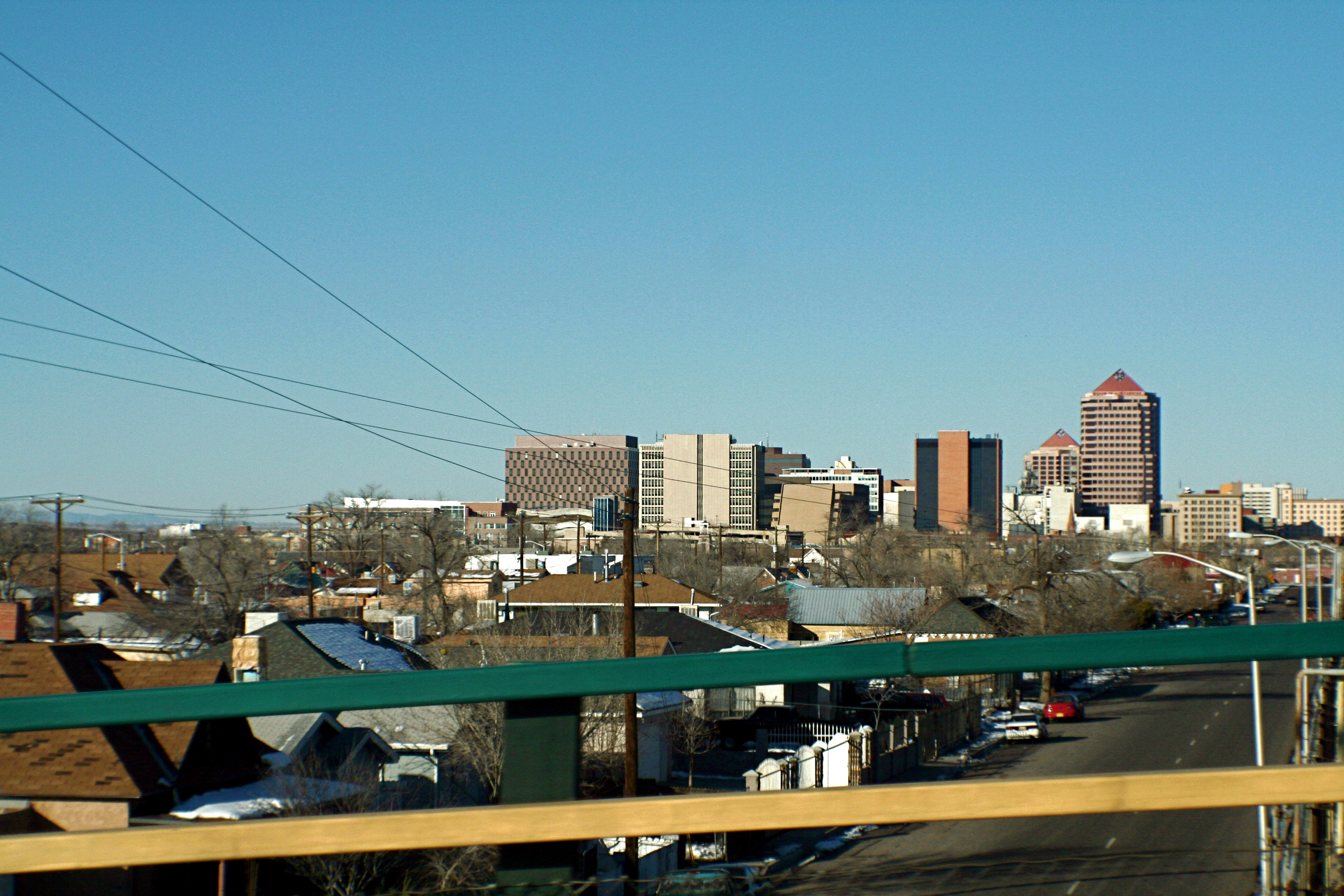
Barelas, with downtown Albuquerque in the background

The neighborhood occupies a roughly triangular region between the Rio Grande and the BNSF railroad tracks south of Coal Avenue, which forms the boundary with Downtown. The area claimed by the Barelas Neighborhood Association extends all the way south to Woodward Road, though south of Bridge Boulevard the neighborhood becomes primarily industrial rather than residential. Geographically speaking Barelas is somewhat isolated, with the railyard and river separating it from adjacent areas to the east and west.

== Demographics ==
Barelas has around 3,700 inhabitants, roughly two thirds of whom are Hispanic. It has historically been one of the poorest neighborhoods in Albuquerque. In 2000, per capita income was $5,871, with 46.4% of the population below the poverty line and 20.5% of households receiving public assistance. The unemployment rate was 21.9%.

== History ==
=== Early history ===
The area now known as Barelas was originally the site of an important river crossing on El Camino Real de Tierra Adentro, the main Spanish trade route through New Mexico. The crossing was described by Zebulon Pike in 1807 as being "400 yards wide, but not more than three feet deep and excellent fording". A settlement was formally established there (on paper at least) by colonial governor Diego de Peñalosa in 1662, though it remained largely unpopulated until the 19th century. The name Barelas is thought to come from a local landowner named Pedro Varela (or Barela), who had a ranch in the area.

Barelas in the late 1800s was a quiet agricultural community, with 309 residents listed in the 1870 Census and 350 in 1880. The village did see minor action during the American Civil War, most notably during the Battle of Albuquerque in April 1862. On that occasion, Union troops in Barelas exchanged long-range artillery fire with a Confederate position east of Albuquerque for several hours, with no casualties.

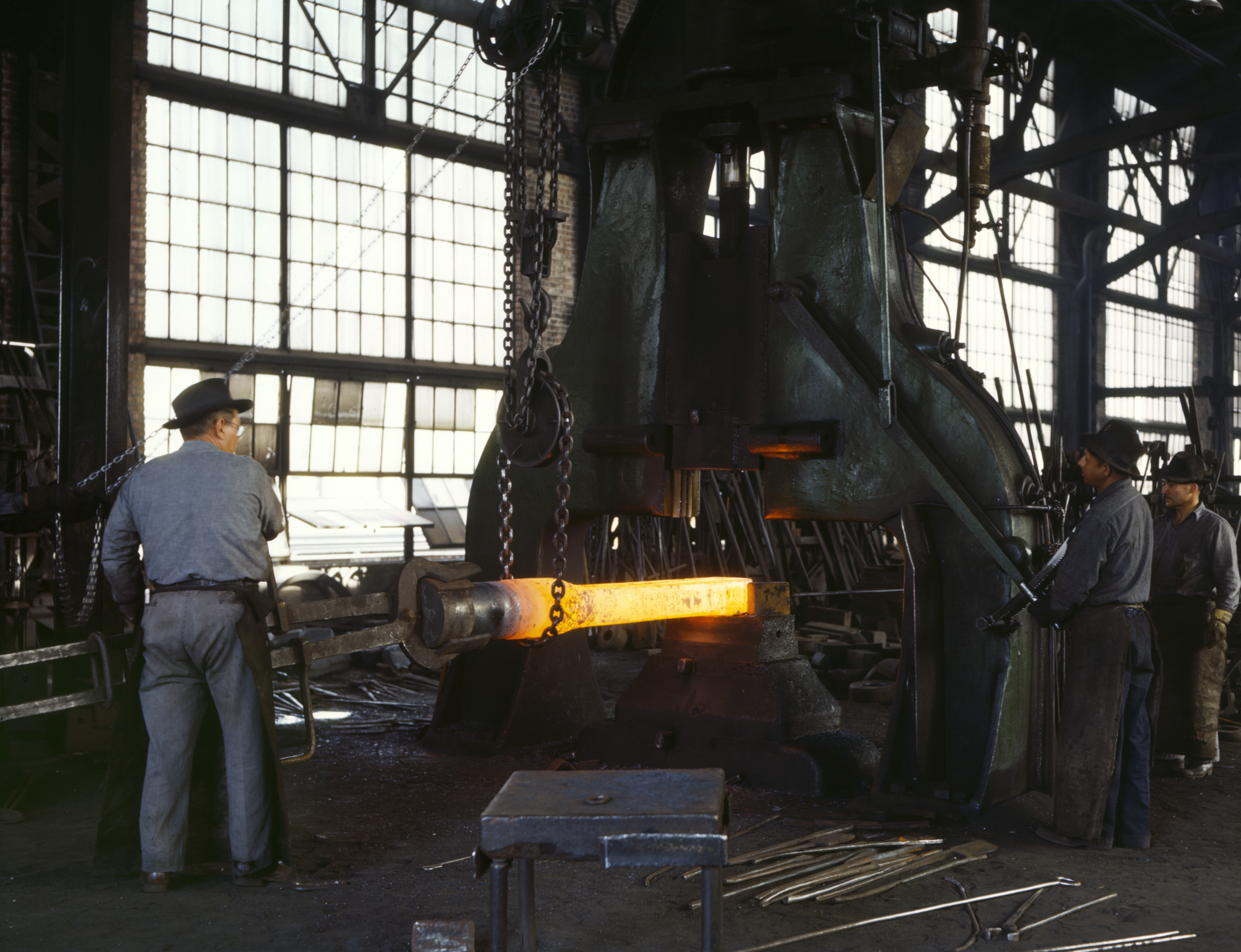
Workers at the railroad shops in 1943

=== Boom years ===
The Atchison, Topeka and Santa Fe Railway reached Albuquerque in 1880. In order to keep the route as straight as possible, however, the railroad planners chose to build the Albuquerque depot and some 1.5 miles (2.4 km) east of the actual town. This led to the immediate creation of a separate "New Town" adjacent to the depot and directly north of Barelas. Fueled by the presence of the massive Santa Fe Railway Shops, Albuquerque's largest employer at the time, Barelas underwent a rapid transformation from quiet farming village to busy blue-collar neighborhood. By 1900 there were over 1,200 residents, many of whom worked for the railroad. Most of Barelas was incorporated into the City of Albuquerque in 1891, marking its end as a separate community.

Barelas saw increased prosperity after 4th Street, one of the main arteries through the neighborhood, was designated as part of U.S. Route 66 in 1926. The road was soon lined with filling stations, garages, and cafes catering to the steady stream of travelers passing through Barelas.

=== Decline ===
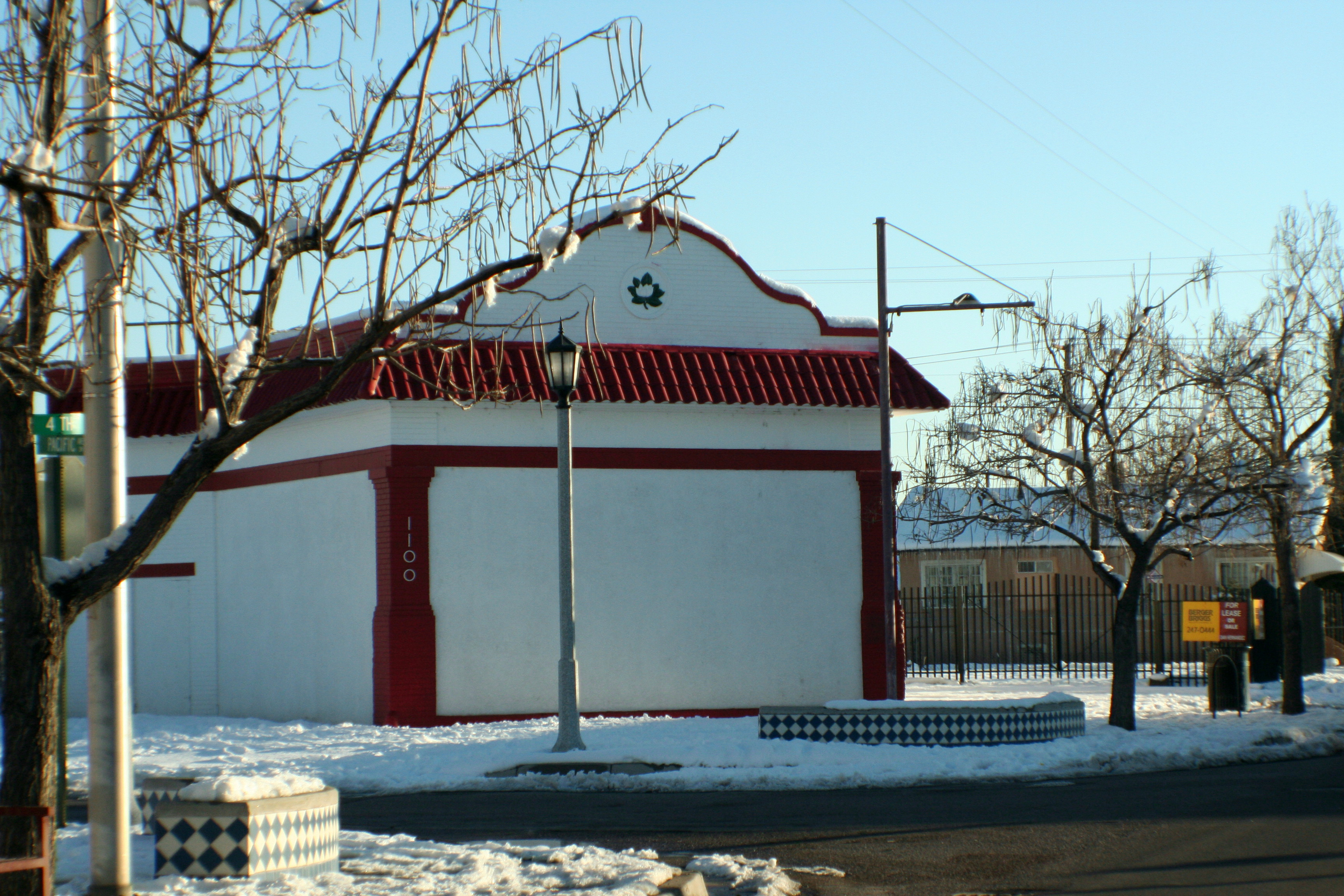
Former filling station in Barelas

Barelas suffered a series of economic setbacks in the mid-20th century, the first of which was the realignment of Route 66 in 1937. The new east-west route was 90 miles (140 km) shorter, but the rerouting of the highway from 4th Street to Central Avenue bypassed Barelas entirely. Traffic on 4th eroded further still when Interstate 25 supplanted U.S. 85 as Albuquerque's main north-south highway.

To make matters worse, the railroad shops closed in 1970, eliminating 1,500 jobs from Barelas. Then in 1974 a downtown section of 4th Street was closed to build Civic Plaza, cutting off the neighborhood's main artery. Isolated from the rest of the city and with its economic base in ruins, Barelas descended into poverty and crime.

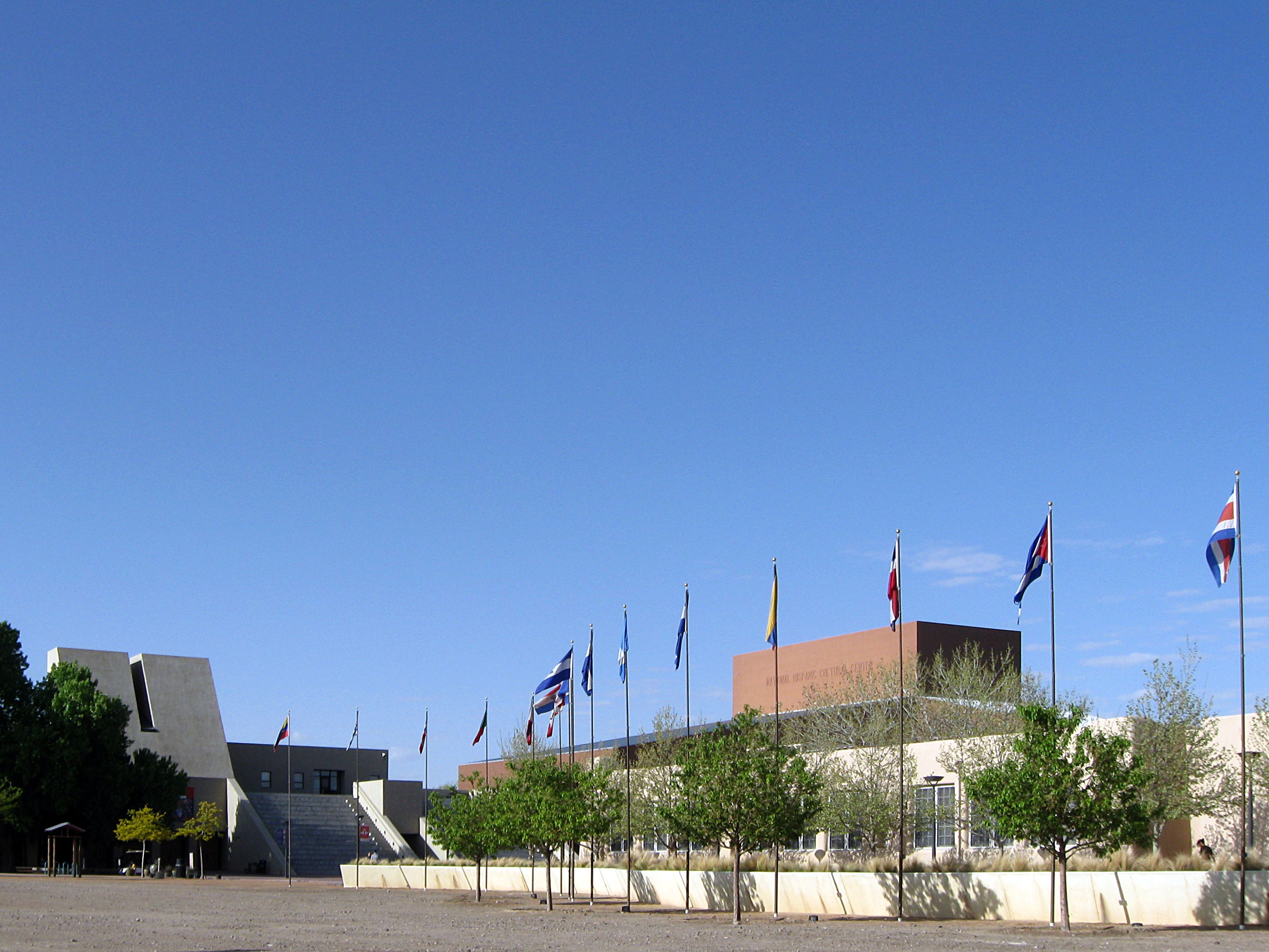
National Hispanic Cultural Center

=== Renewal ===
Barelas has experienced a gradual resurgence since the late 1980s as demand for housing near Downtown has increased. A major turning point came in 2000 with the opening of the National Hispanic Cultural Center, a $50 million project that brought visitors and capital back into the neighborhood. The opening of the Albuquerque Hispano Chamber of Commerce and Barelas Job Opportunity Center in 2001 has also furthered economic development in Barelas. Another potentially significant project for the neighborhood is the pending redevelopment of the former railyard complex, which has been vacant since the 1970s. As of 2011 this project is still in the planning stage but has already fueled land speculation in Barelas, raising the possibility of gentrification.

In 1997, the commercial area along 4th Street was listed on the National Register of Historic Places as the Barelas-South Fourth Street Historic District.

== Education ==
Albuquerque Public Schools operates two public elementary schools in Barelas. Dolores Gonzales Elementary is the main school serving the neighborhood, while Coronado Elementary offers a specialized dual-language program. Older students in Barelas are assigned to Washington Middle School and Albuquerque High School, which are outside the neighborhood.

== Transportation ==
Barelas was formerly served by two major highways, U.S. Route 85 and U.S. Route 66. Both took the same route through the neighborhood, following 4th Street south before turning west across the Barelas Bridge. Although both highways were later rerouted, 4th Street and Bridge Boulevard are still the primary thoroughfares in Barelas and the bridge remains an important link for local traffic.

Public transit in Barelas is provided by ABQ RIDE's 53 Isleta and 54 Bridge/Westgate city bus routes, which follow 8th Street and 4th Street respectively. Additional rail and bus connections are available a few blocks north of Barelas at the Alvarado Transportation Center.

== Notable residents ==
- Rudolfo Anaya, author
- Dennis Chavez, U.S. senator
- Alphonse Gallegos, Auxiliary Bishop of Sacramento

== Places of interest ==
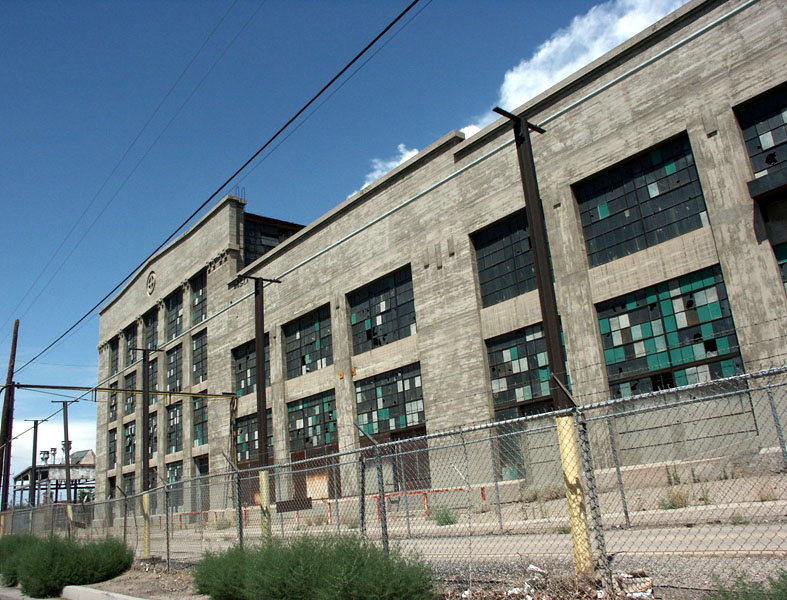
The AT&SF shops in 2004

- National Hispanic Cultural Center
- Rio Grande Zoo
- Barelas Coffee House
- Tingley Field (demolished)

=== National Register of Historic Places ===
In addition to the Barelas-South Fourth Street Historic District, there are a number of individual NRHP properties in Barelas:

- A&P Superintendent's House
- AT&SF Railway Locomotive Shops
- Barelas Community Center
- Coronado School
- Charles W. Lewis Building
- Newlander Apartments
- Shoup Boardinghouse (demolished)
- West San Jose School

== In popular culture ==
Barelas was the setting for Time and Again Barelas, a three-act opera by Miguel del Aguila. Commissioned for Albuquerque's Tricentennial celebration, the opera premiered on April 20, 2006 at the National Hispanic Cultural Center.

The vacant railyard complex in Barelas has become a frequently used filming location. Movies filmed there include Beerfest (2006), The Spirit (2008), Gamer (2009), Terminator Salvation (2009), and The Avengers (2012). The pilot episode of Terminator: The Sarah Connor Chronicles also used the railyard as a location. Many scenes from Breaking Bad were filmed at the railyard.
