= Washington Apartments =

- U.S. National Register of Historic Places
- NM State Register of Cultural Properties
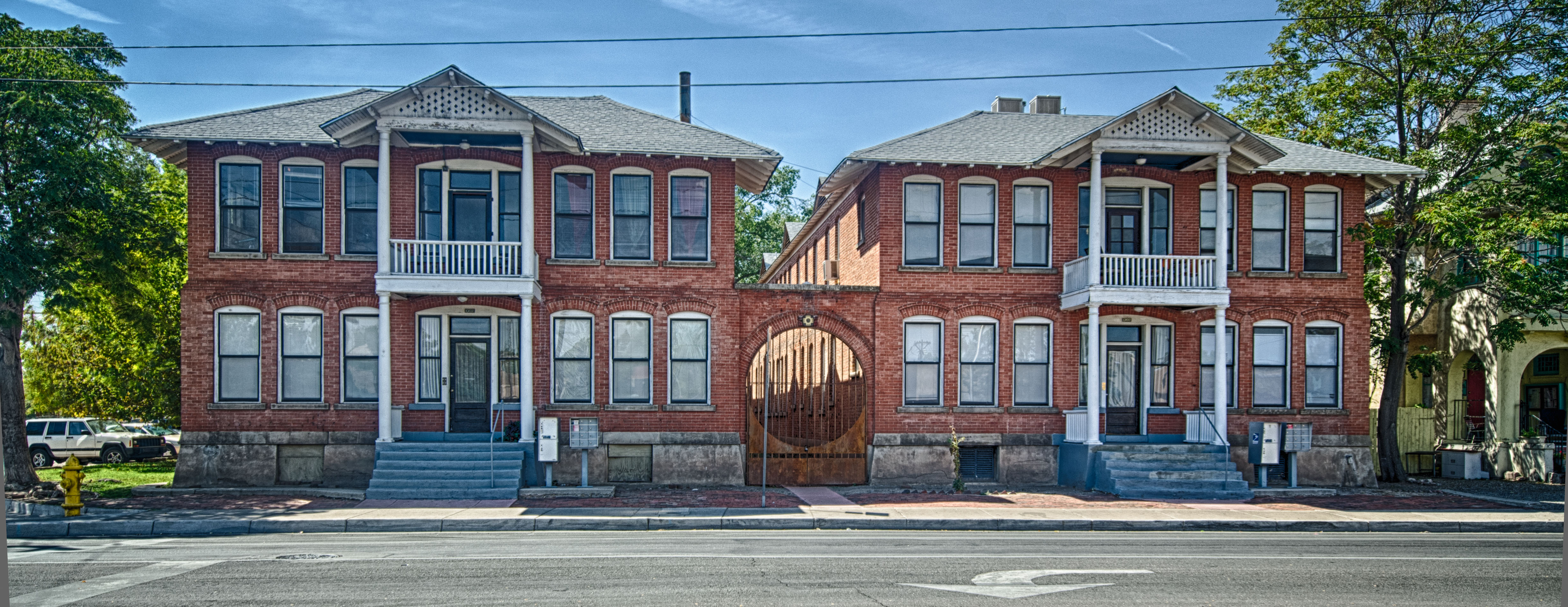
- Washington Apartments, September 2012

- Location within New Mexico Location within the United States
- Location: 1002–1008 Central Ave. SW., Albuquerque, New Mexico
- Coordinates: 35°05′11″N 106°39′31″W
- Built: 1916
- Architect: J.L. LaDriere
- NRHP reference No.: 82003319
- NMSRCP No.: 589

Significant dates
- Added to NRHP: February 19, 1982
- Designated NMSRCP: January 20, 1978

The Washington Apartments are a historic apartment complex in Albuquerque, New Mexico. The property is notable as a well-preserved example of early 20th-century apartment construction in the city, along with the Eller Apartments and Newlander Apartments. The apartments were built in 1916 by local businessman James D. Eakin and, as of 1981, had remained relatively unaltered. The complex is listed in the New Mexico State Register of Cultural Properties and the National Register of Historic Places.

== History ==
The Washington Apartments were built in 1916 by local businessman James D. Eakin, already a successful liquor wholesaler. The complex was designed by J.L. LaDriere and cost $21,000. The apartments opened in September of that year to fanfare from the Albuquerque Journal, which reported "Everything that modern craft can devise has been utilized to make them strictly up-to-date and they are not only a credit to the designer and builder but to the city of Albuquerque." Some of the innovative features included refrigerators, electric stoves, and Murphy beds. Eakin maintained his own residence there and managed the apartments until his death in 1931. His family continued to own the property into the 1970s. In the early years, the complex also included Victorian-style Turkish baths in the basement as well as garage facilities and a tennis court.

The apartments were added to the New Mexico State Register of Cultural Properties in 1978 and the National Register of Historic Places in 1982.

== Architecture ==
The apartments consist of two identical red brick buildings separated by a narrow courtyard to allow light into the interior apartments. The twin blocks are rectangular in plan with two above-ground floors and a basement, and overhanging hipped roofs. The facade of each building is symmetrical with three bays on either side of a projecting two-story porch with a gable roof and classically detailed columns and balustrades. Inside, the buildings are organized around a double-loaded central hallway with an oak staircase at either end. The apartments originally consisted of one-bedroom and efficiency units and were reported to have many original interior details intact as of 1981.
