= Eller Apartments =

- U.S. National Register of Historic Places
- NM State Register of Cultural Properties
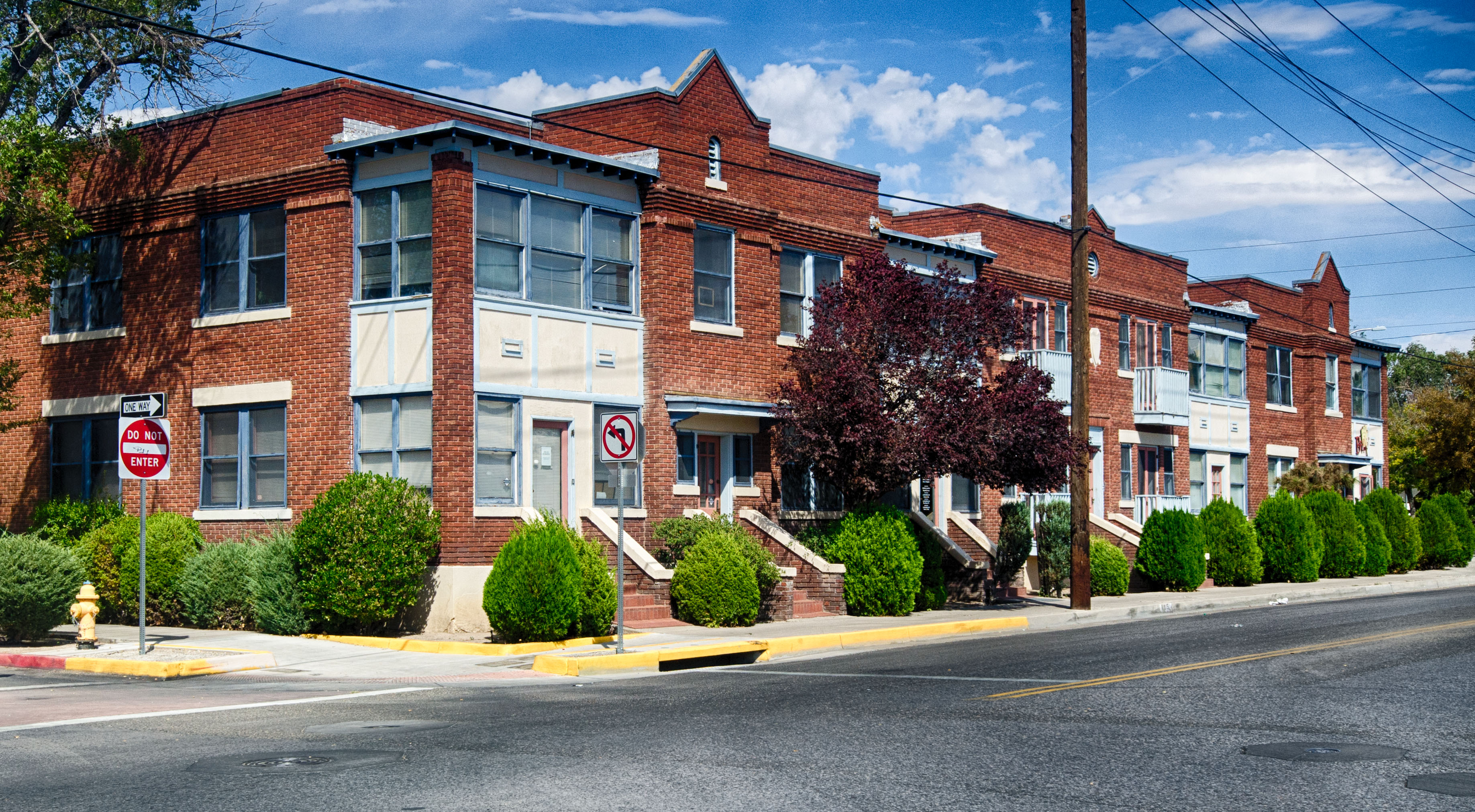
- The apartments in 2012

- Location within New Mexico Location within the United States
- Location: 113-127 8th St. SW, Albuquerque, New Mexico
- Coordinates: 35°5′4″N 106°39′24″W
- Built: 1922
- Architect: Trost & Trost
- NRHP reference No.: 84002855
- NMSRCP No.: 951

Significant dates
- Added to NRHP: January 12, 1984
- Designated NMSRCP: October 25, 1983

The Eller Apartments are a historic apartment building in Albuquerque, New Mexico. The apartments were built in 1922 by Dr. Charles A. Eller (1879–1967), a prominent local dentist, and are believed to be the city's second oldest apartments after the Washington Apartments. The building was designed by Trost & Trost of El Paso and built by E. J. Marchant, the same team who completed the no longer extant Castle Apartments the same year. The apartments were positioned at the luxury end of the market and were home to well-known residents including former Governor Merritt C. Mechem. The building was added to the New Mexico State Register of Cultural Properties in 1983 and the National Register of Historic Places in 1984.

The apartment block is a two-story brick building containing 12 apartments. The front elevation is divided into three pedimented brick sections separated by enclosed sun porches. The center section has two small balconies on each floor and is decorated with a small medallion with the name "Eller". The property was renovated in 1984, converting the downstairs apartments into law offices and small retail spaces.
