= National Hispanic Cultural Center =

Art museum and cultural center in Albuquerque, New Mexico

Coordinates: 35°04′05″N 106°39′19″W

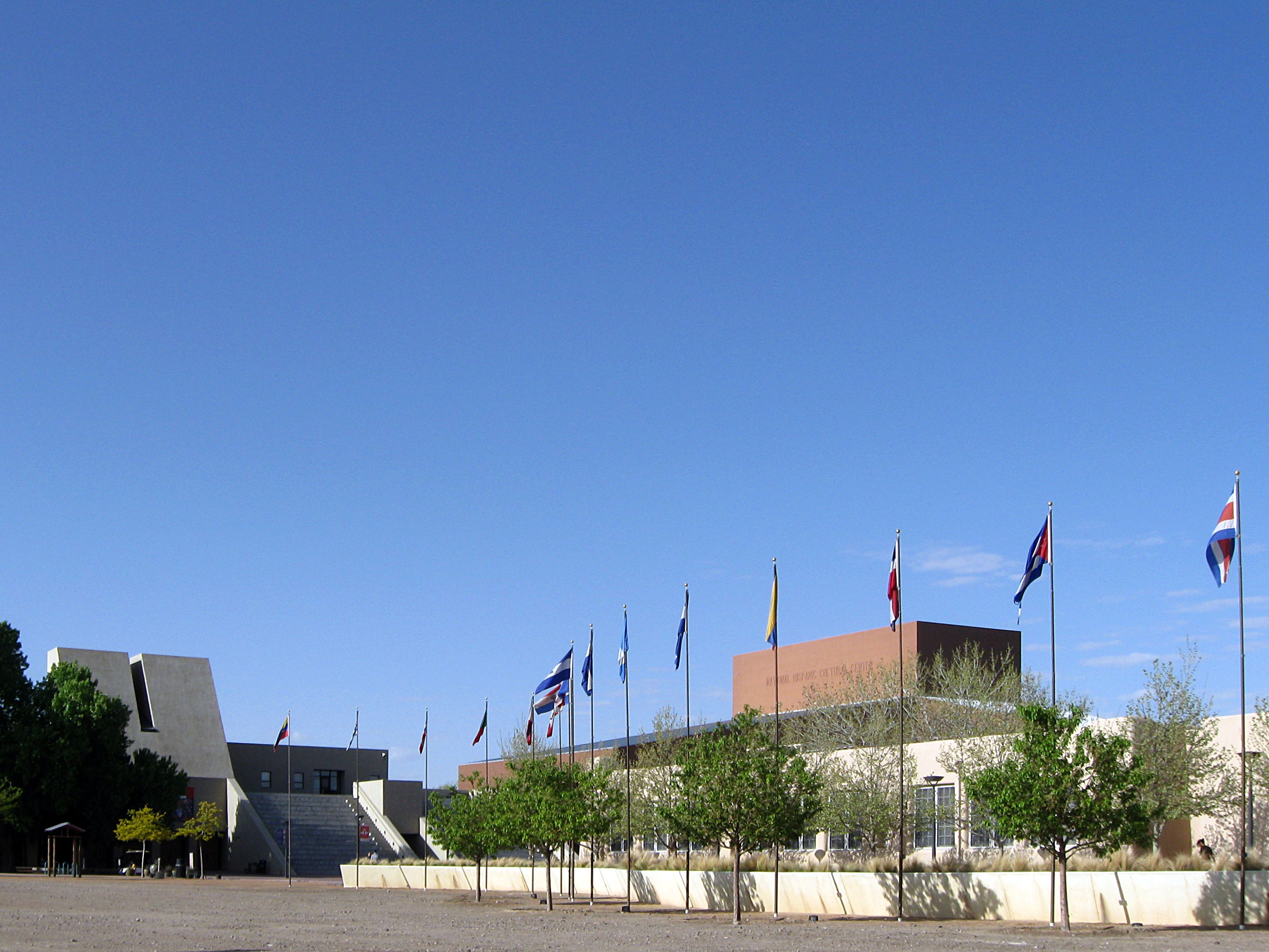
National Hispanic Cultural Center

The National Hispanic Cultural Center is an institution in Albuquerque, New Mexico dedicated to Hispanic culture, arts and humanities. The campus spans 20 acres and is located along the Rio Grande in Albuquerque, New Mexico, on Avenida César Chávez and 4th St. Now presenting 700 events a year, the NHCC is home to three theatres, an art museum, library, genealogy center, Spanish-language resource center, two restaurants (Pop Fizz Paleteria and La Fonda del Bosque) and the largest concave fresco in North America.

The NHCC opened in 2000 and is one of several institutions governed by the State of New Mexico's Department of Cultural Affairs. Events, exhibitions and programs are presented in the areas of music, theatre, dance, visual arts, culinary arts, film, history, literary arts and culturally-significant customs, featuring local, national and international artists, scholars and entertainers. In addition to its own events, the NHCC also hosts hundreds of rental events each year, including film screenings, weddings, memorial services, graduation parties and quinceañeras - in its theatres, ballrooms and outside plaza.

The NHCC sits within the Barelas neighborhood, a traditionally Hispanic neighborhood that has historically been a crossroads for New Mexico's people. The community was settled for its proximity to a natural ford in the Rio Grande and to the Camino Real, the Spanish colonial-era Royal Road used primarily for trade between Mexico and northern New Mexico, and later grew dramatically due to its proximity to the railroad.
