= Charles W. Lewis Building =

- U.S. National Register of Historic Places
- NM State Register of Cultural Properties
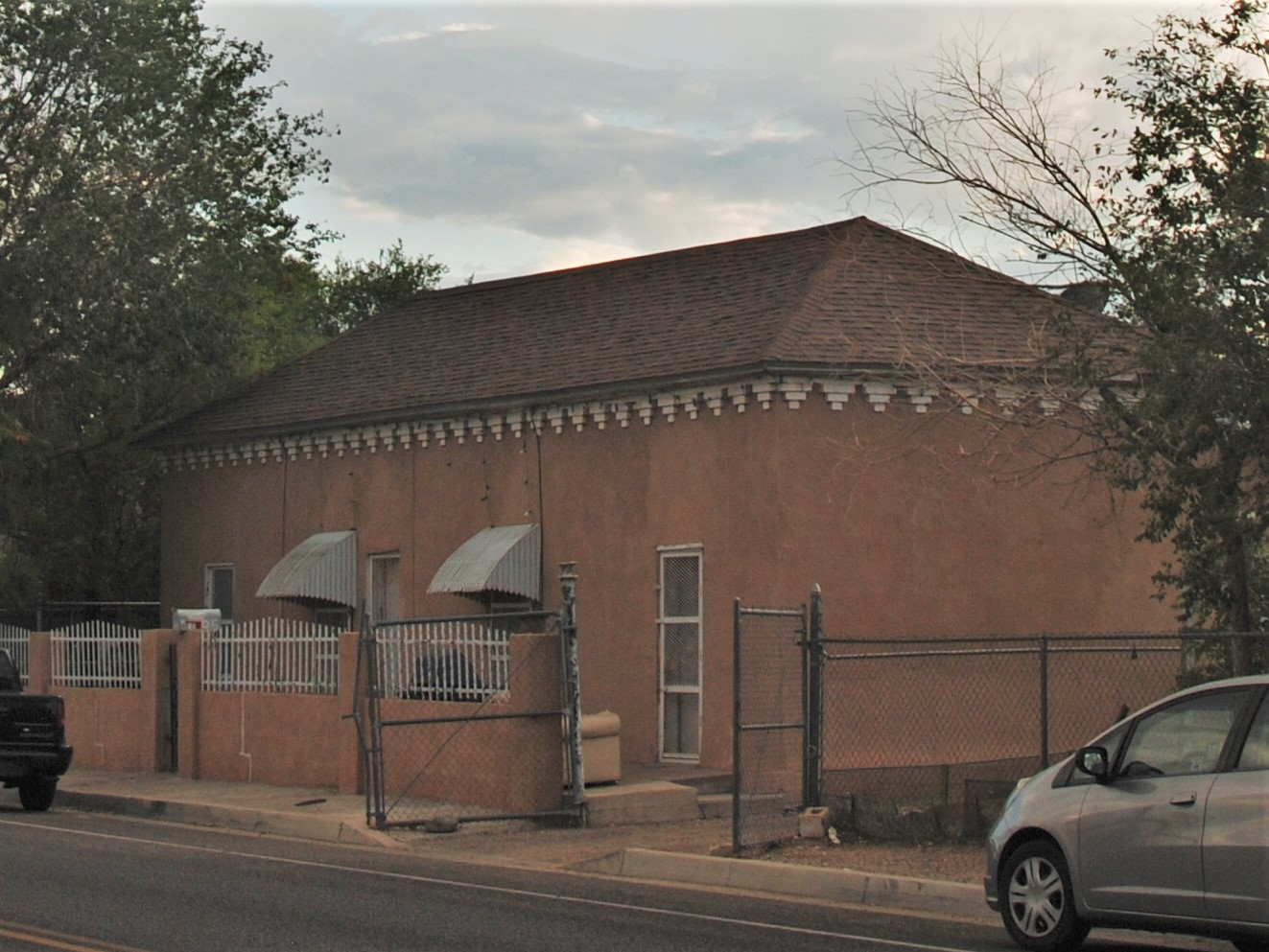
- Charles W. Lewis Building, September 2017

- Location within New Mexico Location within the United States
- Location: 1405–1407 2nd St. SW, Albuquerque, New Mexico
- Coordinates: 35°4′18″N 106°39′5″W
- Area: 0.2 acres (0.081 ha)
- NRHP reference No.: 79001533
- NMSRCP No.: 711

Significant dates
- Added to NRHP: July 3, 1979
- Designated NMSRCP: February 9, 1979

The Charles W. Lewis Building is a historic building in the Barelas neighborhood of Albuquerque, New Mexico. It is listed on the New Mexico State Register of Cultural Properties and the National Register of Historic Places. It was built around 1882 by Charles W. Lewis (1844–1901), a native of Peralta, New Mexico who came to Albuquerque in 1873. Lewis was one of many Albuquerque residents to get involved in land speculation as the Atchison, Topeka and Santa Fe Railway approached the town in the late 1870s. Once the railroad arrived, Lewis was able to subdivide a valuable piece of land near the tracks and used one of the lots for the building described here, which was probably built as rental housing. In 1915 it was reportedly being operated as a saloon.

The building is a one-story, rectangular brick structure with a hipped roof supported by distinctive triangular brick corbels that wrap around all four sides. Originally front of the building had two doors and two sash windows; a third door was added later and the original transoms and window arches have been stuccoed over. The interior of the building has four rooms arranged in a linear plan, with a later addition at the rear.
