= Edward Alfred Harrison =

Canadian-born American architect

Edward Alfred Harrison (born 1869), known as E. A. Harrison, was an American architect who worked as a staff architect for the Atchison, Topeka & Santa Fe Railway, with offices in Topeka, Kansas, and later in Chicago, Illinois.

Born in Hamilton, Ontario, Harrison studied under Canadian architect James Balfour from 1887 to 1892. He became an architectural draftsman for the San Francisco & San Joaquin Valley Railway, a Santa Fe subsidiary, in 1887. He began architectural work for the Santa Fe at Topeka, Kansas. Prior to 1901 he was a member of the United States Navy's Guam Survey Board. He became a member of the American Railway Engineering Association in 1914, and was a member of the Association's Committee VI - Buildings from 1915 to 1919, and its Committee XXIII - Shops and Locomotive Terminals in 1921.

As the System Architect for the Santa Fe, Harrison often was the approving official for work done by railroad staff members or by others working for the railroad. The railroad prepared plans for the El Navajo Hotel in Gallup, New Mexico, based on architect Mary Colter's design, but it is Harrison's signature which appears on the drawings as the approving railroad official.

Harrison retired from the Santa Fe January 1, 1940, and in 1948 was living in Dallas, Texas.

== Works ==
- Depot, 307 South Grant, Amarillo, Texas, 1910, Spanish Mission Revival style
- Station, Lexington Junction, Missouri, 1912
- Station, Fowler, Kansas, 1912
- Freight Depot and Office Building, Topeka, Kansas, 1913
- Passenger Station and Office Building, Galveston, Texas, 1913
- Remodeling and additions to Eating Houses at Dodge City, Kansas, and Fort Worth, Texas, 1913
- Telegraph stations at Las Vegas, New Mexico, and Trinidad, Colorado, 1913
- Freight Depot and Office Building, Dodge City, Kansas, 1913
- Dormitory, Bright Angel Camp, Grand Canyon, Arizona, 1914
- Fireproof Records Building, Topeka, Kansas, 1915
- Combination Depot, Shattuck, Oklahoma, 1917
- Depot, 416 E 5th Street, Eureka, Kansas, 1917, Prairie style, NRHP 12001119
- Depot, 555 East Pikes Peak Avenue, Colorado Springs, Colorado, 1917, Jacobethan style, NRHP 79000597
- Powerhouse, Shopton, Iowa, 1918
- Sheet Metal House, Albuquerque, New Mexico, 1918
- AT&SF Fire Station, First/Second SW, Albuquerque, New Mexico, 1920, Rustic Southwest style
- Machine Shop, Albuquerque, New Mexico, 1921
- Water Treatment Plant, La Junta, Colorado, 1922
- Boiler Shop, Albuquerque, New Mexico, 1923
- El Navajo Hotel, Gallup, New Mexico, 1923, Pueblo Revival style, Mary Colter design, demolished 1957
- Tender Repair Shop (tank shop), Albuquerque, New Mexico, 1925
- Depot, Panhandle, Texas, 1927
- Lavatory and Ice Storage Building, La Junta, Colorado, 1929
- Santa Fe Building, 900 South Polk Street, Amarillo, Texas, 1930, Late Gothic Revival style, NRHP 96000939
- Santa Fe Building, Galveston, Texas, 1932, Art Deco style
- Depot, Oklahoma City, Oklahoma, 1934, NRHP

== Gallery ==
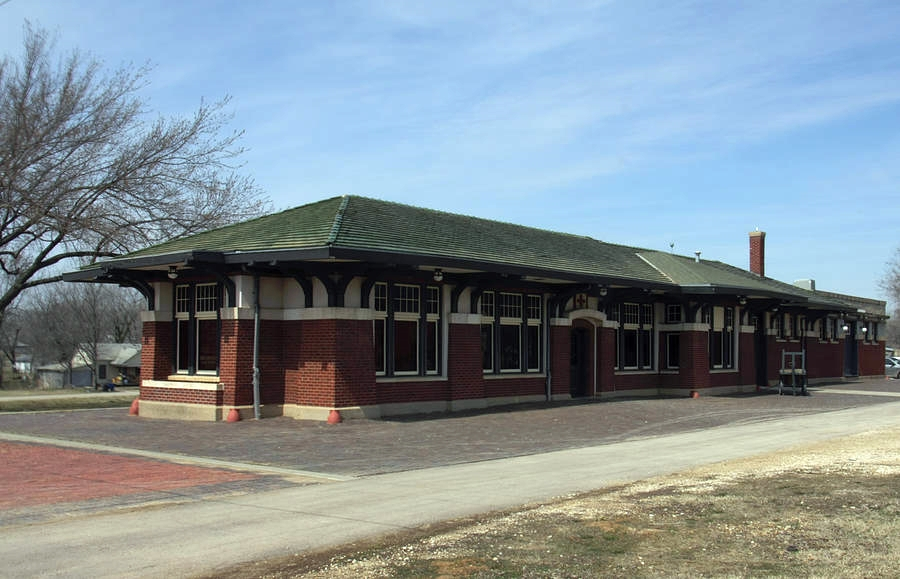
Eureka Depot

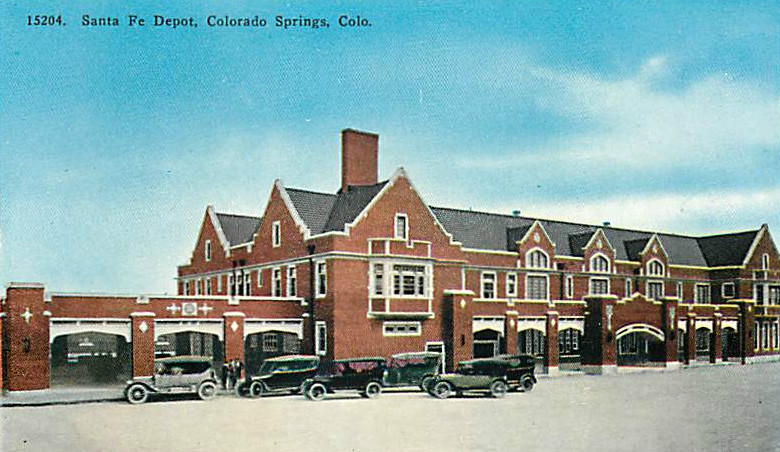
Colorado Springs Depot

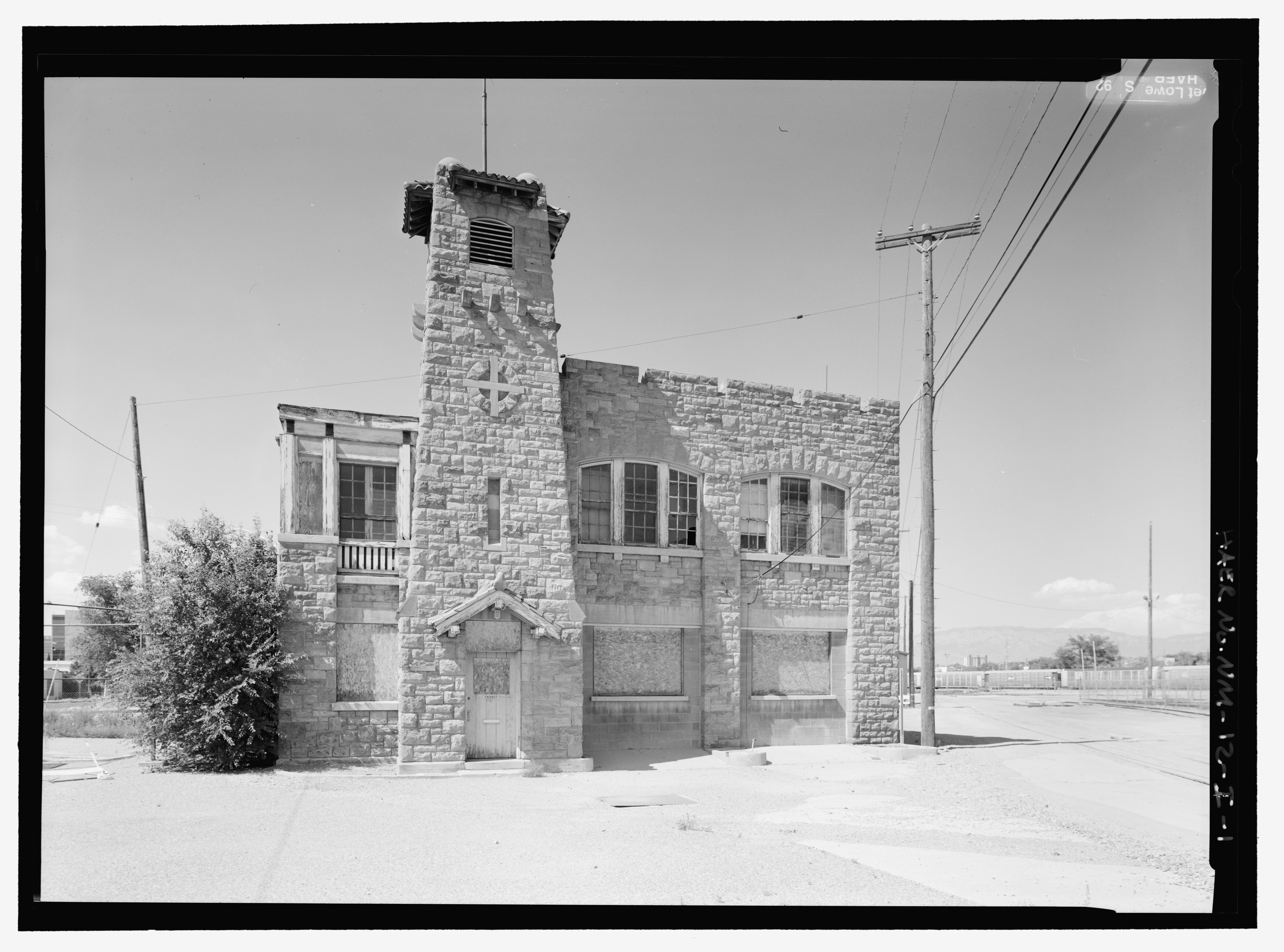
Albuquerque Fire House

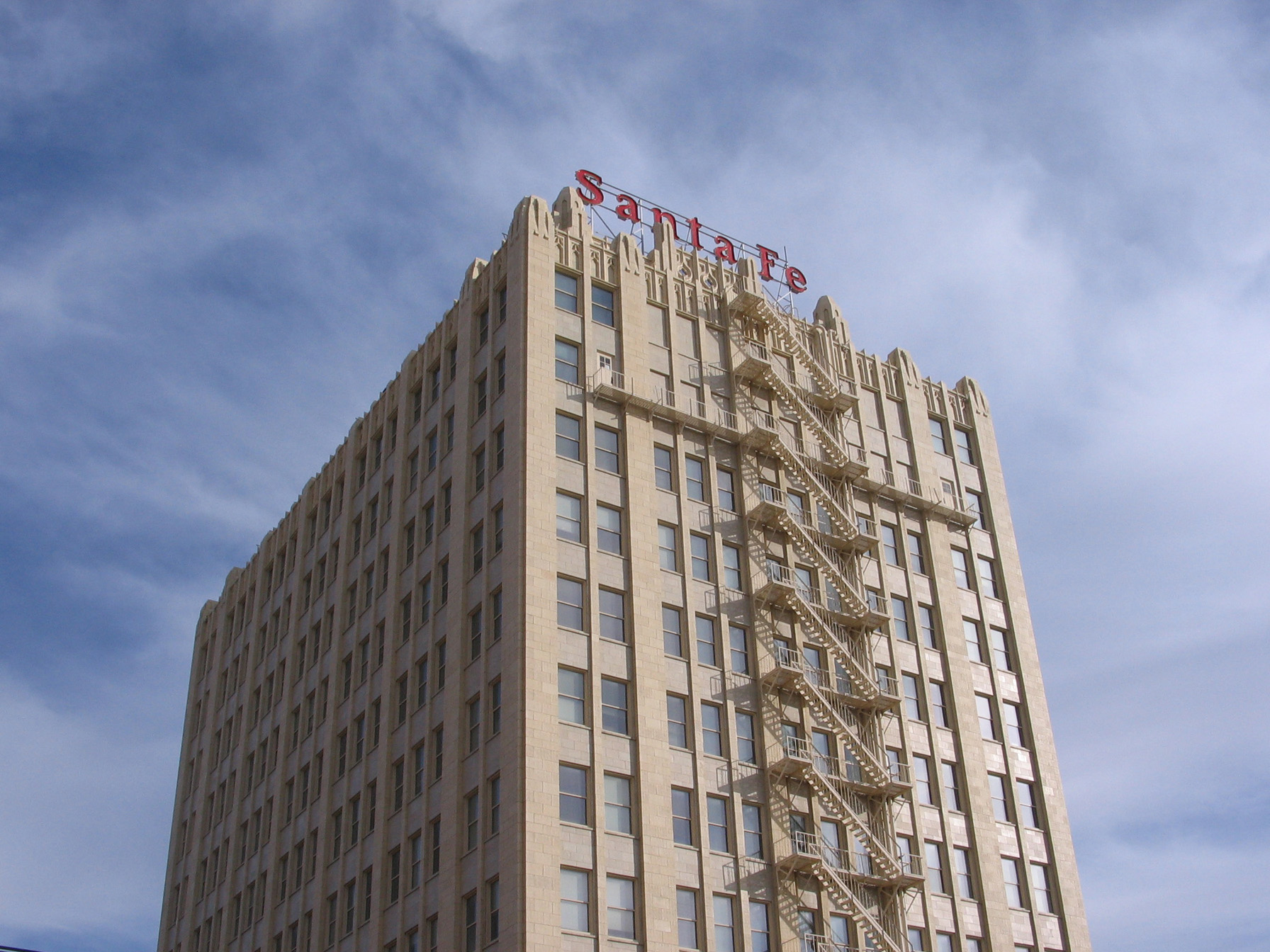
Santa Fe Building, Amarillo

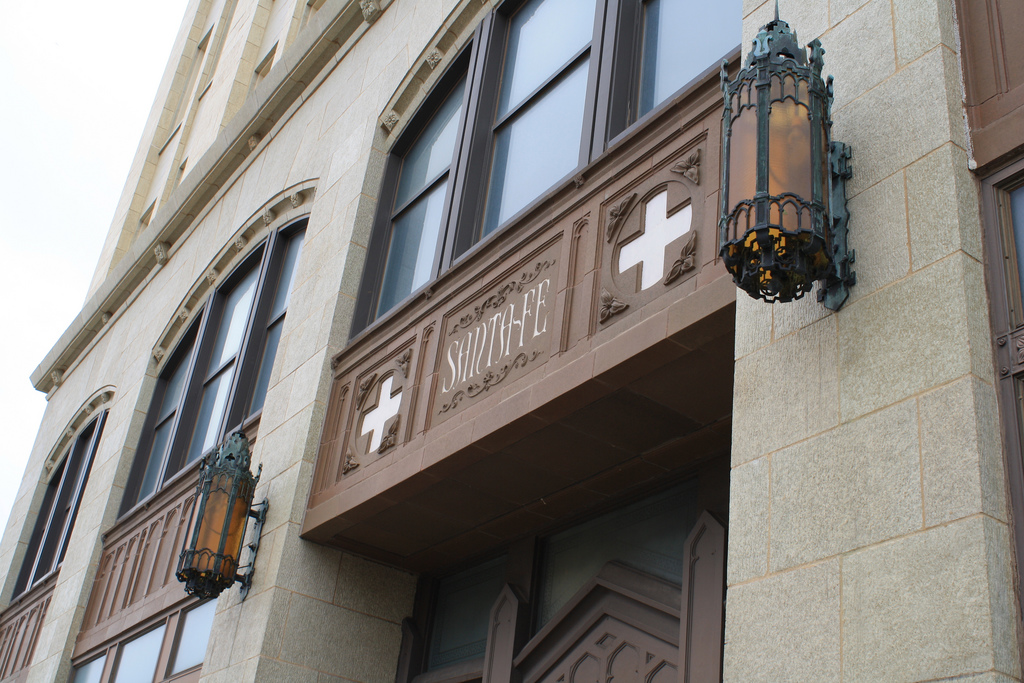
Santa Fe Building, Amarillo, detail

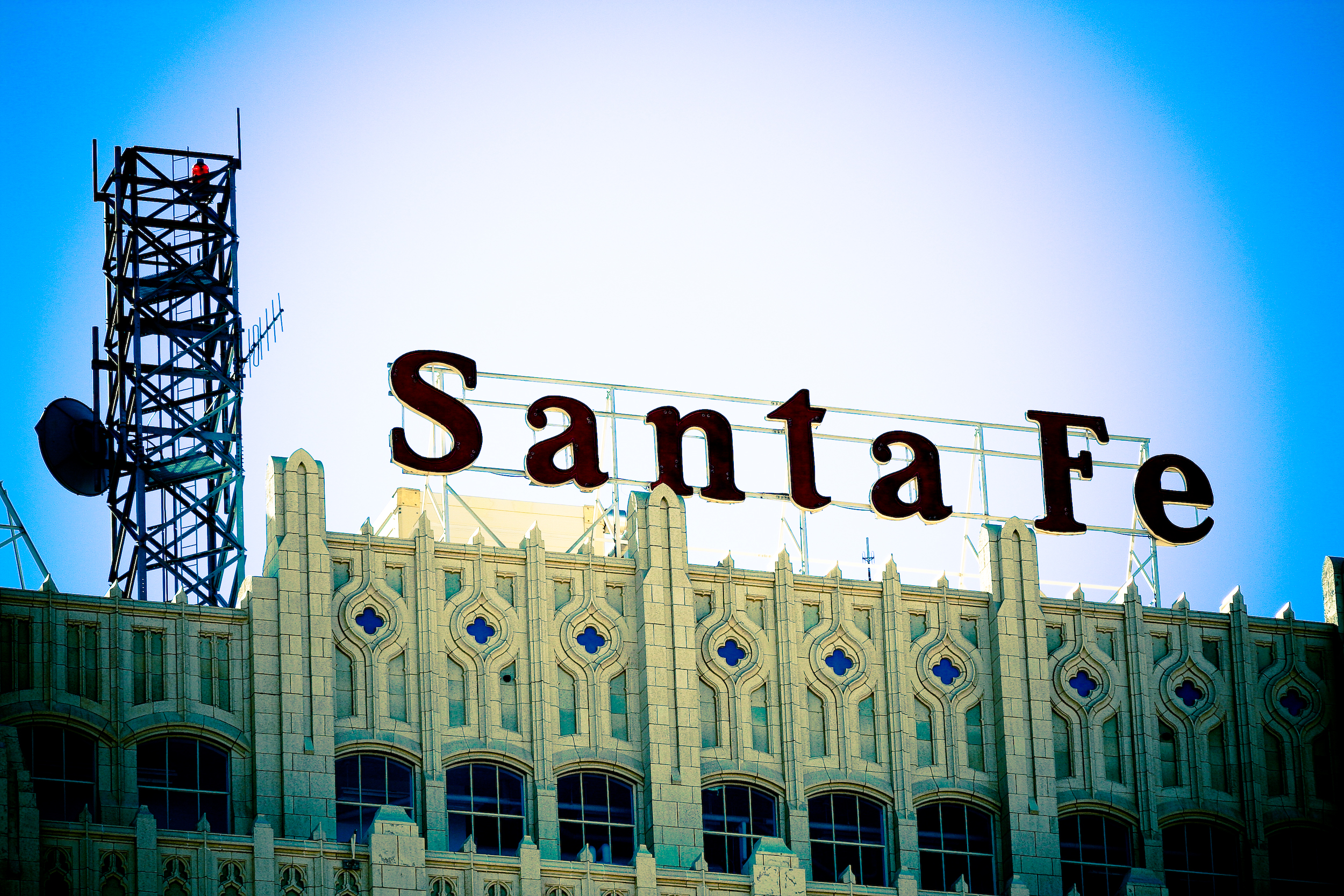
Santa Fe Building, Amarillo, detail

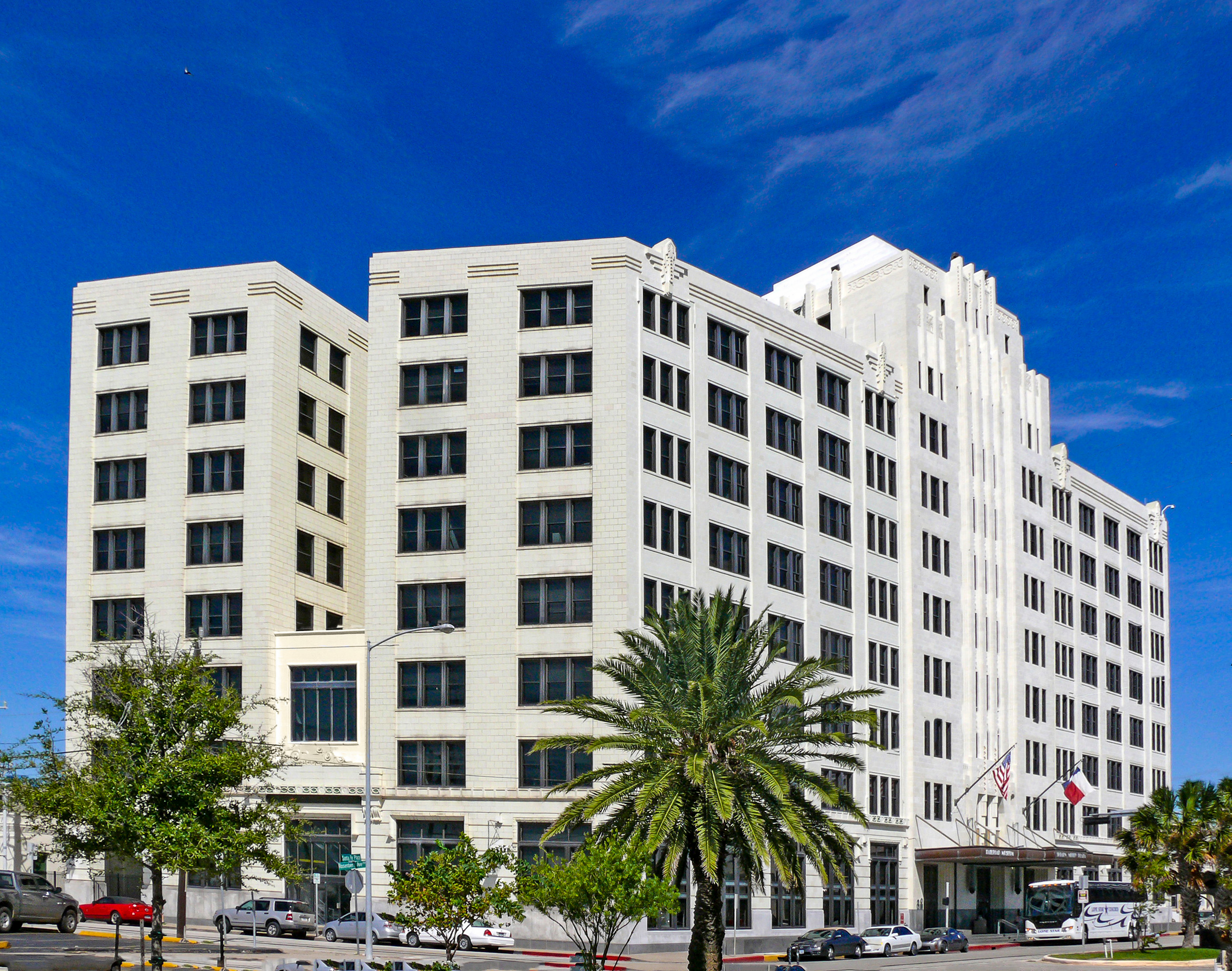
Santa Fe Building, Galveston

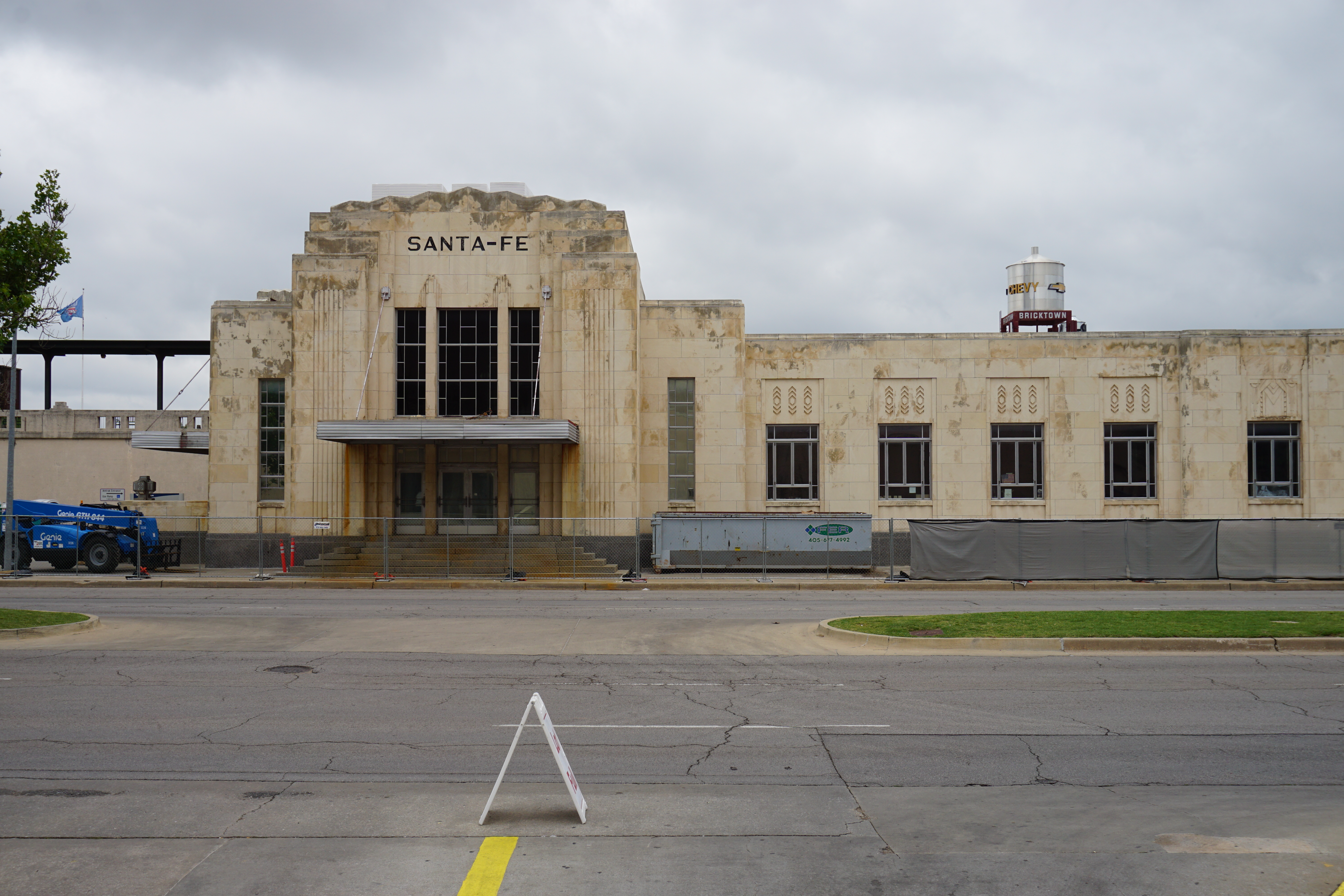
Oklahoma City Depot
