= Colorado Springs station =

Historic railway station in Colorado, US

Colorado Springs
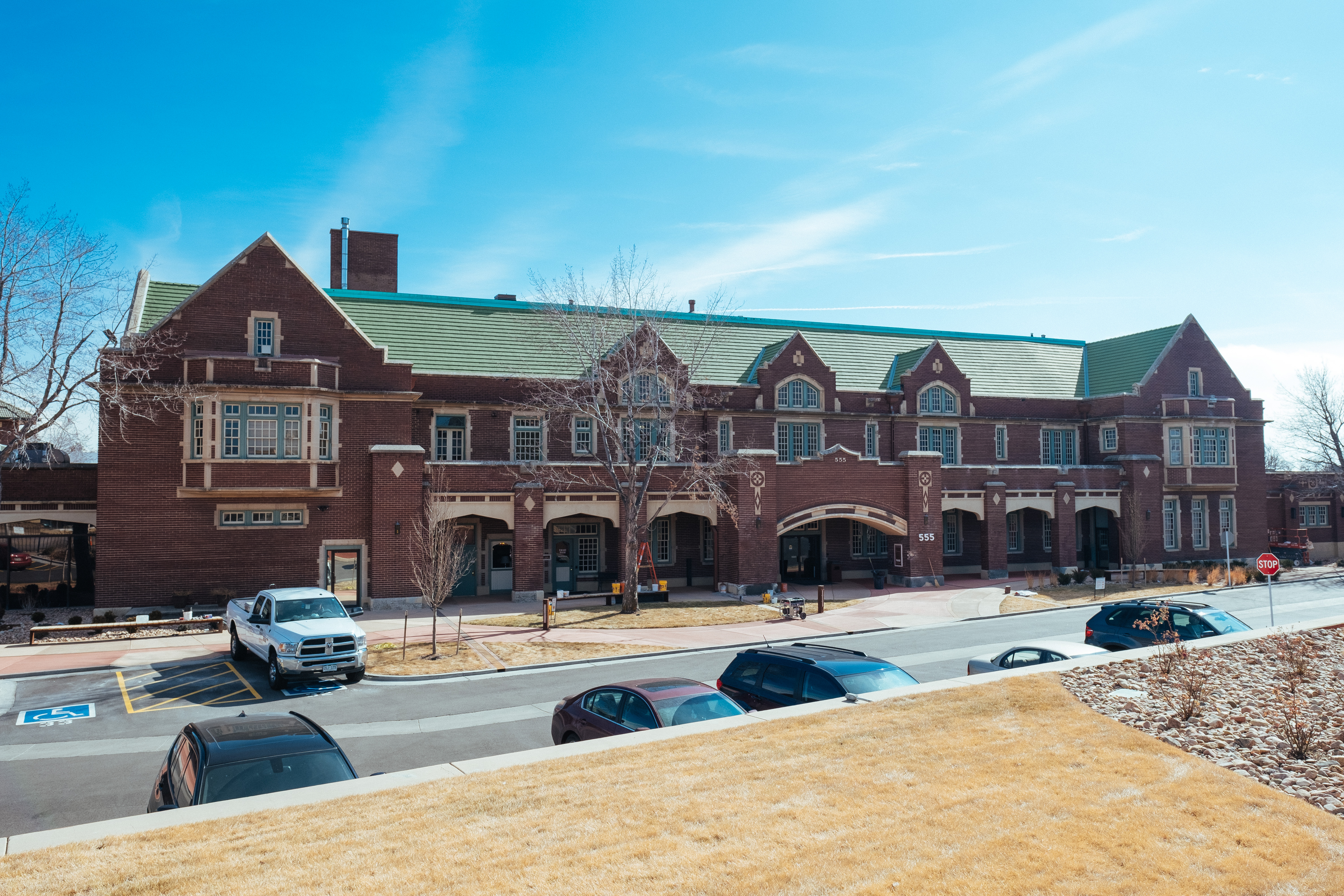
- Colorado Springs station in 2018.

General information
- Location: 555 East Pikes Peak Avenue., Colorado Springs, Colorado
- System: Former AT&SF passenger rail station
- Platforms: 1 side platform
- Tracks: 2

Construction
- Structure type: at-grade

History
- Rebuilt: 1917

Former services
| Preceding station | Atchison, Topeka and Santa Fe Railway | Following station |
|---|---|---|
| Breed toward Denver | Denver Branch | Skinners toward La Junta |
| Denver Terminus | Denver Branch Major stations | Pueblo toward La Junta |
| Preceding station | Denver and Rio Grande Western Railroad | Following station |
| Fountain toward Ogden | Royal Gorge Route | Roswell toward Denver |
- Atchison, Topeka and Santa Fe Passenger Depot
- U.S. National Register of Historic Places
- Location within Colorado Springs, Colorado Location within Colorado Location within the United States
- Location: 555 E. Pikes Peak Ave., Colorado Springs, Colorado
- Coordinates: 38°49′58″N 104°48′49″W
- Area: 7.3 acres (3.0 ha)
- Built: 1917
- Architect: E. A. Harrison
- Architectural style: Tudor Revival, Jacobethan Revival
- NRHP reference No.: 79000597
- Added to NRHP: September 10, 1979
Location

Atchison, Topeka and Santa Fe Passenger Depot or Santa Fe Station in Colorado Springs, Colorado, is a historic railway station. The grand depot and Harvey House was built in 1917 as a joint Santa Fe/Colorado and Southern Railway facility. In 1974, the Santa Fe tracks through Colorado Springs were removed and rail operations were consolidated on the former Rio Grande trackage on the west side of town. The depot and the nearby express building (later used as a freight house) now serves as Catalyst Campus for Technology and Innovation.

The depot was listed on the National Register of Historic Places in 1979. It was deemed "significant for its architectural features and for the role it played in rail transportation in Colorado."

== See also ==
- Colorado Joint Line
- National Register of Historic Places listings in El Paso County, Colorado
