= Barelas-South Fourth Street Historic District =

- U.S. National Register of Historic Places
- U.S. Historic district
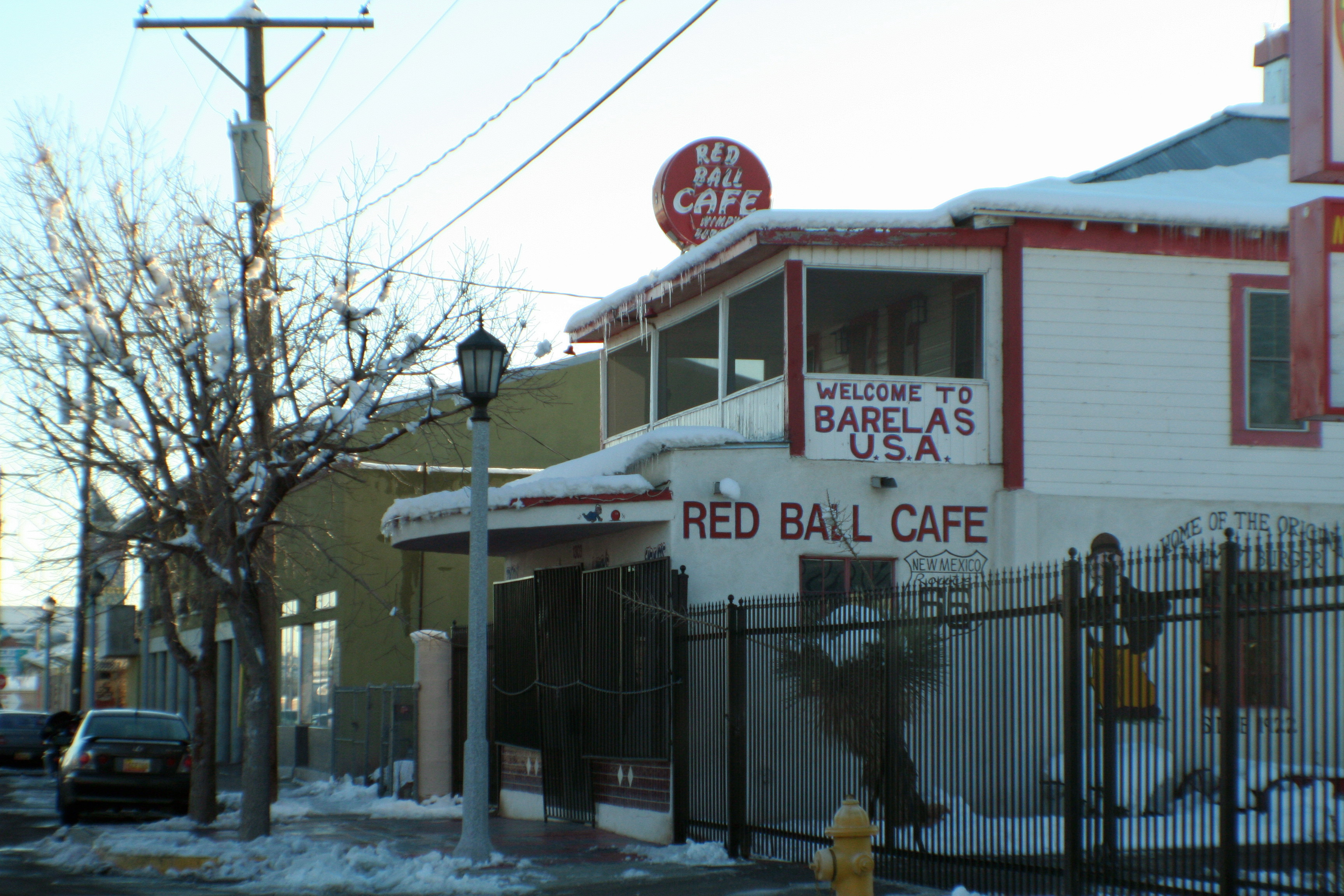
- The Red Ball Cafe, a Barelas landmark

- Location within New Mexico Location within the United States
- Location: 4th St. from Stover Ave. to Bridge Blvd., Albuquerque, New Mexico
- Coordinates: 35°04′29″N 106°39′13″W
- NRHP reference No.: 97000774
- Added to NRHP: July 24, 1997

The Barelas-South Fourth Street Historic District is a historic district in Albuquerque, New Mexico which encompasses the commercial district along 4th Street in the Barelas neighborhood. The district extends from Stover Avenue in the north to Bridge Boulevard in the south, covering a distance of about 0.6 miles (0.97 km). It contains 45 contributing buildings, mostly automobile-oriented commercial buildings constructed between 1925 and 1956, though some houses which predate the commercial development are also present. The section of 4th Street included in the district was part of U.S. Route 66 from 1926 to 1937 and was also the main commercial area in Barelas.
