= Santa Fe Railway Shops (Albuquerque) =

- U.S. National Register of Historic Places
- NM State Register of Cultural Properties
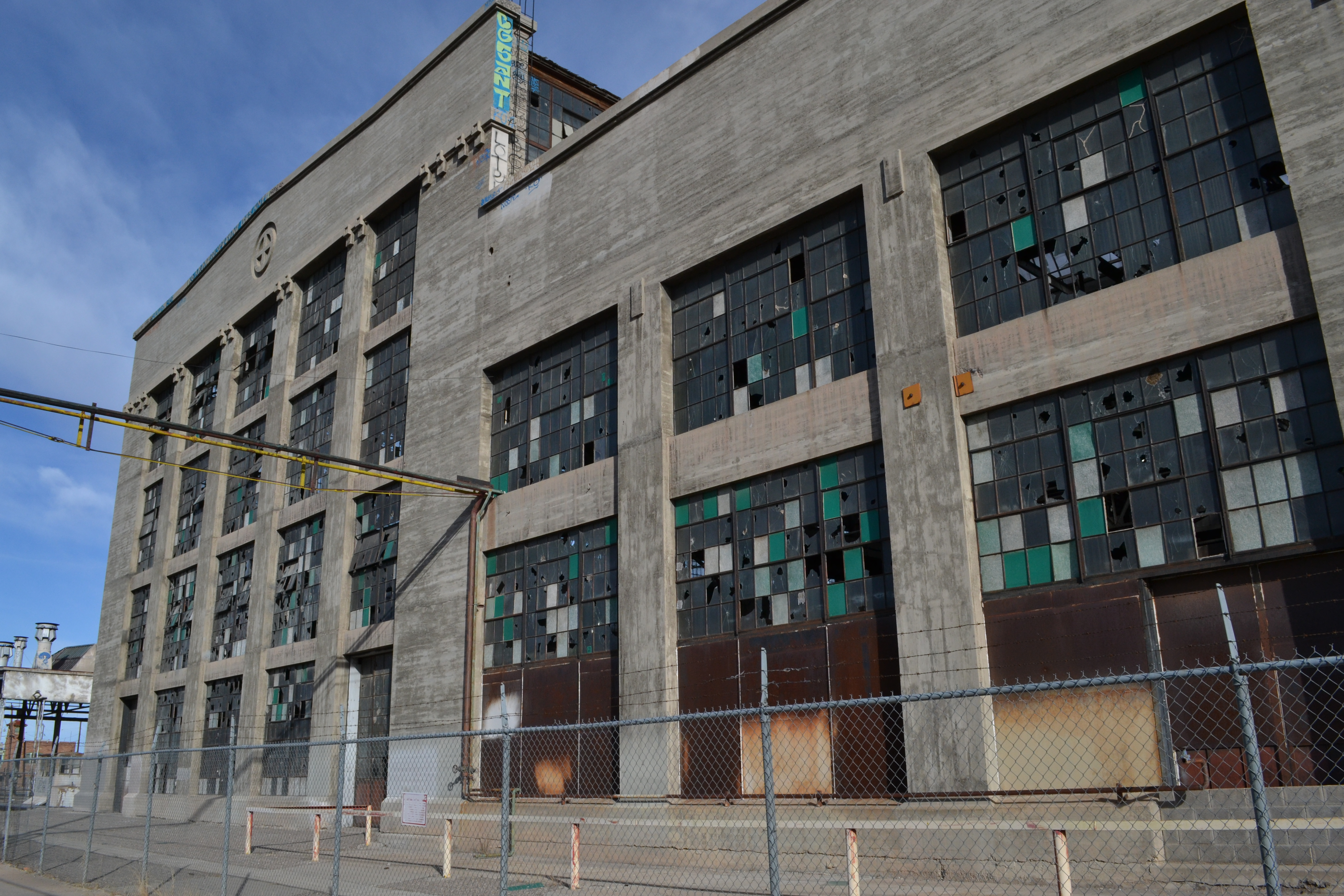
- Second Street facade of the machine shop, 2014
- Location: Albuquerque, New Mexico
- Coordinates: 35°4′30″N 106°39′0″W
- Area: 27 acres (110,000 m^{2})
- Built: 1915–25
- Architectural style: Neoclassical
- NRHP reference No.: 14000859
- NMSRCP No.: 2003

Significant dates
- Added to NRHP: October 15, 2014
- Designated NMSRCP: August 8, 2014

The former Santa Fe Railway Shops in Albuquerque, New Mexico, consist of eighteen surviving buildings erected between 1915 and 1925. The complex is located south of downtown in the Barelas neighborhood, bounded by Second Street, Hazeldine Avenue, Commercial Street, and Pacific Avenue. The shops were one of four major maintenance facilities constructed by the Atchison, Topeka and Santa Fe Railway, the others being located in Topeka, Kansas, Cleburne, Texas, and San Bernardino, California. The railway shops were the largest employer in the city during the railroad's heyday. Currently they have been empty for years but a variety of plans have been proposed for the historic complex.

== History ==
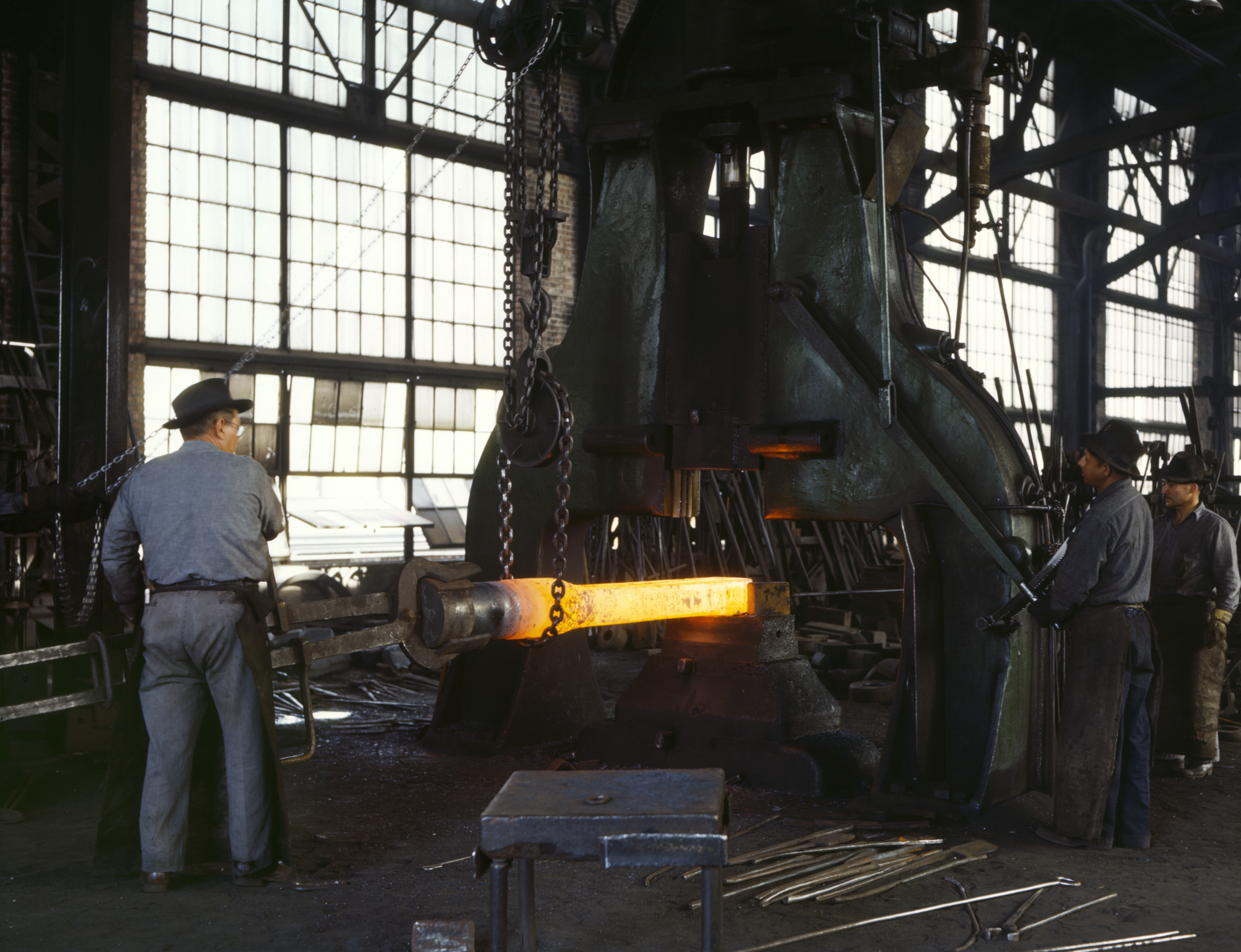
Railroad workers forging a part in the blacksmith shop, 1943

Railroad shops and a roundhouse were first erected on the site in the 1880s, after Albuquerque was designated as the division point between the AT&SF railway and the Atlantic and Pacific Railroad. After buying out the A&P in 1902, the Santa Fe Railway began expanding and modernizing the old A&P shops in 1912. The first buildings to be completed were the roundhouse, storehouse, power station, and freight car shops, all of which were located south of the surviving complex near the present Bridge Boulevard overpass. These structures have since been demolished, but the subsequent buildings completed after 1915 are all still standing.

The current railyard buildings were constructed between 1915 and 1925. The shops became Albuquerque's largest employer, with 970 employees (then about a quarter of the city's workforce) in 1919, and a peak of 1,500 in the 1940s. The core operation was maintenance of steam locomotives, which required a complete rebuild every 12 to 18 months. At their peak, the Albuquerque shops completed around 40 such overhauls per month. However, activity at the railyard declined in the 1950s as the Santa Fe transitioned from steam to diesel locomotives. The railroad decided to locate its diesel repair facilities at the Cleburne and San Bernardino yards, scaling back operations in Albuquerque to around 200 employees. The shops continued to operate as maintenance-of-way equipment repair shops into the 1980s.

== Buildings ==
=== Erection/Machine shop ===
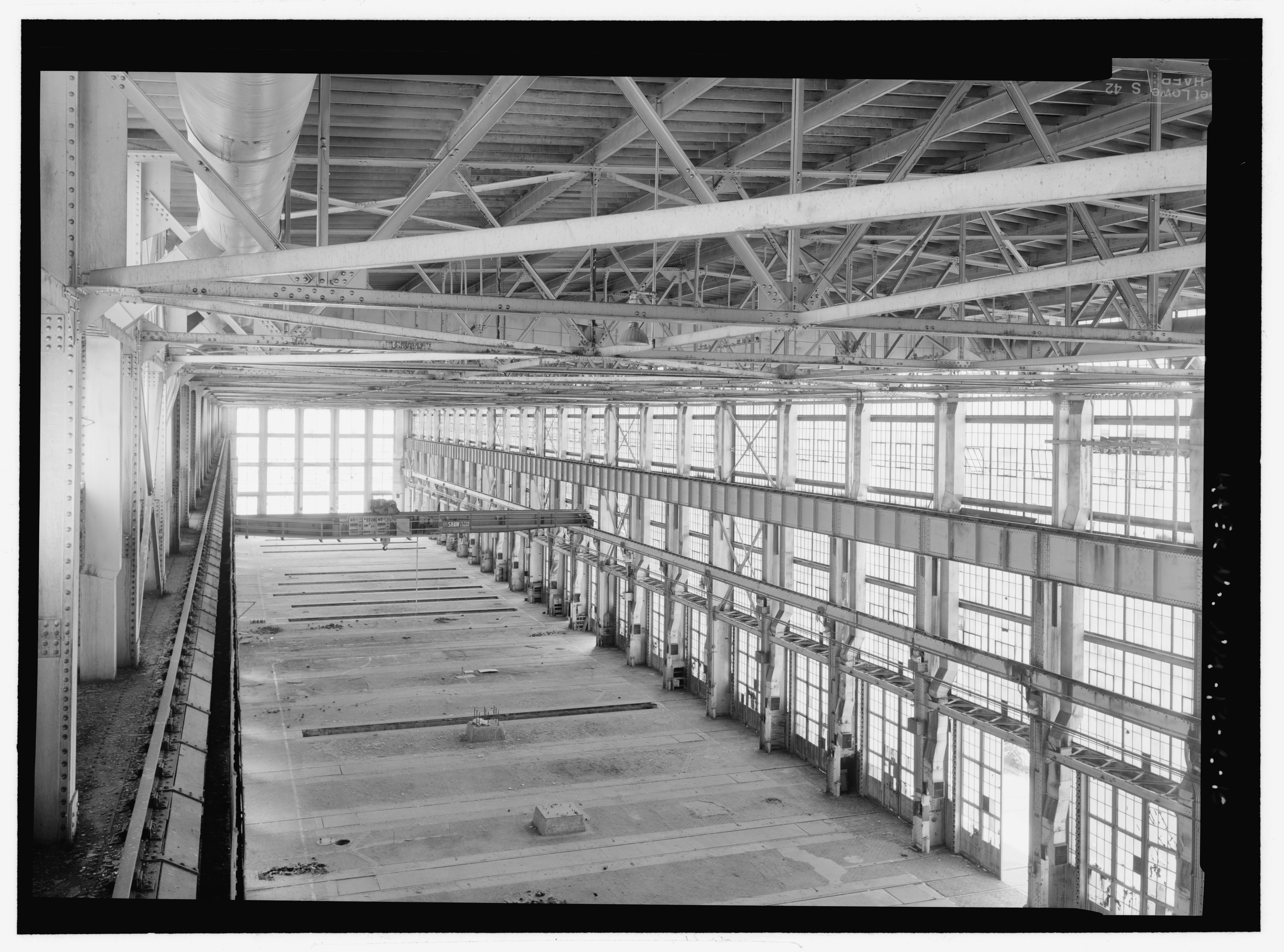
Interior of the main bay in the erection shop

By far the largest building at the railyard is the erection and machine shop, which spans the full width of the site from Second to Commercial and contains about 165,000 square feet (15,300 m^{2}) of floor space. The building was designed in 1920 and built in eight months starting in February 1921. The erection shop and machine shop are within one building, separated by a wall on the south side of the erection shop. At the time it was considered to be at the forefront of industrial design, comparable to the Glass Plant at the Ford River Rouge Complex in Michigan. The building has a steel structure, with uninterrupted glass curtain walls on the north and south faces and more substantial reinforced concrete facades on the east and west sides. The expansive main bay (erection shop) is 57 feet (17 m) high and 604 feet (184 m) long with several overhead cranes, the largest of which has a 250-ton capacity. The building is floored with wooden blocks to cut down on noise.

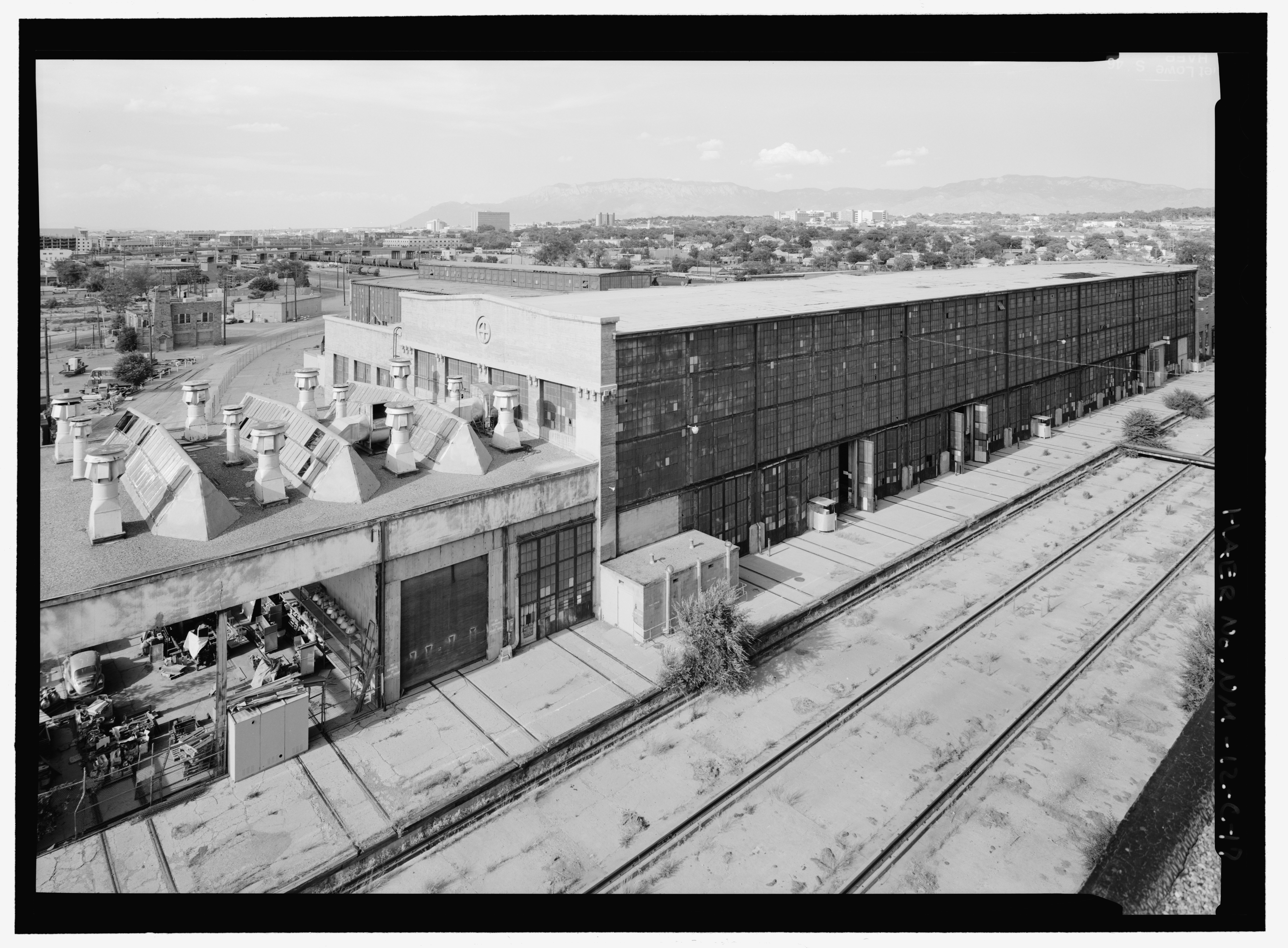
The boiler shop and transfer table

=== Boiler shop ===
The smaller boiler shop, which was completed in 1923, stands to the north of the erection shop and is similar to it in design and appearance. It has a floor area of 58,100 square feet (5,400 m^{2}). Like the erection shop, the boiler shop employs a cross-axial design with track rail perpendicular to the main axis of the building.

=== Blacksmith shop ===
The blacksmith shop was completed in 1917 and stands to the east of the boiler shop. It is the third largest building on the site at approximately 25,000 square feet (2,300 m^{2}). The building is of steel frame construction with brick and glass exterior walls. The blacksmith shop was responsible for repairing cracked locomotive frames as well as forging replacement parts.

=== Fire station ===
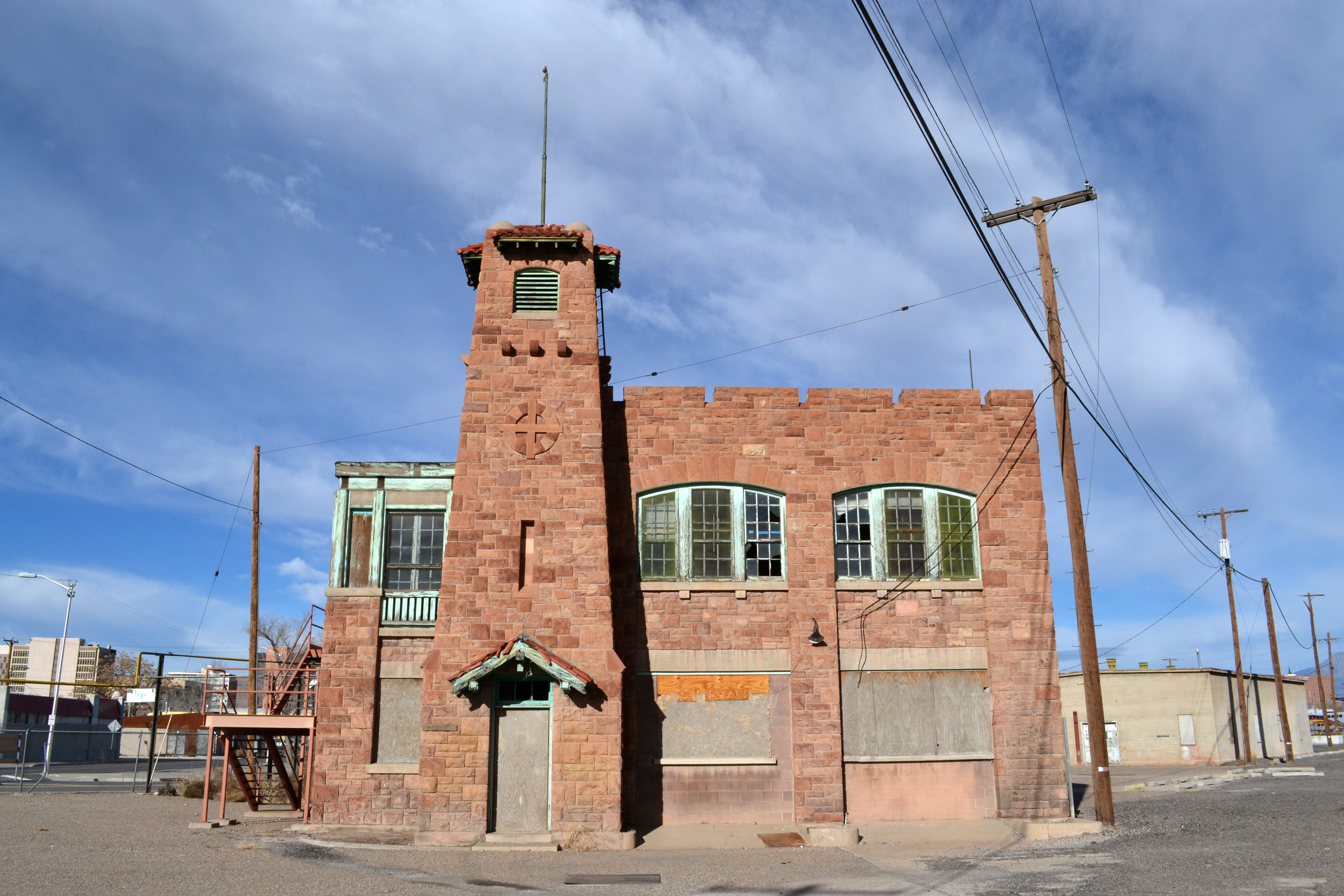
The fire station in 2014

Another significant structure is the fire station, a rustic, Mediterranean-style building with sandstone walls, crenelated parapets, and an asymmetrical corner tower. It was designed by E.A. Harrison and stands on the northwest corner of the railyard complex, near the intersection of First and Second streets. Built in 1920, it is the oldest surviving fire station in Albuquerque. The building has been designated an Albuquerque historic landmark and is thus protected from alteration without city approval.

=== Other buildings ===
The complex includes around a dozen other buildings including the flue shop (1920), tank shop (1925), and storehouse (1915).

== Current status ==
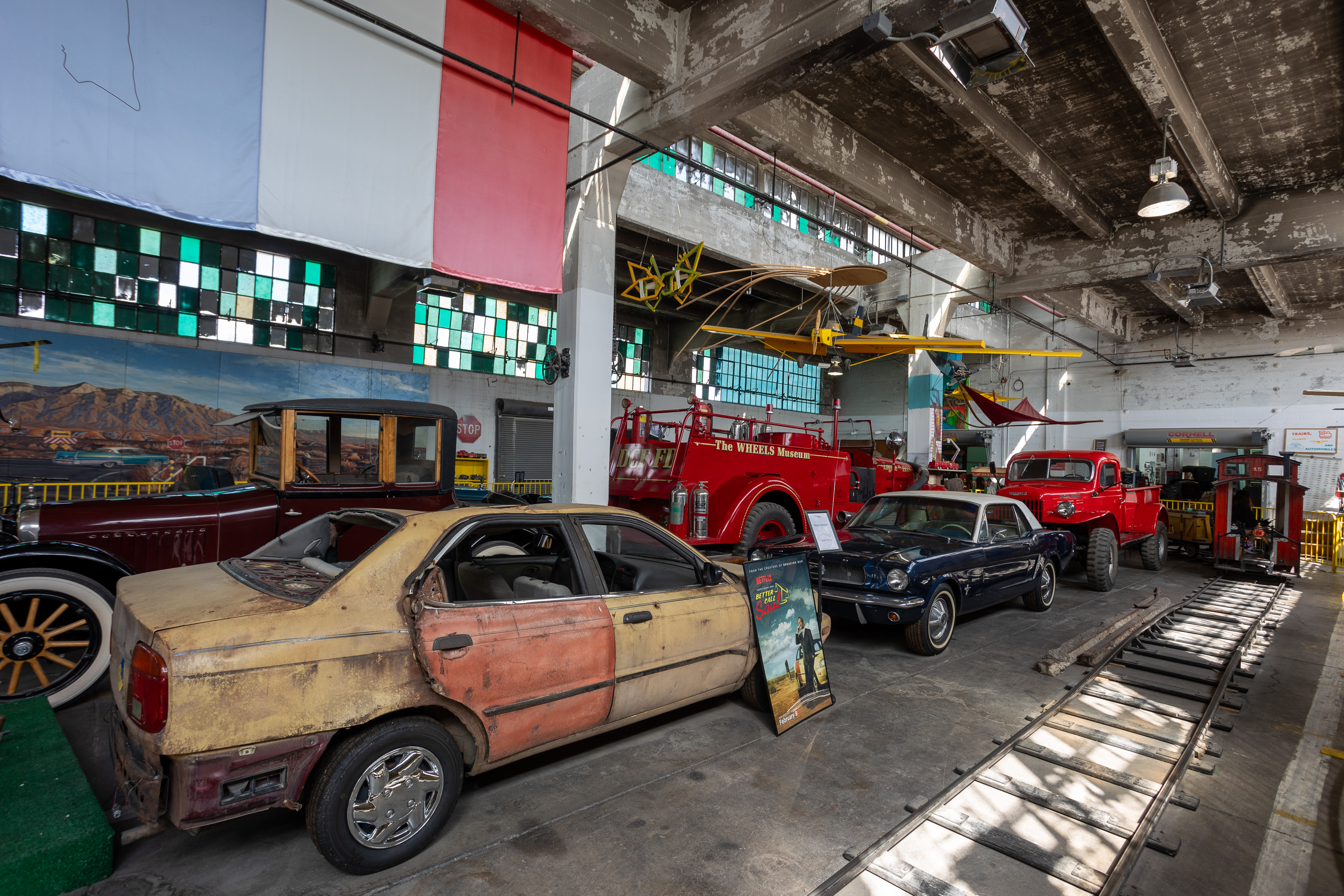
The Wheels Museum in 2024

Various ideas have been discussed for reusing the Santa Fe shops, including a transportation museum called the Wheels Museum, mixed-income housing, a multi-use retail and exposition center, and a state-of-the-art digital film studio. The complex was purchased by the city of Albuquerque in 2007 for $8.5 million. In 2011, a California-based developer was selected to lead the redevelopment of the site, but the contract was canceled in 2018 after little progress during the intervening years. Mayor Tim Keller tore up the contract at a press conference and announced that subsequent redevelopment efforts would be led by the city. The complex was added to the New Mexico State Register of Cultural Properties and the National Register of Historic Places in 2014.

In 2013, the city spent $900,000 to repair and stabilize the Blacksmith Shop building, hoping to rent it out for special events. Since 2014, the building has hosted the Rail Yards Market, a weekly farmers' market which operates from May through October. As of 2018, the city plans to repair a second building to add more space for the market and other special events.

Since the 2000s, the unused railyard has become a popular filming location. Movies with scenes filmed there include Beerfest (2006), The Spirit (2008), Gamer (2009), Terminator Salvation (2009), and The Avengers (2012). The pilot episode of Terminator: The Sarah Connor Chronicles also used the railyard as a location. Several Episodes of Sci-Fi's Lost Room were filmed there, as was the yet to be released 0000 movie. Several scenes in the AMC television series Breaking Bad and Better Call Saul were shot at the shops. The cover of the DVD for the Fifth Season of Breaking Bad is a photo of Walter White inside the shops.
