= Newlander Apartments =

- U.S. National Register of Historic Places
- NM State Register of Cultural Properties
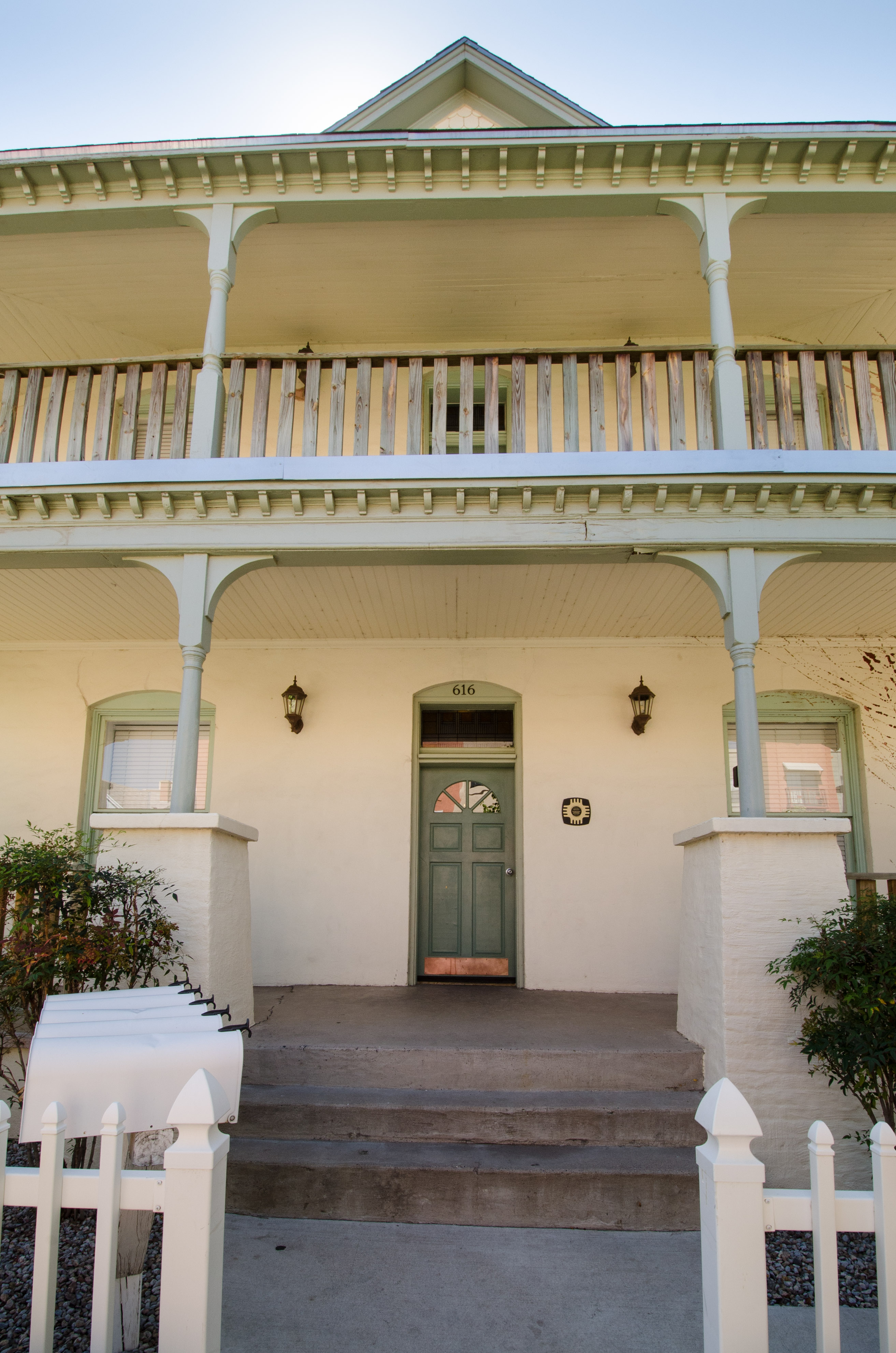
- Newlander Apartments, September 2012

- Location within New Mexico Location within the United States
- Location: 616 Coal Ave. SW., Albuquerque, New Mexico
- Coordinates: 35°04′58″N 106°39′20″W
- Built: 1901
- NRHP reference No.: 99001677
- NMSRCP No.: 1785

Significant dates
- Added to NRHP: January 27, 2000
- Designated NMSRCP: November 19, 1999

The Newlander Apartments are a historic apartment building in Albuquerque, New Mexico. Originally built as a single-family house in 1901 and expanded via a number of additions, it is notable as a well-preserved example of the small boarding houses and apartment buildings that housed much of Albuquerque's working-class population in the early 20th century. The building is listed in the New Mexico State Register of Cultural Properties and the National Register of Historic Places.

== History ==
The building was constructed in 1901 by John Newlander, a carpenter and manager of the Albuquerque Planing Mill Company. The Albuquerque Citizen described it as a "fifteen room residence, two story brick with modern convenience". Newlander built the house himself at a cost of $6,000. It was located in the Atlantic and Pacific Addition, which at the time was the western fringe of the city. By 1916, Newlander's wife Lula had converted the house to a four-unit apartment building. The apartments were typical of the small boarding houses and apartment buildings, mainly converted single-unit dwellings, that served Albuquerque's working-class inhabitants in the early 20th century.

Multiple additions at the rear of the building gradually increased the number of apartments to 14 by 1946. Between 1932 and 1941, the apartments operated under the name Fifield Apartments. The building continued to function as apartments into the 1990s, although its condition deteriorated. Eventually it was purchased by the city for redevelopment and has since been restored. The property was added to the New Mexico State Register of Cultural Properties in 1999 and the National Register of Historic Places in 2000.

== Architecture ==
The Newlander Apartments are two and a half stories in height with a hip roof, exemplifying the "hipped box" style. The front of the building has a full-width, two-story porch with turned wood supports and balustrades and bracketed cornices. The asphalt-shingled roof is punctuated by four dormers, one on each side. The rear dormer has a shed roof and the other three are gable roofed. The interior has a central hall plan with high ceilings and many original details.
